= National Register of Historic Places listings in Fremont County, Colorado =

Location of Fremont County in Colorado

This is a list of the National Register of Historic Places listings in Fremont County, Colorado.

This is intended to be a complete list of the properties and districts on the National Register of Historic Places in Fremont County, Colorado, United States. The locations of National Register properties and districts for which the latitude and longitude coordinates are included below, may be seen in a map.

There are 23 properties and districts listed on the National Register in the county. Another 4 properties were once listed but have been removed.

This National Park Service list is complete through NPS recent listings posted September 25, 2026.

== Current listings ==
	Name on the Register	Image	Date listed	Location	City or town	Description
1	Samuel H. Atwater House	Samuel H. Atwater House	March 7, 1996 (#96000241)	821 Macon Ave. 38°26′38″N 105°14′13″W	Cañon City	Queen Anne house built in 1908
2	Bridge No. 10/Adelaide Bridge	Bridge No. 10/Adelaide Bridge	February 4, 1985 (#85000208)	Fremont County Road; 38°34′17″N 105°05′10″W	Florence	
3	Cañon City Downtown Historic District	Cañon City Downtown Historic District	October 20, 1983 (#83003517)	Roughly Main St. from 3rd to 9th Sts. and Macon Ave.; also 602 Macon Ave. 38°26′29″N 105°14′17″W	Cañon City	602 Macon Ave. represents a boundary increase of February 6, 1986
4	Cañon City Municipal Building	Cañon City Municipal Building	August 18, 1983 (#83001318)	612 Royal Gorge Boulevard; 38°26′57″N 105°14′16″W	Cañon City	
5	Cañon City State Armory	Cañon City State Armory	August 20, 1999 (#99001011)	110 Main St. 38°26′17″N 105°14′42″W	Cañon City	
6	Christ Episcopal Church	Christ Episcopal Church	August 19, 1994 (#94001011)	802 Harrison Ave. 38°26′41″N 105°14′16″W	Cañon City	
7	Colorado Women's Prison	Colorado Women's Prison	March 5, 1999 (#99000265)	201 N. 1st St. 38°26′21″N 105°14′48″W	Cañon City	
8	Deputy Warden's House	Deputy Warden's House	May 2, 2001 (#01000443)	105 Main; 38°26′18″N 105°14′45″W	Cañon City	
9	Downtown Florence Historic District	Downtown Florence Historic District	July 14, 2017 (#100001309)	Roughly bounded by Main St., Santa Fe & Petroleum Aves. between W. 2nd & Railroad Sts. 38°23′24″N 105°07′04″W	Florence	
10	First Presbyterian Church	First Presbyterian Church	September 1, 1983 (#83001319)	Macon and 7th Sts. 38°26′35″N 105°14′18″W	Cañon City	
11	Florence High School	Florence High School	September 1, 2022 (#100008040)	215 Maple Ave. 38°23′32″N 105°07′14″W	Florence	
12	Greenwood Cemetery	Greenwood Cemetery	September 4, 2013 (#13000661)	1251 S. 1st St. 38°25′40″N 105°14′49″W	Cañon City	
13	Holy Cross Abbey	Holy Cross Abbey	August 18, 1983 (#83001320)	U.S. Highway 50; 38°26′56″N 105°12′01″W	Cañon City	
14	Main Street Bridge	Main Street Bridge	October 15, 2002 (#02001145)	State Highway 115 at milepost 8.90; 38°23′21″N 105°06′48″W	Florence	
15	McClure House	McClure House	September 14, 1979 (#79000609)	323-331 Main St. 38°26′24″N 105°14′30″W	Cañon City	
16	Mount Saint Scholastica Academy, East Building	Mount Saint Scholastica Academy, East Building	January 15, 1998 (#97001646)	615 Pike Ave. 38°26′50″N 105°14′30″W	Cañon City	
17	Oil Spring	Oil Spring	February 16, 1996 (#96000043)	Address Restricted	Cañon City	
18	Robison Mansion	Robison Mansion	October 11, 1984 (#84000022)	12 Riverside Dr. 38°26′02″N 105°14′39″W	Cañon City	
19	Rouch Gulch Bridge	Rouch Gulch Bridge	November 27, 2002 (#02001410)	U.S. Highway 50 at milepost 230.12; 38°28′20″N 105°52′38″W	Swissvale	
20	Royal Gorge Bridge and Incline Railway	Royal Gorge Bridge and Incline Railway	September 2, 1983 (#83001303)	Northwest of Cañon City; 38°27′53″N 105°19′32″W	Cañon City	
21	South Canon High School	South Canon High School	October 24, 2005 (#00001648)	1020 Park Ave. 38°26′07″N 105°13′43″W	Cañon City	Now used as apartments.
22	U.S. Post Office and Federal Building–Cañon City Main	U.S. Post Office and Federal Building–Cañon City Main	January 22, 1986 (#86000167)	5th St. and Macon Ave. 38°26′29″N 105°14′27″W	Cañon City	
23	US Post Office–Florence Main	US Post Office–Florence Main	January 22, 1986 (#86000174)	121 N. Pikes Peak St. 38°23′27″N 105°07′03″W	Florence	

== Former listings ==
	Name on the Register	Image	Date listed	Date removed	Location	City or town	Description
1	Fourth Street Bridge	Fourth Street Bridge	February 4, 1985 (#85000207)	January 14, 2010	4th St. 38°26′22″N 105°13′52″W	Cañon City	Now a pedestrian bridge adjacent to 4th Street. Removed from the Register due to relocation..
2	Howard Bridge		February 4, 1985 (#85000209)	September 16, 2002	Off U.S. Highway 50	Howard	Replaced in 1996
3	Portland Bridge	Portland Bridge	February 4, 1985 (#85000210)	November 13, 2017	State Highway 120; 38°23′19″N 105°00′56″W	Portland	Replaced in 2014.
4	Rio Grande Railroad Viaduct	Rio Grande Railroad Viaduct	October 15, 2002 (#02001148)	November 13, 2017	State Highway 120 at milepost 0.17; 38°23′10″N 105°04′18″W	Florence	

== See also ==
- List of National Historic Landmarks in Colorado
- List of National Register of Historic Places in Colorado
- Bibliography of Colorado
- Geography of Colorado
- History of Colorado
- Index of Colorado-related articles
- List of Colorado-related lists
- Outline of Colorado
