= Cotopaxi, Colorado =

Unincorporated community in Colorado, US

- Census-designated place
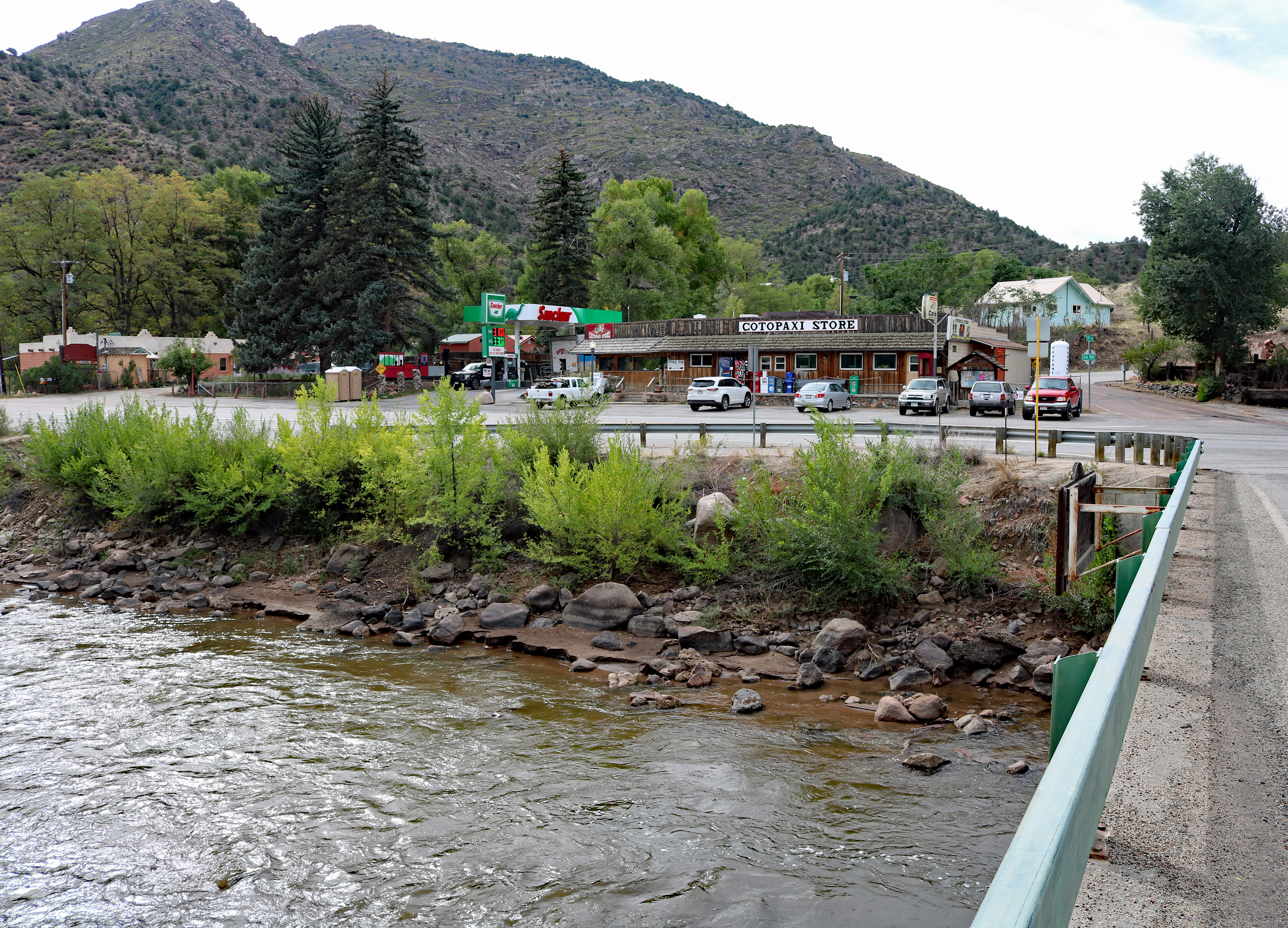
- Cotopaxi on U.S. Route 50.

- Location of the Cotopaxi CDP in Fremont County, Colorado.
- Coordinates: 38°22′38″N 105°41′20″W
- Country: United States
- State: Colorado
- County: Fremont
- Founded: 1882

Government
  - Type: Unincorporated community
  - Body: Fremont County

Area
  - Total: 0.286 sq mi (0.740 km^{2})
  - Land: 0.286 sq mi (0.740 km^{2})
  - Water: 0 sq mi (0.000 km^{2})
- Elevation: 6,362 ft (1,939 m)

Population (2020)
  - Total: 44
  - Density: 150/sq mi (59/km^{2})
- Time zone: UTC−07:00 (MST)
  - Summer (DST): UTC−06:00 (MDT)
- ZIP code: 81223
- Area codes: 719
- GNIS CDP ID: 2583227
- FIPS code: 08-17485

Cotopaxi is an unincorporated town, a post office, and a census-designated place (CDP) located in and governed by Fremont County, Colorado, United States. The CDP is a part of the Cañon City, CO Micropolitan Statistical Area. The Cotopaxi post office has the ZIP Code 81223. At the United States Census 2020, the population of the Cotopaxi CDP was 44.

== History ==
The Cotopaxi, Colorado, post office opened on May 25, 1880. The town was named after Cotopaxi Volcano, one of the highest active volcanoes in the world, located in Ecuador. Henry Thomas was the man responsible for naming Cotopaxi. He was an early prospector to the western territory in the mid-nineteenth century. Cotopaxi is also known for its early failed colony of approximately 63 Russian-Jewish immigrants who first settled there in early 1882. These colonists, most of whom were related, traveled to Colorado in hopes of starting a successful farming community and to reap the benefits of the new Homestead Act, which would grant each head male of a family 160 acres (65 ha) of land. When the colonists arrived in Cotopaxi, they discovered that only half of the houses that were promised to be built upon their arrival had actually been erected; this forced many of the families to live out of small makeshift canvas houses during the first winter. In addition to the housing problems, the colonists faced an extreme shortage of supplies that were needed to support them through the first winter and to plant their crops. Desperate to plant their crops, the colonists soon opened large lines of credit with the local store to buy the seeds and equipment they needed to get their crops planted. The variety of crops that the colonists chose to plant mostly consisted of potatoes and corn. The immigrants soon discovered, however, that the climate in the Colorado mountains was only suitable for growing crops for less than four months out of the year, and the first frost of winter killed most of what was still planted in the fields. This failed season of crops forced the immigrants to look for jobs elsewhere to help pay off their fast-growing debt to the local store. They soon found work with the Denver and Rio Grande Railroad which had decided to lay down more tracks to the west over Marshall Pass. The men of the colony were paid three dollars a day, which helped the struggling settlement get through its first winter. The colonists made it to spring, but the second crop was also a failure, and entire families soon started leaving. Only about six families remained in Cotopaxi to plant a third crop, which was wiped out by a large blizzard, and this officially ended the attempted farming colony in early June 1884.

Cotopaxi was a small train stop on the Denver and Rio Grande Western Railroad along the Arkansas River. Though there is a store serving the main highway through the town (U.S. 50), there are no major businesses in Cotopaxi (owing to the small population) except for a whitewater rafting business that attracts thousands of tourists each year to ride on the Arkansas River.

== Geography ==
Cotopaxi is lies on both sides of the Arkansas River, 33 miles (53 km) west of Cañon City, the county seat, and 25 miles (40 km) southeast of Salida.

The Cotopaxi CDP has an area of 183 acres (0.740 km^{2}), all land.

== Demographics ==
The United States Census Bureau initially defined the Cotopaxi CDP for the United States Census 2010.

Cotopaxi CDP, Colorado
Year	Pop.	±%
2010	47	—
2020	44	−6.4%
Source: United States Census Bureau

== Economy ==
Today, Cotopaxi has a few small businesses, the most notable of which is the Cotopaxi General Store. This general store was opened in the early 1920s and has since been connected to a Sinclair gas station.

== Education ==
Cotopaxi is home to Cotopaxi School District Fremont RE-3. The school district directs the educational needs of western Fremont County including Cotopaxi and the surrounding communities of Coaldale, Howard, Swissvale, Wellsville and the Copper Gulch area. Cotopaxi has two schools, Cotopaxi K-8 School and Cotopaxi High School located north of U.S. Highway 50.

== Highways ==
- U.S. Highway 50

== See also ==
- Front Range Urban Corridor
