= Stephanie Luck =

American politician

Member of the Colorado House of Representatives from the 60th district
- Incumbent
- Assumed office January 9, 2023
- Preceded by: Redistricted
- Succeeded by: Matt Alexander (elect)

Member of the Colorado House of Representatives from the 47th district
- In office January 13, 2021 – January 9, 2023
- Preceded by: Bri Buentello
- Succeeded by: Redistricted

Personal details
- Party: Republican
- Occupation: Teacher, attorney, community organizer
- Website: Campaign website

Stephanie Luck is an American politician and a member of the Colorado House of Representatives from Penrose, Colorado. A Republican, Luck represents House District 60, which includes Chaffee, Custer, Fremont, and Teller counties and part of Pueblo County and includes the communities of Cañon City, Pueblo West, Woodland Park, Lincoln Park, and Florence. Prior to 2020 reapportionment taking effect in 2023, Luck represented the former District 47, which included portions of Pueblo and Fremont counties and all of Otero County in southern Colorado.

== Background ==
Prior to her election to the Colorado State House in 2020, Luck ran unsuccessfully for the Colorado State Senate in 2018. A Colorado native, Luck earned her law license in New York State. Most recently, she has been working as a sixth-grade teacher. Previously she served as the president of the Penrose Chamber of Commerce and has also served on other boards and as a volunteer in various community initiatives.

== Political career ==
In March 2021, Luck sent her policy director to attend a panel that promoted the view that the 2020 presidential election was fraudulent. Along with a Republican legislator, the two cast doubt on the validity of the election results and told attendees to voice support for Republican bills aiming to restrict ballot access.

During the 2021 legislative session, Luck was the lead sponsor of a measure that would have required abortion providers to collect sensitive and personal data from patients for compilation in a public report. The measure was blocked in the House.

== Elections ==
Luck was first elected to the Colorado House of Representatives in the 2020 general election. In the June 2020 primary election, she defeated Republican party challenger Ron Parker, winning 51.90% of the total votes cast.

In the 2020 general election, Luck defeated her only opponent, Democratic incumbent Bri Buentello, winning 54.09% of the total votes cast.

In the 2020 reapportionment process, Luck's residence in Penrose moved from house District 47 to house District 60. The newly reapportioned District 60 is geographically very different than the former District 47 and includes Chaffee, Custer, Fremont, and Teller counties and part of Pueblo County and includes the communities of Cañon City, Pueblo West, Woodland Park, Lincoln Park, and Florence.

In the 2022 Colorado House of Representatives election, Luck defeated her Democratic Party opponent, winning 68.78% of the total votes cast.

Luck ran for re-election in 2024. In the Republican primary election held June 25, 2024, she ran unopposed. In the general election held November 5, 2024, Luck defeated her Democratic Party opponent, winning 69.77% of the total votes cast.
