= Calcite, Colorado =

Ghost town in Fremont County, Colorado, United States

- Ghost town
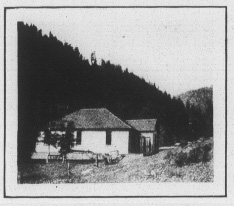
- Men's club constructed in 1914 by Colorado Fuel & Iron

- Location of Calcite, Colorado. Calcite (Colorado)
- Coordinates: 38°26′10″N 105°53′14″W
- Country: United States
- State: Colorado
- County: Fremont

Government
  - Type: Unincorporated community
  - Body: Fremont County
- Elevation: 7,602 ft (2,317 m)
- Time zone: UTC−07:00 (MST)
  - Summer (DST): UTC−06:00 (MDT)
- ZIP code: 81233
- GNIS pop ID: (no longer listed)

Calcite is an extinct town located in Fremont County, Colorado, United States. It served as a company coal mining town for Colorado Fuel & Iron. It is located along Howard Creek roughly six miles from the census-designated place of Howard.

== Description ==
Calcite's name come from the carbonate mineral calcite, which was quarried in significant quantities in the valleys near the settlement. Located near the base of Hunts Peak, a 13,071-foot-tall (3,984 m) mountain in the Sangre de Cristo Range, it was composed of a set of three Upper, Middle, and Lower camps. The Calcite, Colorado, post office operated from June 29, 1904, until April 30, 1930. At its height, 200 people lived in Calcite, though there is no cemetery.

The site is currently composed of several abandoned structures and has signs delineating the separate camps. Basements of homes, portions of mining buildings, and pathways from the initial settlement are scattered through the site.

== History ==
The site was initially founded in 1903 by CF&I to serve as a residence for miners working at the newly constructed Howard's Quarry, which began operation in 1904. The post office opened in 1904. A school and a men's club were constructed in 1914, part of the CF&I efforts to improve its standing among miners after a strike in their Southern Colorado coalfields turned deadly and resulted in the Ludlow Massacre. The school continued operation for several years, graduating students through the eighth grade. The town also had sports clubs and a local chapter of company union established as part of John D. Rockefeller Jr. and William Lyon Mackenzie King's strategy to reduce discontent among the miners. The community was abandoned in 1930.

== See also ==
- List of ghost towns in Colorado
