= Concrete, Colorado =

Unincorporated community in Colorado, US

- Unincorporated community
- Location of Concrete, Colorado. Concrete (Colorado)
- Coordinates: 38°23′00″N 104°59′52″W
- Country: United States
- State: Colorado
- County: Fremont

Government
  - Type: unincorporated community
  - Body: Fremont County
- Elevation: 5,036 ft (1,535 m)
- Time zone: UTC−07:00 (MST)
  - Summer (DST): UTC−06:00 (MDT)
- ZIP code: (Penrose) 81240
- Area codes: 719
- GNIS place ID: 193883

Concrete was one of three factory towns around the present-day Holcim plant in eastern Fremont County, Colorado, United States. The other two are Portland and Cement. All three are located south of Penrose, Colorado, and east of Florence, Colorado, along State Highway 120.

== History ==
The town was founded in 1905. The Concrete, Colorado, post office operated from May 28, 1908, until May 31, 1921. The Penrose, Colorado, post office (ZIP code 81240) now serves the area.

== See also ==
- Cañon City, CO Micropolitan Statistical Area
- Front Range Urban Corridor
