= Return to Nature Funeral Home =

Return to Nature Funeral Home was a fraudulent and criminally negligent funeral home company located in Penrose, Colorado that operated from 2019 until its exposure and shutdown in October 2023. The company purported to provide deceased individuals with a natural burial. In reality, corpses were improperly stored in a large warehouse without adequate refrigeration, resulting in severe decay to victims' bodies. In place of cremated remains, relatives of the deceased were sometimes given fake ashes consisting of pulverized concrete.

== Prosecution ==
Business owners Jon and Carie Hallford were arrested in Oklahoma in November 2023 after fleeing the state of Colorado to avoid prosecution. After being extradited to Colorado, in 2024 both plead guilty to 191 counts of corpse abuse; additionally, both also admitted to defrauding the federal Small Business Administration of nearly $900,000 in Covid-19 pandemic-era relief funds. After a judge rejected their plea agreement in November 2025 on the grounds that it was too lenient, Jon Hallford was sentenced to 40 years in prison on February 7, 2026. Carie Hallford was sentenced to 30 years in prison on April 24, 2026. Judge Bentley commented that the result of the case was a "staggeringly huge sentence" in response to public calls for a harsher sentence. Carie apologized in court and said she deserved punishment. She also alleged her marriage was abusive.

== Aftermath ==
The case prompted the state of Colorado to enact stricter regulations on the funeral home industry. Prior to 2024, Colorado's laws on funeral services were considered the laxest in the nation, requiring no licensure for funeral home directors. On May 24, 2024, Colorado governor Jared Polis signed a series of laws requiring background checks and educational requirements for those involved in the funeral industry, passed by the legislature in response to the Return to Nature case.
