= Prospect Heights =

Prospect Heights may refer to:

- Prospect Heights, Colorado
- Prospect Heights, Illinois
  - Prospect Heights station in Prospect Heights, Illinois
- Prospect Heights, New Jersey
- Prospect Heights, Brooklyn, New York

== See also ==
- Prospect Heights High School
