= Prospect Heights, Colorado =

Neighborhood in Colorado

Coordinates: 38°25′35″N 105°14′15″W

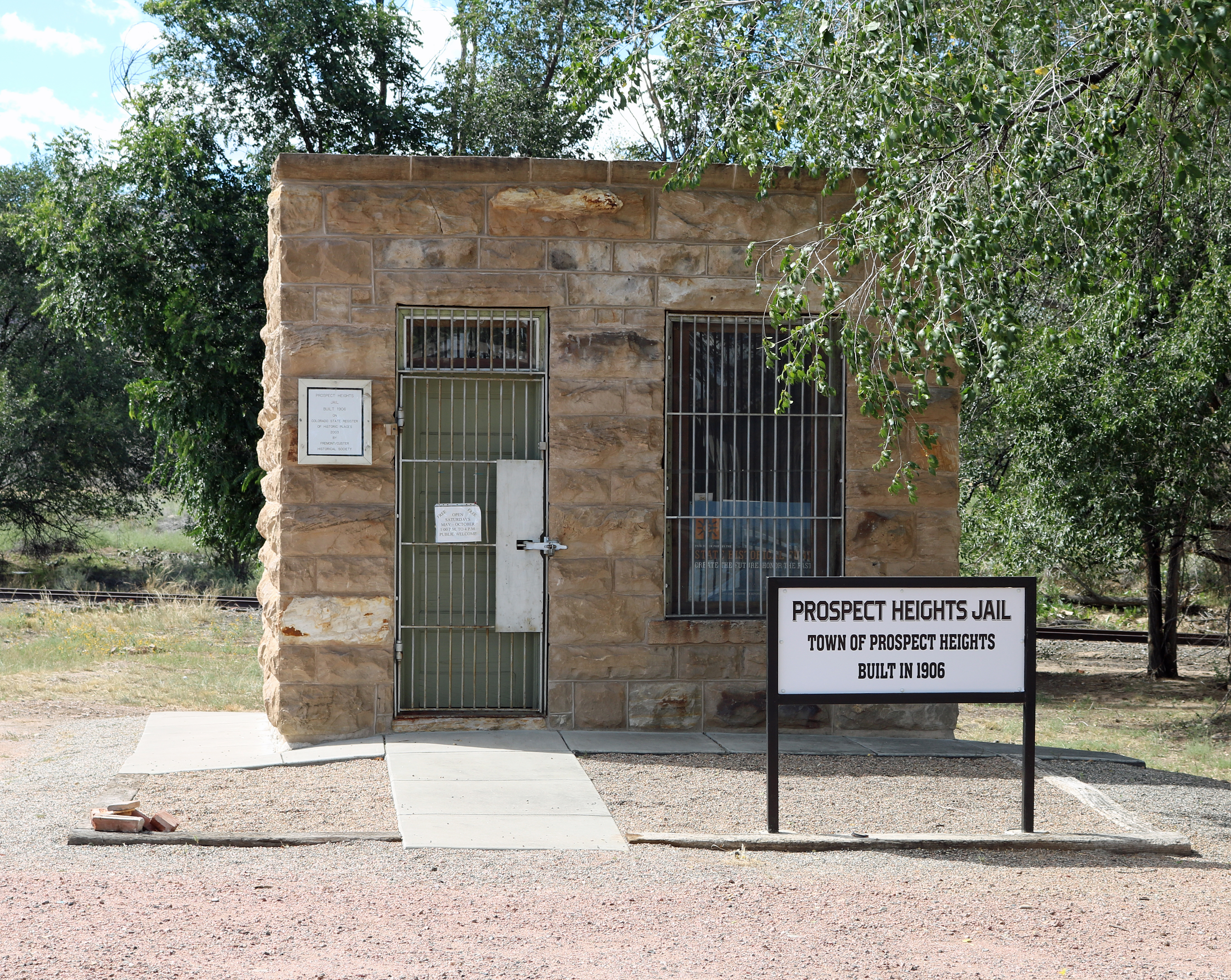
The old Prospect Heights jail on S. 4th St.

Prospect Heights, Colorado is a neighborhood of the Lincoln Park census-designated place south of Cañon City, Colorado in Fremont County. It is situated west of State Highway 115 and south of an area known as Capitol Hill.

== History ==
The neighborhood incorporated as a town on May 10, 1905, in response to Cañon City becoming a dry city and prohibiting saloons. Immediately upon Prospect Heights' incorporation, six or seven saloons immediately opened. Prospect Heights endured as an incorporated town until about 1990, when its water system collapsed and the town tapped into the Cañon City water supply. At this time the incorporated town was dissolved.

The town's jail still stands and efforts have been made to restore it as a historical landmark. The Prospect Heights jail was built in 1906 and has since been listed in the Colorado State Register of Historic Properties. Several other early buildings still exist as well, including the Prospect Heights Mercantile Store, which is now running as a store again.

The neighborhood lies at 5,433 feet (1,656 meters) elevation.
