= Colorado's 60th House of Representatives district =

American legislative district

Colorado's 60th State House of Representatives district
Representative
Stephanie Luck; R–Penrose
- Demographics: 79% White; 2% Black; 13% Hispanic; 1% Asian; 1% Native American; 5% Multiracial
- Population (2024): 91,629

Colorado's 60th House of Representatives district is one of 65 districts in the Colorado House of Representatives. It has been represented by Stephanie Luck since 2023.

== Members ==
- Stephanie Luck
- Matt Alexander
