= Lincoln Park, Colorado =

Census-designated place in Fremont County, CO, USA

- Census-designated place
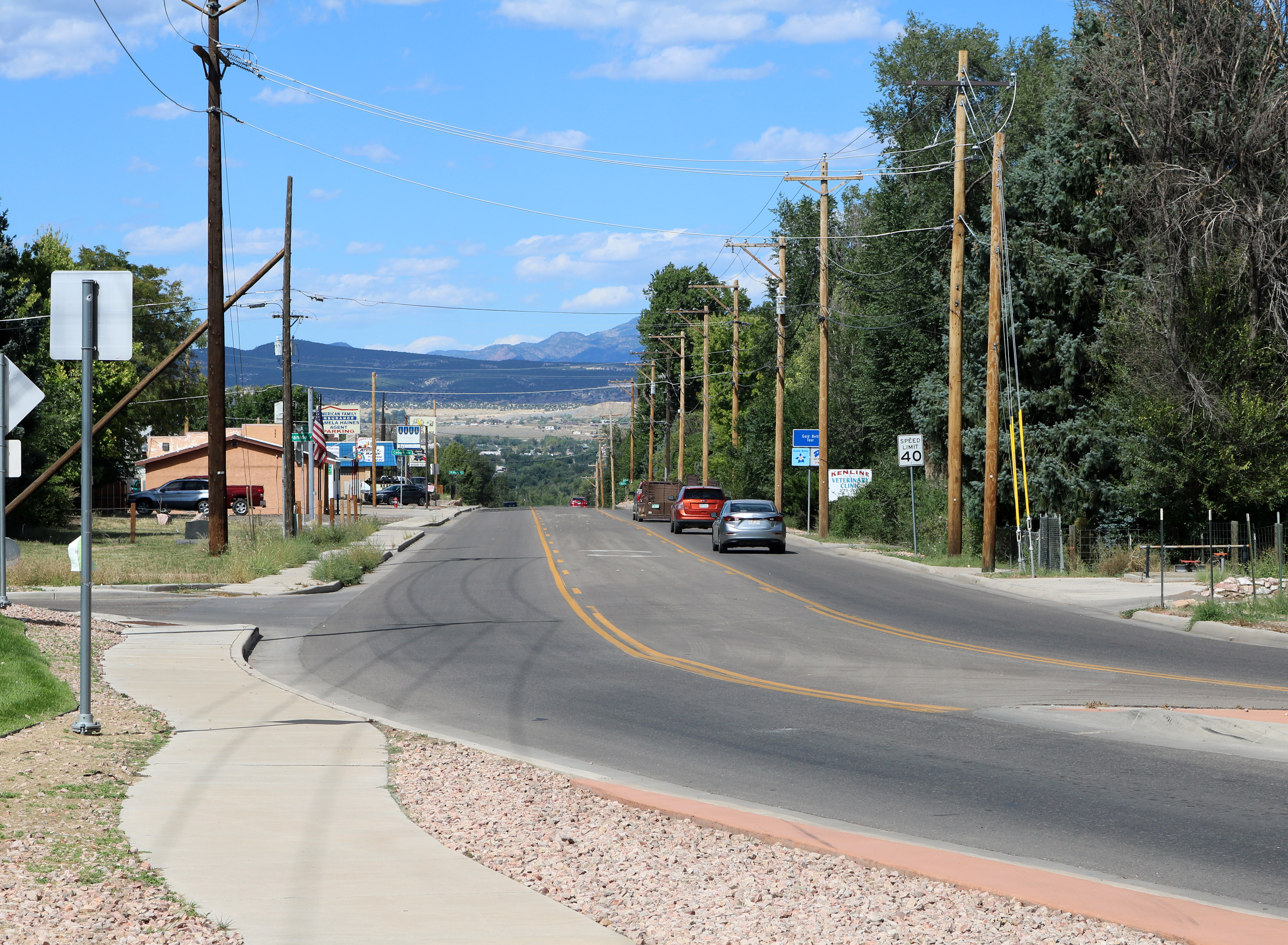
- Looking north along South 9th Street, Colorado State Highway 115 in Lincoln Park

- Location of the Lincoln Park CDP in Fremont County, Colorado
- Coordinates: 38°25′32″N 105°12′47″W
- Country: United States
- State: Colorado
- County: Fremont

Government
  - Type: Unincorporated community

Area
  - Total: 3.785 sq mi (9.804 km^{2})
  - Land: 3.785 sq mi (9.803 km^{2})
  - Water: 0.00042 sq mi (0.0011 km^{2})
- Elevation: 5,394 ft (1,644 m)

Population (2020)
  - Total: 3,934
  - Density: 1,039/sq mi (401.3/km^{2})
- Time zone: UTC-7 (MST)
  - Summer (DST): UTC-6 (MDT)
- ZIP Code: Cañon City 81212
- Area code: 719
- GNIS feature: 2408611

Lincoln Park is a census-designated place (CDP) located in Fremont County, Colorado, United States. The CDP is a part of the Cañon City, CO Micropolitan Statistical Area. The population of the Lincoln Park CDP was 3,934 at the United States Census 2020. The Cañon City post office (Zip Code 81212) serves the area.

== Geography ==
Lincoln Park is located in eastern Fremont County. It is bordered to the north and west by Cañon City, the county seat, and to the southeast by Brookside.

The former incorporated town of Prospect Heights now lies within the Lincoln Park CDP.

The Lincoln Park CDP has an area of 2,423 acres (9.804 km^{2}), including 0.27 acres (0.0011 km^{2}) of water.

== Demographics ==
The United States Census Bureau initially defined the Lincoln Park CDP for the 1950 United States census.

Lincoln Park CDP, Colorado
Year	Pop.	±%
1950	1,345	—
1960	2,085	+55.0%
1970	2,984	+43.1%
1980	3,426	+14.8%
1990	3,728	+8.8%
2000	3,904	+4.7%
2010	3,546	−9.2%
2020	3,934	+10.9%
Source: United States Census Bureau

=== 2020 census ===
As of the 2020 census, Lincoln Park had a population of 3,934. The median age was 51.4 years. 18.8% of residents were under the age of 18 and 28.4% of residents were 65 years of age or older. For every 100 females there were 100.0 males, and for every 100 females age 18 and over there were 98.3 males age 18 and over.

95.3% of residents lived in urban areas, while 4.7% lived in rural areas.

There were 1,717 households in Lincoln Park, of which 22.1% had children under the age of 18 living in them. Of all households, 49.0% were married-couple households, 21.6% were households with a male householder and no spouse or partner present, and 25.0% were households with a female householder and no spouse or partner present. About 30.9% of all households were made up of individuals and 16.9% had someone living alone who was 65 years of age or older.

There were 1,824 housing units, of which 5.9% were vacant. The homeowner vacancy rate was 1.5% and the rental vacancy rate was 7.1%.

Racial composition as of the 2020 census
Race	Number	Percent
White	3,478	88.4%
Black or African American	17	0.4%
American Indian and Alaska Native	28	0.7%
Asian	11	0.3%
Native Hawaiian and Other Pacific Islander	3	0.1%
Some other race	83	2.1%
Two or more races	314	8.0%
Hispanic or Latino (of any race)	310	7.9%

== Environmental issues ==
In 1958, Cotter Corporation, a company owned by Commonwealth Edison of Chicago, began to process uranium ore in Cañon City. In the process of mining uranium ore, the company contaminated the surrounding land, and compromised the water supply of nearby Lincoln Park, 10 miles (16 km) from ADX Florence. In a class-action lawsuit filed by 340 people, the company was accused of lowering nearby land values due to radioactive contamination both at the site of the mill and along the Santa Fe Railway. In 1983, the state of Colorado sued over these damages to the environment; settling for $15 million, Cotter Corporation promised to clean up the mill site. The company resumed work in 1999, but laid off the majority of employees in 2005 after it was determined that shipping ore from Colorado's Western Slope was cost-prohibitive. The water contamination in Lincoln Park remains, and the area has been declared a Superfund site.

== Education ==
It is in the Cañon City School District RE-1.

== See also ==
- List of census-designated places in Colorado
