= Glendale, Colorado Territory =

- Ghost town
- Location within Colorado
- Coordinates: 38°26′30″N 104°58′13″W
- Country: United States
- State: Colorado Territory
- County: Fremont County
- Time zone: UTC-7 (MST)
  - Summer (DST): UTC-6 (MDT)

Glendale, Colorado Territory is a former settlement that was established in the 1860s as a stagecoach stop and then a farming community and school in the Beaver Creek area of Penrose, Colorado. First known as the settlement of Beaver Creek, it became Glendale, and finally Penrose.

== Settlement ==
Settlers followed the Pike's Peak gold rush (July 1858 and lasted until the creation of the Territory of Colorado on February 28, 1861). Farmers were incentivized by the Homestead Act to come to the area. It was known as the Beaver Creek settlement initially, with a post office there by 1868. Then, the settlement became known as Glendale. In 1870, 22 families lived in the community, and more in 1880.

== Stage coach station and hotel ==
A stage coach stop was established along Beaver Creek, on a stage road from Old Colorado City. A two-story stone building with eleven bedrooms was constructed in 1868 by John McClure. It became known as McClure House and the Glendale Stage Stop. It is also known as the Glendale Inn Stage Coach Stop and Glendale House and Stagecoach Inn. It had a restaurant, orchards, and a garden. Corrals held 1,000 horses and mules for the stage line. The stage coach road was built by William McClelland and Bob Spotswood. The stage delivered up to 100 people per day, food, supplies, and the mail. Trappers and scouts stopped by. Cowboys and Native Americans on cattle drives from Texas camped nearby.

In 1869, the business was renamed Glendale House and, operated by its new owner Rev. John Jeffries, and by 1874, it took in boarders. Church gatherings, parties, and weddings were held there.

== Glendale school ==
The Glendale School was established, the first in the Penrose area, in a log cabin in 1868. It was rebuilt in stone in 1873 after a fire. The schoolhouse was used for community functions, like pot luck dinners. It was used as a school until 1912, when a school was built in Penrose. Only the stone foundation remains.

== Early 20th century ==
Spencer Penrose began buying up water rights by 1909. The settlement was abandoned after the flood of Red Creek and Beaver Creek on July 3, 1921. Most of the stone walls of the hotel and stage coach stop remain, but the roof and porches were burned in a fire.

== Legend ==
A woman and a man, Kathleen Cooper and Julian LaSalle, a miner from Leadville were to be married at the Glendale State Stop. LaSalle was just a few miles from Glendale when he was robbed and killed for his gold. Cooper, daughter of a rancher, waited in a bridal dress and veil. Wedding attendees also awaited LaSalle at the stop. Cooper died about one year later of influenza. The site of their planned wedding is reported to be haunted since then.
