= Parkdale, Colorado =

Unincorporated community in Fremont County, CO, USA

Coordinates: 38°29′12″N 105°22′20″W

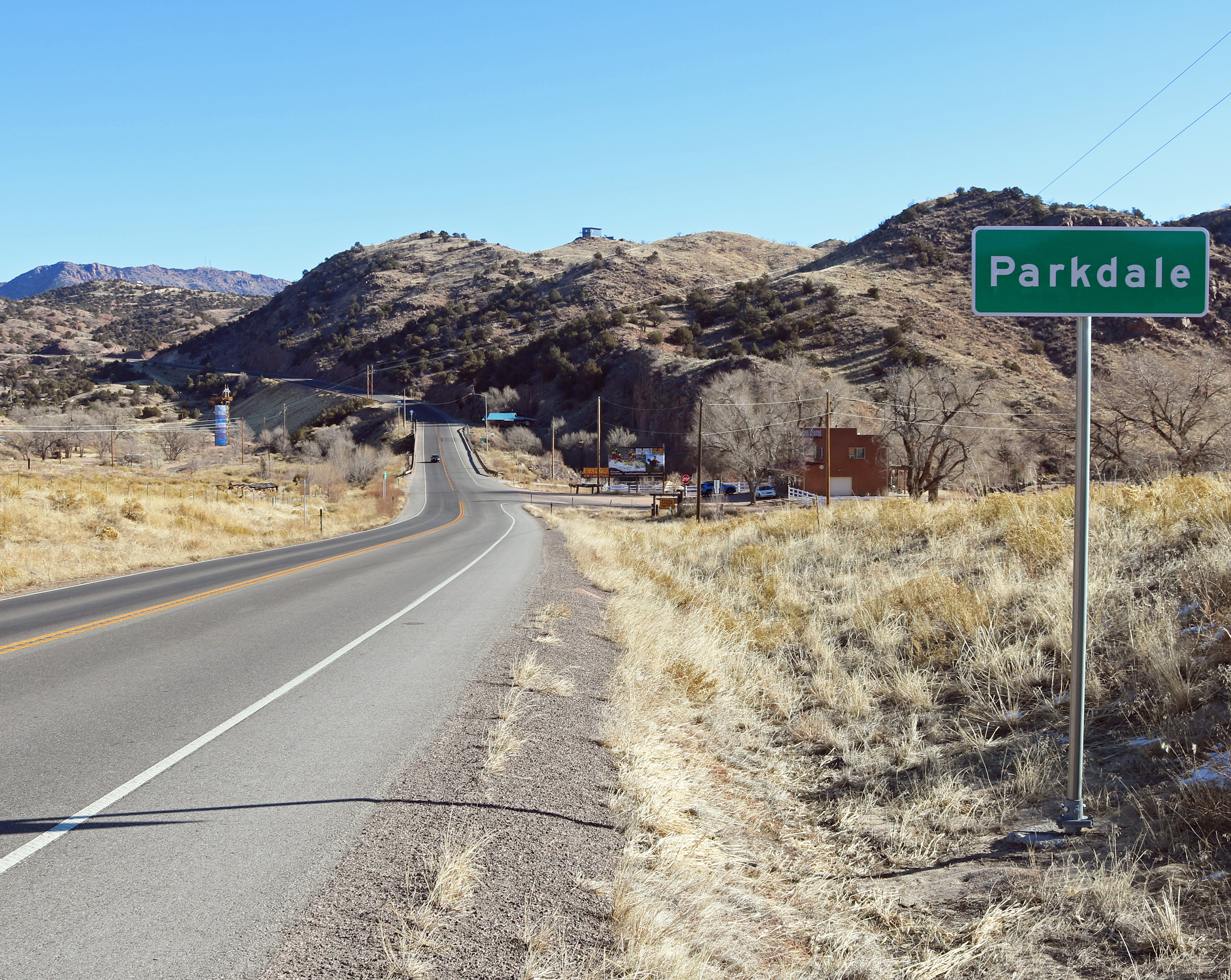
Westbound U.S. Route 50 entering Parkdale, January 2020.

Parkdale, is an unincorporated community in Fremont County, Colorado, United States. It is located along U.S. Highway 50 at an elevation of 5,732 feet (1,747 m).

== Attractions ==
The Arkansas River flows through Parkdale, and it is home to whitewater rafting and the Parkdale Recreation Area, a unit of the Arkansas Headwaters Recreation Area. The Royal Gorge Route Railroad, which starts in Cañon City, turns around in Parkdale and heads back again through the Royal Gorge and back to Cañon City. The place where it reverses its journey is known as Parkdale Siding. Martin Marietta operates the Parkdale Quarry, which produces materials used in road construction and other industries. Several zip line companies also operate in Parkdale.
