= Brookside, Colorado =

Statutory town in Fremont County, Colorado, United States

- Statutory town
- Town of Brookside
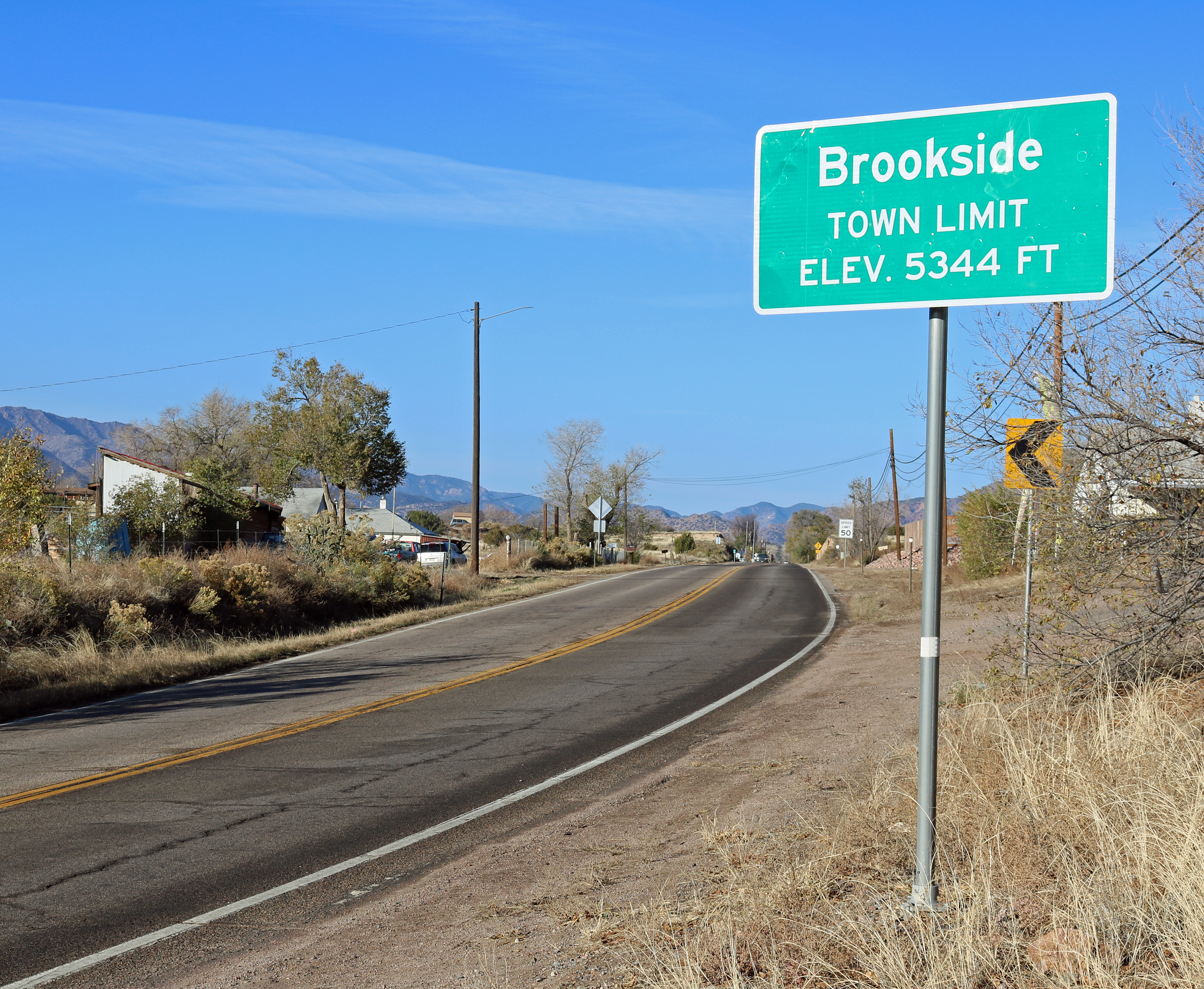
- Entering from the east on Highway 115.

- Location of the Town of Brookside in Fremont County, Colorado
- Coordinates: 38°24′49″N 105°11′27″W
- Country: United States
- State: Colorado
- County: Fremont

Government
  - Type: Statutory town

Area
  - Total: 0.474 sq mi (1.227 km^{2})
  - Land: 0.474 sq mi (1.227 km^{2})
  - Water: 0 sq mi (0.000 km^{2})
- Elevation: 5,348 ft (1,630 m)

Population (2020)
  - Total: 236
  - Density: 498/sq mi (192/km^{2})
- Time zone: UTC−07:00 (MST)
  - Summer (DST): UTC−06:00 (MDT)
- ZIP code: Cañon City CO 81212
- Area code: 719
- GNIS town ID: 2411733
- FIPS code: 08-09115
- Website: townofbrookside.colorado.gov

Brookside is a statutory town located in Fremont County, Colorado, United States. The town population was 236 at the 2020 United States census.

== History ==
The Brookside, Colorado, post office operated from May 21, 1888, until March 15, 1909. The Town of Brookside was incorporated in 1913. Brookside postal addresses are now served by the Cañon City, Colorado post office (ZIP code 81212).

== Geography ==
At the 2020 United States census, the town had a total area of 303 acres (1.227 km^{2}), all of it land.

== Demographics ==
Historical population
Census	Pop.	Note	%±
1920	202		—
1930	198		−2.0%
1940	196		−1.0%
1950	175		−10.7%
1960	163		−6.9%
1970	173		6.1%
1980	178		2.9%
1990	183		2.8%
2000	219		19.7%
2010	233		6.4%
2020	236		1.3%
U.S. Decennial Census

Brookside is a part of the Cañon City, CO Micropolitan Statistical Area.

As of the census of 2000, there were 219 people, 85 households, and 62 families residing in the town. The population density was 507.5 inhabitants per square mile (195.9/km^{2}). There were 88 housing units at an average density of 203.9 per square mile (78.7/km^{2}). The racial makeup of the town was 96.35% White, 0.46% Native American, 0.46% from other races, and 2.74% from two or more races. Hispanic or Latino of any race were 10.96% of the population.

There were 85 households, out of which 28.2% had children under the age of 18 living with them, 63.5% were married couples living together, 5.9% had a female householder with no husband present, and 25.9% were non-families. 23.5% of all households were made up of individuals, and 11.8% had someone living alone who was 65 years of age or older. The average household size was 2.58 and the average family size was 3.02.

In the town, the population was spread out, with 23.3% under the age of 18, 5.5% from 18 to 24, 26.9% from 25 to 44, 26.0% from 45 to 64, and 18.3% who were 65 years of age or older. The median age was 42 years. For every 100 females, there were 97.3 males. For every 100 females age 18 and over, there were 102.4 males.

The median income for a household in the town was $34,688, and the median income for a family was $40,833. Males had a median income of $33,333 versus $26,875 for females. The per capita income for the town was $14,841. About 13.8% of families and 13.7% of the population were below the poverty line, including 29.6% of those under the age of eighteen and none of those 65 or over.

== Education ==
It is in the Cañon City School District RE-1.

== See also ==
- Cañon City, CO Micropolitan Statistical Area
- Front Range Urban Corridor
