= Hunts Peak =

Mountain in the state of Colorado

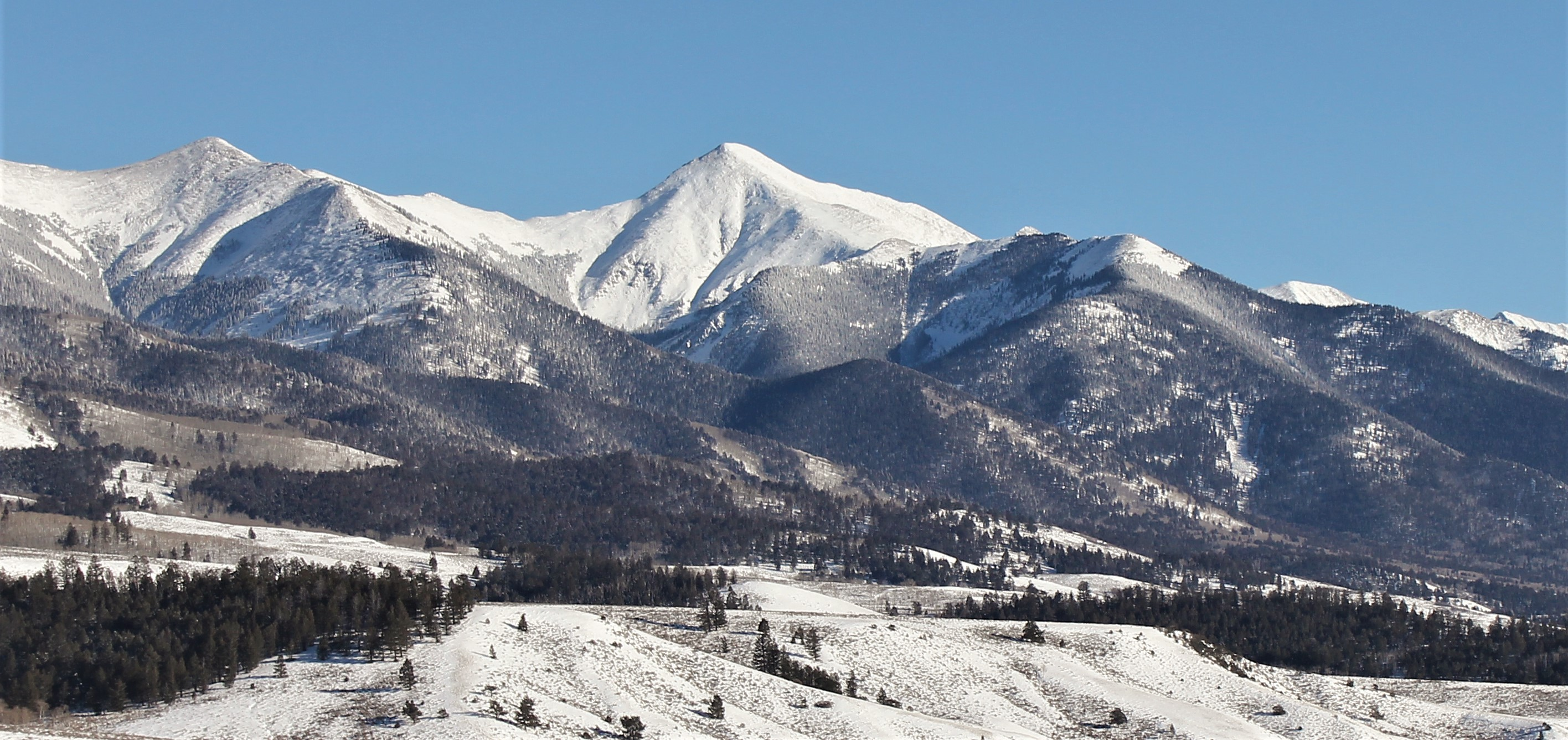
- Northwest aspect, from Highway 285

Highest point
- Elevation: 13,071 ft (3,984 m)
- Prominence: 871 ft (265 m)
- Parent peak: Bushnell Peak (13,110 ft)
- Isolation: 4.21 mi (6.78 km)
- Coordinates: 38°22′59″N 105°56′44″W

Geography
- Location within Colorado Location within the United States
- Country: United States
- State: Colorado
- County: Fremont County / Saguache County
- Protected area: Sangre de Cristo Wilderness
- Parent range: Rocky Mountains; Sangre de Cristo Range
- Topo map: USGS Wellsville

Geology
- Mountain type: Fault block
- Rock type: Metamorphic rock

Climbing
- Easiest route: class 2 hiking

Hunts Peak is a 13,071-foot (3,984 m) mountain summit on the boundary shared by Fremont County and Saguache County, in Colorado, United States.

== Description ==
Hunts Peak is set 17 miles (27 km) east of the Continental Divide in the Sangre de Cristo Range which is a subrange of the Rocky Mountains. It is the second-highest summit in Fremont County and can be seen from Highway 285 near Poncha Pass. The conspicuous mountain is located 11 miles (18 km) south of the community of Salida in the Sangre de Cristo Wilderness, on land managed by San Isabel National Forest and Rio Grande National Forest. Precipitation runoff from the mountain's west slope drains to San Luis Creek and the east slope drains to the Arkansas River. Topographic relief is significant as the summit rises 1,726 feet (526 m) above Hunts Lake in 0.57 mile (0.92 km). The mountain's toponym was officially adopted in 1906 by the United States Board on Geographic Names, and has been reported in publications since at least 1892, if not earlier. Alexander Cameron Hunt (1825–1894) was the fourth governor of the Territory of Colorado (1867–1869) who would later own land in the adjacent San Luis Valley.

== Climate ==
According to the Köppen climate classification system, Hunts Peak is located in an alpine subarctic climate zone with cold, snowy winters, and cool to warm summers. Due to its altitude, it receives precipitation all year, as snow in winter, and as thunderstorms in summer, with a dry period in late spring.

== See also ==
- Thirteener
