= Park Center, Colorado =

Cesnsus-designated place in Fremont County, CO, USA

- Census-designated place
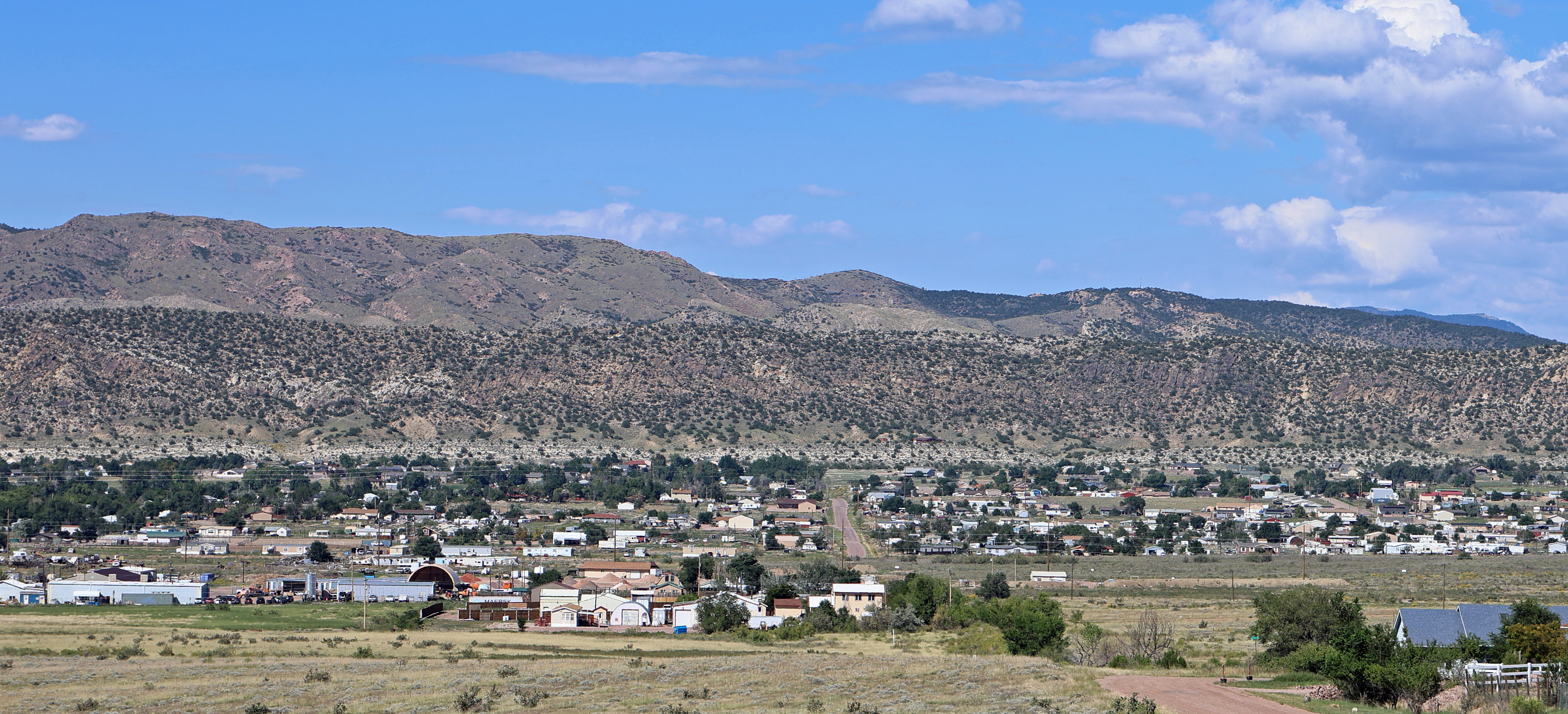
- Park Center in 2025

- Location of the Park Center CDP in the State of Colorado
- Coordinates: 38°29′40″N 105°14′12″W
- Country: United States
- State: Colorado
- County: Fremont

Government
  - Type: Unincorporated community

Area
  - Total: 6.575 sq mi (17.028 km^{2})
  - Land: 6.549 sq mi (16.962 km^{2})
  - Water: 0.025 sq mi (0.066 km^{2})
- Elevation: 5,518 ft (1,682 m)

Population (2020)
  - Total: 2,953
  - Density: 450.9/sq mi (174.1/km^{2})
- Time zone: UTC-7 (MST)
  - Summer (DST): UTC-6 (MDT)
- ZIP Code: Cañon City 81212
- Area code: 719
- GNIS feature: 2805920

Park Center is a census-designated place (CDP) in and governed by Fremont County, Colorado, United States. The CDP is a part of the Cañon City, CO Micropolitan Statistical Area. The population of the Park Center CDP was 2,953 at the United States Census 2020. The Cañon City post office (Zip Code 81212) serves the area.

== Geography ==
The Park Center CDP has an area of 4,208 acres (17.028 km^{2}), including 16 acres (0.066 km^{2}) of water.

== Demographics ==
The United States Census Bureau defined the Park Center CDP for the United States Census 2020.

Park Center CDP, Colorado
| Year | Pop. | ±% |
|---|---|---|
| 2020 | 2,953 | — |
Source: United States Census Bureau

=== 2020 census ===
As of the 2020 census, Park Center had a population of 2,953. The median age was 43.9 years. 22.9% of residents were under the age of 18 and 22.8% of residents were 65 years of age or older. For every 100 females there were 95.6 males, and for every 100 females age 18 and over there were 99.3 males age 18 and over.

78.6% of residents lived in urban areas, while 21.4% lived in rural areas.

There were 1,130 households in Park Center, of which 24.7% had children under the age of 18 living in them. Of all households, 52.1% were married-couple households, 18.6% were households with a male householder and no spouse or partner present, and 22.9% were households with a female householder and no spouse or partner present. About 26.2% of all households were made up of individuals and 12.3% had someone living alone who was 65 years of age or older.

There were 1,193 housing units, of which 5.3% were vacant. The homeowner vacancy rate was 0.5% and the rental vacancy rate was 5.4%.

Racial composition as of the 2020 census
| Race | Number | Percent |
|---|---|---|
| White | 2,557 | 86.6% |
| Black or African American | 18 | 0.6% |
| American Indian and Alaska Native | 35 | 1.2% |
| Asian | 7 | 0.2% |
| Native Hawaiian and Other Pacific Islander | 0 | 0.0% |
| Some other race | 62 | 2.1% |
| Two or more races | 274 | 9.3% |
| Hispanic or Latino (of any race) | 325 | 11.0% |

== Education ==
It is in the Cañon City School District RE-1.

== See also ==
- List of census-designated places in Colorado
