= Matt Alexander (politician) =

American politician

Member-elect of the Colorado House of Representatives from the 60th district
- Assuming office January 2027
- Succeeding: Stephanie Luck

Personal details
- Party: Republican
- Website: alexanderforco.com

Matt Alexander is an American politician. A member of the Republican Party, he is the member-elect for the 60th district of the Colorado House of Representatives. He was elected at the 2026 election. He was Cañon City School Board Director.
