= Samuel H. Atwater House =

Colorado house on National Register of Historic Places

- U.S. National Register of Historic Places
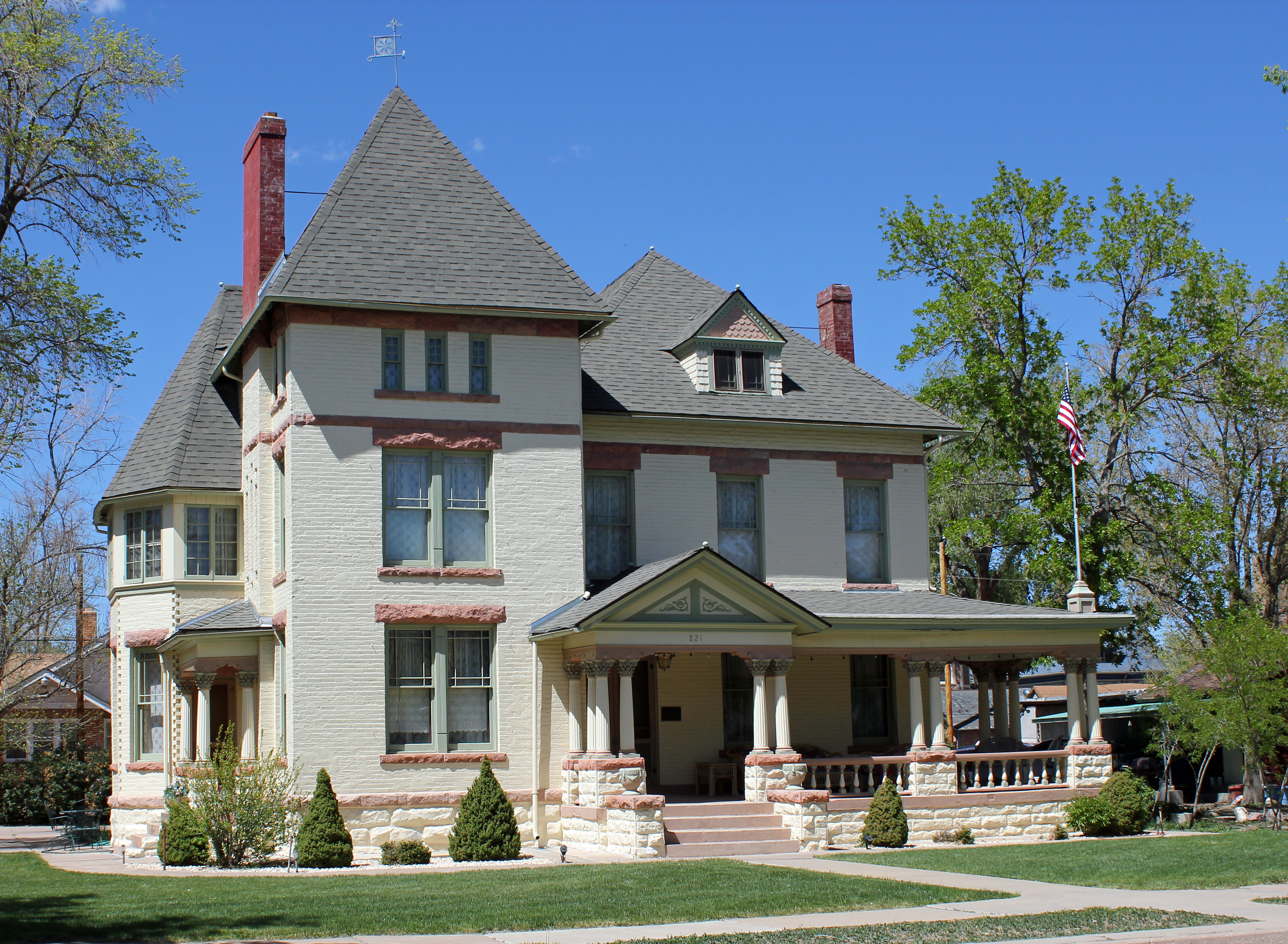

- Location within Colorado Location within the United States
- Location: 821 Macon Ave., Cañon City, Colorado
- Coordinates: 38.44386°N 105.23683°W
- Area: less than one acre
- Built: 1890
- Architectural style: Queen Anne
- NRHP reference No.: 96000241
- Added to NRHP: March 7, 1996

The Samuel H. Atwater House, at 821 Macon Ave. in Cañon City, Colorado, was built around 1890 and its porches and exterior were substantially modified in 1908. It was listed on the National Register of Historic Places in 1996.

It was designed and built in Queen Anne style in 1890. Queen Anne style does include asymmetrical massing as a basic feature, but the result here was generally assessed as aethetically unappealing. The decision to use a square tower (rather than a round tower, far more common in Queen Anne style) and other factors were blamed: it was noted that the original small side and front porches with delicate supports and spindlework, in combination with the "massive size of the square corner tower...gave the structure an awkward, unbalanced appearance."

In 1908, a renovation towards remedying the situation was undertaken. The original porches were replaced by new, larger ones, whose "classically inspired elements ... are typical of a Queen Anne subtype known as free classic"; the renovation "successfully converted the existing Queen Anne house into the free classic subtype." "The massive scale of the new front porch and its classic design elements works as a strong counterpoint to the corner tower." And the house can now be evaluated as "a good example of a local interpretation of the Queen Anne style". The house "exhibits most of the defining characteristics of the style, including:

- Asymmetrical massing;
- Corner tower and bay;
- Steeply pitched roof of irregular shape;
- Dormer;
- Scalloped and shaped shingles;
- Prominent decorative porches; and
- Contrasting wall materials."

The house was deemed significant for NRHP listing for its architecture, and also "for its association with Samuel Henry Atwater, one of the early developers of Cañon City who not only bought and sold land for residential development but was a key individual in the planning and construction of community infrastructure. Atwater platted the Orchard Park sub-division and the Atwater South Cañon Addition to Cañon City; bought two large area nurseries to supply new residents in his communities with appropriate growing stock; purchased water rights on Four Mile Creek to insure a dependable water supply for Orchard Park and the South Cañon addition; and spearheaded the funding drive which culminated in the construction of the National Register listed First Presbyterian Church."

Per History Colorado, "This 1890 house is associated with Samuel H. Atwater, an early developer of Cañon City, who not only bought and sold land for residential development but was a key individual in the planning and construction of community infrastructure."

Subsequent history includes that after Atwater and his family's occupation of the house until 1909, that William H. Dozier, an officer of the First National Bank, bought the house sometime before the Great War. Later, from the mid-1930s to the mid-1940s, Guy Hardy, owner and editor of the Cañon City Daily Record possessed the home as an investment. At some point the house was renovated to become a rooming house, and " [a]pparently, 15 layers of wallpaper were removed from the dining room walls." In 1965, City Engineer Carl Babberger and his wife Enid purchased the house.
