= Holy Cross Abbey (Cañon City, Colorado) =

Historic church in Colorado, United States

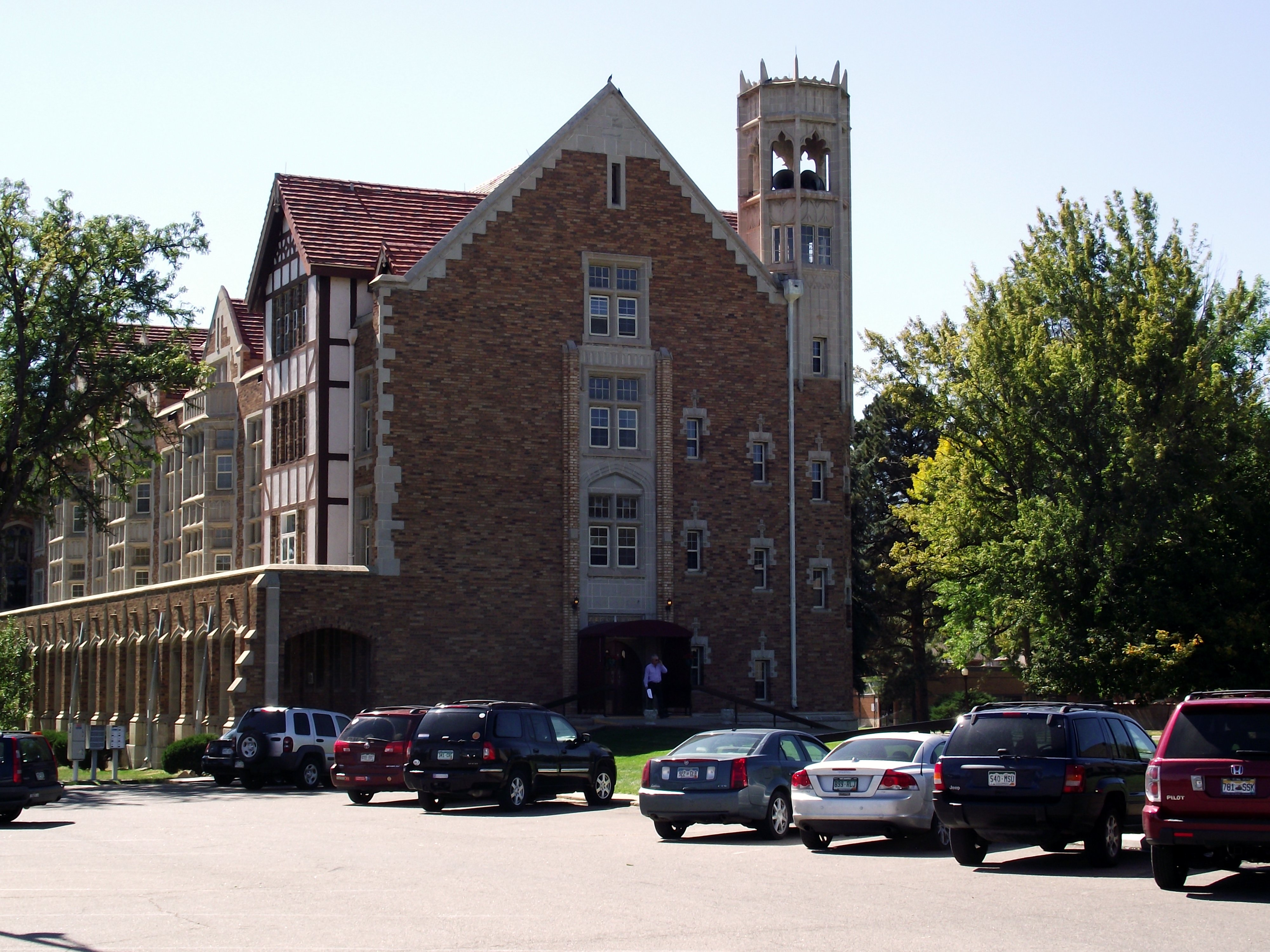
- Rear view of the former abbey
- Interactive map of Holy Cross Abbey

Monastery information
- Full name: Abbey of the Holy Cross
- Other name: Priory of St. Mary (former name)
- Order: Benedictine
- Denomination: Roman Catholic
- Established: 1886
- Disestablished: 2005
- Dedication: Exaltation of the Holy Cross
- Diocese: Pueblo

Architecture
- Status: Defunct
- Heritage designation: National Register of Historic Places
- Designated date: August 18, 1986
- Style: Gothic Revival
- Groundbreaking: 1924
- Completed date: 1925
- Closed: 2006

Site
- Coordinates: 38°26′56″N 105°12′03″W

The Abbey of the Holy Cross in Cañon City, Colorado, was a monastery of the Order of St. Benedict in the United States. It existed for nearly 120 years, operating various enterprises, including a boarding school for boys and a winery. It is listed on the National Register of Historic Places.

== History ==
=== Expansion ===
Two Benedictine monks were sent in 1886 from St. Vincent Archabbey in Latrobe, Pennsylvania, and traveled to Breckenridge, Colorado, to establish a monastic community in what was still frontier territory. They went at the invitation of Joseph Projectus Machebeuf, then the Vicar Apostolic of Colorado and Utah. Their first foundation was the Priory of St. Mary in Boulder. Additional monks followed in ensuing years.

The growth of the community led them to move to Cañon City in 1924, where a larger monastery was built in the Gothic Revival style. The house was raised to the status of an abbey at that time, and it assumed a new name. A boarding school was opened at the abbey, and initial attempts were made to establish a winery, though these were not pursued at the time.

Like many religious communities in the United States, the abbey saw its numbers grow during the 1950s and 1960s, followed by a steep decline in the following decades. The Abbey School was closed in 1985.

By the early 2000s, the community was composed of about 20 monks, mostly elderly. In 2000, the monks decided to revisit the idea of planting a vineyard to generate income. They entrusted the production to a professional viticulturist who began to produce wine the following year.

=== Decline ===
By 2005, it was determined that the monastic community was no longer viable, and in a final chapter meeting, the monks voted to dissolve it. They found homes in other monasteries, and the abbey was closed in September 2006.

=== Winery at Holy Cross Abbey ===
Other than incorporating "Holy Cross Abbey" into its name after acquiring the land from the Monastic community, the Benedictine monks of the abbey had no involvement in the creation or operation of the winery. The winery and tasting room opened to the public in 2002, welcoming visitors to its scenic Rocky Mountain vineyard.

The Winery at Holy Cross Abbey invites visitors into its tasting room, where staff guide them through a tasting flight of award-winning wines. Additional services include a VIP wine and cheese tasting during the summer months. The tasting room also sells both local and international products.

In the spring and summer, visitors may sit in an outdoor garden setting while viewing thriving vineyards growing against the backdrop of the Rocky Mountains. In the winter, visitors may taste wine beside a roaring fireplace.

==== Annual Events ====
The Winery at Holy Cross Abbey hosts and participates in several annual events. These include:

- Harvest Festival
- Winemakers Dinner
- Farm to Table Fun Run and Dinner
- Palette to Palate
- Spring Wine Extravaganza

Wines

- Monterey Chardonnay
- Cabernet Sauvignon
- 2015 Wild Cañon Harvest
- Sauvignon Blanc Reserve
- Cabernet Sauvignon Reserve
- Apple Blossom
- Syrah
- Revelation
- American Riesling
- Merlot
- Cabernet Franc
- Merlot Divinity
- Merlot Reserve
- Sangre de Cristo Nouveau
- Vineyard Sunset
