= Coaldale, Colorado =

Unincorporated community in Colorado, US

- Census-designated place
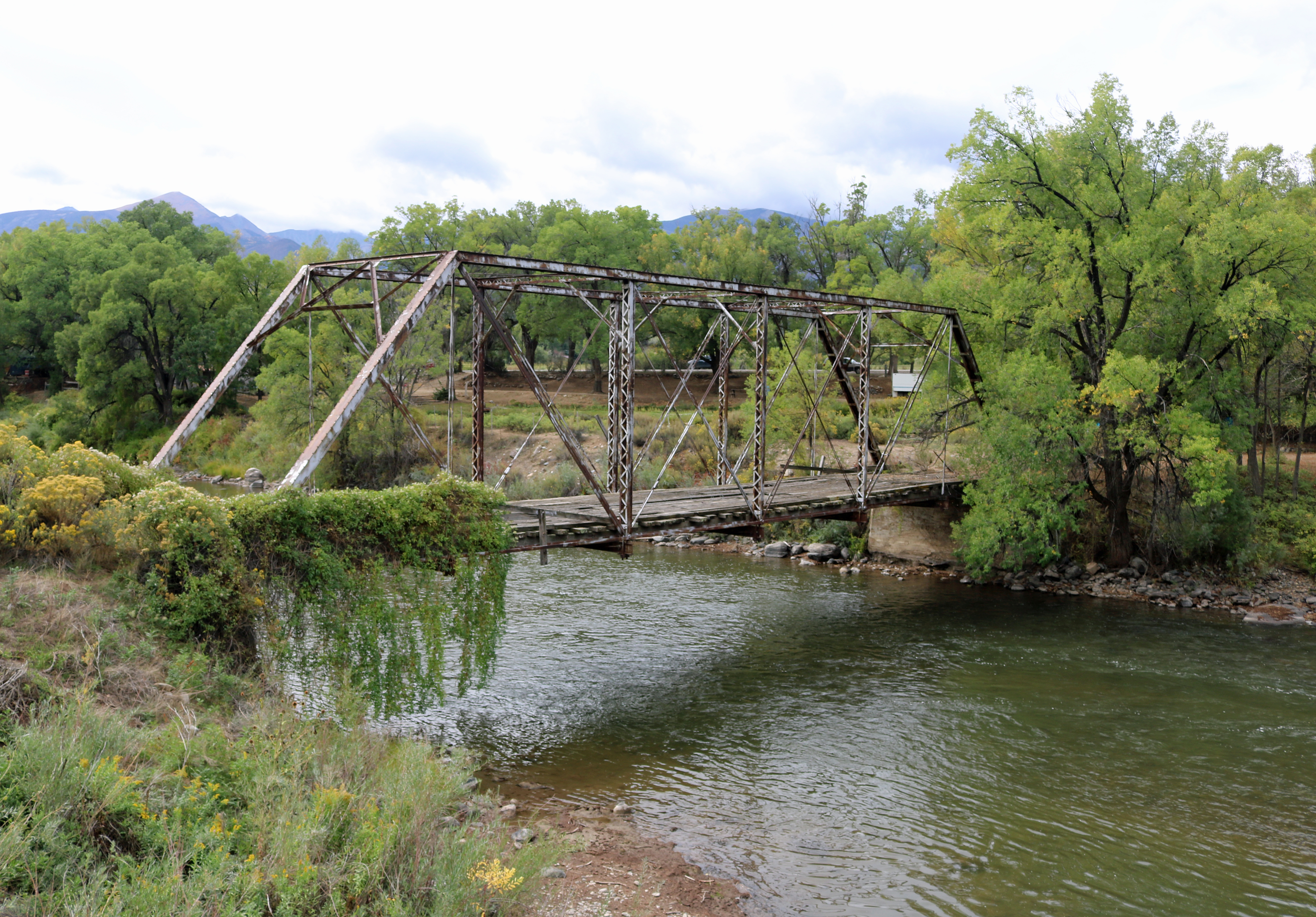
- An abandoned bridge over the Arkansas River in Coaldale

- Location of the Coaldale CDP in Fremont County, Colorado
- Coordinates: 38°21′50″N 105°48′12″W
- Country: United States
- State: Colorado
- County: Fremont
- Founded: 1891

Government
  - Type: Unincorporated community
  - Body: Fremont County

Area
  - Total: 31.048 sq mi (80.413 km^{2})
  - Land: 31.048 sq mi (80.413 km^{2})
  - Water: 0 sq mi (0.000 km^{2})
- Elevation: 6,552 ft (1,997 m)

Population (2020)
  - Total: 343
  - Density: 11.0/sq mi (4.27/km^{2})
- Time zone: UTC−07:00 (MST)
  - Summer (DST): UTC−06:00 (MDT)
- ZIP code: 81222
- Area code: 719
- GNIS town ID: 2583223
- FIPS code: 08-15440

Coaldale is an unincorporated community, a census-designated place (CDP), and a post office located in Fremont County, Colorado, United States. The CDP is a part of the Cañon City, CO Micropolitan Statistical Area. The Coaldale post office has the ZIP Code 81222. At the United States Census 2020, the population of the Coaldale CDP was 343. The unincorporated community is a part of the Cañon City, CO Micropolitan Statistical Area, the Pueblo-Cañon City, CO Combined Statistical Area, and the Front Range Urban Corridor.

== History ==
The Coaldale, Colorado, post office opened on February 16, 1891.

== Geography ==
Coaldale is located in southwestern Fremont County. It is bordered to the northwest by the community of Howard. The northeastern edge of the CDP follows the Arkansas River, and U.S. Route 50 follows the river through the CDP. Cañon City, the county seat, is 37 miles (60 km) to the east (downriver), while Salida is 21 miles (34 km) northwest (upriver).

The Coaldale CDP has an area of 19,870 acres (80.413 km^{2}), all land. The CDP extends southwest out of the Arkansas River valley up into San Isabel National Forest and the Sangre de Cristo Range. The southeastern edge of the CDP follows the Hayden Creek valley up to Hayden Pass; the southwestern edge follows the Saguache County line along the crest of the Sangre de Cristos; and the northwestern edge follows Stout Creek and Kerr Gulch Road back down to the Arkansas River valley.

== Demographics ==
The United States Census Bureau initially defined the Coaldale CDP for the United States Census 2010.

Coaldale CDP, Colorado
Year	Pop.	±%
2010	255	—
2020	343	+34.5%
Source: United States Census Bureau

== Education ==
It is in the Cotopaxi School District RE-3.

== See also ==
- Front Range Urban Corridor
