= Howard Creek (Colorado) =

Creek in Colorado

Coordinates: 38°26′37″N 105°50′04″W

Howard Creek is a stream in the U.S. state of Colorado. It was named after John Howard, a local pioneer.
