= Wellsville, Colorado =

Unincorporated community in Fremont County, CO, USA

- Unincorporated community
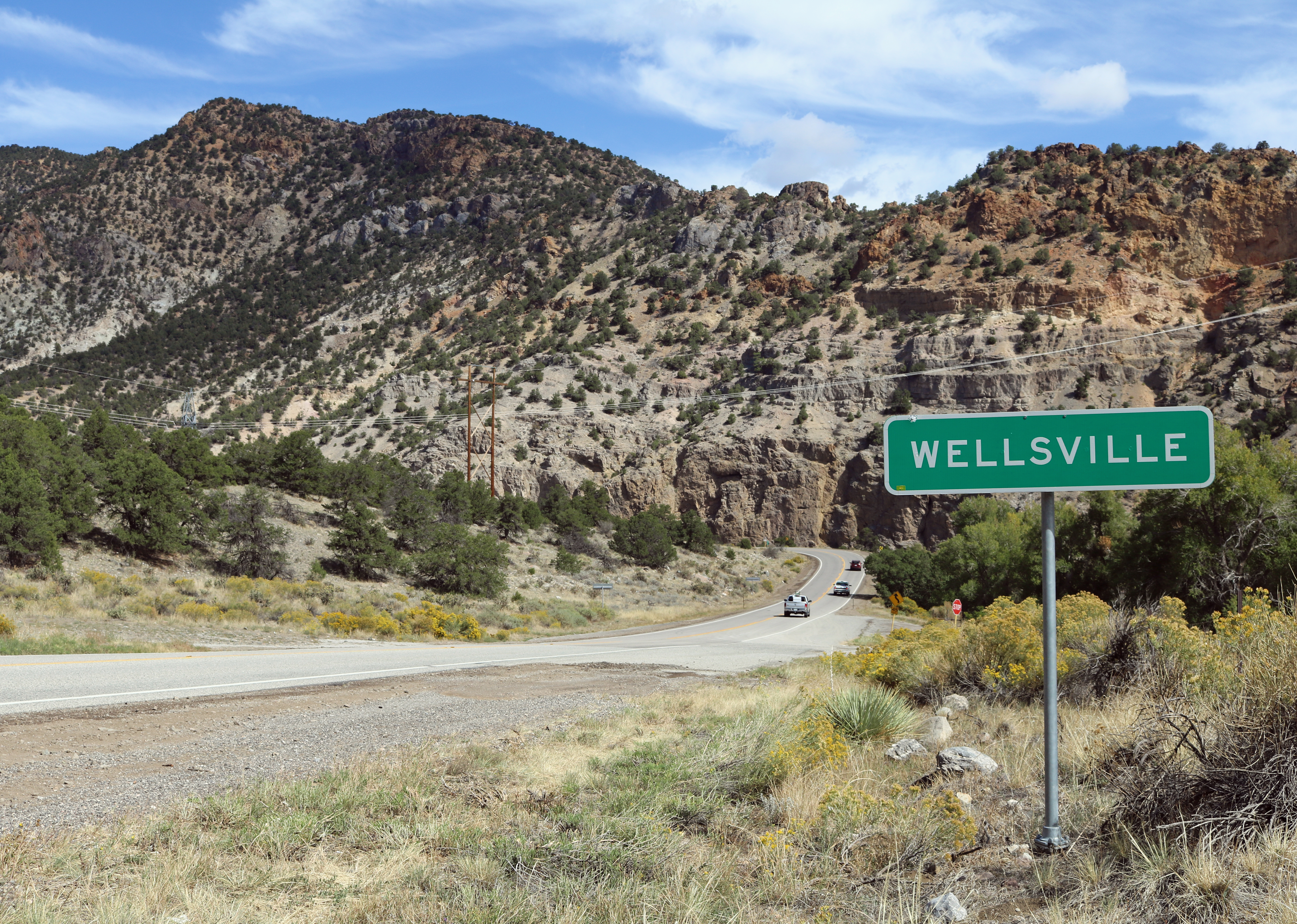
- Wellsville and U.S. Highway 50

- Location within Colorado
- Coordinates: 38°29′12″N 105°54′36″W
- Country: United States
- State: Colorado
- County: Fremont County
- Elevation: 6,893 ft (2,101 m)
- Time zone: UTC−07:00 (MST)
  - Summer (DST): UTC−06:00 (MDT)
- GNIS town ID: 191727

Wellsville, Colorado is a small unincorporated community in western Fremont County, Colorado, United States. The town straddles the banks of the Arkansas River and follows the U.S. Route 50 before the road starts winding through tight curves into Chaffee County. Wellsville is the site of US Soil's processing facility, where it mines a natural fertilizer from an ancient lake bed.

== See also ==
- Early history of Fremont County, Colorado
