= Portland, Fremont County, Colorado =

Unincorporated community in Fremont County, CO, USA

Coordinates: 38°23′28″N 105°01′30″W

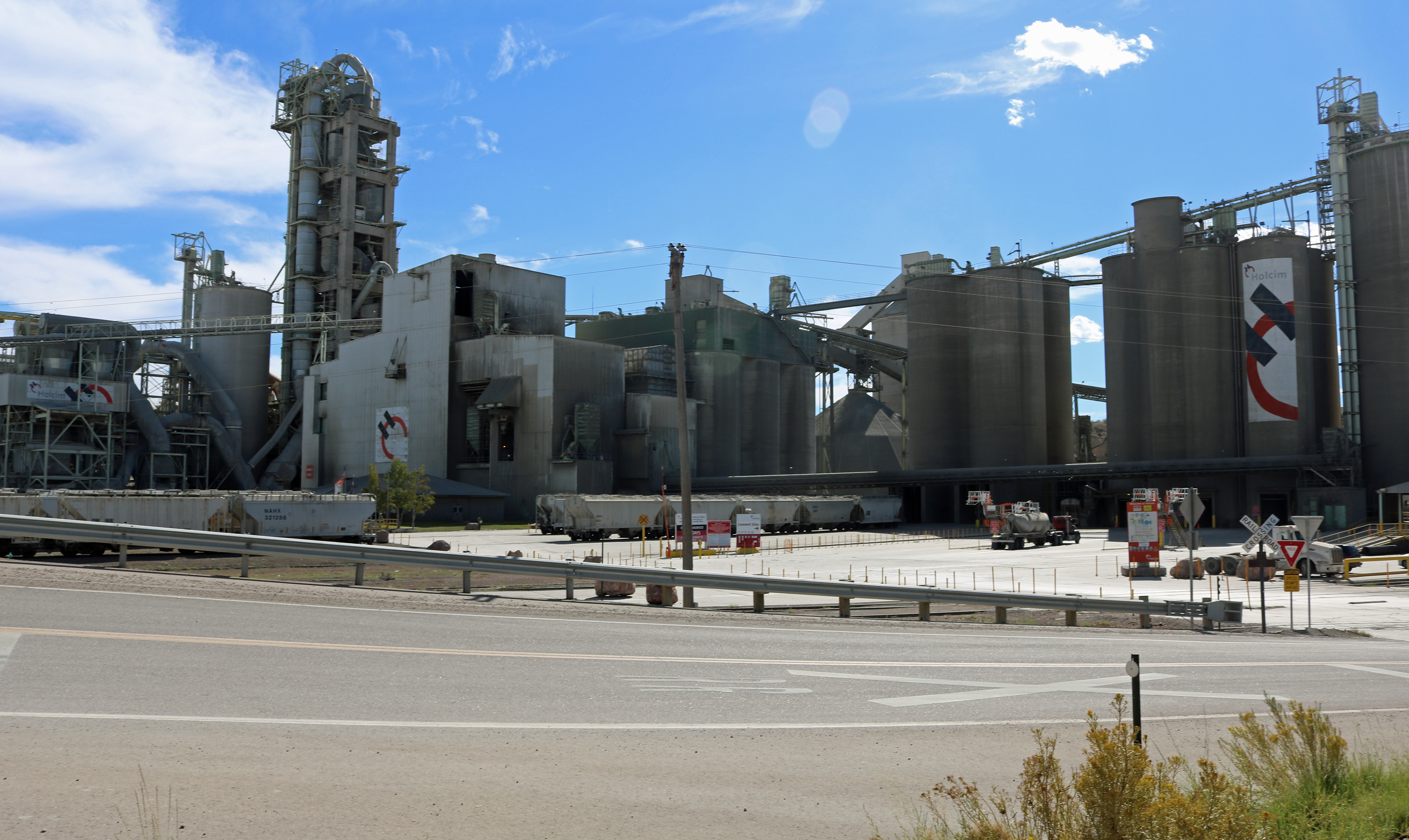
The cement plant in 2018

Portland is an unincorporated community in Fremont County, Colorado, United States.

== Description ==
The town is located along State Highway 120 in Fremont County, Colorado and is east of Florence.

== History ==
The community was one of three factory towns built surrounding the Portland Cement plant, now Holcim. The other two factory towns nearby are Concrete and Cement.

A post office called Portland was established in 1900, and remained in operation until 1952. The community was named for the Portland cement manufactured here.
