= Colorado Women's Prison =

- U.S. National Register of Historic Places
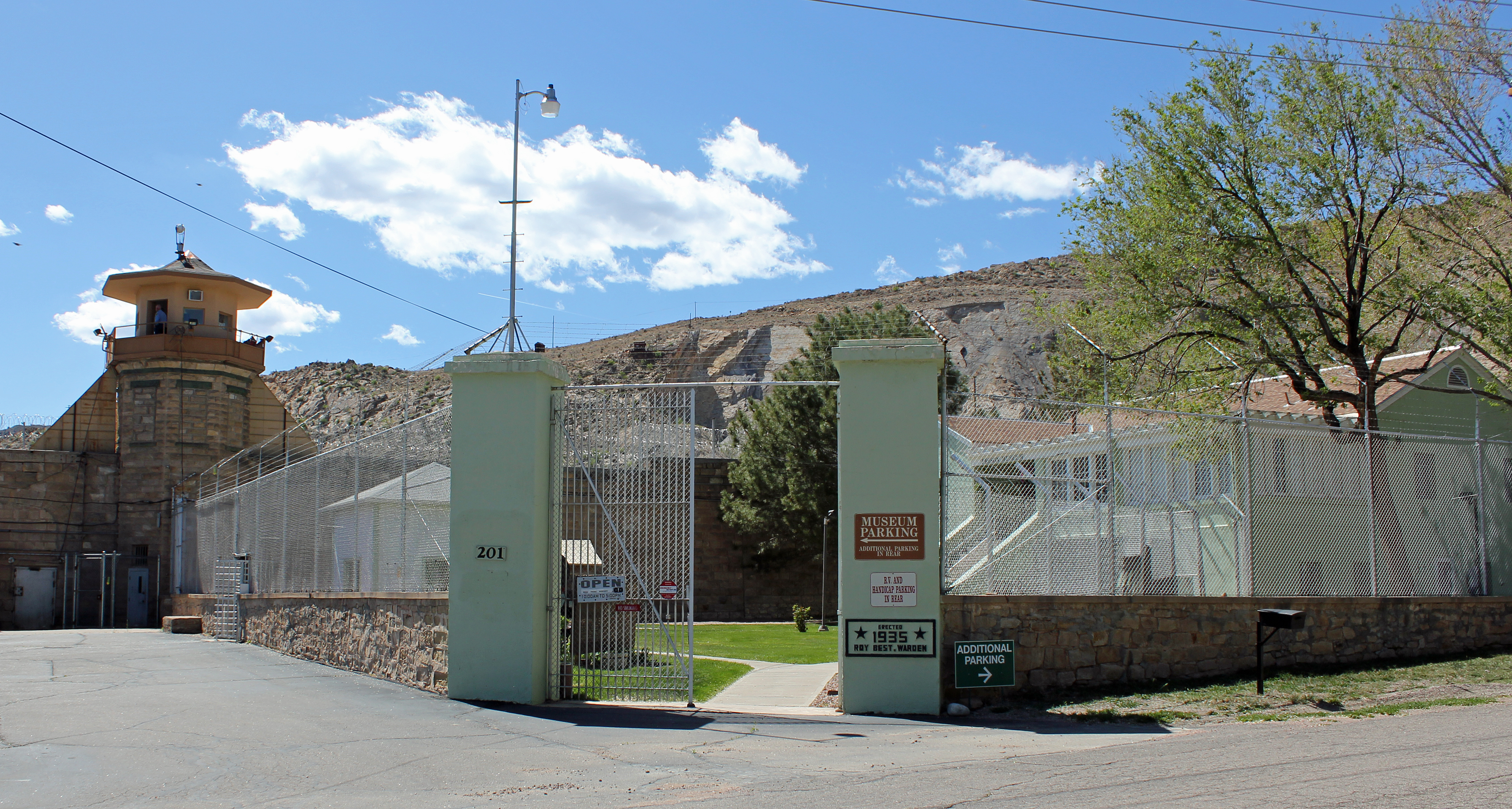

- Location within Colorado
- Location: 201 N. 1st St., Canon City, Colorado
- Coordinates: 38°26′21″N 105°14′48″W
- Area: less than one acre
- Built: 1934; 92 years ago
- Architectural style: Late 19th and 20th Century Revivals
- NRHP reference No.: 99000265
- Added to NRHP: March 5, 1999

The Colorado Women's Prison is located at 201 N. 1st St. in Canon City, Colorado. The prison was built in 1934. It was listed on the National Register of Historic Places in 1999. It is now a museum. It was listed on the National Register of Historic Places in 1999.

The women's prison was constructed with late 19th and 20th century revival architecture.
