= First Presbyterian Church (Cañon City, Colorado) =

Historic church in Colorado, United States

- U.S. National Register of Historic Places
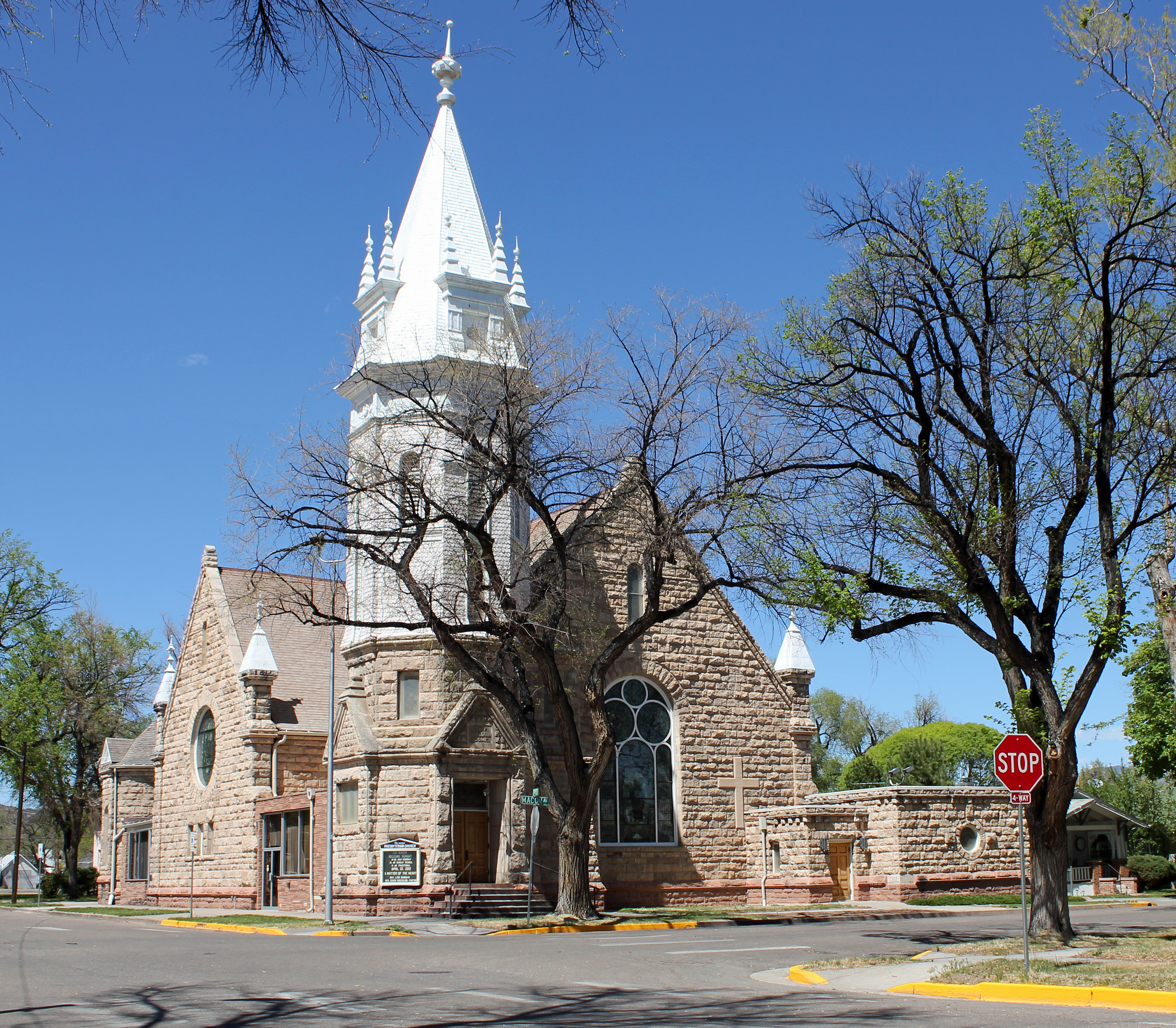

- Location within Colorado Location within the United States
- Location: 701 Macon Ave., Cañon City, Colorado
- Coordinates: 38°26′35″N 105°14′18″W
- Area: 0.2 acres (0.081 ha)
- Built: 1900-02
- Architect: Bradbury & Rittenhouse
- Architectural style: Late Victorian
- NRHP reference No.: 83001319
- Added to NRHP: September 1, 1983

The First Presbyterian Church in Cañon City, Colorado, which has also been known as United Presbyterian Church, was completed in 1902 and was added to the National Register of Historic Places in 1983.

The church was founded in August 1872.

Its building, constructed during 1900–02, is a cruciform church with an "over-sized tower on the southwest corner of the church. The base, which contains the formal entrance to the building, is in stone; the upper half of which is shingled and has arched louvered openings. The tower is capped by a classical entablature and topped by a fancifully detailed spire."

It was designed by architect C.C. Rittenhouse. It was built by Ward Construction and stone cutters were German immigrants Korvel and Sell.
