= Swissvale, Colorado =

Unincorporated community in Fremont County, CO, USA

Coordinates: 38.479°N 105.892°W

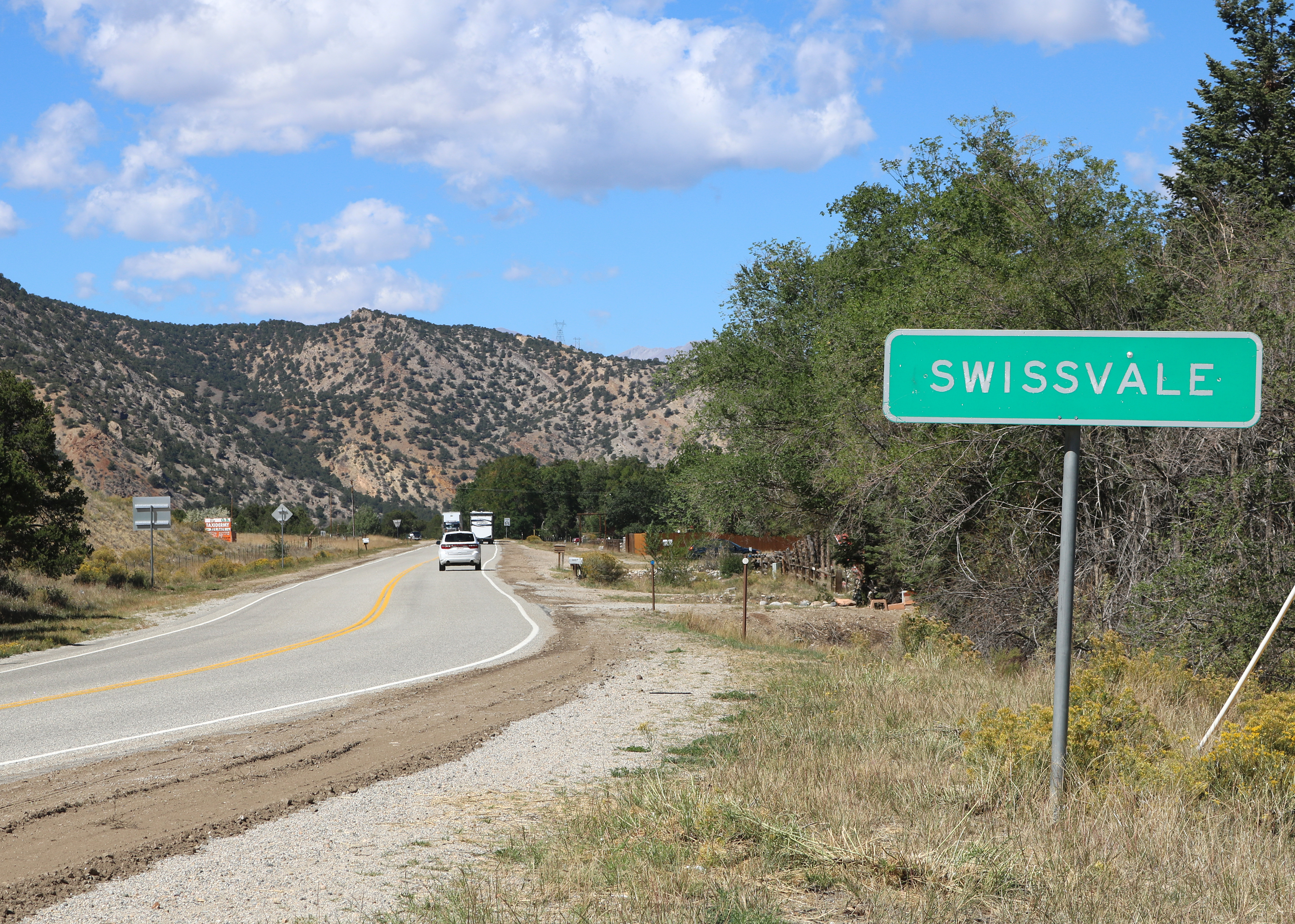
Eastbound US 50 entering Swissvale, September 2018

Swissvale, Colorado is a small, rural unincorporated community in western Fremont County, Colorado, United States. It is located along U.S. Route 50.

== See also ==
- Early history of Fremont County, Colorado
