= Colorado State Highway 120 =

State highway in Colorado, United States

State Highway 120
- Map of Fremont County in south central Colorado with SH 120 highlighted in red

Route information
- Maintained by CDOT
- Length: 7.186 mi (11.565 km)

Major junctions
- West end: SH 115 near Florence
- East end: US 50 near Penrose

Location
- Country: United States
- State: Colorado
- Counties: Fremont

Highway system
- Colorado State Highway System; Interstate; US; State; Scenic
| ← SH 119 | → SH 121 |

State Highway 120 (SH 120) is a 7.186-mile-long (11.565 km) state highway in Fremont County, Colorado. SH 120's western terminus is at SH 115 east of Florence, and the eastern terminus is at U.S. Route 50 (US 50) east of Penrose.

== Route description ==
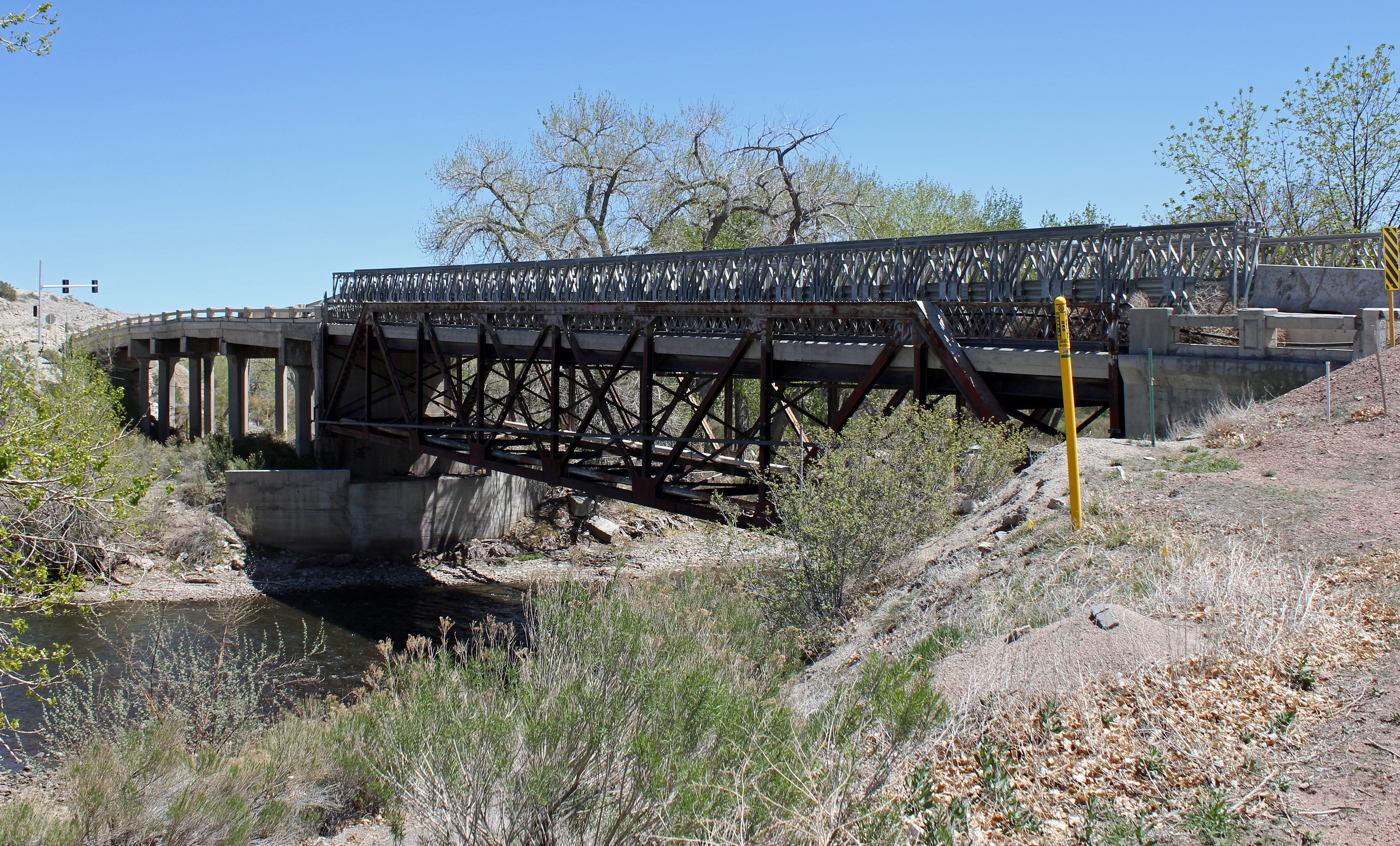
The Portland Bridge, listed on the National Register of Historic Places, carries SH 120 over the Arkansas River

SH 120 starts at a junction with SH 115 east of Florence, heading east across the Arkansas River and ending at a junction with US 50 just east of Penrose.

== Major intersections ==
The entire route is in Fremont County.

| Location | mi | km | Destinations | Notes |
|---|---|---|---|---|
| | 0.000 | 0.000 | SH 115 – Florence, Colorado Springs | Western terminus |
| | 7.186 | 11.565 | US 50 | Eastern terminus |
1.000 mi = 1.609 km; 1.000 km = 0.621 mi

== See also ==
- List of state highways in Colorado
