= Howard, Colorado =

Census-designated place in Fremont County, CO, USA

- Census-designated place
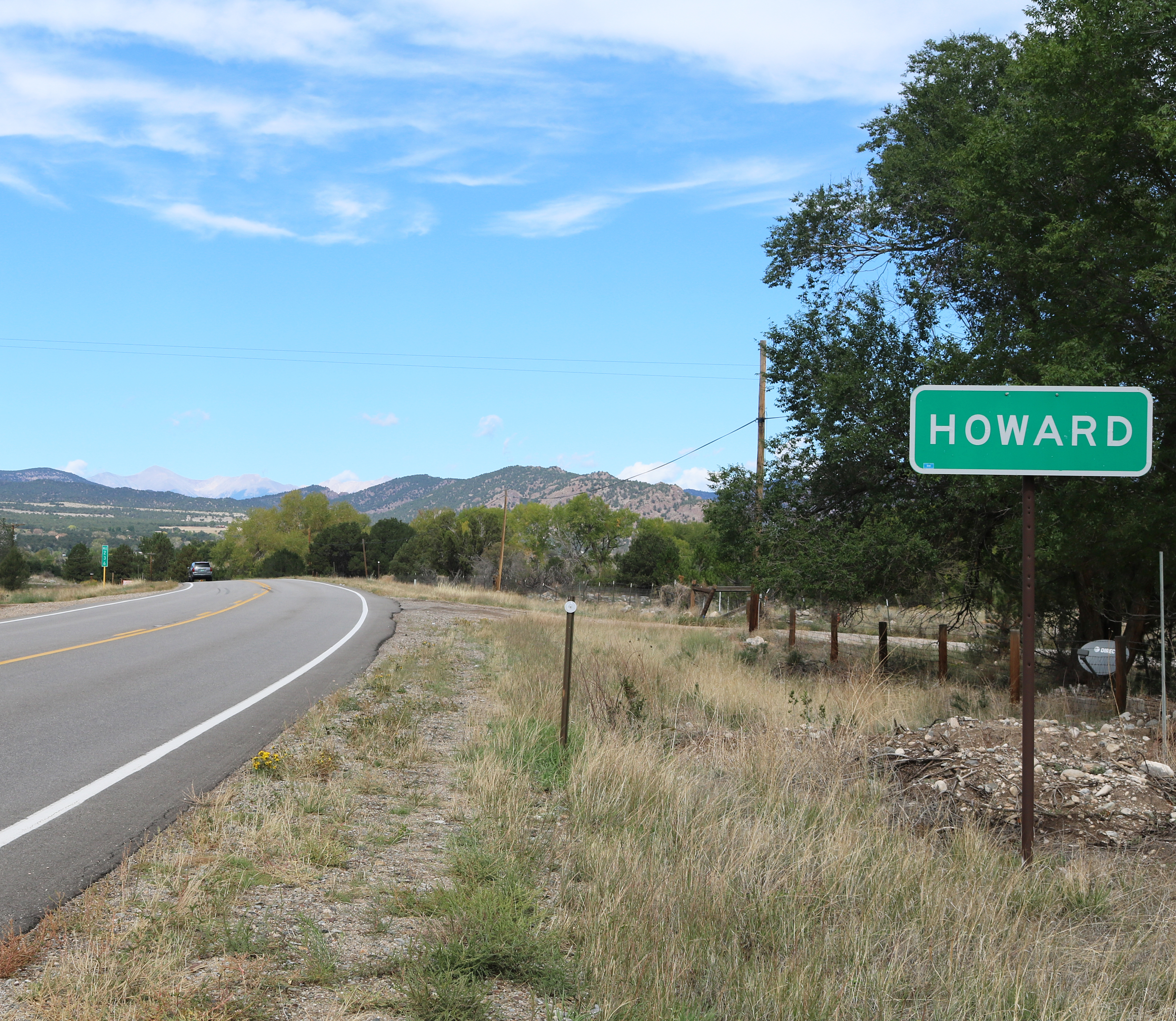
- Entering Howard from the east on U.S. Route 50

- Location of the Howard CDP in Fremont County, Colorado.
- Coordinates: 38°23′10″N 105°52′12″W
- Country: United States
- State: Colorado
- County: Fremont

Government
  - Type: Unincorporated community

Area
  - Total: 16.741 sq mi (43.360 km^{2})
  - Land: 16.741 sq mi (43.360 km^{2})
  - Water: 0 sq mi (0.000 km^{2})
- Elevation: 7,405 ft (2,257 m)

Population (2020 census)
  - Total: 852
  - Density: 50.9/sq mi (19.6/km^{2})
- Time zone: UTC-7 (MST)
  - Summer (DST): UTC-6 (MDT)
- ZIP code: 81233
- Area code: 719
- GNIS town ID: 2583248

Howard is a census-designated place (CDP) and post office in and governed by Fremont County, Colorado, United States. The CDP is a part of the Cañon City, CO Micropolitan Statistical Area. The Howard post office has the ZIP Code 81233. At the United States Census 2020, the population of the Howard CDP was 852.

== History ==
The Howard Post Office has been in operation since 1882. The community has the name of John Howard, a local pioneer.

== Geography ==
Howard is located in southwestern Fremont County, not far from the geographic center, or precise east-west, north-south middle point of Colorado. U.S. Route 50 passes through the CDP, leading northwest 13 miles (21 km) to Salida and east 46 miles (74 km) to Cañon City, the Fremont County seat. Howard is bordered to the southeast by Coaldale.

The Howard CDP has an area of 10,714 acres (43.360 km^{2}), all land. The CDP boundaries extend southwest from the Arkansas River Valley up the eastern slopes of the Sangre de Cristo Range within San Isabel National Forest.

== Demographics ==
The United States Census Bureau initially defined the Howard CDP for the United States Census 2010.

Howard CDP, Colorado
| Year | Pop. | ±% |
|---|---|---|
| 2010 | 723 | — |
| 2020 | 852 | +17.8% |
Source: United States Census Bureau

== Education ==
Almost all of it is in the Cotopaxi School District RE-3, while a piece extends into the Salida School District R-32.

== See also ==
- List of census-designated places in Colorado
