= Penrose, Colorado =

Unincorporated community in Fremont County, CO, USA

- Census-designated place
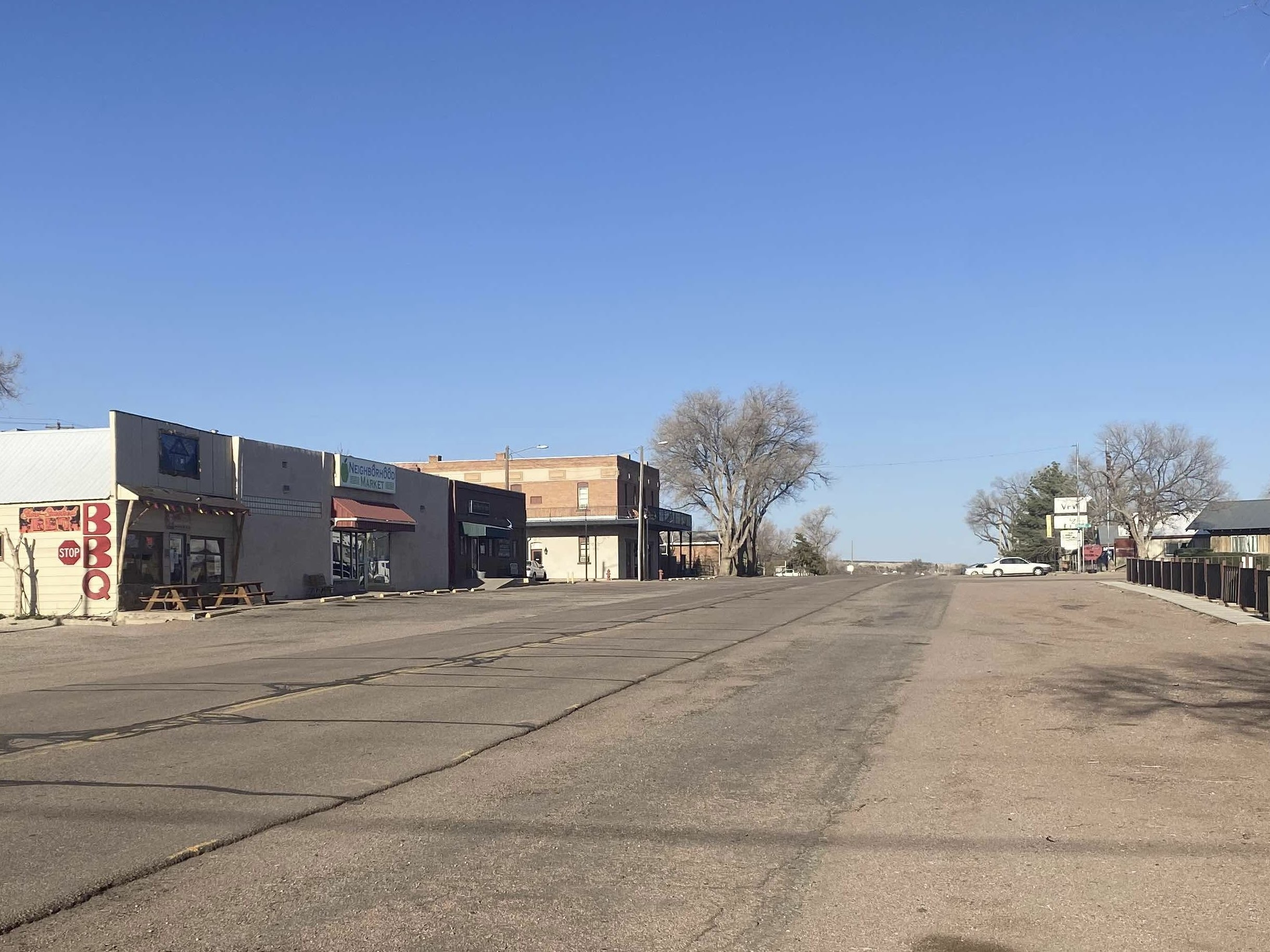
- Looking east along Broadway, Penrose's main street
- Nickname: "Model Rocket Capital of the World"
- Location of the Penrose CDP in Fremont County, Colorado.
- Coordinates: 38°25′07″N 104°59′18″W
- Country: United States
- State: Colorado
- County: Fremont

Area
  - Total: 17.846 sq mi (46.221 km^{2})
  - Land: 17.846 sq mi (46.221 km^{2})
  - Water: 0 sq mi (0.000 km^{2})
- Elevation: 5,309 ft (1,618 m)

Population (2020)
  - Total: 3,685
  - Density: 206.5/sq mi (79.73/km^{2})
- Time zone: UTC-7 (MST)
  - Summer (DST): UTC-6 (MDT)
- ZIP Code: 81240
- Area code: 719
- GNIS feature ID: 2409053
- Website: https://www.penrosechamber.org/

Penrose is a census-designated place (CDP) and post office located in and governed by Fremont County, Colorado, United States. The CDP is a part of the Cañon City, CO Micropolitan Statistical Area. The Penrose post office has the ZIP Code 81240. At the United States Census 2020, the population of the Penrose CDP was 3,685.

== History ==
Settlers followed the Pike's Peak gold rush (July 1858 and lasted until the creation of the Territory of Colorado on February 28, 1861). Farmers were incentivized by the Homestead Act to come to the area. A stage coach stop was established along Beaver Creek, which was known as the Beaver Creek settlement initially, with a post office there by 1868. Then, the settlement became known as Glendale. It had a stagecoach stop and hotel named Glendale Inn Stage Coach Stop as well as other names. A school was established there in 1868 and operated until 1912, when a school was established in Penrose. It is east or the eastern part of present-day Penrose.

The community was named after Spencer Penrose.

Penrose gained national media attention after a local funeral home, the Return to Nature Funeral Home, was raided by the Fremont County Sheriff's Office in October 2023 due to complaints of a foul smell emanating from the area. The raid revealed 189 improperly-stored dead bodies. The FBI was then called on to help with the investigation. In October 2024, the Funeral Home owners, Jon and Carie Hallford, pleaded guilty in federal court to conspiracy to commit wire fraud for misusing relief money. They were also charged in state court for abusing corpses, money laundering, theft and forgery. In November 2024, the Hallford's pleaded guilty in state court to multiple counts of abusing corpses. The couple was then scheduled for sentencing the following year in both state and federal court. In March 2025, Carie Hallford withdrew her guilty plea in federal court and is now facing trial. In June 2025, Jon Hallford was sentenced to 20 years in prison for his federal wire fraud case. In February 2026, Jon was sentenced in state court to 40 years in prison for abusing corpses. In March 2026, Carie was sentenced to 18 years in federal court for the wire fraud conviction. In April 2026, Carie was sentenced to 30 years in state court for abusing corpes.

== Geography ==
The Penrose CDP has an area of 11,421 acres (46.221 km^{2}), all land.

== Demographics ==
The United States Census Bureau initially defined the Penrose CDP for the 1990 United States census.

Penrose CDP, Colorado
Year	Pop.	±%
1990	2,235	—
2000	4,070	+82.1%
2010	3,582	−12.0%
2020	3,685	+2.9%
Source: United States Census Bureau

=== 2020 census ===
As of the 2020 census, Penrose had a population of 3,685. The median age was 49.6 years. 17.7% of residents were under the age of 18 and 24.6% of residents were 65 years of age or older. For every 100 females, there were 102.5 males, and for every 100 females age 18 and over, there were 101.5 males age 18 and over.

0.0% of residents lived in urban areas, while 100.0% lived in rural areas.

There were 1,495 households in Penrose, of which 22.2% had children under the age of 18 living in them. Of all households, 55.8% were married-couple households, 17.7% were households with a male householder and no spouse or partner present, and 19.5% were households with a female householder and no spouse or partner present. About 23.2% of all households were made up of individuals and 11.3% had someone living alone who was 65 years of age or older.

There were 1,604 housing units, of which 6.8% were vacant. The homeowner vacancy rate was 0.9% and the rental vacancy rate was 4.9%.

Racial composition as of the 2020 census
Race	Number	Percent
White	3,247	88.1%
Black or African American	8	0.2%
American Indian and Alaska Native	53	1.4%
Asian	30	0.8%
Native Hawaiian and Other Pacific Islander	2	0.1%
Some other race	107	2.9%
Two or more races	238	6.5%
Hispanic or Latino (of any race)	349	9.5%

=== 2010 census ===
As of the 2010 census, there were 3,582 people, 1,454 households, and 1,044 families residing in the CDP. The population density was 107.2 inhabitants per square mile (41.4/km^{2}). There were 1,575 housing units at an average density of 47.2 units per square mile (18.2 units/km^{2}). The racial makeup of the CDP was 94.7% White, 0.2% African American, 1.3% Native American, 0.4% Asian, 1.1% from other races, and 2.3% from two or more races. Hispanic or Latino of any race were 8.7% of the population.

There were 1,454 households, out of which 23.3% had children under the age of 18 living with them, 58.4% were married couples living together, 8.8% had a female householder with no husband present, and 28.2% were non-families. 22.2% of all households were made up of individuals, and 9.1% had someone living alone who was 65 years of age or older. The average household size was 2.46 and the average family size was 2.86.

In the CDP, the population was spread out, with 23.2% under the age of 19, 3.9% from 20 to 24, 20.1% from 25 to 44, 35.9% from 45 to 64, and 17% who were 65 years of age or older. The median age was 47 years, jumping up from 39 years in the 2000 census. For every 100 females, there were 102.6 males. For every 100 females age 18 and over, there were 100.8 males.

=== Income and poverty ===
According to the American Community Survey (2008–2012), the median income for a household in the CDP was $47,951, up from $35,638 in the 2000 Census, and the median income for a family was $54,693. Males had a median income of $49,125 versus $35,093 for females. The per capita income for the CDP was $22,774. About 14.5% of families and 16.8% of the population were below the poverty line, including 29.7% of those under age 18 and 7.4% of those age 65 or over.

== Transportation ==
Penrose is located just north of the intersection of US 50 and SH 115; 115 runs north 34 miles (55 km) to become Nevada Avenue in Colorado Springs. Penrose lies between Pueblo, 30 miles (48 km) to the southeast, and Cañon City, 12 miles (19 km) to the west, on US 50. Rail service existed briefly before World War I. The Fremont County Airport (1V6), usually called the Cañon City airport, actually has a Penrose address. Penrose is part of Colorado's Bustang network. It is on the Alamosa-Pueblo Outrider line.

=== Major highways ===
- US 50
- SH 115
- SH 120

== Economics ==
Many residents commute to work in Colorado Springs, or at the prisons of Florence or Cañon City, or at Holcim in Portland, southeast of town. Penrose has a single traffic light, a volunteer-run fire station, a trucking company, a gas station, a Veterans of Foreign Wars hall, an elementary school (graduates attend high school in Florence), a doctor's office, a post office, a library, a small grocery store, the Estes Industries model rocket factory, three small restaurants, and several other businesses.

== Education ==
Fremont RE-2 School District, which covers the CDP,. operates Penrose Elementary School. It also operates a 7–12 school in Florence: Florence Junior/Senior High School.

== See also ==
- List of census-designated places in Colorado
