= Fremont County, Colorado =

County in Colorado, United States

- County
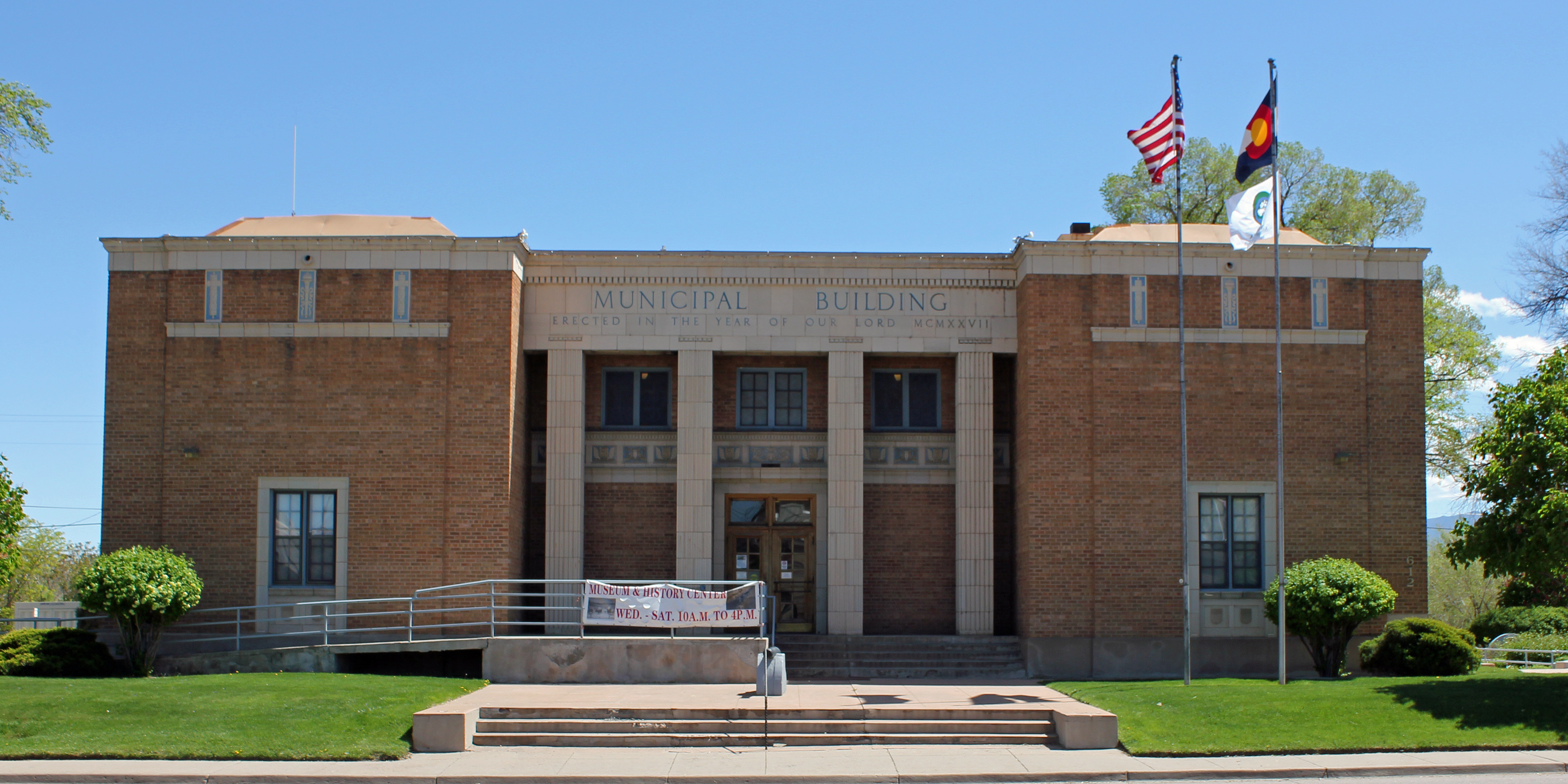
- Cañon City Municipal Building

- Flag

- Location within the U.S. state of Colorado
- Coordinates: 38.48°N 105.44°W
- Country: United States
- State: Colorado
- Founded: November 1, 1861
- Named for: John C. Frémont
- Seat: Cañon City
- Largest city: Cañon City

Area
  - Total: 1,534 sq mi (3,970 km^{2})
  - Land: 1,533 sq mi (3,970 km^{2})
  - Water: 0.9 sq mi (2.3 km^{2}) 0.06%

Population (2020)
  - Total: 48,939
  - Estimate (2025): 50,039 ▲
  - Density: 31.92/sq mi (12.33/km^{2})
- Time zone: UTC−7 (Mountain)
  - Summer (DST): UTC−6 (MDT)
- Congressional district: 7th
- Website: www.fremontcountyco.gov

Fremont County is a county located in the U.S. state of Colorado. As of the 2020 census, the population was 48,939. The county seat is Cañon City. The county is named for 19th-century explorer and presidential candidate John C. Frémont.

Fremont County comprises the Cañon City, CO Micropolitan Statistical Area, which is also included in the Pueblo-Cañon City, CO Combined Statistical Area.

Rural Fremont County is the location of 15 prisons; most of these are operated by the state. ADX Florence, the only federal Supermax prison in the United States, is in an unincorporated area in Fremont County, south of Florence, and is part of the Federal Correctional Complex, Florence. As of March 2015, Fremont County leads the nation among all counties as the one with the largest proportion of persons incarcerated. Prisoners are counted as part of the county population in the census, and 20% of residents are held in the prisons in the county.

== History ==
Fremont County was founded in 1861, in central Colorado. It is named for John C. Frémont.

== Geography ==
According to the U.S. Census Bureau, the county has a total area of 1,534 square miles (3,970 km^{2}), of which 1,533 square miles (3,970 km^{2}) is land and 0.9 square miles (2.3 km^{2}) (0.06%) is water.

=== Adjacent counties ===
- Teller County - north
- El Paso County - northeast
- Pueblo County - southeast
- Custer County - south
- Saguache County - southwest
- Chaffee County - northwest
- Park County - northwest

=== Major highways ===
- U.S. Highway 50
- State Highway 9
- State Highway 67
- State Highway 69
- State Highway 115
- State Highway 120

=== National protected areas ===
- Pike National Forest
- San Isabel National Forest
- Sangre de Cristo Wilderness

=== State protected area ===
- Arkansas Headwaters Recreation Area

=== National scenic byway ===
- Gold Belt Tour National Scenic and Historic Byway

=== Bicycle routes ===
- American Discovery Trail
- TransAmerica Trail Bicycle Route
- Western Express Bicycle Route

== Demographics ==
Historical population
Census	Pop.	Note	%±
1870	1,064		—
1880	4,735		345.0%
1890	9,156		93.4%
1900	15,636		70.8%
1910	18,181		16.3%
1920	17,883		−1.6%
1930	18,896		5.7%
1940	19,742		4.5%
1950	18,366		−7.0%
1960	20,196		10.0%
1970	21,942		8.6%
1980	28,676		30.7%
1990	32,273		12.5%
2000	46,145		43.0%
2010	46,824		1.5%
2020	48,939		4.5%
2025 (est.)	50,039	▲	2.2%
U.S. Decennial Census; 1790-1960 1900-1990; 1990-2000 2010-2020

=== 2020 census ===
As of the 2020 census, the county had a population of 48,939. Of the residents, 15.8% were under the age of 18 and 23.3% were 65 years of age or older; the median age was 46.1 years. For every 100 females there were 133.2 males, and for every 100 females age 18 and over there were 139.9 males. 50.5% of residents lived in urban areas and 49.5% lived in rural areas.

Fremont County, Colorado – Racial and ethnic composition Note: the US Census treats Hispanic/Latino as an ethnic category. This table excludes Latinos from the racial categories and assigns them to a separate category. Hispanics/Latinos may be of any race.
Race / Ethnicity (NH = Non-Hispanic)	Pop 2000	Pop 2010	Pop 2020	% 2000	% 2010	% 2020
White alone (NH)	37,408	37,647	37,713	81.07%	80.40%	77.06%
Black or African American alone (NH)	2,439	1,805	1,809	5.29%	3.85%	3.70%
Native American or Alaska Native alone (NH)	613	686	691	1.33%	1.47%	1.41%
Asian alone (NH)	224	274	332	0.49%	0.59%	0.68%
Pacific Islander alone (NH)	17	16	30	0.04%	0.03%	0.06%
Other race alone (NH)	22	19	234	0.05%	0.04%	0.48%
Mixed race or Multiracial (NH)	646	607	2,081	1.40%	1.30%	4.25%
Hispanic or Latino (any race)	4,776	5,770	6,049	10.35%	12.32%	12.36%
Total	46,145	46,824	48,939	100.00%	100.00%	100.00%

The racial makeup of the county was 81.7% White, 3.8% Black or African American, 1.7% American Indian and Alaska Native, 0.7% Asian, 0.1% Native Hawaiian and Pacific Islander, 5.1% from some other race, and 6.9% from two or more races. Hispanic or Latino residents of any race comprised 12.4% of the population.

There were 17,871 households in the county, of which 22.5% had children under the age of 18 living with them and 25.6% had a female householder with no spouse or partner present. About 30.4% of all households were made up of individuals and 16.0% had someone living alone who was 65 years of age or older.

There were 20,243 housing units, of which 11.7% were vacant. Among occupied housing units, 76.0% were owner-occupied and 24.0% were renter-occupied. The homeowner vacancy rate was 1.9% and the rental vacancy rate was 6.9%.

=== 2000 census ===
As of the 2000 census, there were 46,145 people, 15,232 households, and 10,494 families residing in the county. The population density was 30 people per square mile (12 people/km^{2}). There were 17,145 housing units at an average density of 11 units per square mile (4.2 units/km^{2}). The racial makeup of the county was 89.52% White, 5.34% Black or African American, 1.53% Native American, 0.50% Asian, 0.06% Pacific Islander, 1.22% from other races, and 1.82% from two or more races. 10.35% of the population were Hispanic or Latino of any race.

There were 15,232 households, out of which 30.00% had children under the age of 18 living with them, 56.30% were married couples living together, 9.20% had a female householder with no husband present, and 31.10% were non-families. 26.90% of all households were made up of individuals, and 12.50% had someone living alone who was 65 years of age or older. The average household size was 2.43 and the average family size was 2.93.

In the county, the population was spread out, with 20.60% under the age of 18, 7.50% from 18 to 24, 33.40% from 25 to 44, 24.00% from 45 to 64, and 14.60% who were 65 years of age or older. The median age was 39 years. For every 100 females there were 133.90 males. For every 100 females age 18 and over, there were 143.50 males.

The median income for a household in the county was $34,150, and the median income for a family was $42,303. Males had a median income of $30,428 versus $23,112 for females. The per capita income for the county was $17,420. About 8.30% of families and 11.70% of the population were below the poverty line, including 14.80% of those under age 18 and 7.40% of those age 65 or over.

== Sister cities ==
Fremont County has two sister cities, as designated by Sister Cities International:

- Kahoku, Yamagata Prefecture, Japan
- Valday, Russia

== Government ==
Fremont County (including Cañon City itself) is heavily conservative, having been won by Republicans in every election since 1964.

Fremont County is governed by a board of county commissioners, one for each of the three separate districts in the county.

- Kevin Grantham, District 1
- Debbie Bell, District 2
- Dwayne McFall, District 3

The daily operations of the county are controlled centrally from the County Administration Building, located in Cañon City. It houses the offices of both elected and appointed officials, including:

- Stacey Seifert, assessor
- Justin D Grantham, clerk and recorder
- Randy Keller, coroner
- Kathy Elliott, treasurer/public trustee
- Allen Cooper, sheriff
- John Kratz, surveyor
- Tony Carochi, county manager

United States presidential election results for Fremont County, Colorado
Year	Republican		Democratic		Third party(ies)	
Year	No.	%	No.	%	No.	%
1880	606	50.33%	530	44.02%	68	5.65%
1884	913	54.77%	583	34.97%	171	10.26%
1888	1,123	49.91%	766	34.04%	361	16.04%
1892	830	39.13%	0	0.00%	1,291	60.87%
1896	641	12.78%	4,267	85.07%	108	2.15%
1900	2,572	42.55%	3,094	51.19%	378	6.25%
1904	3,533	51.69%	3,057	44.73%	245	3.58%
1908	3,069	46.15%	3,146	47.31%	435	6.54%
1912	1,346	20.88%	2,823	43.80%	2,276	35.31%
1916	2,257	37.84%	3,395	56.92%	313	5.25%
1920	3,027	53.33%	2,339	41.21%	310	5.46%
1924	4,433	61.13%	1,550	21.37%	1,269	17.50%
1928	5,365	68.79%	2,352	30.16%	82	1.05%
1932	3,294	41.03%	4,295	53.49%	440	5.48%
1936	3,631	42.91%	4,471	52.84%	359	4.24%
1940	5,150	54.82%	4,186	44.56%	58	0.62%
1944	4,953	60.65%	3,180	38.94%	33	0.40%
1948	4,421	51.25%	4,077	47.26%	129	1.50%
1952	5,964	64.83%	3,176	34.53%	59	0.64%
1956	6,040	67.40%	2,896	32.31%	26	0.29%
1960	5,690	60.19%	3,730	39.45%	34	0.36%
1964	3,875	42.64%	5,181	57.01%	32	0.35%
1968	4,908	53.45%	3,292	35.85%	983	10.70%
1972	6,701	68.41%	2,813	28.72%	281	2.87%
1976	5,647	52.44%	4,886	45.38%	235	2.18%
1980	7,162	59.13%	3,952	32.63%	999	8.25%
1984	8,250	67.31%	3,895	31.78%	111	0.91%
1988	7,623	58.24%	5,278	40.33%	187	1.43%
1992	5,961	39.40%	5,356	35.40%	3,814	25.21%
1996	7,437	51.24%	5,344	36.82%	1,732	11.93%
2000	9,914	61.75%	5,293	32.97%	849	5.29%
2004	12,313	66.46%	5,933	32.03%	280	1.51%
2008	12,668	63.60%	6,844	34.36%	407	2.04%
2012	13,174	64.53%	6,704	32.84%	538	2.64%
2016	15,122	68.82%	5,297	24.11%	1,554	7.07%
2020	17,517	68.54%	7,369	28.83%	671	2.63%
2024	17,313	67.97%	7,526	29.55%	631	2.48%

United States Senate election results for Fremont County, Colorado2
Year	Republican		Democratic		Third party(ies)	
Year	No.	%	No.	%	No.	%
2020	17,450	68.81%	7,201	28.40%	708	2.79%

United States Senate election results for Fremont County, Colorado3
Year	Republican		Democratic		Third party(ies)	
Year	No.	%	No.	%	No.	%
2022	12,285	61.46%	6,802	34.03%	901	4.51%

Colorado Gubernatorial election results for Fremont County
Year	Republican		Democratic		Third party(ies)	
Year	No.	%	No.	%	No.	%
2022	12,087	60.54%	7,165	35.89%	713	3.57%

== Corrections and prisons ==
Colorado Department of Corrections operates several prisons in the county. The department operates the Colorado Territorial Correctional Facility in Cañon City. In addition several correctional facilities near Cañon City are located in unincorporated areas in the county. Colorado State Penitentiary, the location of the state death row and execution chamber, is in Fremont County. Other state prisons in Fremont County include Arrowhead Correctional Center, Centennial Correctional Facility, Fremont Correctional Facility, Four Mile Correctional Center, and Skyline Correctional Center.

The Colorado Women's Correctional Facility, near Cañon City in an unincorporated area, was decommissioned on June 4, 2009.

The Federal Bureau of Prisons operates the Federal Correctional Complex, Florence in Fremont County, which consists of several separate Federal prisons, including the only supermax facility in the federal system, home to many convicted terrorists and other notorious criminals.

== Communities ==
=== Cities ===
- Cañon City (County seat)
- Florence

=== Towns ===
- Brookside
- Coal Creek
- Rockvale
- Williamsburg

=== Census-designated places ===
- Coaldale
- Cotopaxi
- Howard
- Lincoln Park
- Park Center
- Penrose

=== Other unincorporated communities ===
- Concrete
- Hillside
- Parkdale
- Portland
- Swissvale
- Texas Creek
- Wellsville

=== Ghost towns ===
- Adelaide
- Calcite
- Chandler
- Siloam
- Whitehorn
- Yorkville

== Education ==
School districts include:

- Cañon City School District RE-1
- Cotopaxi School District RE-3
- Fremont RE-2 School District
- Salida School District R-32

== See also ==
- Bibliography of Colorado
- Geography of Colorado
- History of Colorado
  - Arapahoe County, Kansas Territory
  - El Paso County, Jefferson Territory
  - National Register of Historic Places listings in Fremont County, Colorado
- Index of Colorado-related articles
- List of Colorado-related lists
  - List of counties in Colorado
  - List of statistical areas in Colorado
- Outline of Colorado
  - Front Range Urban Corridor
