= Colorado State Highway 115 =

Highway in Colorado

State Highway 115
- Vietnam Veterans Memorial Highway (in general), S. Nevada Avenue (in Colorado Springs), Main Street, W. 3rd Street (in Florence), Cedar Avenue (in between Florence and Canon City), Chestnut Street, Elm Avenue, S. 9th Street (in Canon City)
- Map of central Colorado with SH 115 highlighted in red

Route information
- Maintained by CDOT
- Length: 46.99 mi (75.62 km)

Major junctions
- South end: US 50 in Cañon City
- SH 67 near Florence; US 50 in Penrose
- North end: I-25 / US 24 / US 87 in Colorado Springs

Location
- Country: United States
- State: Colorado
- Counties: Fremont, El Paso

Highway system
- Colorado State Highway System; Interstate; US; State; Scenic
← SH 114	→ SH 116

State Highway 115 (SH 115) is a state highway in the U.S. state of Colorado. SH 115's southern terminus is at U.S. Route 50 (US 50) interchange in northern Cañon City, and the northern terminus is at Interstate 25 (I-25), US 24 and US 87 in Colorado Springs.

== Route description ==
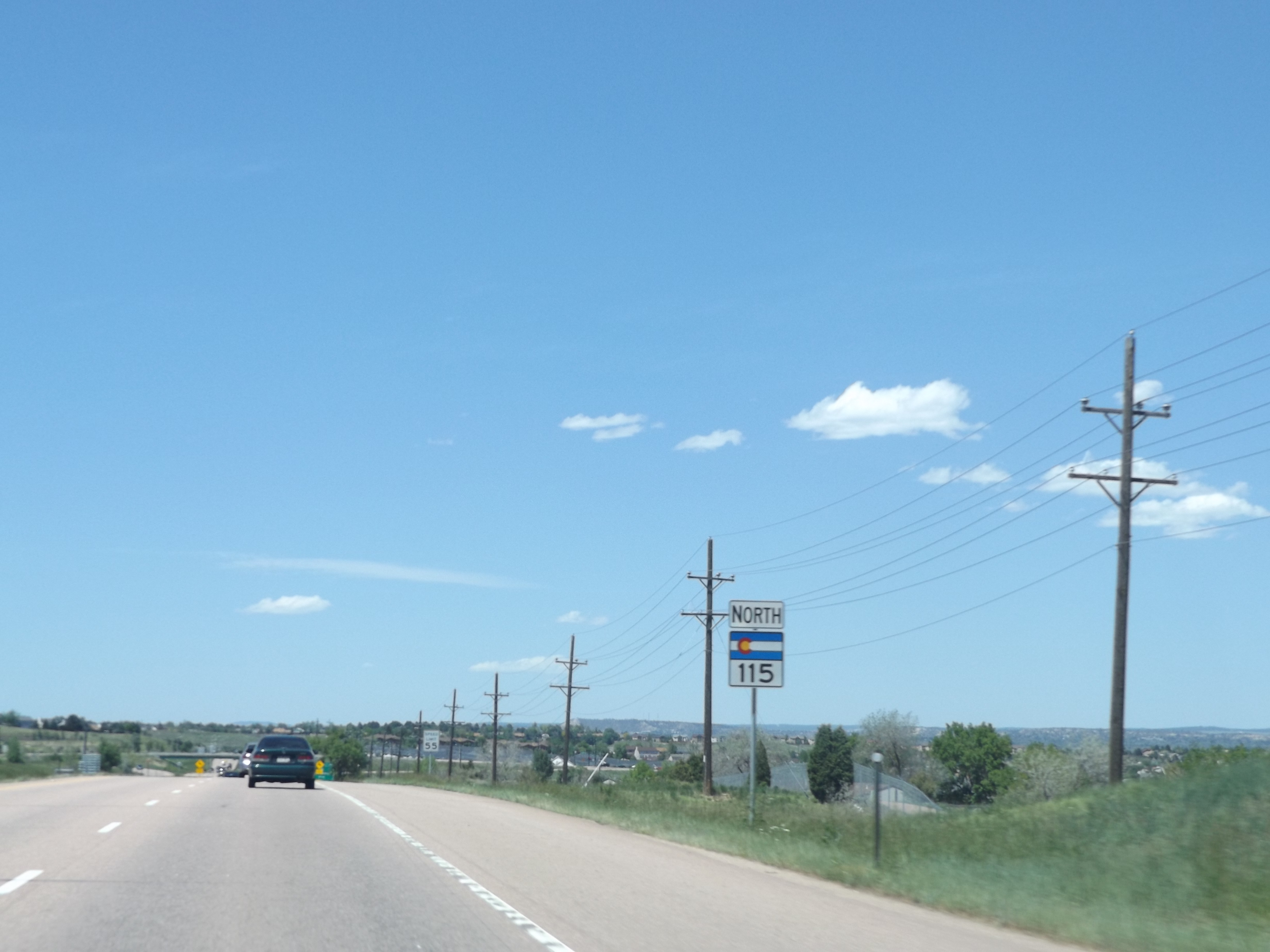
SH 115 northbound

Major construction has been done on the mountainous portion of the highway due to a high number of accidents because of lane narrowing. Highway 115 passes through several small towns along the eastern mountains including Florence and Penrose. It is the only highway that directly connects Colorado Springs to Cañon City. The Highway Starts in Downtown Cañon City at US 50. It then crosses the Arkansas River and leaves the city. In Florence, SH 115 Overlaps SH 67 from Pikes Peak Avenue to Robinson Avenue. As it leaves Florence, SH-115 encounters the western end of SH 120 and once again, crosses the Arkansas River. In Penrose, the route, once again, intersects US-50. SH 115 then becomes an expressway, with interchanges at O'Connell Boulevard, South Academy Boulevard, and Lake Avenue as it enters Colorado Springs. It ends at I-25 in Colorado Springs.

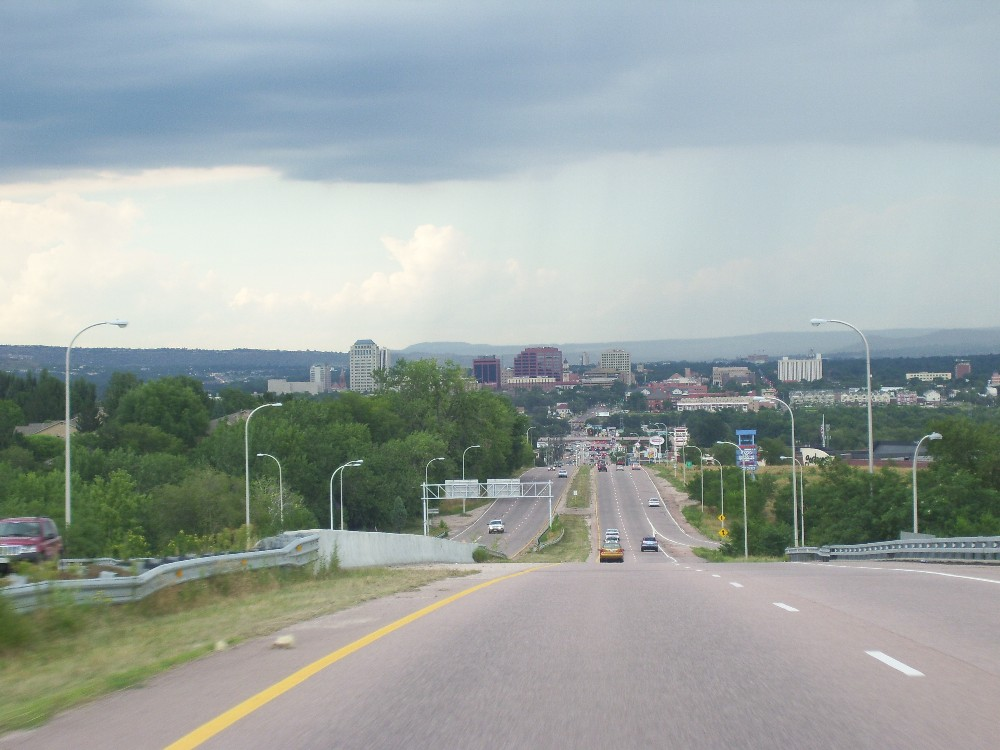
SH 115 looking north towards Colorado Springs

== History ==
The route was established in the 1920s, when it connected US 50 near Florence to Colorado Springs. By 1950, the west terminus was fixed to SH 120. The US 50 interchange was built by 1977, when the entire route was paved. A small change in the routing near its east end occurred in 2007.

=== Fire ===
On March 18, 2026, a fire was started on the East side on the highway in Fremont County. The next day the fire spread east onto Fort Carson land.It can be seen from Pueblo and Colorado Springs. The 24 Fire remains at 1,927 acres with 0 percent containment as of 7:30 a.m. All evacuation and pre-evacuation orders remain in effect, and Highway 115 remains closed from Rock Creek Canyon Road to mile marker 18, located three miles north of Penrose. This fire is believed to be human caused. As of March 23, 2026 the fire has grown to 6,400 acres. As of March 24, 2026, evacuations have been lifted to Pre-Evacuation warnings.

== Major intersections ==
County	Location	mi	km	Exit	Destinations	Notes
Fremont	Cañon City	0	0.0		US 50 – Salida, Pueblo	Southern terminus
Fremont	Florence	8.5	13.7		SH 67 north	Western end of SH 67 concurrency
Fremont	Florence	9	14		SH 67 south – Wetmore, Westcliffe	Eastern end of SH 67 concurrency
Fremont	Florence	11	18		SH 120 east	Western terminus of SH 120
Fremont	Penrose	14	23		US 50 – Cañon City, Pueblo	Interchange
El Paso	Colorado Springs	43	69	43	Norad Road / O'Connell Blvd	Cloverleaf interchange; signed as 43A (Ft Carson Gate 2) and 43B (Cheyenne Mtn AFS)
El Paso	Colorado Springs	44	71	44	S. Academy Blvd	Interchange
El Paso	Colorado Springs			–	Clubhouse Drive	Interchange; southbound exit only
El Paso	Colorado Springs	46	74	46	Lake Avenue	Interchange
El Paso	Colorado Springs	47	76		I-25 / US 24 / US 85 / US 87 – Pueblo, Denver	Northern terminus
El Paso	Colorado Springs	47	76		Nevada Avenue	Continuation past I-25
1.000 mi = 1.609 km; 1.000 km = 0.621 mi: Concurrency terminus; Incomplete access
