= Ponderosa Park, Colorado =

Census-designated place in Elbert County, CO, USA

- Census-designated place
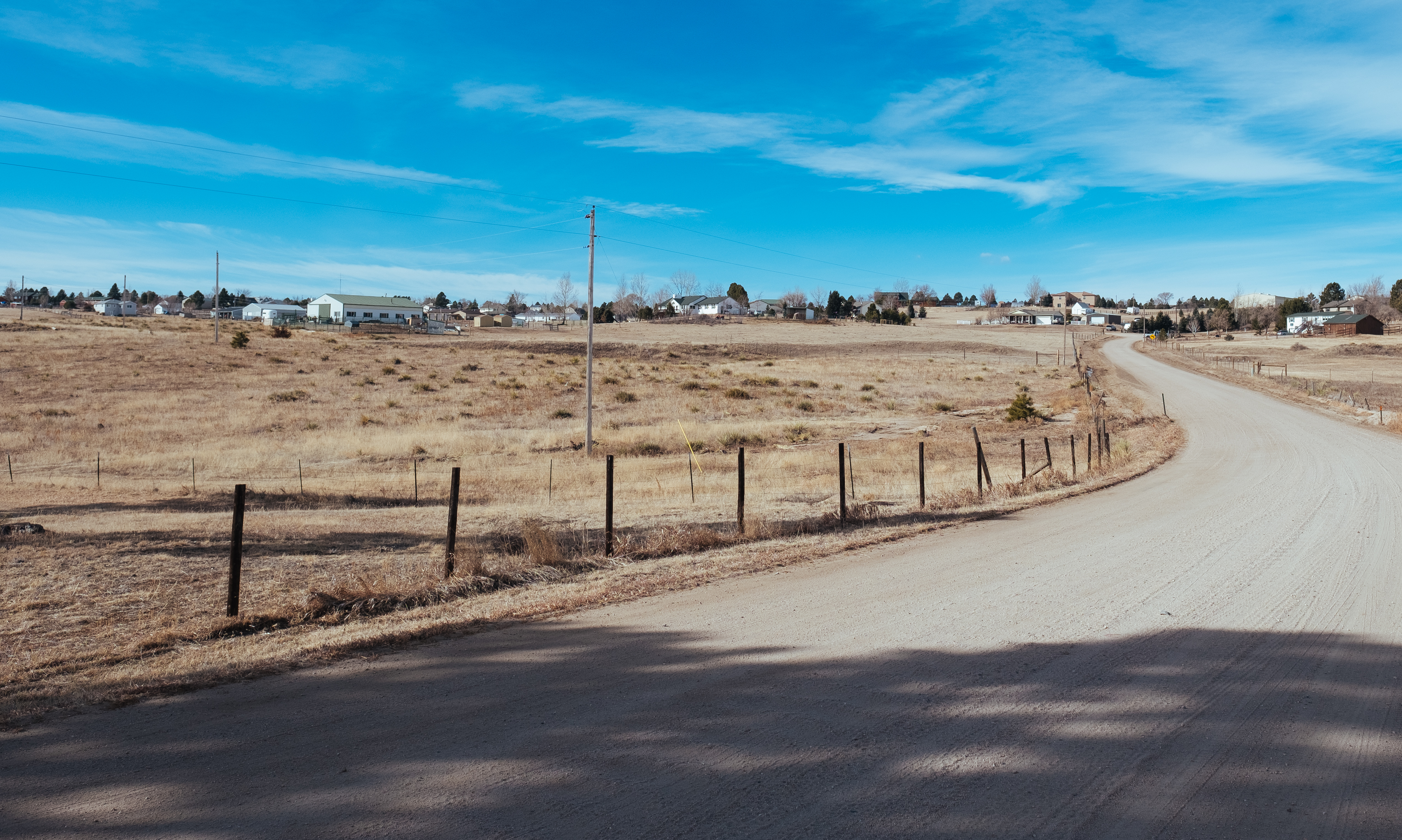
- Ponderosa Park, Colorado

- Location of the Ponderosa Park CDP in Elbert County, Colorado
- Coordinates: 39°23′55″N 104°38′08″W
- Country: United States
- State: Colorado
- County: Elbert County

Government
  - Type: unincorporated community

Area
  - Total: 14.583 sq mi (37.770 km^{2})
  - Land: 14.583 sq mi (37.770 km^{2})
  - Water: 0 sq mi (0.000 km^{2})
- Elevation: 6,683 ft (2,037 m)

Population (2020)
  - Total: 3,334
  - Density: 228.6/sq mi (88.27/km^{2})
- Time zone: UTC-7 (MST)
  - Summer (DST): UTC-6 (MDT)
- ZIP Code: Elizabeth 80107
- Area codes: 303 & 720
- GNIS feature ID: 2409088

Ponderosa Park is an unincorporated community and a census-designated place (CDP) located in and governed by Elbert County, Colorado, United States. The CDP is a part of the Denver–Aurora–Lakewood, CO Metropolitan Statistical Area. The population of the Ponderosa Park CDP was 3,334 at the United States Census 2020. Elbert County governs the unincorporated community. The Elizabeth post office (Zip Code 80107) serves the area.

== Geography ==
Ponderosa Park is located on the western border of Elbert County. It is bordered to the southeast by the town of Elizabeth. Colorado State Highway 86 forms the southern edge of the CDP, leading east 9 miles (14 km) to Kiowa, the county seat, and west 7 miles (11 km) to Franktown. Castle Rock is 13 miles (21 km) to the west, and Denver is 37 miles (60 km) to the northwest.

The Ponderosa Park CDP has an area of 9,333 acres (37.770 km^{2}), all land.

=== Climate ===
This climate type is usually found in the outskirts of true deserts in low-latitude, semiarid regions. It has a cooler, wetter winter resulting from the higher latitude and mid-latitude frontal cyclone activity. Annual precipitation totals are greater than in tropical and subtropical desert climates. Yearly variations in amount are not as extreme as in the true deserts but are nevertheless large. The Köppen Climate Classification subtype for this climate is "BSk". (Tropical and Subtropical Steppe Climate).

Climate data for Ponderosa Park, Colorado
Month	Jan	Feb	Mar	Apr	May	Jun	Jul	Aug	Sep	Oct	Nov	Dec	Year
Mean daily maximum °C (°F)	6 (43)	8 (46)	11 (51)	16 (60)	21 (69)	27 (80)	30 (86)	29 (84)	25 (77)	19 (66)	11 (52)	7 (45)	17 (63)
Mean daily minimum °C (°F)	−9 (15)	−8 (18)	−5 (23)	−1 (31)	4 (40)	9 (49)	13 (55)	12 (54)	8 (46)	2 (35)	−5 (23)	−8 (17)	1 (34)
Average precipitation mm (inches)	7.6 (0.3)	7.6 (0.3)	23 (0.9)	33 (1.3)	64 (2.5)	48 (1.9)	56 (2.2)	48 (1.9)	28 (1.1)	20 (0.8)	18 (0.7)	7.6 (0.3)	360 (14.1)
Source: Weatherbase

== Demographics ==
The United States Census Bureau initially defined the Ponderosa Park CDP for the 1980 United States census.

Ponderosa Park CDP, Colorado
Year	Pop.	±%
1990	1,640	—
2000	3,112	+89.8%
2010	3,232	+3.9%
2020	3,334	+3.2%
Source: United States Census Bureau

=== 2020 census ===
As of the 2020 census, Ponderosa Park had a population of 3,334. The median age was 49.4 years. 20.2% of residents were under the age of 18 and 18.9% of residents were 65 years of age or older. For every 100 females there were 95.8 males, and for every 100 females age 18 and over there were 94.5 males age 18 and over.

0.0% of residents lived in urban areas, while 100.0% lived in rural areas.

There were 1,201 households in Ponderosa Park, of which 29.5% had children under the age of 18 living in them. Of all households, 73.1% were married-couple households, 11.0% were households with a male householder and no spouse or partner present, and 12.7% were households with a female householder and no spouse or partner present. About 12.3% of all households were made up of individuals and 6.1% had someone living alone who was 65 years of age or older.

There were 1,228 housing units, of which 2.2% were vacant. The homeowner vacancy rate was 1.1% and the rental vacancy rate was 6.4%.

Racial composition as of the 2020 census
Race	Number	Percent
White	2,963	88.9%
Black or African American	13	0.4%
American Indian and Alaska Native	10	0.3%
Asian	28	0.8%
Native Hawaiian and Other Pacific Islander	0	0.0%
Some other race	79	2.4%
Two or more races	241	7.2%
Hispanic or Latino (of any race)	247	7.4%

== Education ==
It is in the Elizabeth School District.

== See also ==
- Colorado census-designated places
