= Fondis, Colorado =

Ghost town in Elbert County, Colorado, United States

- ghost town
- Location of Fondis, Colorado. Fondis (Colorado)
- Coordinates: 39°12′57″N 104°20′50″W
- Country: United States
- State: Colorado
- County: Elbert
- Elevation: 6,175 ft (1,882 m)
- Time zone: UTC−07:00 (MST)
  - Summer (DST): UTC−06:00 (MDT)
- ZIP code: Elbert 80106
- Area codes: 303/720/983
- GNIS place ID: 193211

Fondis is a ghost town located in Elbert County, Colorado, United States. Fondis is a part of the Denver-Aurora-Centennial, CO Metropolitan Statistical Area.

== History ==
The Fondis, Colorado, post office operated from November 25, 1895, until July 15, 1954. Ella Cox was the town's first postmaster. The Elbert, Colorado, post office (ZIP code 80106) now serves the area. One historical account states that the unincorporated town derived its name from Fondi, in Italy, while other accounts state that it is named for an Italian Hotel, the Fondide Italia. Around the turn of the twentieth century, the town had a population of 40 people and boasted several stores, including Harper's General Store operated by George Conarroe, two blacksmith shops and the Fondis Hotel, owned and operated by Will Conarroe. He also operated a cheese factory that turned out 250 pounds of cheese per day. For 10 weeks in 1902, Fred A. Coan operated the Fondis Herald newspaper.

== See also ==
- Front Range Urban Corridor
- List of populated places in Colorado
