= Elizabeth, Colorado =

Statutory town in Elbert County, Colorado, United States

- Statutory town
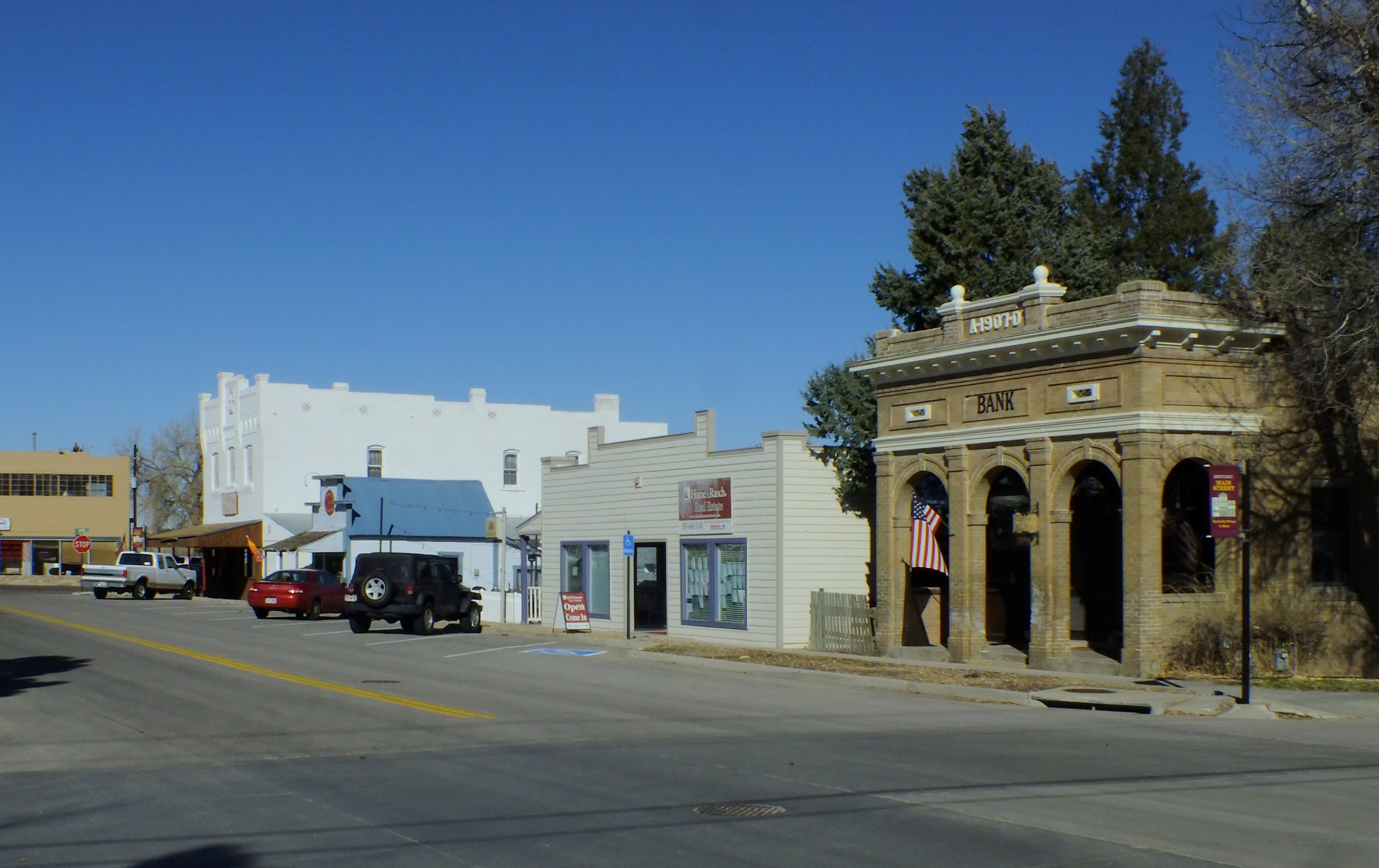
- Old Town Elizabeth, Colorado

- Location of the Town of Elizabeth in Elbert County, Colorado
- Coordinates: 39°21′29″N 104°37′25″W
- Country: United States
- State: Colorado
- County: Elbert
- Incorporated: October 9, 1890

Government
  - Type: Statutory town

Area
  - Total: 1.999 sq mi (5.178 km^{2})
  - Land: 1.999 sq mi (5.178 km^{2})
  - Water: 0 sq mi (0.000 km^{2})
- Elevation: 6,477 ft (1,974 m)

Population (2020)
  - Total: 1,675
  - Density: 838/sq mi (324/km^{2})
- Time zone: UTC−07:00 (MST)
  - Summer (DST): UTC−06:00 (MDT)
- ZIP code: 80107
- Area codes: 303/720/983
- GNIS town ID: 2412474
- FIPS code: 08 23740
- Website: www.townofelizabeth.org

Elizabeth is the statutory town that is the most populous municipality in Elbert County, Colorado, United States. The town population was 1,675 at the 2020 United States census, a +23.34% increase since the 2010 United States census. Elizabeth is a part of the Denver-Aurora-Centennial, CO Metropolitan Statistical Area and the Front Range Urban Corridor.

== History ==
Elizabeth was originally a saw mill camp. The town was later named after a family member of John Evans, a territorial governor. The Elizabeth, Colorado, post office opened on April 24, 1882, and the Town of Elizabeth was incorporated on October 9, 1890.

In August 2024, the Elizabeth School District’s School Board removed 19 books from school libraries because they included what the Board deemed to be ‘sensitive’ topics. Students, parents and authors sued the Elizabeth School District in federal court, and in March 2025 they won a preliminary injunction requiring that all 19 of the removed books be immediately returned to the browsing shelves of school libraries and prohibiting the Elizabeth School Board from removing any other library books due to its disagreement with the content and/or viewpoint of those books.

== Geography ==
Elizabeth is located in western Elbert County.

At the 2020 United States census, the town had a total area of 1,280 acres (5.178 km^{2}), all of it land.

== Demographics ==
Historical population
Census	Pop.	Note	%±
1900	215		—
1910	194		−9.8%
1920	230		18.6%
1930	266		15.7%
1940	275		3.4%
1950	263		−4.4%
1960	326		24.0%
1970	493		51.2%
1980	789		60.0%
1990	818		3.7%
2000	1,434		75.3%
2010	1,358		−5.3%
2020	1,675		23.3%
U.S. Decennial Census

=== 2020 census ===
As of the 2020 census, Elizabeth had a population of 1,675. The median age was 33.8 years. 29.4% of residents were under the age of 18 and 9.7% of residents were 65 years of age or older. For every 100 females there were 95.4 males, and for every 100 females age 18 and over there were 91.1 males age 18 and over.

0.0% of residents lived in urban areas, while 100.0% lived in rural areas.

There were 600 households in Elizabeth, of which 43.8% had children under the age of 18 living in them. Of all households, 50.8% were married-couple households, 18.2% were households with a male householder and no spouse or partner present, and 25.2% were households with a female householder and no spouse or partner present. About 22.7% of all households were made up of individuals and 7.9% had someone living alone who was 65 years of age or older.

There were 621 housing units, of which 3.4% were vacant. The homeowner vacancy rate was 2.4% and the rental vacancy rate was 0.0%.

Racial composition as of the 2020 census
Race	Number	Percent
White	1,441	86.0%
Black or African American	4	0.2%
American Indian and Alaska Native	17	1.0%
Asian	10	0.6%
Native Hawaiian and Other Pacific Islander	1	0.1%
Some other race	39	2.3%
Two or more races	163	9.7%
Hispanic or Latino (of any race)	184	11.0%

=== 2000 census ===
As of the census of 2000, there were 1,434 people, 496 households, and 380 families residing in the town. The population density was 1,670.6 inhabitants per square mile (645.0/km^{2}). There were 513 housing units at an average density of 597.6 per square mile (230.7/km^{2}). The racial makeup of the town was 94.00% White, 0.07% African American, 0.84% Native American, 0.21% Asian, 3.49% from other races, and 1.39% from two or more races. Hispanic or Latino of any race were 6.00% of the population.

There were 496 households, out of which 47.2% had children under the age of 18 living with them, 60.3% were married couples living together, 11.7% had a female householder with no husband present, and 23.2% were non-families. 16.9% of all households were made up of individuals, and 4.0% had someone living alone who was 65 years of age or older. The average household size was 2.89 and the average family size was 3.27.

The population breakdown was 33.3% under the age of 18, 9.7% from 18 to 24, 36.5% from 25 to 44, 16.4% from 45 to 64, and 4.2% who were 65 years of age or older. The median age was 30 years. For every 100 females, there were 105.4 males. For every 100 females age 18 and over, there were 99.8 males.

The median income for a household in the town was $49,596, and the median income for a family was $51,902. Males had a median income of $38,875 versus $25,066 for females. The per capita income for the town was $18,902. About 7.8% of families and 9.2% of the population were below the poverty line, including 11.8% of those under age 18 and 9.5% of those age 65 or over.

== Media ==
Elizabeth is home to the weekly newspaper the Meadowlark Herald, which is also the only newspaper wholly owned and published in Elbert County. The Elbert County News, The Ranchland News, The West Elbert County Sun, and The Prairie Times also publish Elbert County news and distribute widely in the county.

Elizabeth is also the hometown of author and stand-up comedian Sam Tallent.

== Infrastructure and transport ==
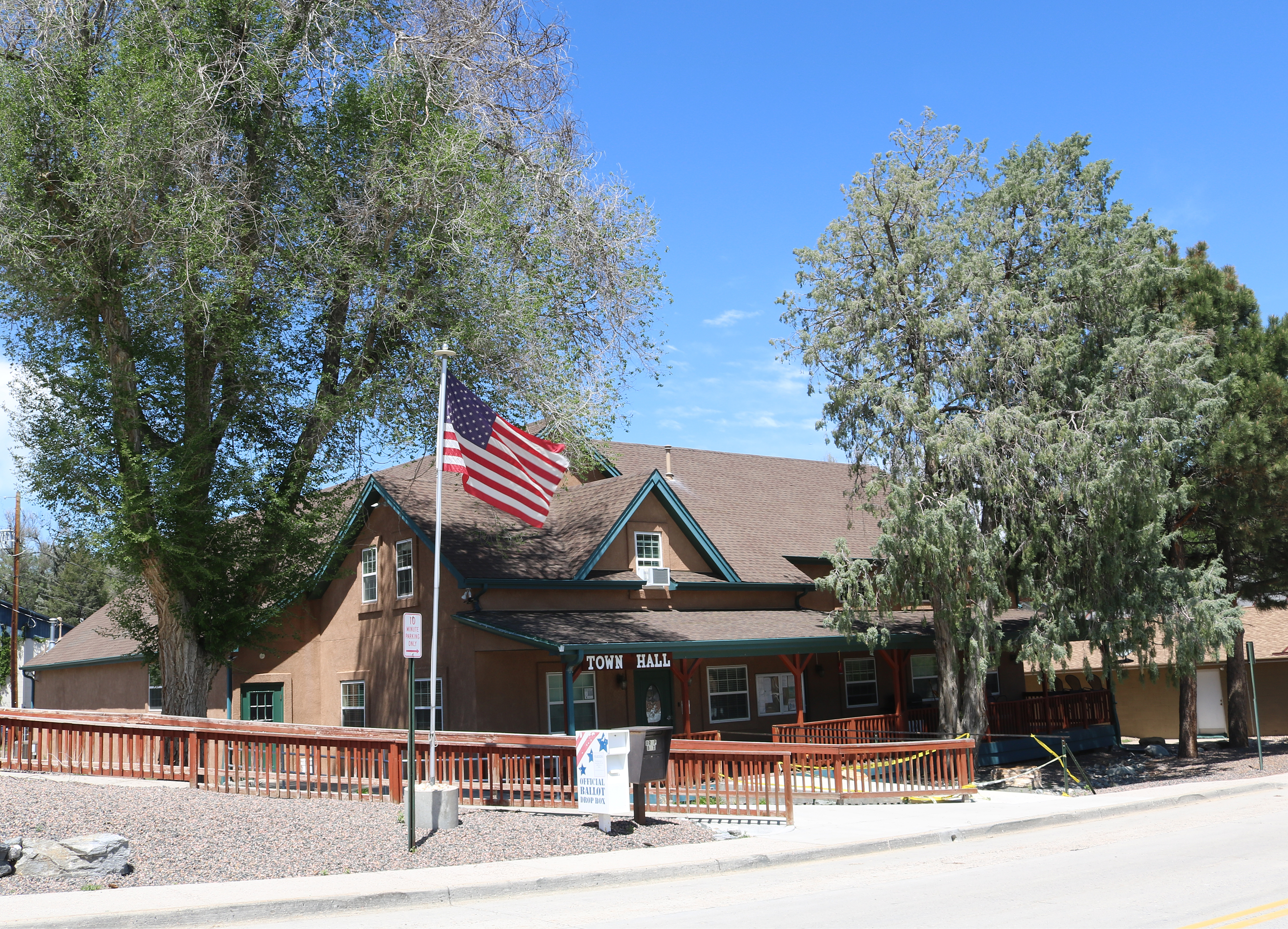
Elizabeth Town Hall

Colorado State Highway 86 bisects the town, leading east 7 miles (11 km) to Kiowa and west 15 miles (24 km) to Castle Rock. Denver is 40 miles (64 km) to the northwest via Franktown and Parker. The town lays in between the Gold Creek and Box Elder Creek (locally known as the Running Creek). No public transport exists in Elizabeth.

A group of three separate unmarked turf airstrips exist to Elizabeth's southeast, though has no commercial service. Elizabeth is located equidistantly to Denver and Colorado Springs, with both cities' primary airports, Denver International Airport and Colorado Springs Airport, serving as the closest major air gateways to Elizabeth.

== Education ==
It is in the Elizabeth School District.

== Notable people ==
- Greg Lopez, former U.S. representative and mayor of Parker
- John C. Malone, American businessman and philanthropist
- Sam Tallent, Comedian/Author

== See also ==
- Front Range Urban Corridor
- List of municipalities in Colorado
