= St. Mark United Presbyterian Church =

Historic church in Colorado, United States

- U.S. National Register of Historic Places
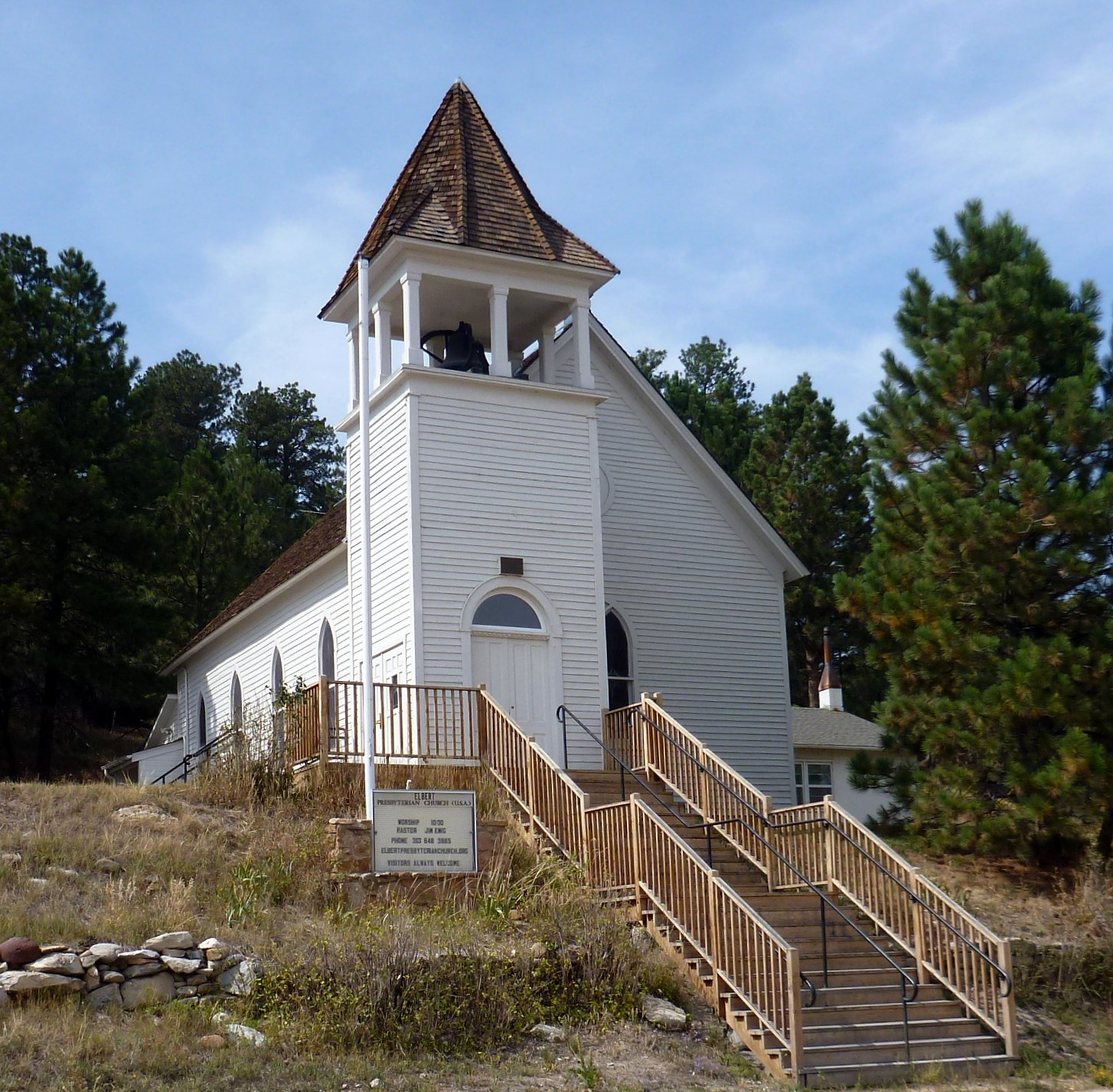

- Location within Colorado Location within the United States
- Location: 225 Main St., Elbert, Colorado
- Coordinates: 39°13′13″N 104°32′14″W
- Area: less than one acre
- Built: 1889
- Architect: Green, Taylor
- NRHP reference No.: 80000899
- Added to NRHP: September 18, 1980

St. Mark United Presbyterian Church is a historic church at 225 Main Street in Elbert, Colorado. It was built in 1889 and was added to the National Register of Historic Places in 1980.

It is a one-and-a-half-story building with a high gable roof. It has a church tower with a four-sided cupola. Its donated land is on a hillside, and the church is approached by a staircase.
