= Elbert, Colorado =

Census-designated place in Elbert County, Colorado, United States

- Census-designated place
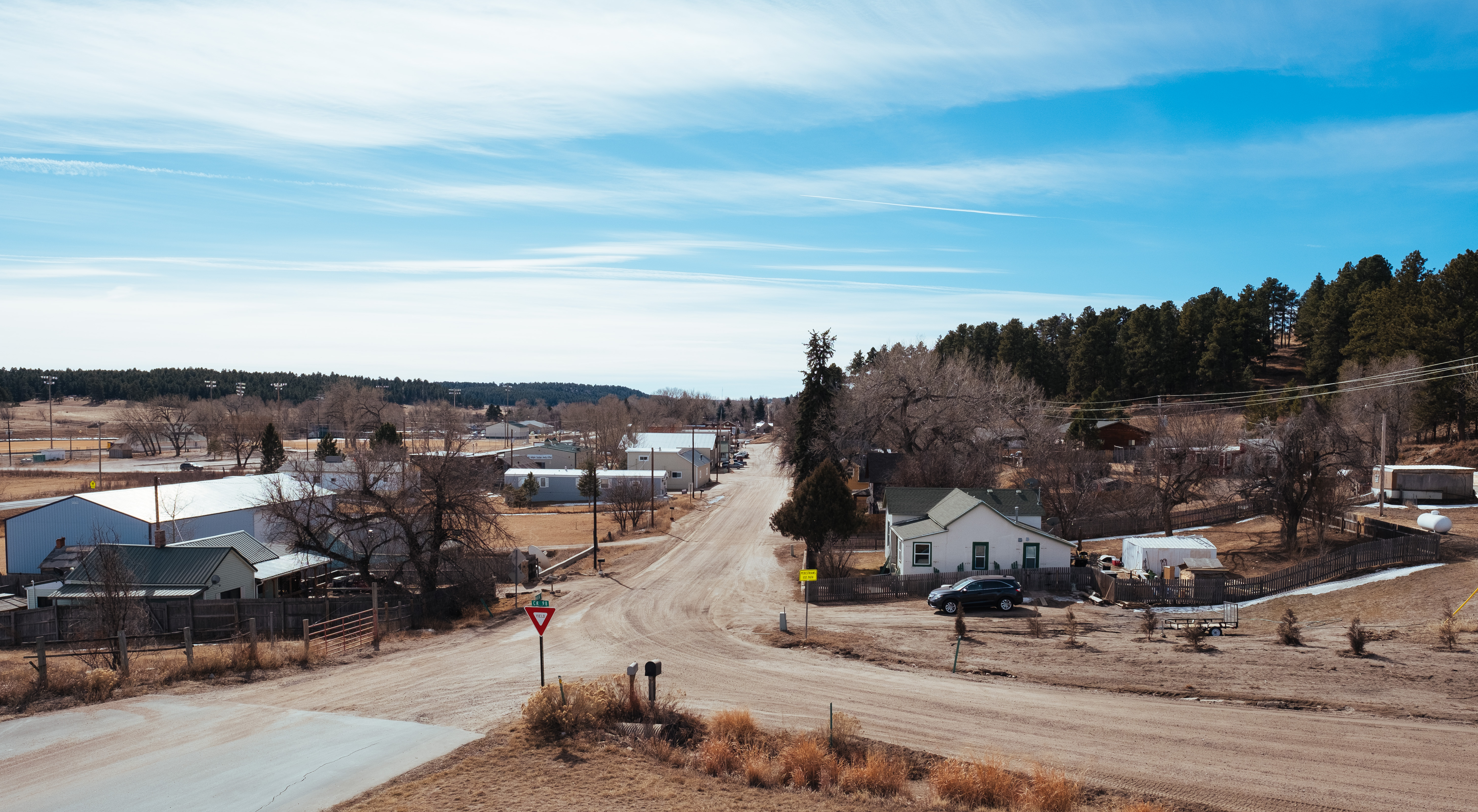
- Elbert, Colorado.

- Location of the Elbert CDP in Elbert County, Colorado.
- Coordinates: 39°13′08″N 104°32′26″W
- Country: United States
- State: Colorado
- County: Elbert

Government
  - Type: Unincorporated community
  - Body: Elbert County

Area
  - Total: 0.474 sq mi (1.227 km^{2})
  - Land: 0.474 sq mi (1.227 km^{2})
  - Water: 0 sq mi (0.000 km^{2})
- Elevation: 6,723 ft (2,049 m)

Population (2020)
  - Total: 188
  - Density: 397/sq mi (153/km^{2})
- Time zone: UTC−07:00 (MST)
  - Summer (DST): UTC−06:00 (MDT)
- ZIP code: 80106
- Area codes: 303/720/983
- GNIS CDP ID: 2629986
- FIPS code: 08-23520

Elbert is an unincorporated town, a post office, and a census-designated place (CDP) located in and governed by Elbert County, Colorado, United States. The CDP is a part of the Denver–Aurora–Lakewood, CO Metropolitan Statistical Area. The Elbert post office has the ZIP Code 80106. At the United States Census 2020, the population of the Elbert CDP was 188.

== History ==
The Elbert, Colorado Territory, post office opened on March 12, 1875. The community takes its name from Elbert County.

The most significant flood events in Elbert County occurred in 1935, 1965, 1997, and 1999. The most damaging flood was in 1935, when flooding on Kiowa Creek destroyed three-fourths of the structures location in Elbert and resulted in nine deaths, seven of them in Elbert. All bridges were lost, 59 buildings were destroyed, water was 8 to 15 feet (2.4 to 4.6 m) deep, and there were 5 feet (1.5 m) of sand. Three-fourths of the town of Elbert was destroyed and not rebuilt.

On 11 January 1998 a fireball was seen over Elbert County. On 4 March 2000 a stone of 680.5 g was found in a field by the-five-year old Dustin Riffel on the property of his family. It was officially named "Elbert" and it was classified as an ordinary chondrite LL6.

On June 15, 2009, at 1:46 p.m., a large three-quarter mile-wide, EF2 tornado touched down in rural fields west of the town. The tornado came within 2 miles (3 km) of the town at its closest. The tornado destroyed a barn at a farm and damaged an airplane hangar.

== Today ==
Elbert today is a small community with ranches and farms. The Elbert School was rebuilt.

== Geography ==
Elbert is located in the valley of Kiowa Creek. Elbert Road leads north 10 miles (16 km) to Kiowa and south 11 miles (18 km) to Eastonville. Colorado Springs is 37 miles (60 km) to the southwest via Elbert Road and U.S. Route 24.

During the summer, Elbert is much busier due to a nearby Boy Scout camp, Peaceful Valley Scout Ranch, which has 10,000 visitors annually. 2.8 miles (4.5 km) south of Elbert lies the JCC Ranch Camp, a Jewish camp owned by the Denver Jewish Community Center.

The Elbert CDP has an area of 303 acres (1.227 km^{2}), all land.

== Demographics ==
The United States Census Bureau initially defined the Elbert CDP for the United States Census 2010.

Elbert CDP, Colorado
| Year | Pop. | ±% |
|---|---|---|
| 2010 | 230 | — |
| 2020 | 188 | −18.3% |
Source: United States Census Bureau

== Transportation ==
Elbert lies along Elbert Road, which connects the town of Kiowa to U.S. Highway 24. The largest nearby city is Castle Rock, which is about 45 minutes away via SH 86, which Elbert Road crosses at Kiowa. Colorado Springs is an hour drive via US 24.

== Education ==
It is in the Elbert School District 200.

== See also ==
- Front Range Urban Corridor
- List of census-designated places in Colorado
