= Elbert County, Colorado =

County in the United States

- County
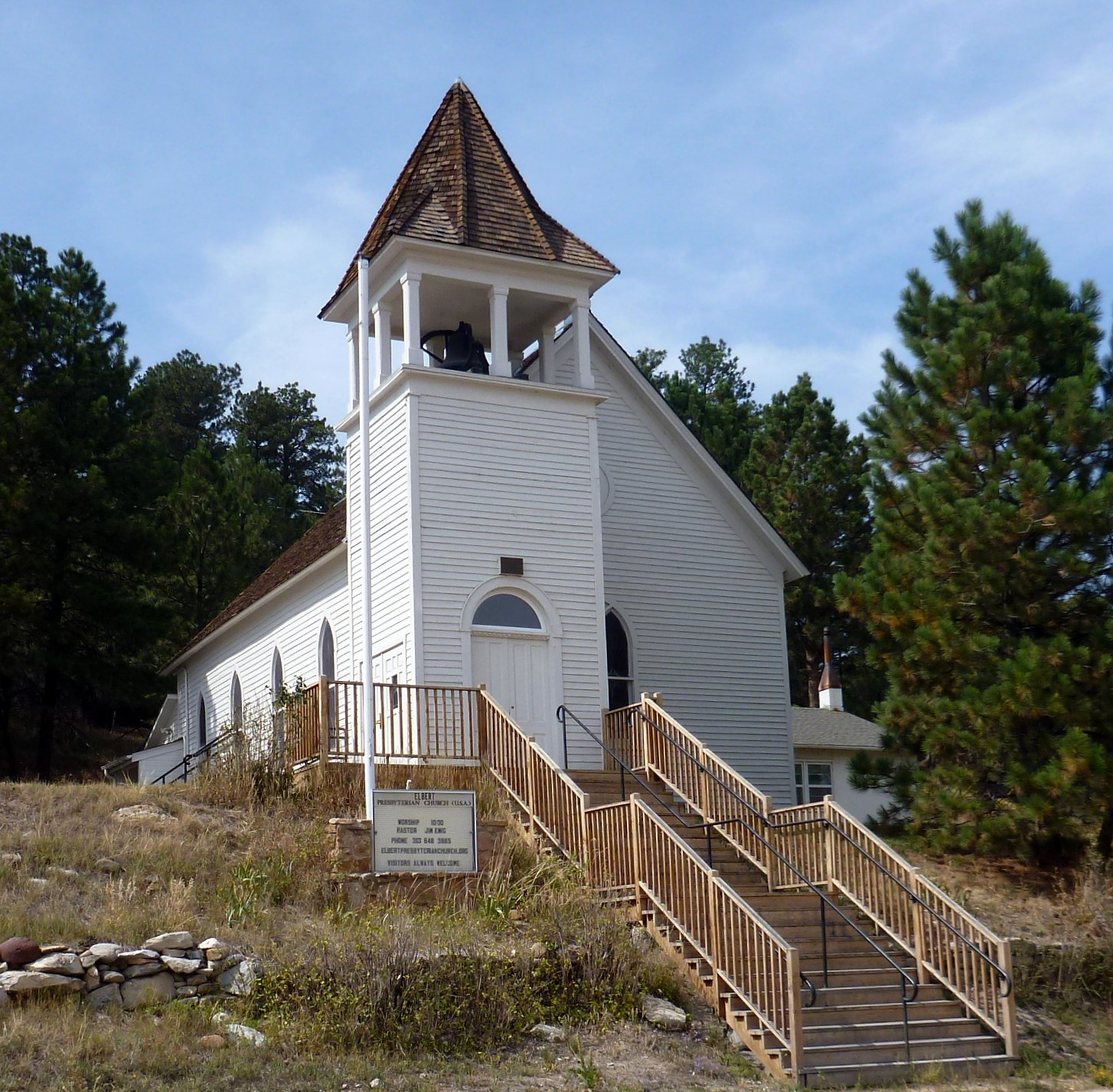
- St. Mark United Presbyterian Church, Elbert, Colorado.

- Location within the U.S. state of Colorado
- Coordinates: 39.17°N 104.08°W
- Country: United States
- State: Colorado
- Founded: February 2, 1874
- Named for: Samuel Hitt Elbert
- Seat: Kiowa
- Largest community: Ponderosa Park

Area
  - Total: 1,851 sq mi (4,790 km^{2})
  - Land: 1,851 sq mi (4,790 km^{2})
  - Water: 0.2 sq mi (0.52 km^{2}) 0.01%

Population (2020)
  - Total: 26,062
  - Estimate (2025): 30,534 ▲
  - Density: 14.08/sq mi (5.436/km^{2})
- Time zone: UTC−7 (Mountain)
  - Summer (DST): UTC−6 (MDT)
- Congressional district: 4th
- Website: www.elbertcounty-co.gov

Elbert County is a county located in the U.S. state of Colorado. As of the 2020 census, the population was 26,062. The county seat is Kiowa and the largest town is Elizabeth. Elbert County is included in the Denver-Aurora-Lakewood, CO Metropolitan Statistical Area.

== History ==
Elbert County was created on February 2, 1874, from the eastern portions of Douglas County. On February 6, 1874, the county was enlarged to include part of northern Greenwood County upon Greenwood's dissolution, and originally extended south and east of its present boundaries to reach to the Kansas state line. The county was named for Samuel Hitt Elbert, the Governor of the Territory of Colorado when the county was formed. In 1889, Elbert County was reduced to its modern size when its eastern portions were taken to create Lincoln, Kit Carson, and Cheyenne counties.

== Geography ==
According to the U.S. Census Bureau, the county has a total area of 1,851 square miles (4,790 km^{2}), of which 1,851 square miles (4,790 km^{2}) is land and 0.2 square miles (0.52 km^{2}) (0.01%) is water.

=== Adjacent counties ===
- Arapahoe County - north
- Lincoln County - east
- El Paso County - south
- Douglas County - west

=== Major highways ===
- I-70
- US 24
- US 40
- US 287
- SH 86
- CR 49 / CR 53 (Kiowa-Bennett Road)

== Demographics ==
Historical population
Census	Pop.	Note	%±
1880	1,708		—
1890	1,856		8.7%
1900	3,101		67.1%
1910	5,331		71.9%
1920	6,980		30.9%
1930	6,580		−5.7%
1940	5,460		−17.0%
1950	4,477		−18.0%
1960	3,708		−17.2%
1970	3,903		5.3%
1980	6,850		75.5%
1990	9,646		40.8%
2000	19,872		106.0%
2010	23,086		16.2%
2020	26,062		12.9%
2025 (est.)	30,534	▲	17.2%
U.S. Decennial Census; 1790-1960 1900-1990; 1990-2000 2010-2020

=== 2020 census ===
As of the 2020 census, the county had a population of 26,062. Of the residents, 21.7% were under the age of 18 and 17.8% were 65 years of age or older; the median age was 45.9 years. For every 100 females there were 101.0 males, and for every 100 females age 18 and over there were 100.4 males. 0.0% of residents lived in urban areas and 100.0% lived in rural areas.

Elbert County, Colorado – Racial and ethnic composition Note: the US Census treats Hispanic/Latino as an ethnic category. This table excludes Latinos from the racial categories and assigns them to a separate category. Hispanics/Latinos may be of any race.
Race / Ethnicity (NH = Non-Hispanic)	Pop 2000	Pop 2010	Pop 2020	% 2000	% 2010	% 2020
White alone (NH)	18,511	21,005	22,185	93.15%	90.99%	85.12%
Black or African American alone (NH)	123	159	123	0.62%	0.69%	0.47%
Native American or Alaska Native alone (NH)	99	126	116	0.50%	0.55%	0.45%
Asian alone (NH)	70	165	184	0.35%	0.71%	0.71%
Pacific Islander alone (NH)	16	22	21	0.08%	0.10%	0.08%
Other race alone (NH)	17	17	123	0.09%	0.07%	0.47%
Mixed race or Multiracial (NH)	270	358	1,243	1.36%	1.55%	4.77%
Hispanic or Latino (any race)	766	1,234	2,067	3.85%	5.35%	7.93%
Total	19,872	23,086	26,062	100.00%	100.00%	100.00%

The racial makeup of the county was 87.5% White, 0.5% Black or African American, 0.7% American Indian and Alaska Native, 0.7% Asian, 0.1% Native Hawaiian and Pacific Islander, 2.2% from some other race, and 8.3% from two or more races. Hispanic or Latino residents of any race comprised 7.9% of the population.

There were 9,376 households in the county, of which 31.7% had children under the age of 18 living with them and 13.5% had a female householder with no spouse or partner present. About 15.2% of all households were made up of individuals and 6.7% had someone living alone who was 65 years of age or older.

There were 9,805 housing units, of which 4.4% were vacant. Among occupied housing units, 91.1% were owner-occupied and 8.9% were renter-occupied. The homeowner vacancy rate was 0.8% and the rental vacancy rate was 8.7%.

=== 2000 census ===
At the 2000 census there were 19,872 people, 6,770 households, and 5,652 families in the county. The population density was 11 people per square mile (4.2 people/km^{2}). There were 7,113 housing units at an average density of 4 per square mile (1.5/km^{2}). The racial makeup of the county was 95.22% White, 0.64% Black or African American, 0.63% Native American, 0.37% Asian, 0.09% Pacific Islander, 1.28% from other races, and 1.76% from two or more races. 3.85% of the population were Hispanic or Latino of any race. Of the 6,770 households 42.80% had children under the age of 18 living with them, 75.10% were married couples living together, 5.70% had a female householder with no husband present, and 16.50% were non-families. 12.20% of households were one person and 3.10% were one person aged 65 or older. The average household size was 2.93 and the average family size was 3.19.

The age distribution was 30.20% under the age of 18, 5.50% from 18 to 24, 32.80% from 25 to 44, 25.50% from 45 to 64, and 6.00% 65 or older. The median age was 37 years. For every 100 females there were 100.60 males. For every 100 females age 18 and over, there were 99.90 males.

The median household income was $62,480 and the median family income was $66,740. Males had a median income of $45,329 versus $29,767 for females. The per capita income for the county was $24,960. About 2.50% of families and 4.00% of the population were below the poverty line, including 4.60% of those under age 18 and 4.50% of those age 65 or over.

== Communities ==
=== Towns ===
- Elizabeth
- Kiowa
- Simla

=== Census-designated places ===
- Elbert
- Matheson
- Ponderosa Park

=== Other unincorporated places ===
- Agate
- Fondis

== Politics ==
Elbert is a strongly Republican county in Presidential elections. Along with Rio Blanco County and Kit Carson County, it was one of three Colorado counties to be won by Alf Landon in 1936, and stood together with Hinsdale and Washington Counties by supporting Barry Goldwater over Lyndon Johnson in 1964. The last Democratic presidential nominee to carry Elbert County was Franklin Delano Roosevelt in 1932.

United States presidential election results for Elbert County, Colorado
Year	Republican		Democratic		Third party(ies)	
Year	No.	%	No.	%	No.	%
1880	176	46.68%	195	51.72%	6	1.59%
1884	227	54.31%	190	45.45%	1	0.24%
1888	784	56.89%	578	41.94%	16	1.16%
1892	189	45.22%	0	0.00%	229	54.78%
1896	274	26.52%	751	72.70%	8	0.77%
1900	626	48.23%	640	49.31%	32	2.47%
1904	768	59.40%	482	37.28%	43	3.33%
1908	973	52.34%	785	42.23%	101	5.43%
1912	496	24.22%	757	36.96%	795	38.82%
1916	951	41.37%	1,230	53.50%	118	5.13%
1920	1,654	66.35%	673	27.00%	166	6.66%
1924	1,428	54.97%	506	19.48%	664	25.56%
1928	1,933	71.38%	738	27.25%	37	1.37%
1932	1,277	41.54%	1,649	53.64%	148	4.81%
1936	1,374	49.50%	1,319	47.51%	83	2.99%
1940	1,756	65.04%	934	34.59%	10	0.37%
1944	1,413	69.13%	628	30.72%	3	0.15%
1948	1,155	56.37%	873	42.61%	21	1.02%
1952	1,579	72.56%	586	26.93%	11	0.51%
1956	1,295	64.75%	702	35.10%	3	0.15%
1960	1,240	64.32%	686	35.58%	2	0.10%
1964	924	51.76%	857	48.01%	4	0.22%
1968	1,043	60.92%	484	28.27%	185	10.81%
1972	1,416	73.29%	451	23.34%	65	3.36%
1976	1,279	52.72%	1,068	44.02%	79	3.26%
1980	2,107	67.49%	698	22.36%	317	10.15%
1984	2,605	75.27%	802	23.17%	54	1.56%
1988	2,805	63.06%	1,566	35.21%	77	1.73%
1992	2,205	43.71%	1,237	24.52%	1,603	31.77%
1996	4,125	61.04%	1,894	28.03%	739	10.94%
2000	6,151	68.61%	2,326	25.95%	488	5.44%
2004	8,389	73.82%	2,834	24.94%	141	1.24%
2008	9,108	68.97%	3,819	28.92%	279	2.11%
2012	10,266	72.41%	3,603	25.41%	309	2.18%
2016	11,705	73.25%	3,134	19.61%	1,141	7.14%
2020	14,027	73.89%	4,490	23.65%	466	2.45%
2024	15,209	74.47%	4,768	23.35%	445	2.18%

United States Senate election results for Elbert County, Colorado2
Year	Republican		Democratic		Third party(ies)	
Year	No.	%	No.	%	No.	%
2020	14,340	75.64%	4,257	22.46%	360	1.90%

United States Senate election results for Elbert County, Colorado3
Year	Republican		Democratic		Third party(ies)	
Year	No.	%	No.	%	No.	%
2022	11,897	73.19%	3,824	23.53%	533	3.28%

Colorado Gubernatorial election results for Elbert County
Year	Republican		Democratic		Third party(ies)	
Year	No.	%	No.	%	No.	%
2022	11,618	71.38%	4,118	25.30%	541	3.32%

Elbert County is in the 4th Congressional District and the current representative is Republican Lauren Boebert.

In senatorial elections, the county has been similarly Republican. In gubernatorial elections, Elbert County has also generally been powerfully Republican, but was nonetheless carried by Democrat Roy Romer by a narrow margin in 1990 – when he carried all but four counties statewide – by Dick Lamm in 1982 and by Constitution Party candidate Tom Tancredo in 2010.

The official newspaper of record used by the county is the weekly Elbert County News. The weekly Ranchland News and monthly Prairie Times also cover local events.

== Education ==
School districts covering sections of the county include:

- Agate School District 300
- Big Sandy School District 100J
- Calhan School District RJ-1
- Douglas County School District RE-1
- Elbert School District 200
- Elizabeth School District
- Kiowa School District C-2
- Limon School District RE-4J
- Miami-Yoder School District 60-JT
- Peyton School District 23-JT

== See also ==
- Bibliography of Colorado
- Geography of Colorado
- History of Colorado
  - Arapahoe County, Kansas Territory
  - Arrappahoe County, Jefferson Territory
  - Arapahoe County, Colorado Territory
  - Greenwood County, Colorado Territory
  - National Register of Historic Places listings in Elbert County, Colorado
- Index of Colorado-related articles
- List of Colorado-related lists
  - List of counties in Colorado
  - List of statistical areas in Colorado
- Outline of Colorado
  - Front Range Urban Corridor
