= Box Elder Creek (Colorado) =

River in Colorado, United States

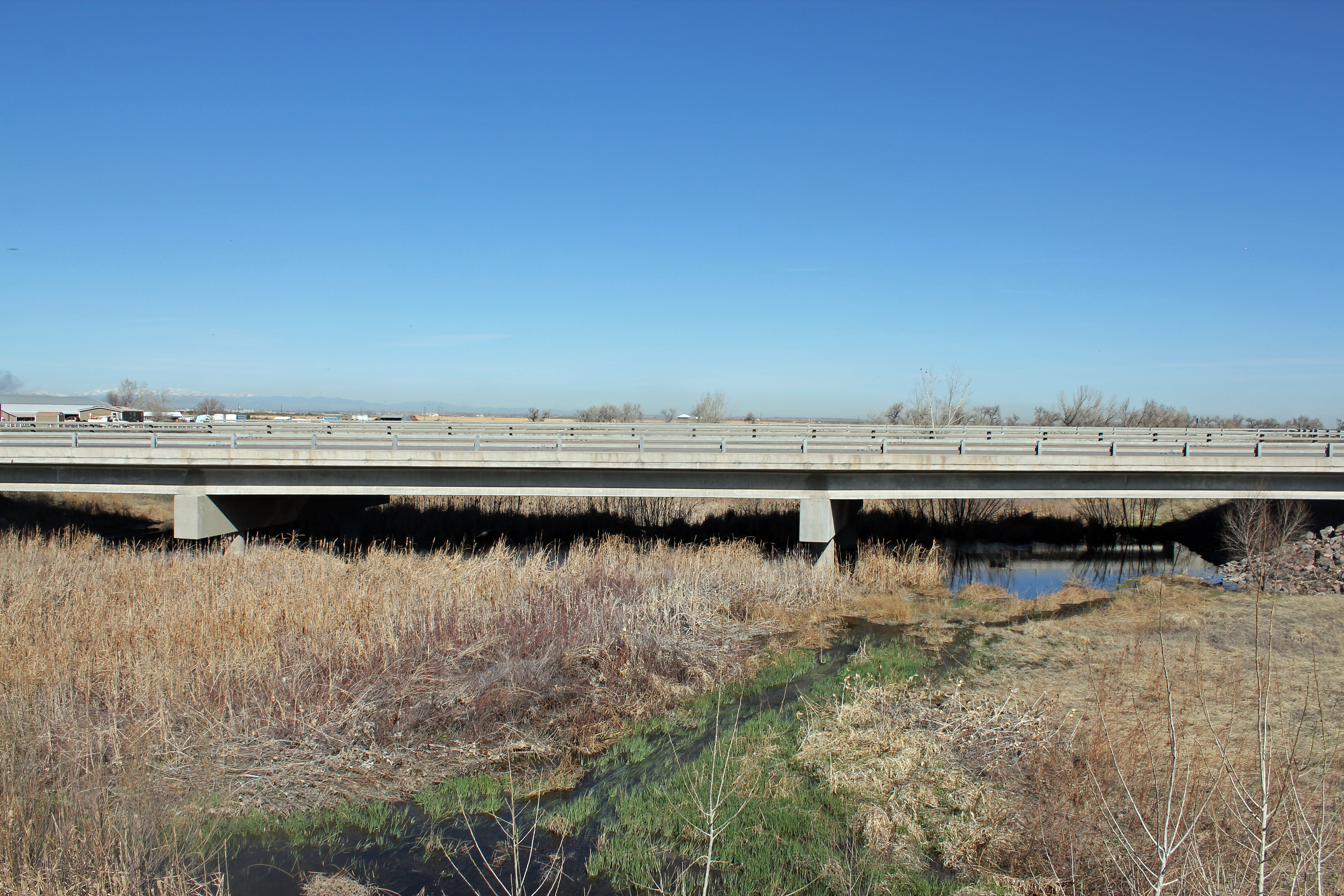
- The creek as it passes under Interstate 76

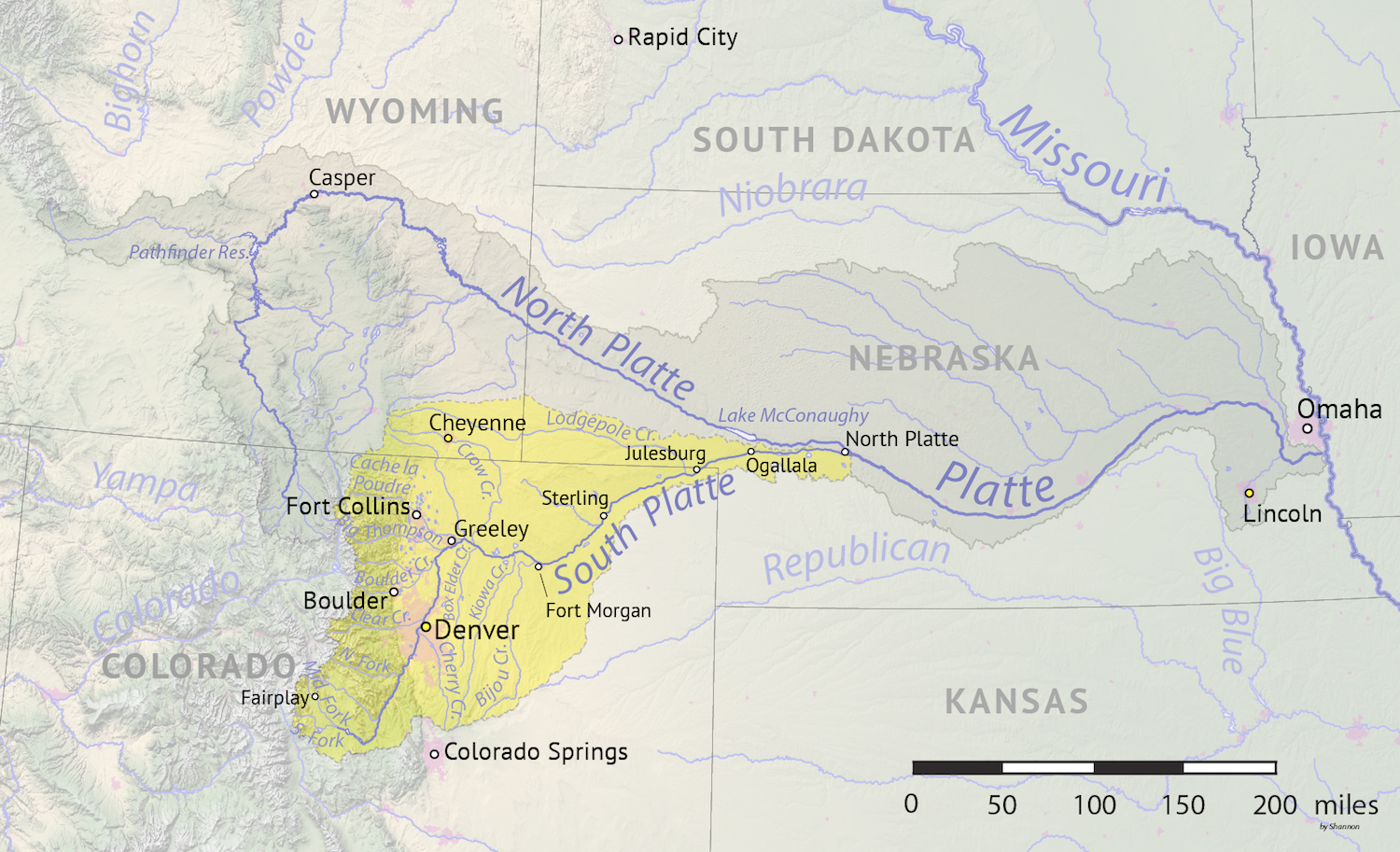
- South Platte tributaries, including Box Elder Creek

Physical characteristics
- Source
  - coordinates: 39°30′06″N 104°33′40″W
- Mouth
  - location: Confluence with the South Platte
  - coordinates: 40°22′28″N 104°28′02″W
  - elevation: 4,554 ft (1,388 m)

Basin features
- Progression: South Platte—Platte— Missouri—Mississippi

Box Elder Creek is a tributary that joins the South Platte River near Kersey, Colorado. It rises in Elbert County, Colorado.

The creek flows through Elbert, Arapahoe, Adams, and Weld counties. It passes near Denver International Airport.

It was the site of the Hungate massacre which had a family of four murdered.

== See also ==
- List of rivers of Colorado
