= Front Range Urban Corridor =

Megapolitan area in Colorado and Wyoming, United States

- Megaregion of the United States
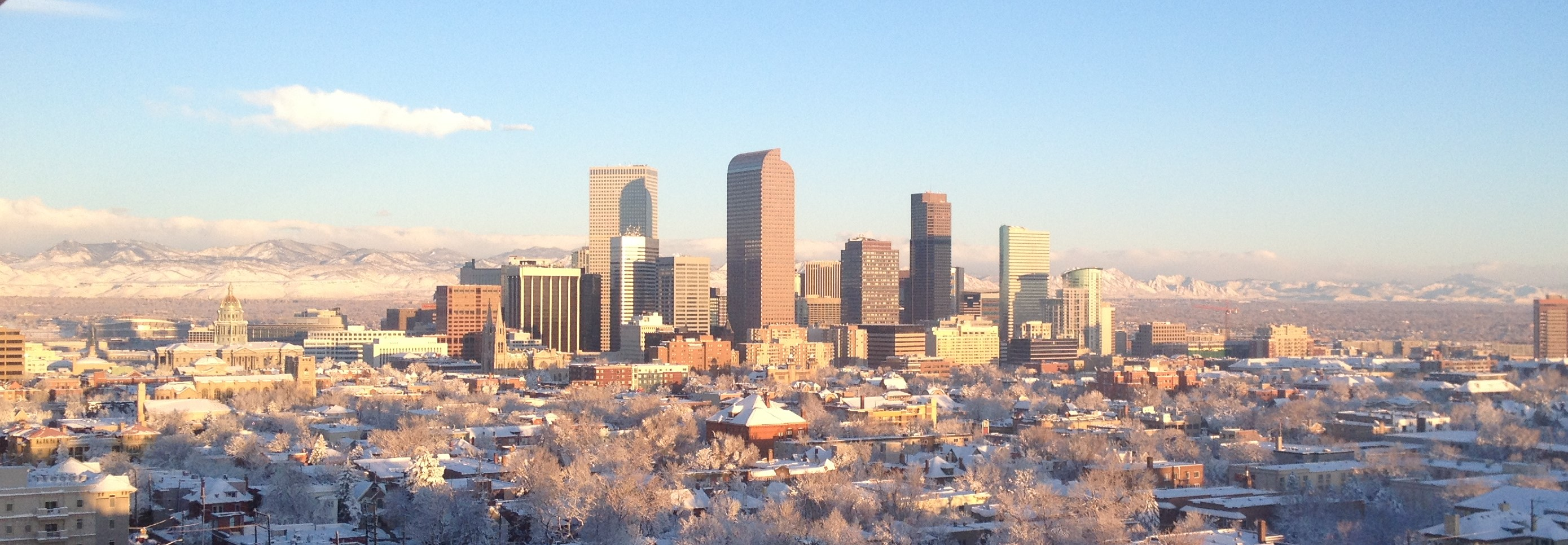
- Denver, the largest city in the metropolitan area
Interactive map of the Front Range Urban Corridor of
Colorado and Wyoming
Cheyenne, WY MSA
Fort Collins, CO MSA
Greeley, CO MSA
Boulder, CO MSA
City and County of Denver
Denver metropolitan area
Colorado Springs, CO MSA
Cañon City, CO MSA
Pueblo, CO MSA
- Coordinates: 39.7392°N 104.9850°W
- Country: United States
- States: Wyoming; Colorado
- Largest city: Denver
- Other principal cities: - Colorado Springs; - Aurora; - Fort Collins; - Lakewood; - Thornton; - Arvada; - Westminster; - Pueblo; - Greeley; - Centennial; - Boulder; - Longmont; - Cheyenne

Area
  - Total: 25,153 sq mi (65,150 km^{2})

Population (2020 census)
  - Total: 5,055,344

GDP
  - Total: $476.612 billion (2023)

The Front Range Urban Corridor is an oblong region of urban population located along the eastern face of the Southern Rocky Mountains, encompassing 18 counties in the US states of Colorado and Wyoming. The corridor derives its name from the Front Range, the mountain range that defines the western boundary of the corridor which serves as a gateway to the Rocky Mountains. The region comprises the northern portion of the Southern Rocky Mountain Front geographic area, which in turn comprises the southern portion of the Rocky Mountain Front geographic area of Canada and the United States. The Front Range Urban Corridor had a population of 5,055,344 at the 2020 census, an increase of +16.65% since the 2010 census, and a population of approximately 5.3 million as of 2025 census estimates.

The corridor contains some of the West's largest cities, such as Denver and Colorado Springs. It also contains smaller but significant urban areas such as Pueblo, Fort Collins and Cheyenne. Its main transportation corridor is Interstate 25. There have been many proposals over the years for a single passenger rail connecting most of the major urban areas within the corridor, although none have come to fruition as of mid-2026. Plans are actively under development and moving forward for the Colorado Connector (CoCo), also known as the Front Range Passenger Rail. The first phase of service connecting Denver and Fort Collins could commence as soon as 2029, with full corridor service (sans Cheyenne, Wyoming) occurring just a few years after that.

== Extent ==
The Front Range Urban Corridor stretches about 200 miles (320 km) from Pueblo, Colorado, north along Interstate 25 to Cheyenne, Wyoming, and includes the Denver-Aurora-Lakewood, CO Metropolitan Statistical Area; the Colorado Springs, CO Metropolitan Statistical Area; the Boulder, CO Metropolitan Statistical Area; the Fort Collins, CO Metropolitan Statistical Area; the Greeley, CO Metropolitan Statistical Area; the Pueblo, CO Metropolitan Statistical Area; the Cheyenne, WY Metropolitan Statistical Area; and the Cañon City, CO Micropolitan Statistical Area. The corridor comprises three primary subregions: the South Central Colorado Urban Area, the North Central Colorado Urban Area, and the Cheyenne Metropolitan Area.

The influence of the Corridor extends well beyond its defined boundaries. The Colorado Eastern Plains, several Colorado mountain communities and counties, the Nebraska Panhandle, and Albany County, Wyoming, among other areas, are culturally and economically tied to the Corridor, though they are not considered to be a part of it.

The definition included here is not used for the greater Southern Rocky Mountain Front, one of the 11 proposed megaregions of the United States. That megaregion's area is larger and extends beyond, south from Pueblo along the I-25 corridor into New Mexico. That 330-mile extension (530 km) including Albuquerque and Santa Fe isn't agreed upon by some planners due to the lack of population and other attributes the megaregion concept is based on.

== Counties ==
The 18 counties of the Front Range Urban Corridor
2020 rank	County	2020 census	Change	2010 census	Change	2000 census	Area (mi^{2})	Core-based statistical area	Urban region
1	El Paso County, Colorado	730,395	+17.38%	622,263	+20.38%	516,934	2,130	Colorado Springs, CO MSA	South Central Colorado
2	City and County of Denver, Colorado	715,522	+19.22%	600,158	+8.37%	553,805	155	Denver-Aurora-Centennial, CO MSA	North Central Colorado
3	Arapahoe County, Colorado	655,070	+14.52%	572,003	+17.01%	488,829	855	Denver-Aurora-Centennial, CO MSA	North Central Colorado
4	Jefferson County, Colorado	582,910	+9.05%	534,543	+1.73%	525,449	774	Denver-Aurora-Centennial, CO MSA	North Central Colorado
5	Adams County, Colorado	519,572	+17.66%	441,603	+26.87%	348,076	1,184	Denver-Aurora-Centennial, CO MSA	North Central Colorado
6	Larimer County, Colorado	359,066	+19.84%	299,630	+19.14%	251,494	2,634	Fort Collins-Loveland, CO MSA	North Central Colorado
7	Douglas County, Colorado	357,978	+25.40%	285,465	+62.44%	175,732	843	Denver-Aurora-Centennial, CO MSA	North Central Colorado
8	Boulder County, Colorado	330,758	+12.29%	294,567	+9.19%	269,784	740	Boulder, CO MSA	North Central Colorado
9	Weld County, Colorado	328,981	+30.12%	252,825	+39.86%	180,766	4,017	Greeley, CO MSA	North Central Colorado
10	Pueblo County, Colorado	168,162	+5.72%	159,063	+12.42%	141,490	2,398	Pueblo, CO MSA	South Central Colorado
11	Laramie County, Wyoming	100,512	+9.56%	91,738	+12.41%	81,607	2,688	Cheyenne, WY MSA	Southeast Wyoming
12	City and County of Broomfield, Colorado	74,112	+32.61%	55,889	+42.57%	39,202	34	Denver-Aurora-Centennial, CO MSA	North Central Colorado
13	Fremont County, Colorado	48,939	+4.52%	46,824	+1.47%	46,145	1,534	Cañon City, CO MSA	South Central Colorado
14	Elbert County, Colorado	26,062	+12.89%	23,086	+16.17%	19,872	1,851	Denver-Aurora-Centennial, CO MSA	North Central Colorado
15	Teller County, Colorado	24,710	+5.82%	23,350	+13.60%	20,555	559	Colorado Springs, CO MSA	South Central Colorado
16	Park County, Colorado	17,390	+7.31%	16,206	+11.59%	14,523	2,211	Denver-Aurora-Centennial, CO MSA	North Central Colorado
17	Clear Creek County, Colorado	9,397	+3.40%	9,088	−2.51%	9,322	396	Denver-Aurora-Centennial, CO MSA	North Central Colorado
18	Gilpin County, Colorado	5,808	+6.75%	5,441	+14.38%	4,757	150	Denver-Aurora-Centennial, CO MSA	North Central Colorado
Total	18 counties	5,055,344	+16.65%	4,333,742	+17.50%	3,688,342	25,153	8 core-based statistical areas	3 urban regions

== Municipalities ==
The 19 municipalities of the Front Range Urban Corridor with a population of at least 50,000
2020 rank	Municipality	2020 census	Change	2010 census	Change	2000 census
1	City and County of Denver, Colorado	715,522	+19.22%	600,158	+8.21%	554,636
2	City of Colorado Springs, Colorado	478,961	+15.02%	416,427	+15.39%	360,890
3	City of Aurora, Colorado	386,261	+18.82%	325,078	+17.61%	276,393
4	City of Fort Collins, Colorado	169,810	+17.94%	143,986	+21.35%	118,652
5	City of Lakewood, Colorado	155,984	+9.09%	142,980	−0.80%	144,126
6	City of Thornton, Colorado	141,867	+19.44%	118,772	+44.17%	82,384
7	City of Arvada, Colorado	124,402	+16.88%	106,433	+4.19%	102,153
8	City of Westminster, Colorado	116,317	+9.62%	106,114	+5.13%	100,940
9	City of Pueblo, Colorado	111,876	+4.95%	106,595	+4.38%	102,121
10	City of Greeley, Colorado	108,795	+17.12%	92,889	+20.74%	76,930
11	City of Centennial, Colorado	108,418	+8.01%	100,377	NA	NA
12	City of Boulder, Colorado	108,250	+11.16%	97,385	+2.86%	94,673
13	City of Longmont, Colorado	98,885	+14.62%	86,270	+21.35%	71,093
14	City of Loveland, Colorado	76,378	+14.24%	66,859	+32.11%	50,608
15	City and County of Broomfield, Colorado	74,112	+32.61%	55,889	+46.03%	38,272
16	Town of Castle Rock, Colorado	73,158	+51.68%	48,231	+138.48%	20,224
17	City of Cheyenne, Wyoming	65,132	+9.53%	59,466	+12.18%	53,011
18	City of Commerce City, Colorado	62,418	+35.95%	45,913	+118.73%	20,991
19	Town of Parker, Colorado	58,512	+29.17%	45,297	+92.28%	23,558

== Wyoming jurisdictions ==
In Wyoming, the Front Range Urban Corridor includes the Town of Albin, the Town of Burns, the City of Cheyenne, the Town of Pine Bluffs, and unincorporated Laramie County.

== Colorado jurisdictions ==
In Colorado, the Front Range Urban Corridor includes:

- Town of Alma
- City of Arvada
- Town of Ault
- City of Aurora
- Town of Bennett
- Town of Berthoud
- City of Black Hawk
- Town of Boone
- City of Boulder
- Town of Bow Mar
- City of Brighton
- Town of Brookside
- City and County of Broomfield
- Town of Calhan
- City of Cañon City
- City of Castle Pines North
- Town of Castle Rock
- City of Centennial
- Central City
- City of Cherry Hills Village
- Town of Coal Creek
- City of Colorado Springs
- Town of Columbine Valley
- City of Commerce City
- City of Cripple Creek
- City of Dacono
- Town of Deer Trail
- City and County of Denver
- Town of Eaton
- City of Edgewater
- Town of Elizabeth
- Town of Empire
- City of Englewood
- Town of Erie
- Town of Estes Park
- City of Evans
- Town of Fairplay
- City of Federal Heights
- Town of Firestone
- City of Florence
- City of Fort Collins
- City of Fort Lupton
- City of Fountain
- Town of Foxfield
- Town of Frederick
- Town of Garden City
- Town of Georgetown
- Town of Gilcrest
- City of Glendale
- City of Golden
- City of Greeley
- Town of Green Mountain Falls
- City of Greenwood Village
- Town of Grover
- Town of Hudson
- City of Idaho Springs
- Town of Jamestown
- Town of Johnstown
- Town of Keenesburg
- Town of Kersey
- Town of Kiowa
- Town of La Salle
- City of Lafayette
- Town of Lakeside
- City of Lakewood
- Town of Larkspur
- City of Littleton
- Town of Lochbuie
- City of Lone Tree
- City of Longmont
- City of Louisville
- City of Loveland
- Town of Lyons
- City of Manitou Springs
- Town of Mead
- Town of Milliken
- Town of Monument
- Town of Morrison
- Town of Mountain View
- Town of Nederland
- City of Northglenn
- Town of Nunn
- Town of Palmer Lake
- Town of Parker
- Town of Pierce
- Town of Platteville
- City of Pueblo
- Town of Ramah
- Town of Raymer
- Town of Rockvale
- Town of Rye
- Town of Severance
- City of Sheridan
- Town of Silver Plume
- Town of Simla
- Town of Superior
- City of Thornton
- Town of Timnath
- City of Victor
- Town of Ward
- Town of Wellington
- City of Westminster
- City of Wheat Ridge
- Town of Williamsburg
- Town of Windsor
- City of Woodland Park
- unincorporated Adams County
- unincorporated Arapahoe County
- unincorporated Boulder County
- unincorporated Clear Creek County
- unincorporated Douglas County
- unincorporated El Paso County
- unincorporated Elbert County
- unincorporated Fremont County
- unincorporated Gilpin County
- unincorporated Jefferson County
- unincorporated Larimer County
- unincorporated Park County
- unincorporated Pueblo County
- unincorporated Teller County
- unincorporated Weld County

== Gallery of the most populous municipalities ==
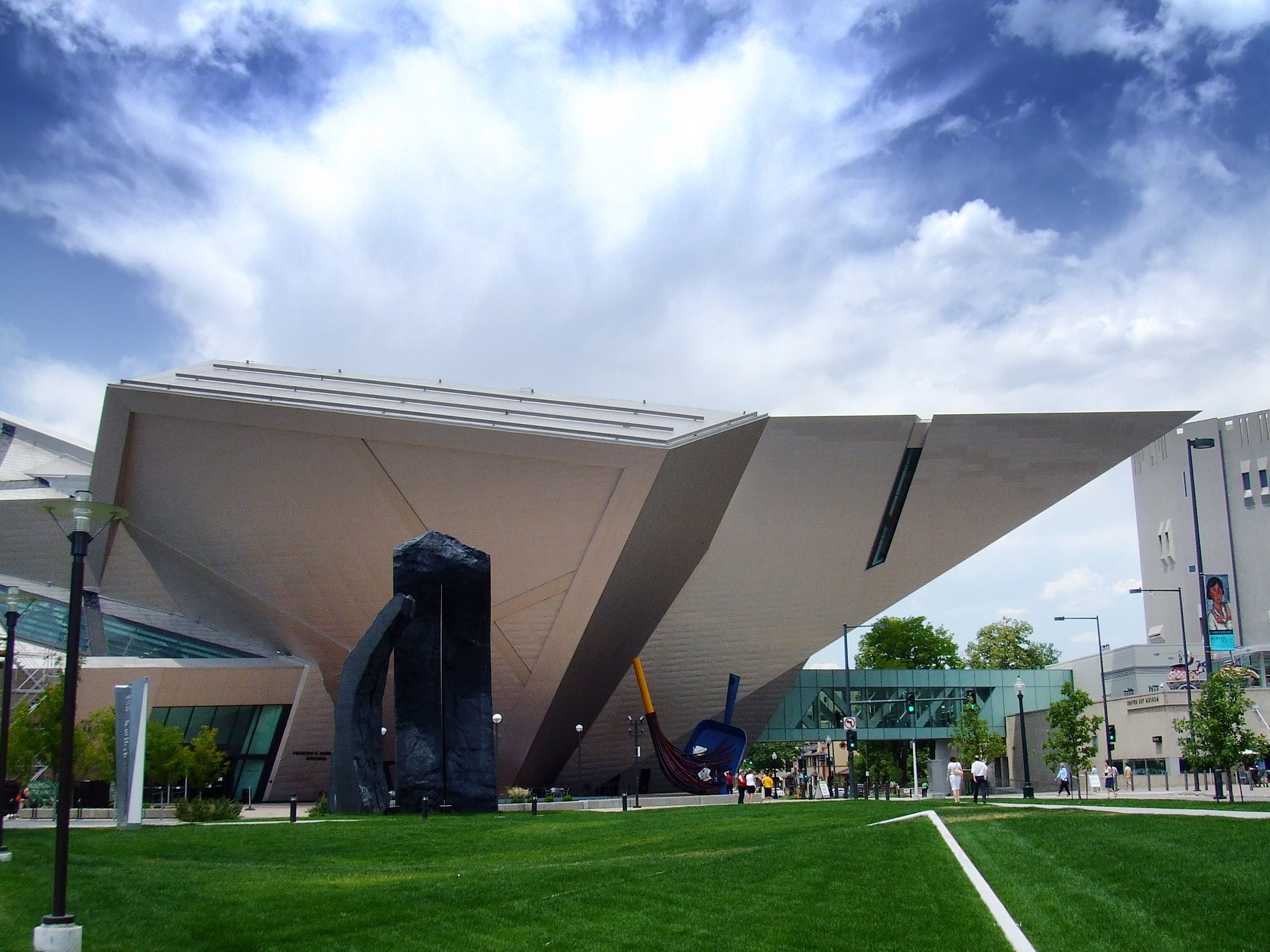
1. The Denver Art Museum in Denver

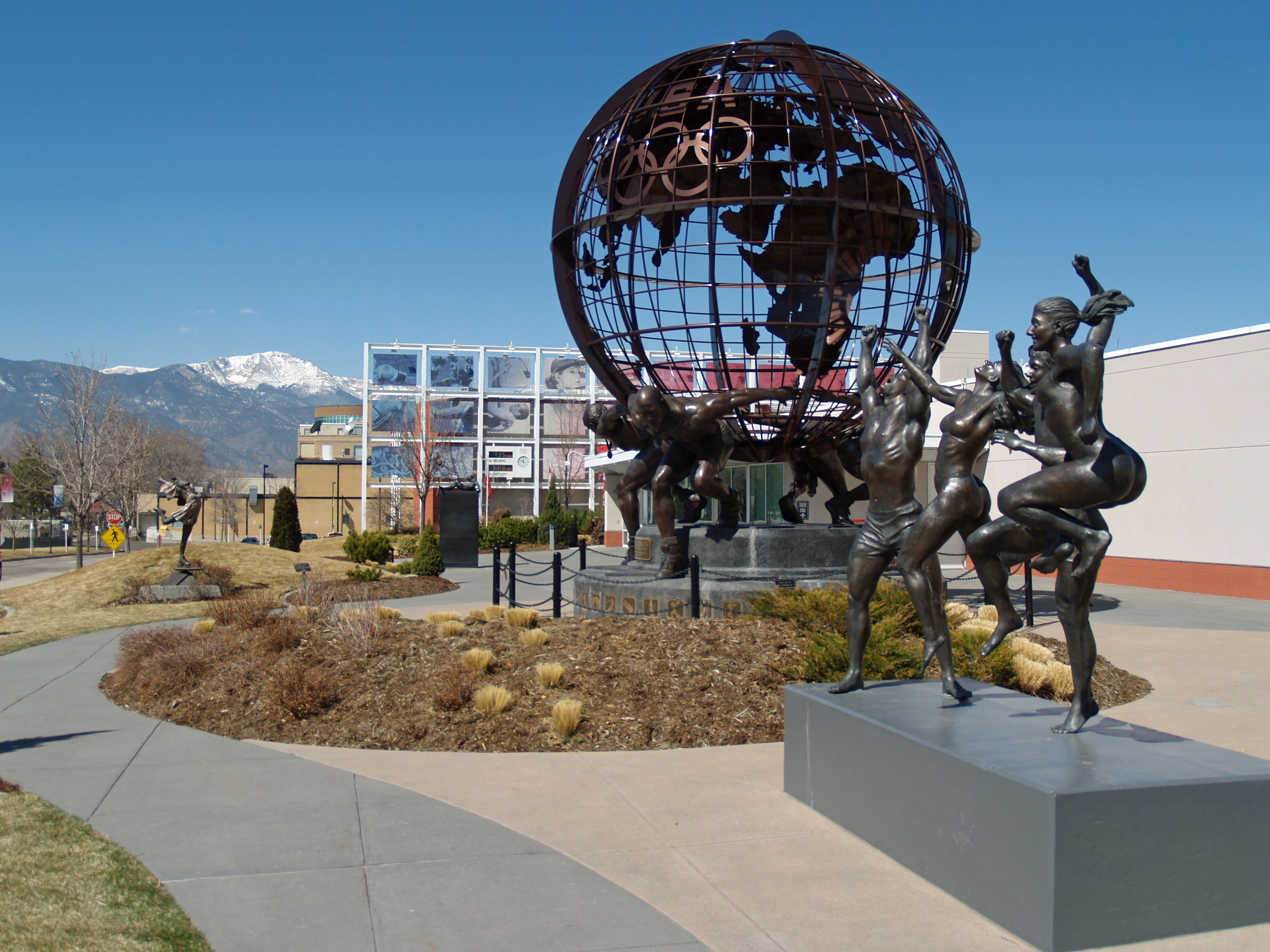
2. The United States Olympic Training Center in Colorado Springs

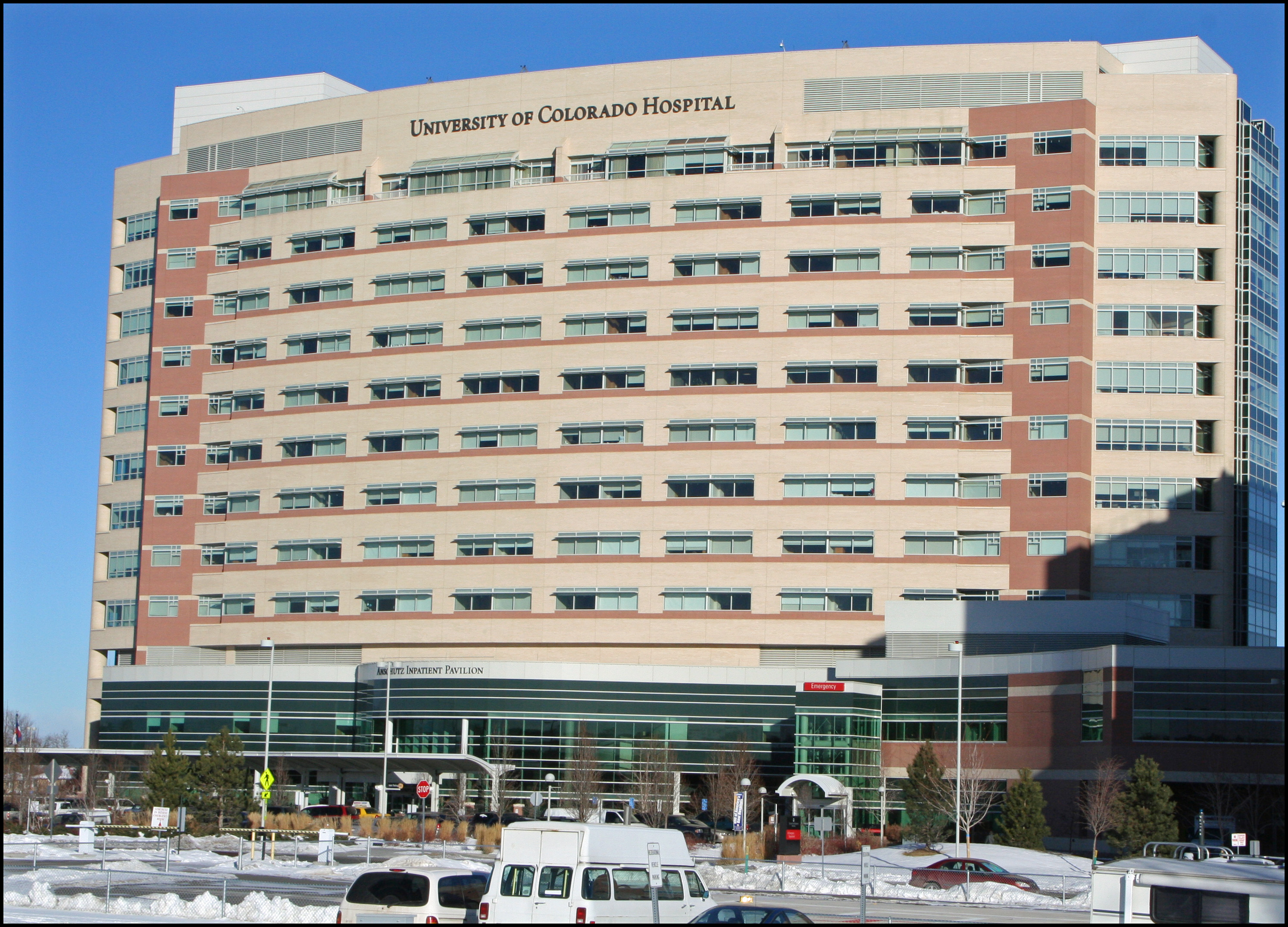
3. The University of Colorado Hospital in Aurora

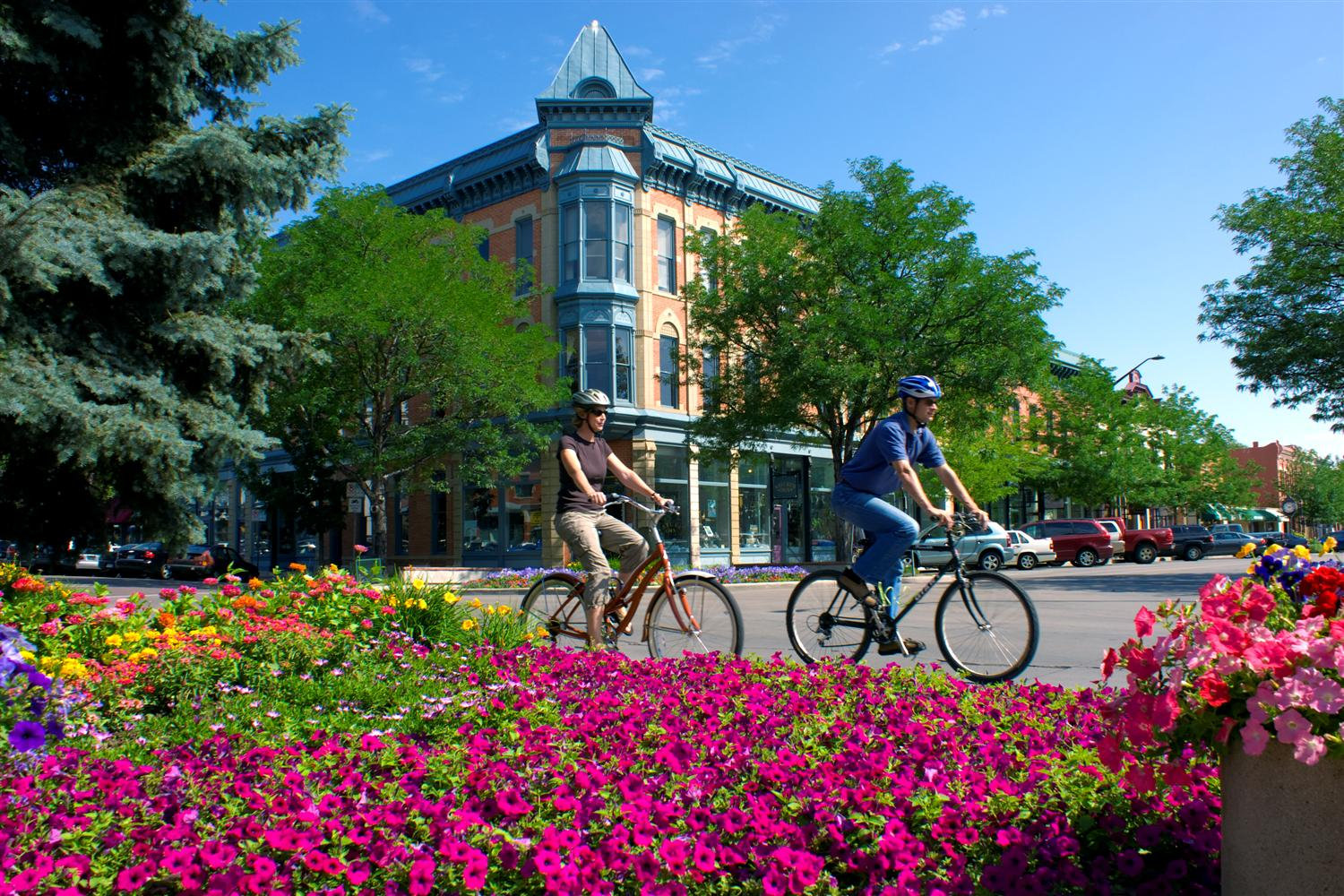
4. Downtown Fort Collins

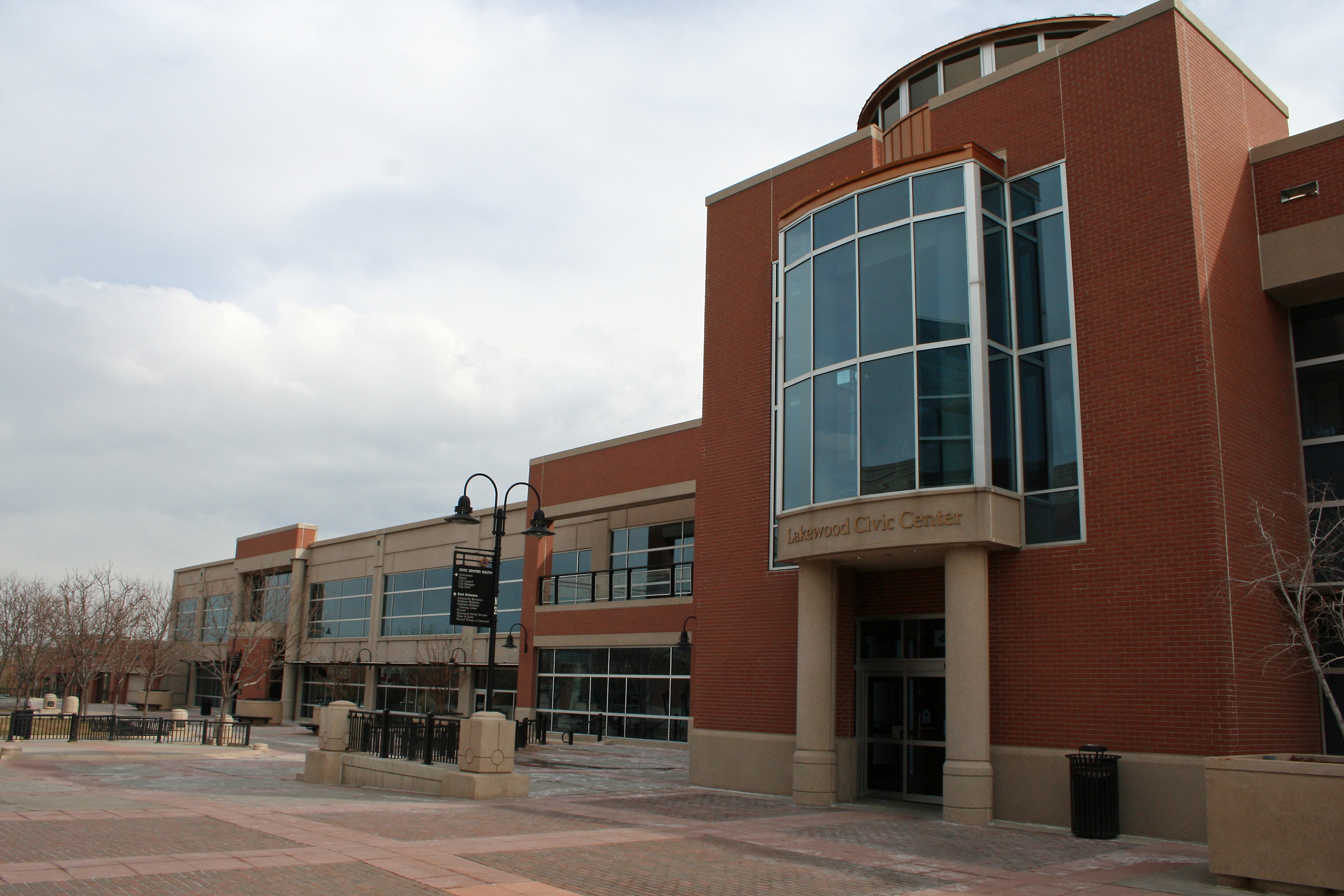
5. The Lakewood Civic Center in Lakewood

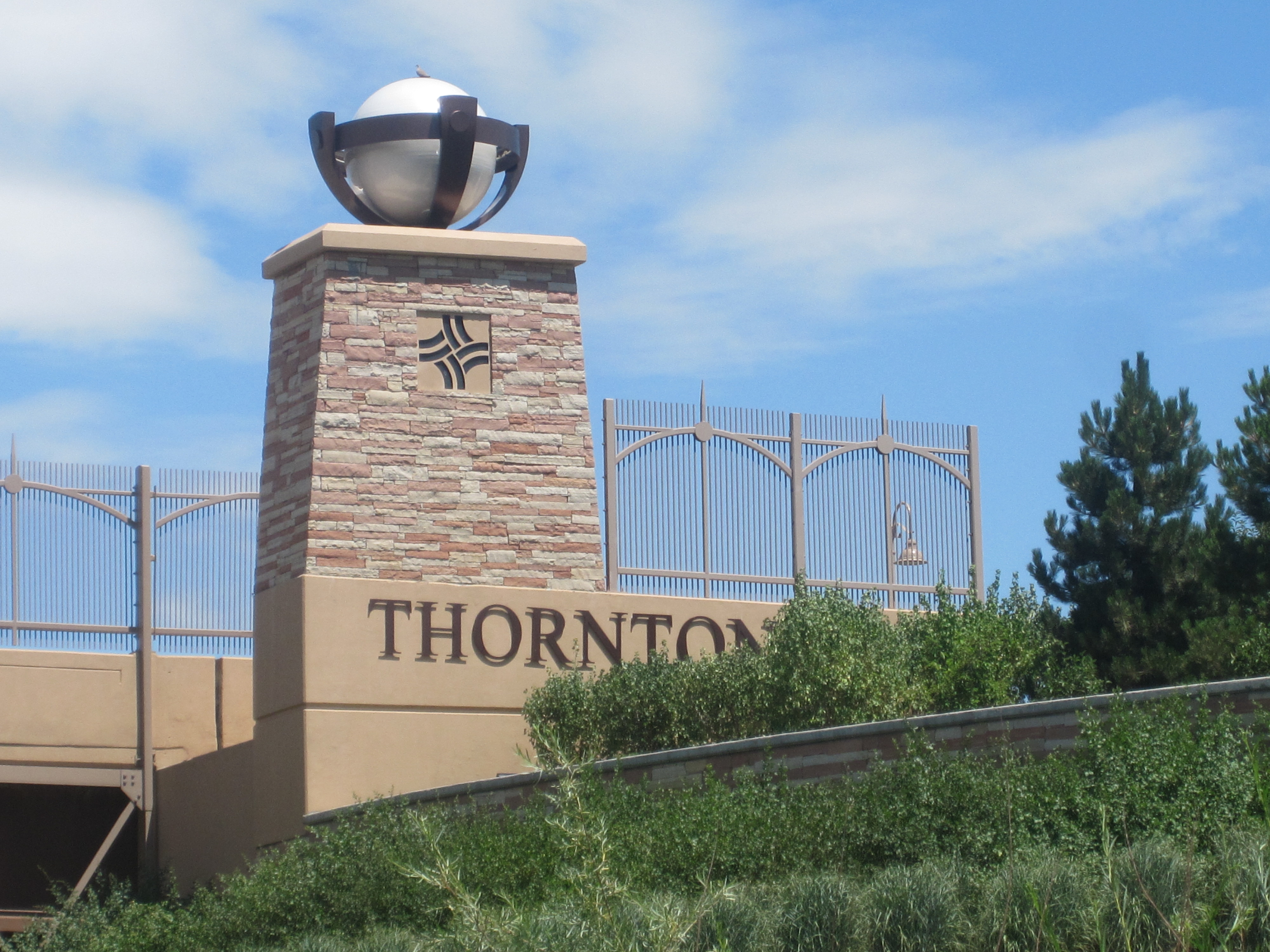
6. Thornton welcome sign from Interstate 25

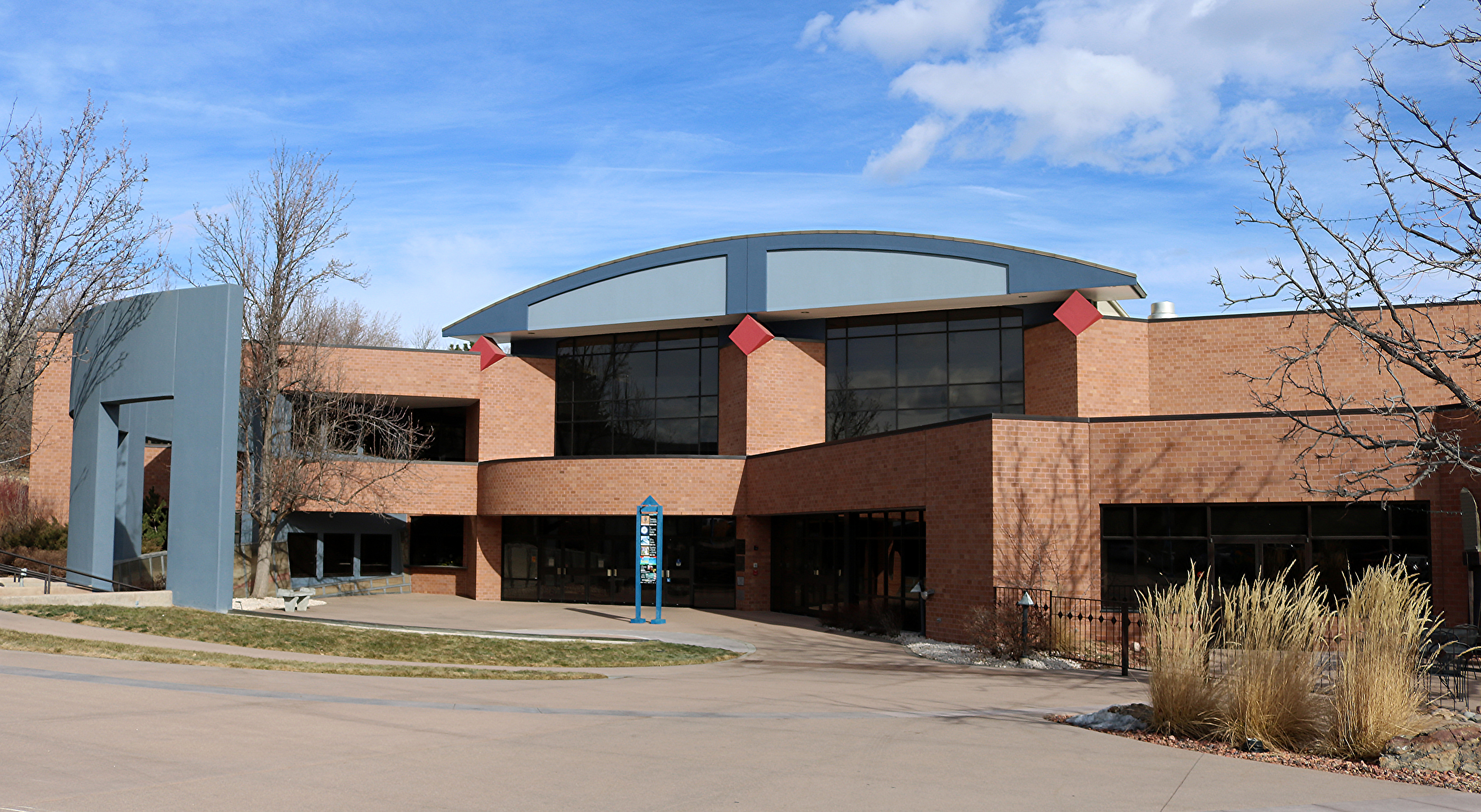
7. The Arvada Center for the Arts and Humanities in Arvada

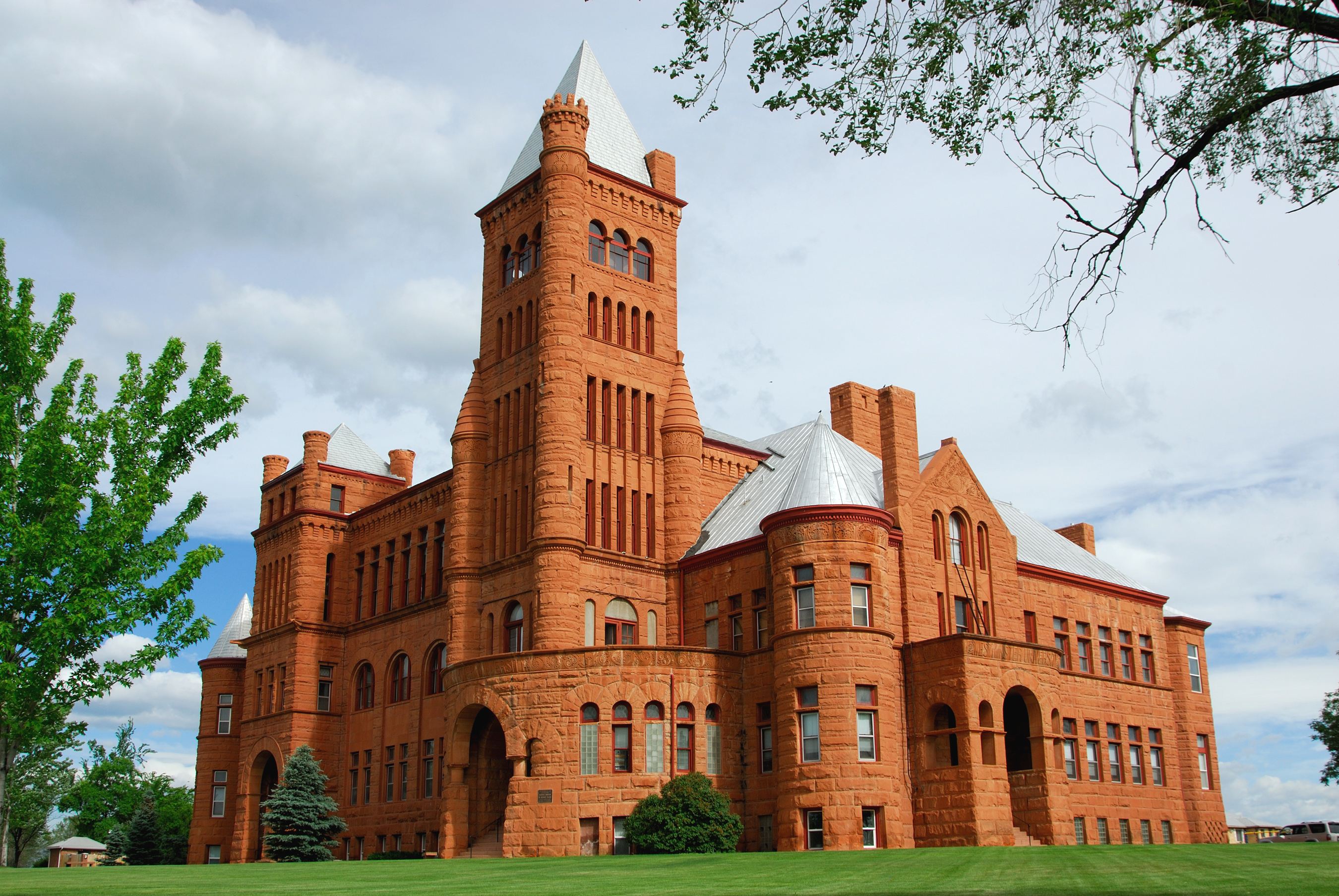
8. Westminster Castle in Westminster

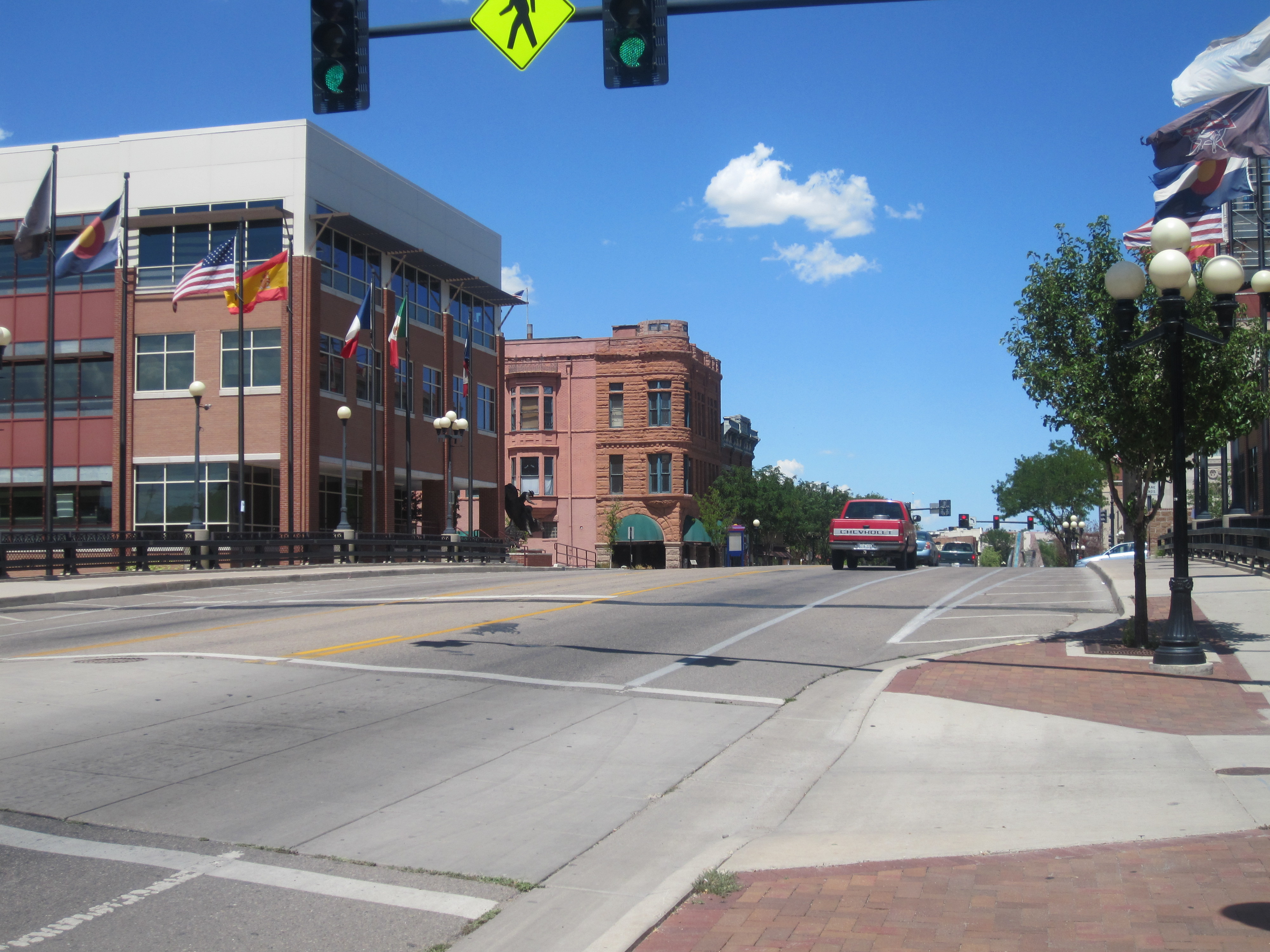
9. Downtown Pueblo

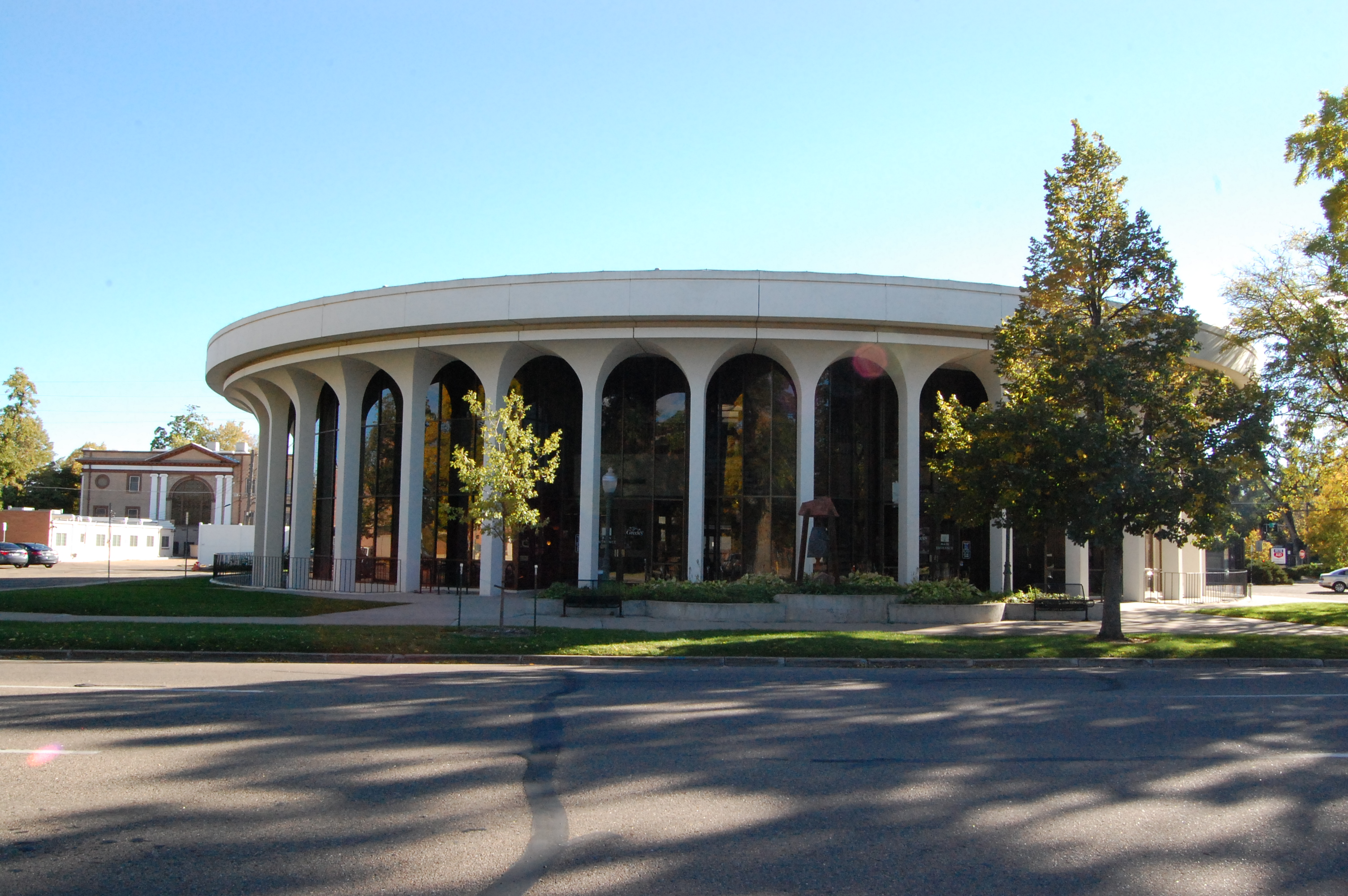
10. City Hall in Greeley

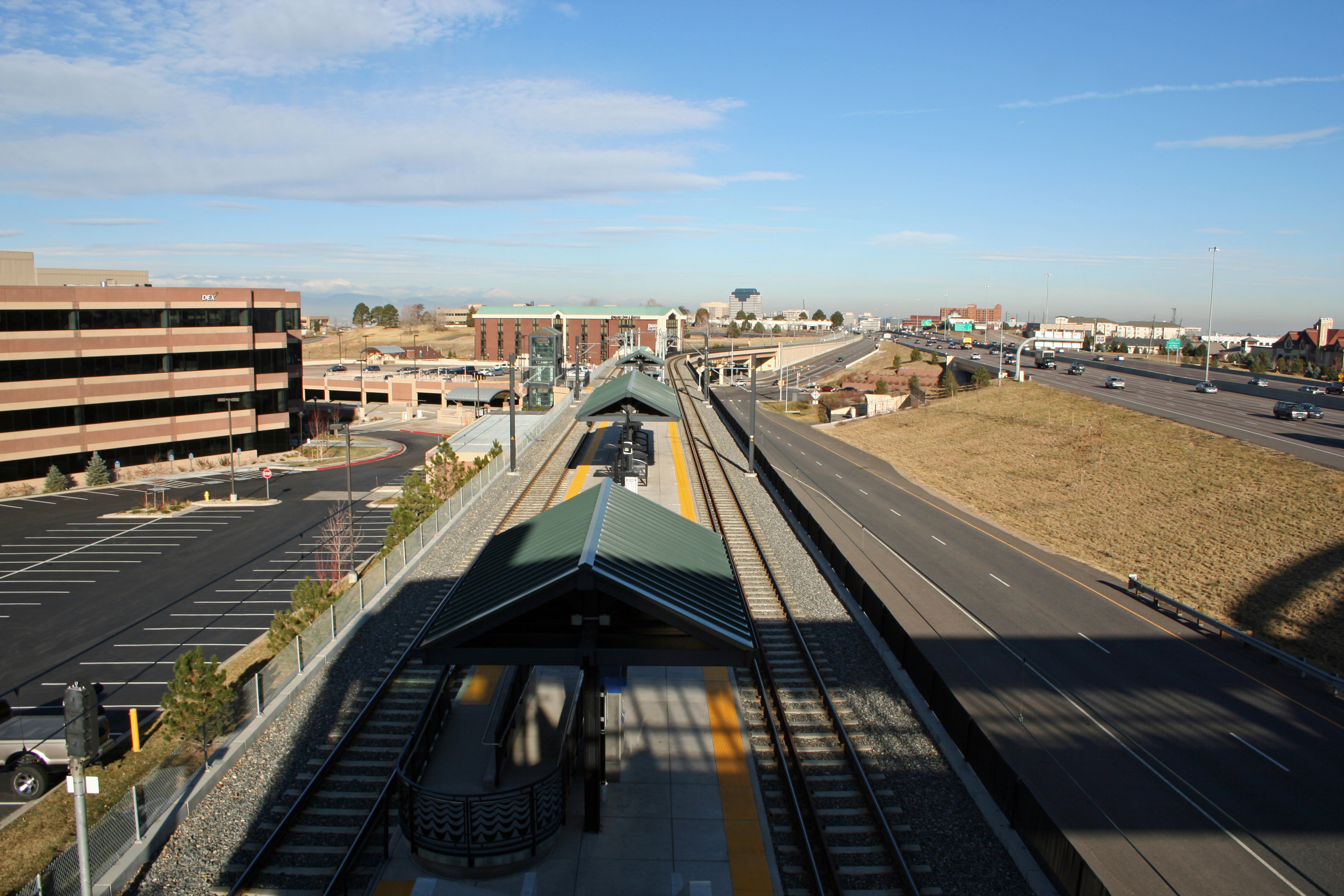
11. The Dry Creek Station in Centennial

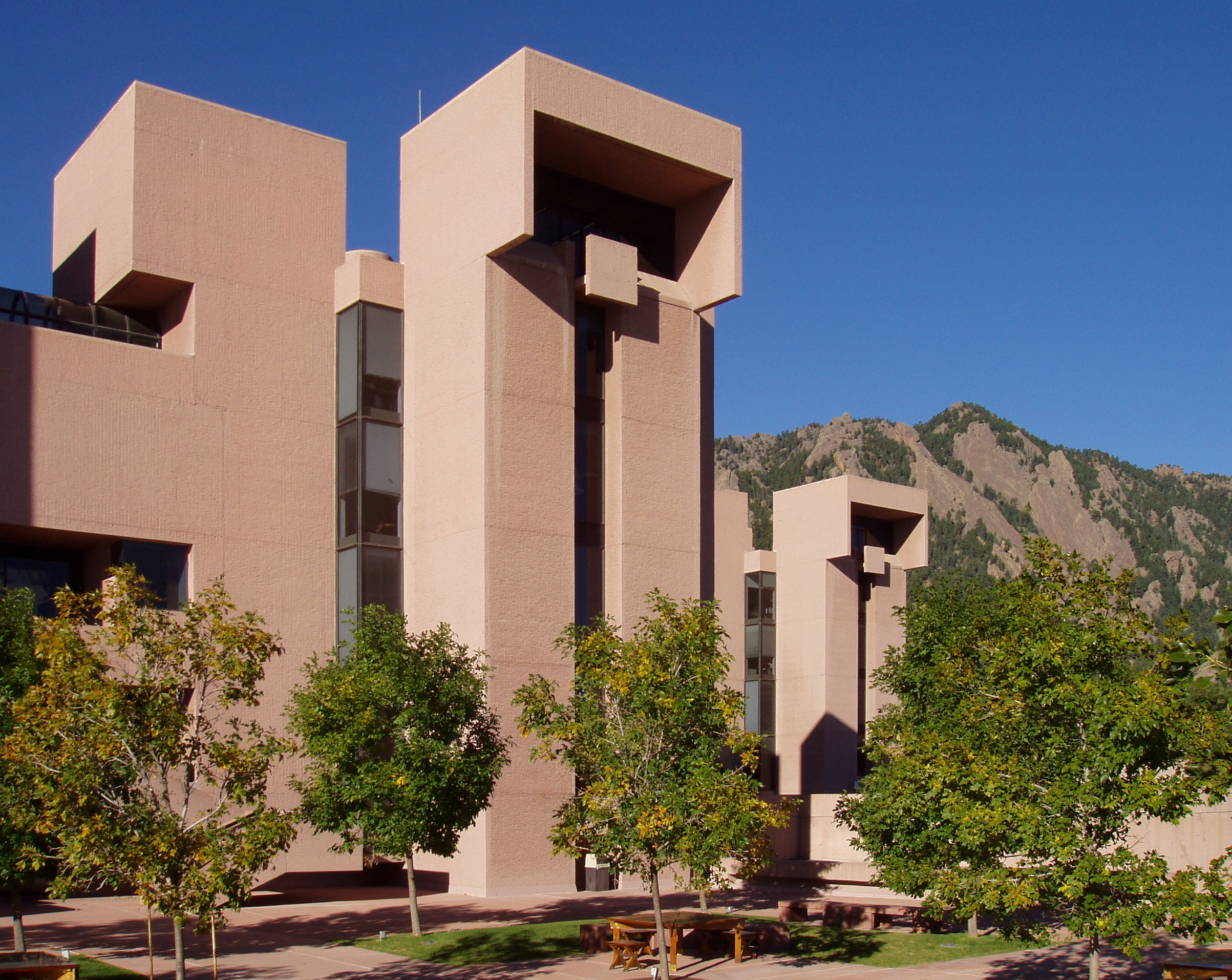
12. The National Center for Atmospheric Research in Boulder

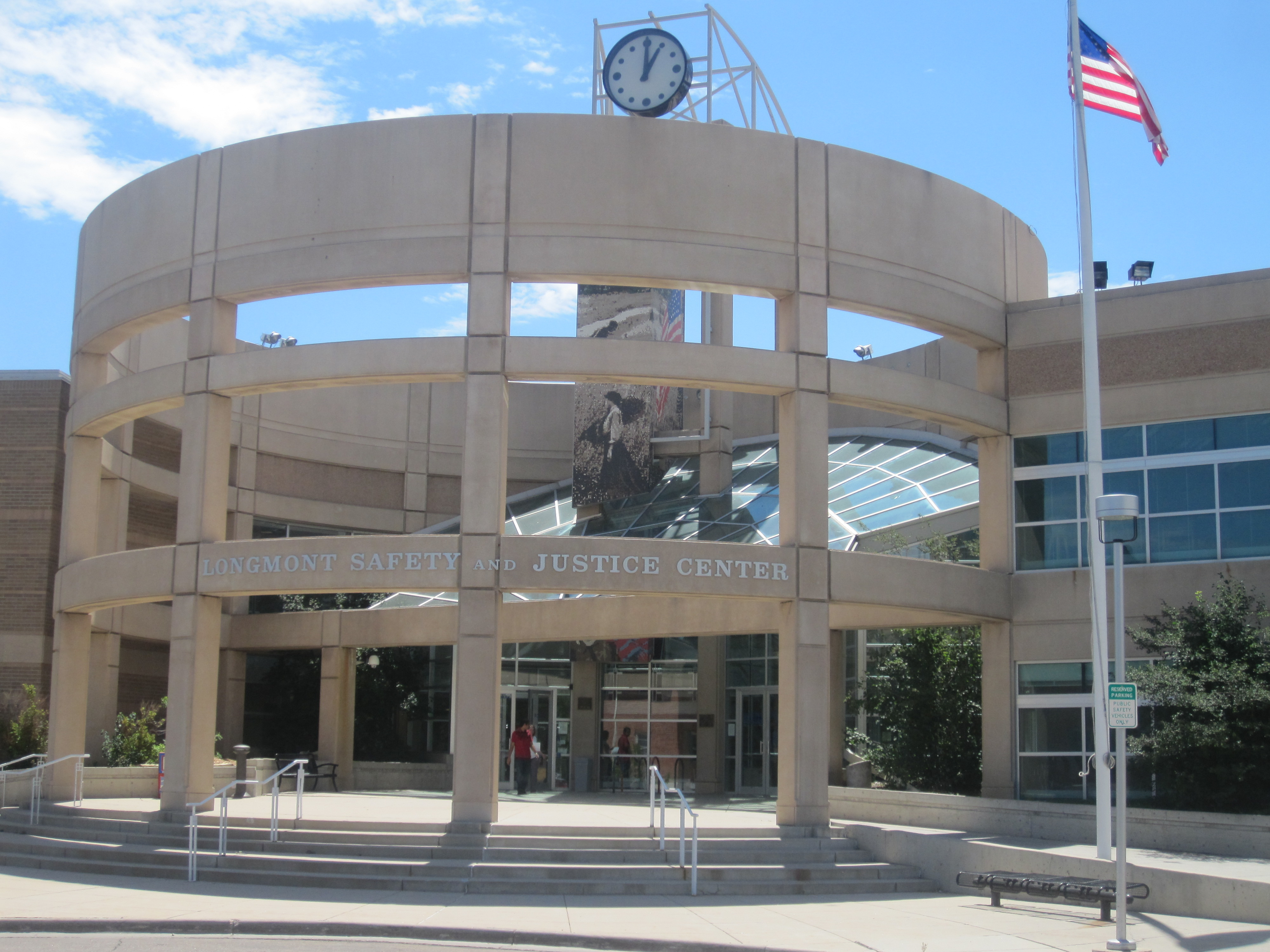
13. The Longmont Safety and Justice Center in Longmont

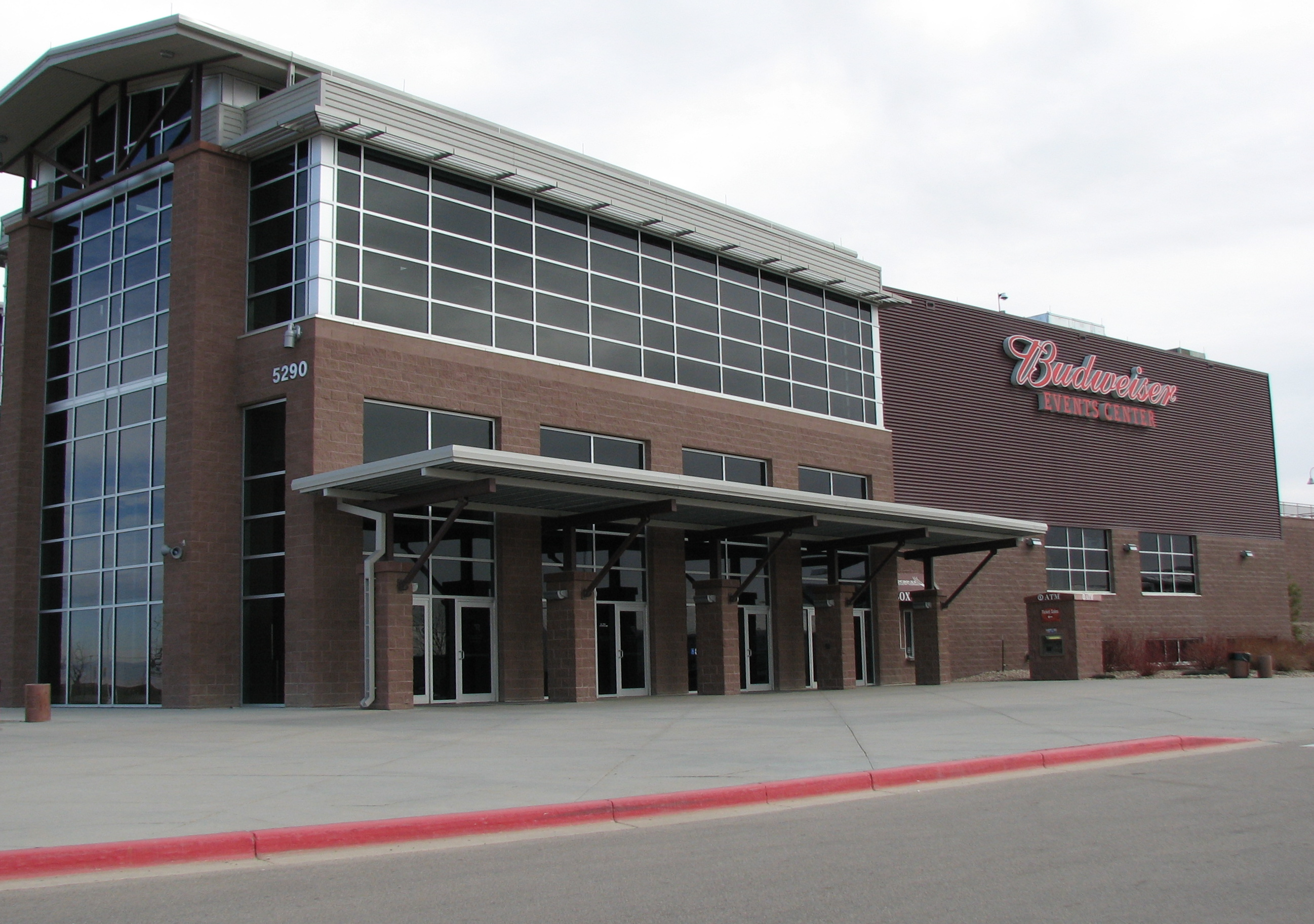
14. The Budweiser Events Center in Loveland

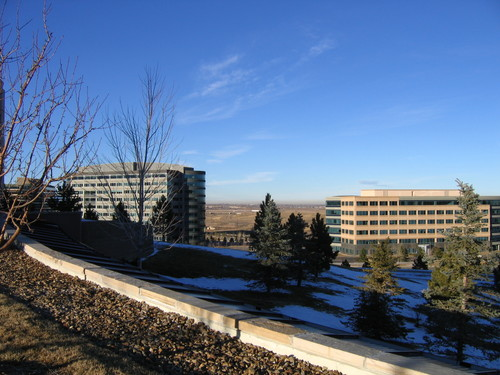
15. The Interlocken Office Park in Broomfield

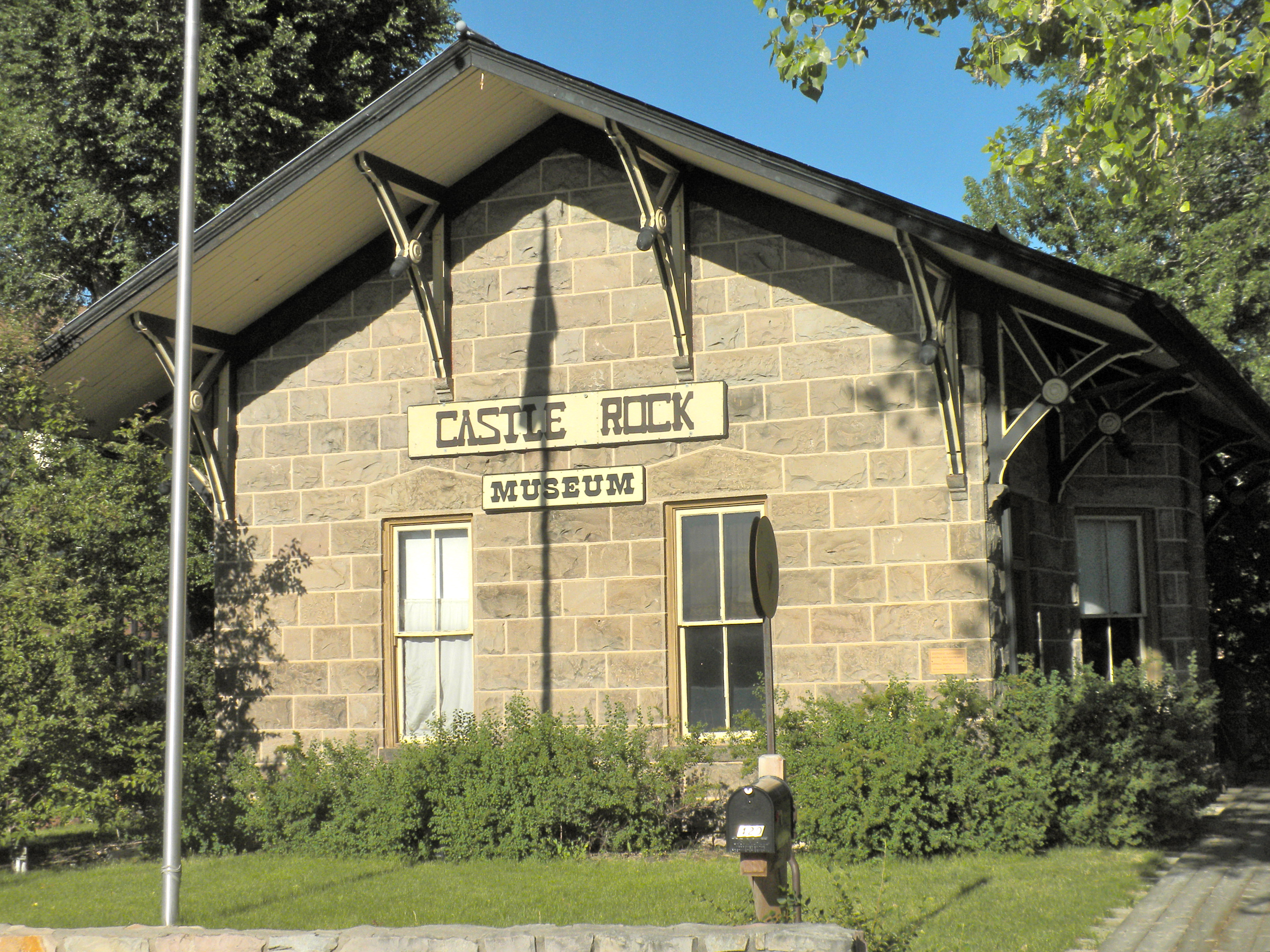
16. The Castle Rock Depot in Castle Rock

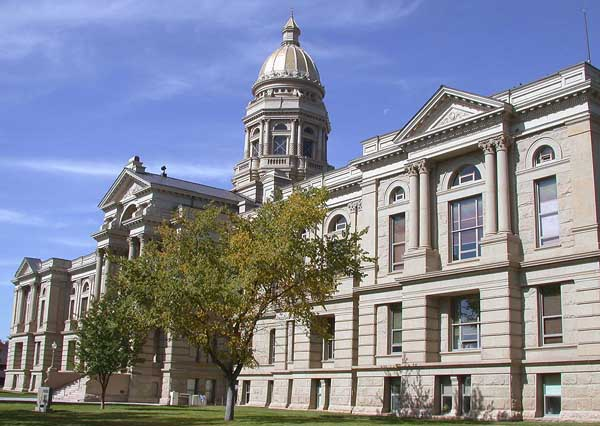
17. The Wyoming State Capitol in Cheyenne

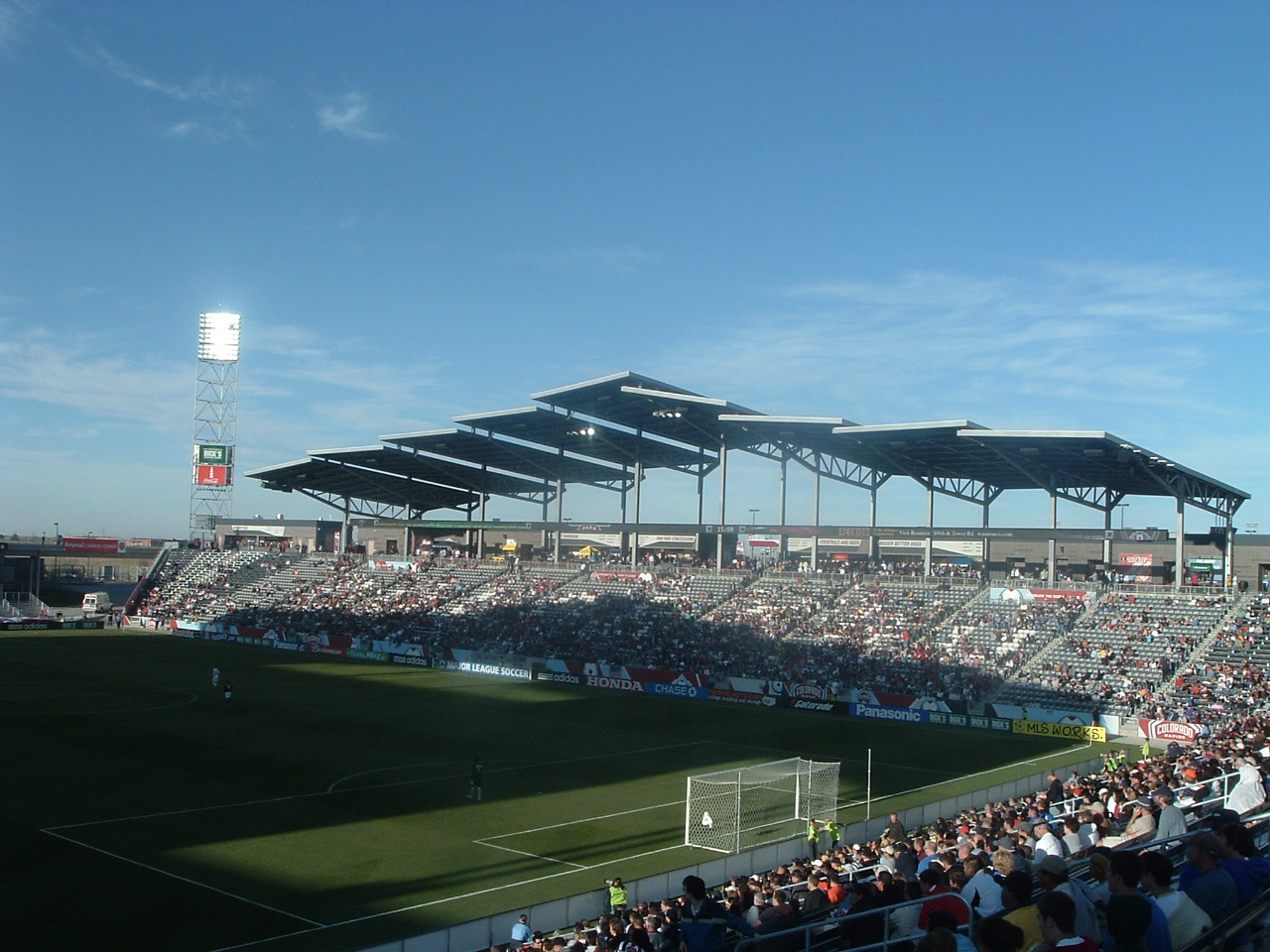
18. Dick's Sporting Goods Park in Commerce City

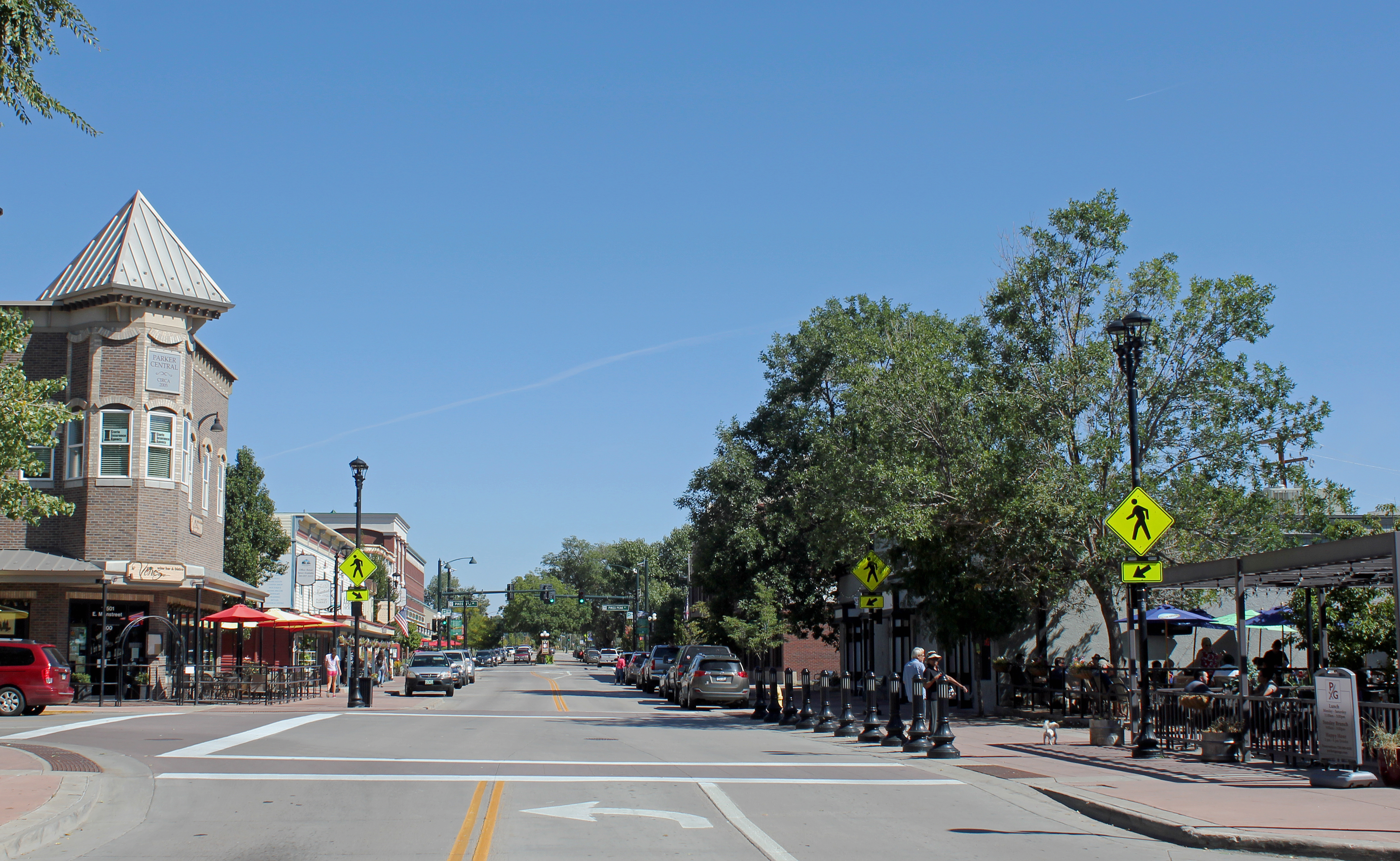
19. Mainstreet in downtown Parker

== See also ==
- Southern Rocky Mountain Front
  - Front Range Urban Corridor
    - Southeast Wyoming
    - North Central Colorado Urban Area
    - South Central Colorado Urban Area
- Colorado
  - Colorado statistical areas
- Wyoming
  - Wyoming statistical areas
