= Colorado State Highway 86 =

State highway in Colorado, United States

State Highway 86
- SH 86 highlighted in red

Route information
- Maintained by CDOT
- Length: 61.47 mi (98.93 km)

Major junctions
- West end: I-25 / US 85 / US 87 in Castle Rock
- SH 83 in Franktown
- East end: I-70 / US 40 near Limon

Location
- Country: United States
- State: Colorado
- Counties: Douglas, Elbert

Highway system
- Colorado State Highway System; Interstate; US; State; Scenic
← US 85	→ US 87

State Highway 86 (SH 86) is a 61.47-mile-long (98.93 km) state highway in the U.S. State of Colorado. It runs from Interstate 25 (I-25), U.S. Route 85 (US 85) and US 87 in Castle Rock, eastward to I-70 and US 40 near Limon. It gives service through eastern Castle Rock to Franktown and then to Elizabeth then from Kiowa to I-70 and US 40 (Exit 352).

== Route description ==
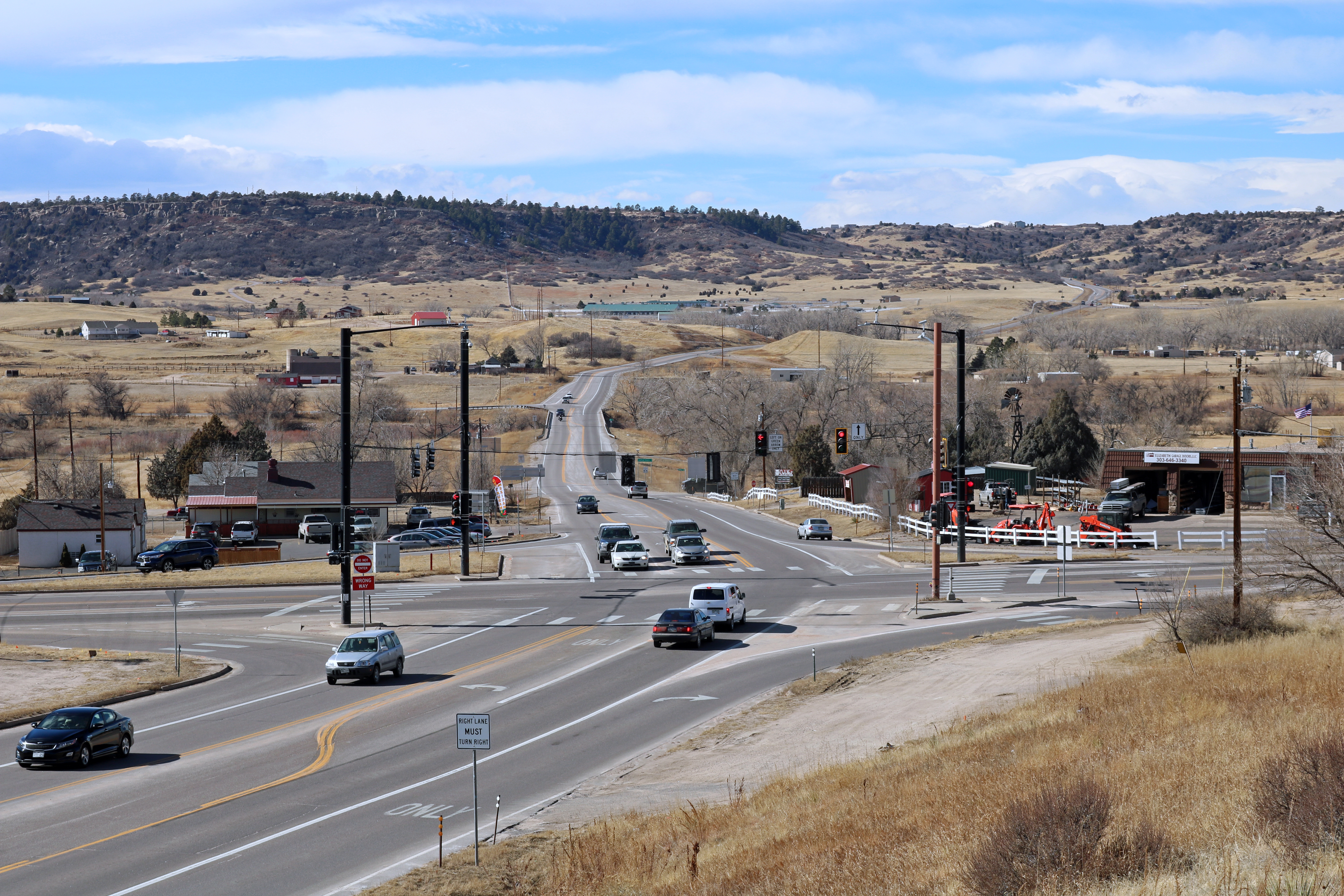
SH 86 (lower left corner to top) and SH 83 (left to right) in Franktown

The route begins at I-25, US 85 and US 87 in Castle Rock, where it begins eastward. The route then exits the town and enters Franktown where it meets SH 83. It then crosses the county line into Elbert, where it meets many county roads in various towns before meeting its east end at I-70 and US 40.

== History ==
The route was established in the 1920s, when it began at US 85 at Castle Rock. The route then moved eastward along CR 118 to US 40. In the 1960s, the eastward routing was changed so it follows its current routing. By 1954, the route was paved to Kiowa from US 85 by 1954 and to its entire length by 1972. Following the construction of Interstate 25, the terminus became a business loop of I-25; however, the business loop was deleted in the 1990s, leaving SH 86's terminus at a local road. However, SH 86's terminus was rerouted to US 85 in 2006.

== Major intersections ==
County	Location	mi	km	Destinations	Notes
Douglas	Castle Rock	0.0	0.0	I-25 / US 85 / US 87 – Littleton, Colorado Springs, Denver	Western terminus; I-25/US 87 exit 184
Douglas	Franktown	8.0	12.9	SH 83 – Colorado Springs, Parker	
Elbert		61.5	99.0	I-70 / US 40 – Denver, Limon	Eastern terminus; I-70/US 40, exit 352
1.000 mi = 1.609 km; 1.000 km = 0.621 mi
