= Kiowa, Colorado =

Town in Colorado, United States

- Home rule municipality
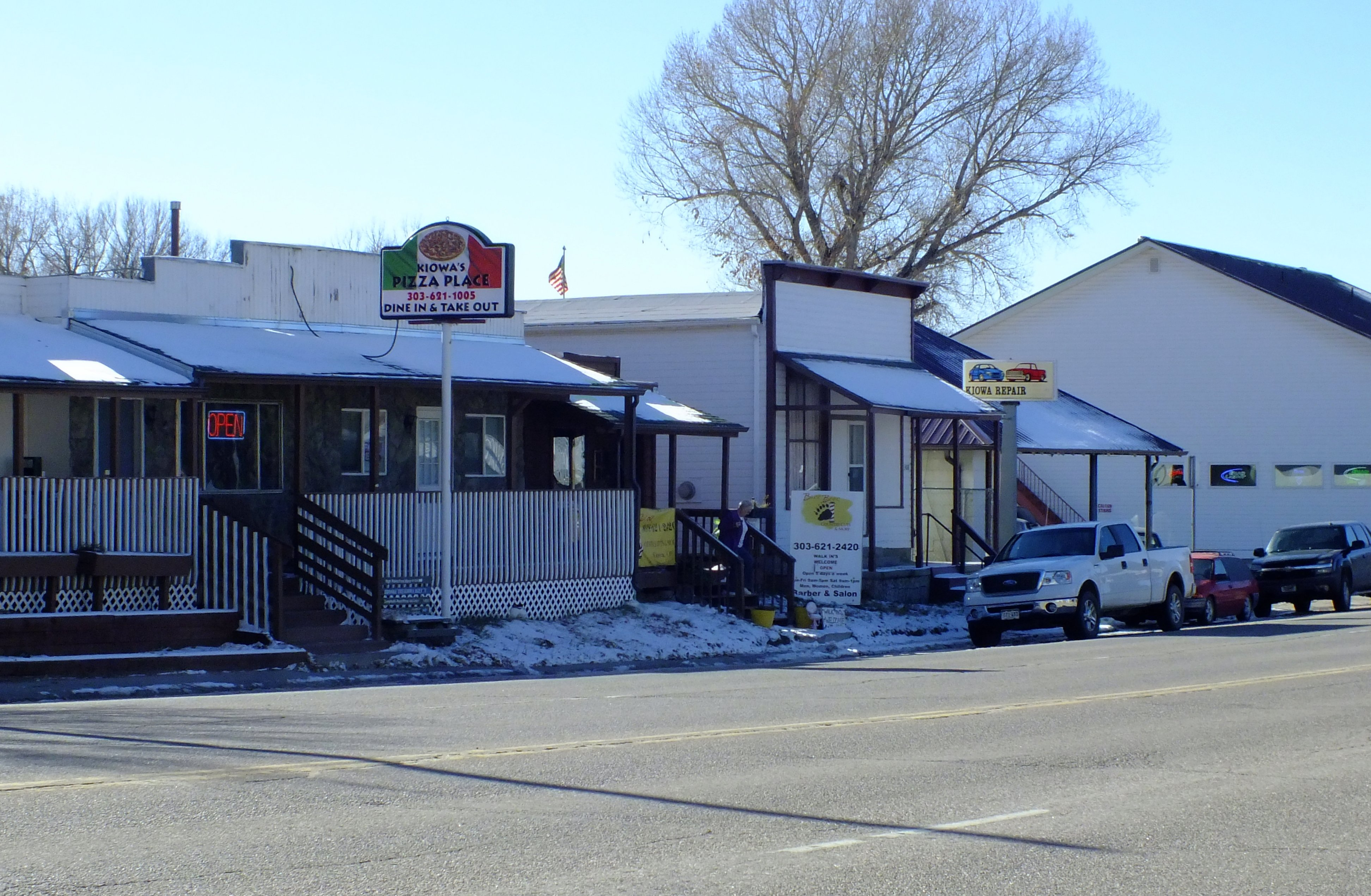
- Kiowa, Colorado

- Location of Kiowa in Elbert County, Colorado.
- Coordinates: 39°20′39″N 104°27′46″W
- Country: United States
- State: Colorado
- County: Elbert
- Incorporated: December 30, 1912

Government
  - Type: Home Rule Municipality

Area
  - Total: 0.86 sq mi (2.23 km^{2})
  - Land: 0.86 sq mi (2.23 km^{2})
  - Water: 0 sq mi (0.00 km^{2})
- Elevation: 6,378 ft (1,944 m)

Population (2020)
  - Total: 725
  - Density: 842/sq mi (325/km^{2})
- Time zone: UTC-7 (MST)
  - Summer (DST): UTC-6 (MDT)
- ZIP code: 80117
- Area codes: Both 303 and 720
- GNIS feature ID: 2412838
- FIPS code: 08-40790
- Website: Official website

Kiowa is a home rule municipality town in and the county seat of Elbert County, Colorado, United States. The town population was 725 at the 2020 United States census.

== History ==
The town was named for the Kiowa people. Settled in 1859, it was originally named "Wendling" after an early settler. It was called "Middle Kiowa" from the 1860s until 1912, when it was incorporated and the word "Middle" was dropped. It became the county seat of Elbert County in 1874. Kiowa suffered from major flooding in 1935.

== Geography ==
Kiowa is located in western Elbert County on the east side of Kiowa Creek, a north-flowing tributary of the South Platte River. Colorado State Highway 86 passes through the town, leading east 44 miles (71 km) to Limon and west 23 miles (37 km) to Castle Rock. The town of Elizabeth is 7 miles (11 km) west on SH 86.

According to the United States Census Bureau, Kiowa has a total area of 0.89 square miles (2.3 km^{2}), all of it land.

== Demographics ==
Historical population
Census	Pop.	Note	%±
1920	148		—
1930	185		25.0%
1940	195		5.4%
1950	173		−11.3%
1960	195		12.7%
1970	235		20.5%
1980	206		−12.3%
1990	275		33.5%
2000	581		111.3%
2010	723		24.4%
2020	725		0.3%
U.S. Decennial Census

== Education ==
It is in the Kiowa School District C-2.

== See also ==
- Colorado municipalities
