= List of Colorado municipalities by county =

Coordinates: 38.9972°N 105.5478°W

The 64 counties of the U.S. State of Colorado

See also the Alphabetical list of municipalities in Colorado.

The following sortable table lists each of the 64 counties of the State of Colorado ranked by population at the 2020 United States Census, with each of the active municipalities within each county ranked by population within that county. Colorado has 272 active municipalities, comprising 197 towns, 73 cities, and two consolidated city and county governments. (Note: 1. At the 2000 United States Census, the State of Colorado had 269 active municipalities, comprising 196 towns, 72 cities, and one consolidated city and county government.; 2. On February 7, 2001, the City of Centennial was incorporated.; 3. On November 15, 2001, the City of Broomfield became the City and County of Broomfield, increasing the number of Colorado counties to 64.; 4. On June 30, 2004, the Town of Watkins was incorporated, but on November 30, 2006, the Town of Watkins was dissolved.; 5. On November 6, 2007, the City of Castle Pines North was incorporated.; 6. Thus, at the 2010 United States Census, the State of Colorado had 271 active municipalities, comprising 196 towns, 73 cities, and two consolidated city and county governments.; 7. On November 2, 2010, the City of Castle Pines North changed its name to the City of Castle Pines.; 8. On November 4, 2014, the property owners of Carbonate, Colorado, voted to reactivate the Town of Carbonate.; 9. Thus, at the 2020 United States Census, the State of Colorado had 272 active municipalities, comprising 197 towns, 73 cities, and two consolidated city and county governments.; 10. On April 3, 2023, the Town of Keystone was incorporated.; 11. On November 7, 2023, voters approved a Home Rule Charter for the Town of Erie.; 12. On July 28, 2026, the Town of Hartman was declared abandoned.; 13. Thus, the State of Colorado continues to have 272 active municipalities, comprising 197 towns, 73 cities, and two consolidated city and county governments.)

At the 2020 Census, the 272 active Colorado municipalities had a total of 4,299,942 residents, or 74.57% of the total state population of 5,773,714. Since the 2020 Census, the Town of Keystone in Summit County was incorporated on February 8, 2024, and the Town of Hartman in Prowers County was declared abandoned on July 28, 2026.

== Table ==
For the most recent population data, see the List of Colorado municipalities by population.
Select the OpenStreetMap link at the right to view the location of these municipalities.
For the official municipal boundaries map, see the Colorado municipal boundaries map.

County seat
State capital

The 272 active municipalities of the U.S. State of Colorado sorted by county 2020
County				Municipality				County location (Note: A map showing the location of the county within the State of Colorado.)
2020 rank (Note: The rank of the county within the state by population as of April 1, 2020, as enumerated by the 2020 United States Census.)	County name (Note: The official name of the county.)	2020 population (Note: The county population as of July 1, 2018, as enumerated by the 2020 United States Census.)	% of state (Note: The county population as a percentage of the Colorado state population as of April 1, 2020, as enumerated by the 2020 United States Census.)	2020 rank (Note: The rank of the municipality within the county by population within the county as of April 1, 2020, as enumerated by the 2020 United States Census.)	Municipal name (Note: The official name of the municipality. Each county seat is shown in green, and the state capital is shown in red. If the municipality extends beyond the county, the percentage of the municipal population that resides within the county is shown.)	2020 population (Note: The municipal population within the county as of April 1, 2020, as enumerated by the 2020 United States Census.)	% of county (Note: The municipal population within the county as a percentage of the county population as of April 1, 2020, as enumerated by the 2020 United States Census.)	County location
1	El Paso County	730,395	12.65%	1	City of Colorado Springs	478,961	65.58%	
1	El Paso County	730,395	12.65%	2	City of Fountain	29,802	4.08%	
1	El Paso County	730,395	12.65%	3	Town of Monument	10,399	1.42%	
1	El Paso County	730,395	12.65%	4	City of Manitou Springs	4,858	0.67%	
1	El Paso County	730,395	12.65%	5	Town of Palmer Lake	2,636	0.36%	
1	El Paso County	730,395	12.65%	6	Town of Calhan	762	0.10%	
1	El Paso County	730,395	12.65%	7	Town of Green Mountain Falls (96%)	622	0.09%	
1	El Paso County	730,395	12.65%	8	Town of Ramah	111	0.02%	
1	El Paso County	730,395	12.65%		Unincorporated El Paso County	202,244	27.69%	
2	City and County of Denver	715,522	12.39%	1	City and County of Denver	715,522	100.00%	
3	Arapahoe County	655,070	11.35%	1	City of Aurora (87%)	336,035	51.30%	
3	Arapahoe County	655,070	11.35%	2	City of Centennial	108,418	16.55%	
3	Arapahoe County	655,070	11.35%	3	City of Littleton (94%)	42,702	6.52%	
3	Arapahoe County	655,070	11.35%	4	City of Englewood	33,659	5.14%	
3	Arapahoe County	655,070	11.35%	5	City of Greenwood Village	15,691	2.40%	
3	Arapahoe County	655,070	11.35%	6	City of Cherry Hills Village	6,442	0.98%	
3	Arapahoe County	655,070	11.35%	7	City of Sheridan	6,105	0.93%	
3	Arapahoe County	655,070	11.35%	8	City of Glendale	4,613	0.70%	
3	Arapahoe County	655,070	11.35%	9	Town of Bennett (15%)	2,443	0.47%	
3	Arapahoe County	655,070	11.35%	10	Town of Columbine Valley	1,502	0.23%	
3	Arapahoe County	655,070	11.35%	11	Town of Deer Trail	1,068	0.16%	
3	Arapahoe County	655,070	11.35%	12	Town of Foxfield	754	0.12%	
3	Arapahoe County	655,070	11.35%	13	Town of Bow Mar (69%)	587	0.10%	
3	Arapahoe County	655,070	11.35%		Unincorporated Arapahoe County	95,051	14.51%	
4	Jefferson County	582,910	10.10%	1	City of Lakewood	155,984	26.76%	
4	Jefferson County	582,910	10.10%	2	City of Arvada (98%)	121,510	20.85%	
4	Jefferson County	582,910	10.10%	3	City of Westminster (39%)	45,077	7.73%	
4	Jefferson County	582,910	10.10%	4	City of Wheat Ridge	32,398	5.56%	
4	Jefferson County	582,910	10.10%	5	City of Golden	20,399	3.50%	
4	Jefferson County	582,910	10.10%	6	City of Edgewater	5,005	0.86%	
4	Jefferson County	582,910	10.10%	7	City of Littleton (5%)	2,310	0.40%	
4	Jefferson County	582,910	10.10%	8	Town of Mountain View	541	0.09%	
4	Jefferson County	582,910	10.10%	9	Town of Morrison	396	0.07%	
4	Jefferson County	582,910	10.10%	10	Town of Bow Mar (31%)	266	0.05%	
4	Jefferson County	582,910	10.10%	11	Town of Lakeside	16	<0.01%	
4	Jefferson County	582,910	10.10%	12	Town of Superior (0%)	0	0%	
4	Jefferson County	582,910	10.10%		Unincorporated Jefferson County	199,008	34.14%	
5	Adams County	519,572	9.00%	1	City of Thornton (100%)	141,867	27.30%	
5	Adams County	519,572	9.00%	2	City of Westminster (61%)	71,240	13.71%	
5	Adams County	519,572	9.00%	3	City of Commerce City	62,418	12.01%	
5	Adams County	519,572	9.00%	4	City of Aurora (12%)	47,720	9.18%	
5	Adams County	519,572	9.00%	5	City of Brighton (99%)	39,718	7.64%	
5	Adams County	519,572	9.00%	6	City of Northglenn (99.9%)	38,106	7.33%	
5	Adams County	519,572	9.00%	7	City of Federal Heights	14,382	2.77%	
5	Adams County	519,572	9.00%	8	City of Arvada (2%)	2,892	0.56%	
5	Adams County	519,572	9.00%	9	Town of Bennett (85%)	2,443	0.47%	
5	Adams County	519,572	9.00%	10	Town of Lochbuie (0.01%)	1	<0.01%	
5	Adams County	519,572	9.00%		Unincorporated Adams County	98,785	19.01%	
6	Larimer County	359,066	6.22%	1	City of Fort Collins	169,810	47.29%	
6	Larimer County	359,066	6.22%	2	City of Loveland	76,378	21.27%	
6	Larimer County	359,066	6.22%	3	Town of Wellington	11,047	3.08%	
6	Larimer County	359,066	6.22%	4	Town of Berthoud (97%)	10,071	2.80%	
6	Larimer County	359,066	6.22%	5	Town of Windsor (24%)	7,719	2.15%	
6	Larimer County	359,066	6.22%	6	Town of Timnath (99.9%)	6,487	1.81%	
6	Larimer County	359,066	6.22%	7	Town of Estes Park	5,904	1.64%	
6	Larimer County	359,066	6.22%	8	Town of Johnstown (27%)	4,756	0.32%	
6	Larimer County	359,066	6.22%		Unincorporated Larimer County	66,894	18.63%	
7	Douglas County	357,978	6.20%	1	Town of Castle Rock	73,158	20.44%	
7	Douglas County	357,978	6.20%	2	Town of Parker	58,512	16.35%	
7	Douglas County	357,978	6.20%	3	City of Lone Tree	14,253	3.98%	
7	Douglas County	357,978	6.20%	4	City of Castle Pines	11,036	3.08%	
7	Douglas County	357,978	6.20%	5	City of Aurora (1%)	2,506	0.70%	
7	Douglas County	357,978	6.20%	6	City of Littleton (1%)	640	0.18%	
7	Douglas County	357,978	6.20%	7	Town of Larkspur	206	0.06%	
7	Douglas County	357,978	6.20%		Unincorporated Douglas County	197,667	55.22%	
8	Boulder County	330,758	5.73%	1	City of Boulder	108,250	32.73%	
8	Boulder County	330,758	5.73%	2	City of Longmont (99%)	97,587	29.50%	
8	Boulder County	330,758	5.73%	3	City of Lafayette	30,411	9.19%	
8	Boulder County	330,758	5.73%	4	City of Louisville	21,226	6.42%	
8	Boulder County	330,758	5.73%	5	Town of Superior (100%)	13,094	3.96%	
8	Boulder County	330,758	5.73%	6	Town of Erie (42%)	12,651	3.82%	
8	Boulder County	330,758	5.73%	7	Town of Lyons	2,209	0.67%	
8	Boulder County	330,758	5.73%	8	Town of Nederland	1,471	0.44%	
8	Boulder County	330,758	5.73%	9	Town of Jamestown	256	0.08%	
8	Boulder County	330,758	5.73%	10	Town of Ward	128	0.04%	
8	Boulder County	330,758	5.73%		Unincorporated Boulder County	43,475	13.14%	
9	Weld County	328,981	5.70%	1	City of Greeley	108,795	33.07%	
9	Weld County	328,981	5.70%	2	Town of Windsor (76%)	24,997	7.60%	
9	Weld County	328,981	5.70%	3	City of Evans	22,165	6.74%	
9	Weld County	328,981	5.70%	4	Town of Erie (58%)	17,387	5.29%	
9	Weld County	328,981	5.70%	5	Town of Firestone	16,381	4.98%	
9	Weld County	328,981	5.70%	6	Town of Frederick	14,513	4.41%	
9	Weld County	328,981	5.70%	7	Town of Johnstown (73%)	12,547	3.81%	
9	Weld County	328,981	5.70%	8	Town of Milliken	8,386	2.55%	
9	Weld County	328,981	5.70%	9	Town of Lochbuie (99.99%)	8,087	2.46%	
9	Weld County	328,981	5.70%	10	City of Fort Lupton	7,955	2.42%	
9	Weld County	328,981	5.70%	11	Town of Severance	7,683	2.34%	
9	Weld County	328,981	5.70%	12	City of Dacono	6,297	1.91%	
9	Weld County	328,981	5.70%	13	Town of Eaton	5,802	1.76%	
9	Weld County	328,981	5.70%	14	Town of Mead	4,781	1.45%	
9	Weld County	328,981	5.70%	15	Town of Platteville	2,955	0.90%	
9	Weld County	328,981	5.70%	16	Town of LaSalle	2,359	0.72%	
9	Weld County	328,981	5.70%	17	Town of Ault	1,887	0.57%	
9	Weld County	328,981	5.70%	18	Town of Hudson	1,651	0.50%	
9	Weld County	328,981	5.70%	19	Town of Kersey	1,495	0.45%	
9	Weld County	328,981	5.70%	20	City of Longmont (1%)	1,298	0.39%	
9	Weld County	328,981	5.70%	21	Town of Keenesburg	1,250	0.38%	
9	Weld County	328,981	5.70%	22	Town of Pierce	1,097	0.33%	
9	Weld County	328,981	5.70%	23	Town of Gilcrest	1,029	0.31%	
9	Weld County	328,981	5.70%	24	Town of Nunn	504	0.15%	
9	Weld County	328,981	5.70%	25	City of Brighton (1%)	365	0.11%	
9	Weld County	328,981	5.70%	26	Town of Berthoud (3%)	261	0.08%	
9	Weld County	328,981	5.70%	27	Town of Garden City	254	0.08%	
9	Weld County	328,981	5.70%	28	Town of Grover	157	0.05%	
9	Weld County	328,981	5.70%	29	Town of Raymer	110	0.03%	
9	Weld County	328,981	5.70%	30	City of Northglenn (0.1%)	25	0.01%	
9	Weld County	328,981	5.70%	31	Town of Timnath (0.1%)	5	<0.01%	
9	Weld County	328,981	5.70%	32	City of Thornton (0%)	0	0%	
9	Weld County	328,981	5.70%		Unincorporated Weld County	46,503	14.14%	
10	Pueblo County	168,162	2.91%	1	City of Pueblo	111,876	66.53%	
10	Pueblo County	168,162	2.91%	2	Town of Boone	305	0.18%	
10	Pueblo County	168,162	2.91%	3	Town of Rye	206	0.12%	
10	Pueblo County	168,162	2.91%		Unincorporated Pueblo County	55,775	33.17%	
11	Mesa County	155,703	2.70%	1	City of Grand Junction	65,560	42.11%	
11	Mesa County	155,703	2.70%	2	City of Fruita	13,395	8.60%	
11	Mesa County	155,703	2.70%	3	Town of Palisade	2,565	1.65%	
11	Mesa County	155,703	2.70%	4	Town of De Beque	493	0.32%	
11	Mesa County	155,703	2.70%	5	Town of Collbran	369	0.24%	
11	Mesa County	155,703	2.70%		Unincorporated Mesa County	73,321	47.09%	
12	City and County of Broomfield	74,112	1.28%	1	City and County of Broomfield	74,112	100.00%	
13	Garfield County	61,685	1.07%	1	City of Rifle	10,437	16.92%	
13	Garfield County	61,685	1.07%	2	City of Glenwood Springs	9,963	16.15%	
13	Garfield County	61,685	1.07%	3	Town of Carbondale	6,434	10.43%	
13	Garfield County	61,685	1.07%	4	Town of New Castle	4,923	7.98%	
13	Garfield County	61,685	1.07%	5	Town of Silt	3,536	5.73%	
13	Garfield County	61,685	1.07%	6	Town of Parachute	1,390	2.25%	
13	Garfield County	61,685	1.07%	7	Town of Carbonate	0	0.00%	
13	Garfield County	61,685	1.07%		Unincorporated Garfield County	25,002	40.53%	
14	Eagle County	55,731	0.97%	1	Town of Gypsum	8,040	14.43%	
14	Eagle County	55,731	0.97%	2	Town of Eagle	7,511	13.48%	
14	Eagle County	55,731	0.97%	3	Town of Avon	6,072	10.90%	
14	Eagle County	55,731	0.97%	4	Town of Vail	4,835	8.68%	
14	Eagle County	55,731	0.97%	5	Town of Basalt (73%)	2,917	5.23%	
14	Eagle County	55,731	0.97%	6	Town of Minturn	1,033	1.85%	
14	Eagle County	55,731	0.97%	7	Town of Red Cliff	257	0.46%	
14	Eagle County	55,731	0.97%		Unincorporated Eagle County	25,066	44.98%	
15	La Plata County	55,638	0.96%	1	City of Durango	19,071	34.28%	
15	La Plata County	55,638	0.96%	2	Town of Bayfield	2,838	5.10%	
15	La Plata County	55,638	0.96%	3	Town of Ignacio	852	1.53%	
15	La Plata County	55,638	0.96%		Unincorporated La Plata County	32,877	59.09%	
16	Fremont County	48,939	0.85%	1	City of Cañon City	17,141	35.03%	
16	Fremont County	48,939	0.85%	2	City of Florence	3,822	7.81%	
16	Fremont County	48,939	0.85%	3	Town of Williamsburg	731	1.49%	
16	Fremont County	48,939	0.85%	4	Town of Rockvale	511	1.04%	
16	Fremont County	48,939	0.85%	5	Town of Coal Creek	364	0.74%	
16	Fremont County	48,939	0.85%	6	Town of Brookside	236	0.48%	
16	Fremont County	48,939	0.85%		Unincorporated Fremont County	26,134	53.40%	
17	Montrose County	42,679	0.74%	1	City of Montrose	20,291	47.54%	
17	Montrose County	42,679	0.74%	2	Town of Olathe	2,019	4.73%	
17	Montrose County	42,679	0.74%	3	Town of Nucla	585	1.37%	
17	Montrose County	42,679	0.74%	4	Town of Naturita	485	1.14%	
17	Montrose County	42,679	0.74%		Unincorporated Montrose County	19,299	45.22%	
18	Delta County	31,196	0.54%	1	City of Delta	9,035	28.96%	
18	Delta County	31,196	0.54%	2	Town of Orchard City	3,142	10.07%	
18	Delta County	31,196	0.54%	3	Town of Cedaredge	2,279	7.31%	
18	Delta County	31,196	0.54%	4	Town of Paonia	1,447	4.64%	
18	Delta County	31,196	0.54%	5	Town of Hotchkiss	875	2.80%	
18	Delta County	31,196	0.54%	6	Town of Crawford	403	1.29%	
18	Delta County	31,196	0.54%		Unincorporated Delta County	14,015	44.93%	
19	Summit County (Note: The Town of Keystone in Summit Couty was incorporated on April 3, 2023.)	31,055	0.54%	1	Town of Breckenridge	5,078	16.35%	
19	Summit County	31,055	0.54%	2	Town of Silverthorne	4,402	14.17%	
19	Summit County	31,055	0.54%	3	Town of Frisco	2,913	9.38%	
19	Summit County	31,055	0.54%	4	Town of Keystone	1,369	4.41%	
19	Summit County	31,055	0.54%	5	Town of Dillon	1,064	3.43%	
19	Summit County	31,055	0.54%	6	Town of Blue River	877	2.82%	
19	Summit County	31,055	0.54%	7	Town of Montezuma	74	0.24%	
19	Summit County	31,055	0.54%		Unincorporated Summit County	15,278	49.20%	
20	Morgan County	29,111	0.50%	1	City of Fort Morgan	11,597	39.84%	
20	Morgan County	29,111	0.50%	2	City of Brush	5,339	18.34%	
20	Morgan County	29,111	0.50%	3	Town of Wiggins	1,401	4.81%	
20	Morgan County	29,111	0.50%	4	Town of Log Lane Village	913	3.14%	
20	Morgan County	29,111	0.50%	5	Town of Hillrose	312	1.07%	
20	Morgan County	29,111	0.50%		Unincorporated Morgan County	9,549	32.80%	
21	Elbert County	26,062	0.45%	1	Town of Elizabeth	1,675	6.43%	
21	Elbert County	26,062	0.45%	2	Town of Kiowa	725	2.78%	
21	Elbert County	26,062	0.45%	3	Town of Simla	601	2.31%	
21	Elbert County	26,062	0.45%		Unincorporated Elbert County	23,061	88.49%	
22	Montezuma County	25,849	0.45%	1	City of Cortez	8,766	33.91%	
22	Montezuma County	25,849	0.45%	2	Town of Mancos	1,196	4.63%	
22	Montezuma County	25,849	0.45%	3	Town of Dolores	885	3.42%	
22	Montezuma County	25,849	0.45%		Unincorporated Montezuma County	15,002	58.04%	
23	Routt County	24,829	0.43%	1	City of Steamboat Springs	13,224	53.26%	
23	Routt County	24,829	0.43%	2	Town of Hayden	1,941	7.82%	
23	Routt County	24,829	0.43%	3	Town of Oak Creek	889	3.58%	
23	Routt County	24,829	0.43%	4	Town of Yampa	399	1.61%	
23	Routt County	24,829	0.43%		Unincorporated Routt County	8,376	33.73%	
24	Teller County	24,710	0.43%	1	City of Woodland Park	7,920	32.05%	
24	Teller County	24,710	0.43%	2	City of Cripple Creek	1,155	4.67%	
24	Teller County	24,710	0.43%	3	City of Victor	379	1.53%	
24	Teller County	24,710	0.43%	4	Town of Green Mountain Falls (4%)	24	0.10%	
24	Teller County	24,710	0.43%		Unincorporated Teller County	15,232	61.64%	
25	Logan County	21,528	0.37%	1	City of Sterling	13,735	63.80%	
25	Logan County	21,528	0.37%	2	Town of Fleming	428	1.99%	
25	Logan County	21,528	0.37%	3	Town of Merino	281	1.31%	
25	Logan County	21,528	0.37%	4	Town of Iliff	246	1.14%	
25	Logan County	21,528	0.37%	5	Town of Peetz	213	0.99%	
25	Logan County	21,528	0.37%	6	Town of Crook	133	0.62%	
25	Logan County	21,528	0.37%		Unincorporated Logan County	6,492	30.16%	
26	Chaffee County	19,476	0.34%	1	City of Salida	5,666	29.09%	
26	Chaffee County	19,476	0.34%	2	Town of Buena Vista	2,855	14.66%	
26	Chaffee County	19,476	0.34%	3	Town of Poncha Springs	925	4.75%	
26	Chaffee County	19,476	0.34%		Unincorporated Chaffee County	10,030	51.50%	
27	Otero County	18,690	0.32%	1	City of La Junta	7,322	39.18%	
27	Otero County	18,690	0.32%	2	City of Rocky Ford	3,876	20.74%	
27	Otero County	18,690	0.32%	3	Town of Fowler	1,253	6.70%	
27	Otero County	18,690	0.32%	4	Town of Swink	604	3.23%	
27	Otero County	18,690	0.32%	5	Town of Manzanola	341	1.82%	
27	Otero County	18,690	0.32%	6	Town of Cheraw	237	1.27%	
27	Otero County	18,690	0.32%		Unincorporated Otero County	5,057	27.06%	
28	Park County	17,390	0.30%	1	Town of Fairplay	724	4.16%	
28	Park County	17,390	0.30%	2	Town of Alma	296	1.70%	
28	Park County	17,390	0.30%		Unincorporated Park County	16,370	94.13%	
29	Pitkin County	17,358	0.30%	1	City of Aspen	7,004	40.35%	
29	Pitkin County	17,358	0.30%	2	Town of Snowmass Village	3,096	17.84%	
29	Pitkin County	17,358	0.30%	3	Town of Basalt (27%)	1,067	6.15%	
29	Pitkin County	17,358	0.30%		Unincorporated Pitkin County	6,191	35.67%	
30	Gunnison County	16,918	0.29%	1	City of Gunnison	6,560	38.78%	
30	Gunnison County	16,918	0.29%	2	Town of Crested Butte	1,639	9.69%	
30	Gunnison County	16,918	0.29%	3	Town of Mount Crested Butte	941	5.56%	
30	Gunnison County	16,918	0.29%	4	Town of Marble	133	0.79%	
30	Gunnison County	16,918	0.29%	5	Town of Pitkin	72	0.43%	
30	Gunnison County	16,918	0.29%		Unincorporated Gunnison County	7,573	44.76%	
31	Alamosa County	16,376	0.28%	1	City of Alamosa	9,806	59.88%	
31	Alamosa County	16,376	0.28%	2	Town of Hooper	81	0.49%	
31	Alamosa County	16,376	0.28%		Unincorporated Alamosa County	6,489	39.63%	
32	Grand County	15,717	0.27%	1	Town of Granby	2,079	13.23%	
32	Grand County	15,717	0.27%	2	Town of Kremmling	1,509	9.60%	
32	Grand County	15,717	0.27%	3	Town of Fraser	1,400	8.91%	
32	Grand County	15,717	0.27%	4	Town of Winter Park	1,033	6.57%	
32	Grand County	15,717	0.27%	5	Town of Hot Sulphur Springs	687	4.37%	
32	Grand County	15,717	0.27%	6	Town of Grand Lake	410	2.61%	
32	Grand County	15,717	0.27%		Unincorporated Grand County	8,599	54.71%	
33	Las Animas County	14,555	0.25%	1	City of Trinidad	8,329	57.22%	
33	Las Animas County	14,555	0.25%	2	Town of Aguilar	456	3.13%	
33	Las Animas County	14,555	0.25%	3	Town of Cokedale	127	0.87%	
33	Las Animas County	14,555	0.25%	4	Town of Kim	63	0.43%	
33	Las Animas County	14,555	0.25%	5	Town of Starkville	62	0.43%	
33	Las Animas County	14,555	0.25%	6	Town of Branson	57	0.39%	
33	Las Animas County	14,555	0.25%		Unincorporated Las Animas County	5,461	37.52%	
34	Archuleta County	13,359	0.23%	1	Town of Pagosa Springs	1,571	11.76%	
34	Archuleta County	13,359	0.23%		Unincorporated Archuleta County	11,788	88.24%	
35	Moffat County	13,292	0.23%	1	City of Craig	9,060	68.16%	
35	Moffat County	13,292	0.23%	2	Town of Dinosaur	243	1.83%	
35	Moffat County	13,292	0.23%		Unincorporated Moffat County	3,989	30.01%	
36	Prowers County	11,999	0.21%	1	City of Lamar	7,687	64.06%	
36	Prowers County	11,999	0.21%	2	Town of Holly	837	6.98%	
36	Prowers County	11,999	0.21%	3	Town of Granada	445	3.71%	
36	Prowers County	11,999	0.21%	4	Town of Wiley	437	3.64%	
36	Prowers County	11,999	0.21%	5	Town of Hartman (Note: On July 28, 2026, the Colorado Secretary of State declared that the Town of Hartman in Prowers County had been abandoned pursuant to 31-3-201 C.R.S.)	56	0.47%	
36	Prowers County	11,999	0.21%		Unincorporated Prowers County	2,537	21.14%	
37	Rio Grande County	11,539	0.20%	1	City of Monte Vista	4,247	36.81%	
37	Rio Grande County	11,539	0.20%	2	Town of Del Norte	1,458	12.64%	
37	Rio Grande County	11,539	0.20%	3	Town of South Fork	510	4.42%	
37	Rio Grande County	11,539	0.20%	4	Town of Center (2%)	44	0.38%	
37	Rio Grande County	11,539	0.20%		Unincorporated Rio Grande County	5,280	45.76%	
38	Yuma County	9,988	0.17%	1	Town of Yuma	3,456	34.60%	
38	Yuma County	9,988	0.17%	2	City of Wray	2,358	23.61%	
38	Yuma County	9,988	0.17%	3	Town of Eckley	232	2.32%	
38	Yuma County	9,988	0.17%		Unincorporated Yuma County	3,942	39.47%	
39	Clear Creek County	9,397	0.16%	1	City of Idaho Springs	1,782	18.96%	
39	Clear Creek County	9,397	0.16%	2	Town of Georgetown	1,118	11.90%	
39	Clear Creek County	9,397	0.16%	3	Town of Empire	345	3.67%	
39	Clear Creek County	9,397	0.16%	4	Town of Silver Plume	207	2.20%	
39	Clear Creek County	9,397	0.16%	5	City of Central (0%)	0	0%	
39	Clear Creek County	9,397	0.16%		Unincorporated Clear Creek County	5,945	63.26%	
40	San Miguel County	8,072	0.14%	1	Town of Telluride	2,607	32.30%	
40	San Miguel County	8,072	0.14%	2	Town of Mountain Village	1,264	15.66%	
40	San Miguel County	8,072	0.14%	3	Town of Norwood	535	6.63%	
40	San Miguel County	8,072	0.14%	4	Town of Ophir	197	2.44%	
40	San Miguel County	8,072	0.14%	5	Town of Sawpit	38	0.47%	
40	San Miguel County	8,072	0.14%		Unincorporated San Miguel County	3,431	42.50%	
41	Conejos County	7,461	0.13%	1	Town of Manassa	947	12.69%	
41	Conejos County	7,461	0.13%	2	Town of Sanford	879	11.78%	
41	Conejos County	7,461	0.13%	3	Town of La Jara	730	9.78%	
41	Conejos County	7,461	0.13%	4	Town of Antonito	647	8.67%	
41	Conejos County	7,461	0.13%	5	Town of Romeo	302	4.05%	
41	Conejos County	7,461	0.13%		Unincorporated Conejos County (Note: The county seat of Conejos County is the unincorporated community of Conejos.)	3,956	53.02%	
42	Lake County	7,436	0.13%	1	City of Leadville	2,633	35.41%	
42	Lake County	7,436	0.13%		Unincorporated Lake County	4,803	64.59%	
43	Kit Carson County	7,087	0.12%	1	City of Burlington	3,172	44.76%	
43	Kit Carson County	7,087	0.12%	2	Town of Stratton	656	9.26%	
43	Kit Carson County	7,087	0.12%	3	Town of Flagler	567	8.00%	
43	Kit Carson County	7,087	0.12%	4	Town of Bethune	183	2.58%	
43	Kit Carson County	7,087	0.12%	5	Town of Seibert	172	2.43%	
43	Kit Carson County	7,087	0.12%	6	Town of Vona	95	1.34%	
43	Kit Carson County	7,087	0.12%		Unincorporated Kit Carson County	2,242	31.64%	
44	Huerfano County	6,820	0.12%	1	City of Walsenburg	3,049	44.71%	
44	Huerfano County	6,820	0.12%	2	Town of La Veta	862	12.64%	
44	Huerfano County	6,820	0.12%		Unincorporated Huerfano County	2,909	42.65%	
45	Rio Blanco County	6,529	0.11%	1	Town of Meeker	2,374	36.36%	
45	Rio Blanco County	6,529	0.11%	2	Town of Rangely	2,299	35.21%	
45	Rio Blanco County	6,529	0.11%		Unincorporated Rio Blanco County	1,856	28.43%	
46	Saguache County	6,368	0.11%	1	Town of Center (98%)	1,885	29.60%	
46	Saguache County	6,368	0.11%	2	Town of Saguache	539	8.46%	
46	Saguache County	6,368	0.11%	3	Town of Crestone	141	2.21%	
46	Saguache County	6,368	0.11%	4	Town of Moffat	108	1.70%	
46	Saguache County	6,368	0.11%	5	Town of Bonanza	17	0.27%	
46	Saguache County	6,368	0.11%		Unincorporated Saguache County	3,678	57.76%	
47	Crowley County	5,922	0.10%	1	Town of Ordway	1,066	18.00%	
47	Crowley County	5,922	0.10%	2	Town of Olney Springs	315	5.32%	
47	Crowley County	5,922	0.10%	3	Town of Sugar City	259	4.37%	
47	Crowley County	5,922	0.10%	4	Town of Crowley	166	2.80%	
47	Crowley County	5,922	0.10%		Unincorporated Crowley County	4,116	69.50%	
48	Gilpin County	5,808	0.10%	1	City of Central (100%)	779	13.41%	
48	Gilpin County	5,808	0.10%	2	City of Black Hawk	127	2.19%	
48	Gilpin County	5,808	0.10%		Unincorporated Gilpin County	4,902	84.40%	
49	Lincoln County	5,675	0.10%	1	Town of Limon	2,043	36.00%	
49	Lincoln County	5,675	0.10%	2	Town of Hugo	787	13.87%	
49	Lincoln County	5,675	0.10%	3	Town of Arriba	202	3.56%	
49	Lincoln County	5,675	0.10%	4	Town of Genoa	153	2.70%	
49	Lincoln County	5,675	0.10%		Unincorporated Lincoln County	2,490	43.88%	
50	Bent County	5,650	0.10%	1	City of Las Animas	2,300	40.71%	
50	Bent County	5,650	0.10%		Unincorporated Bent County	3,350	59.29%	
51	Ouray County	4,874	0.08%	1	Town of Ridgway	1,183	24.27%	
51	Ouray County	4,874	0.08%	2	City of Ouray	898	18.42%	
51	Ouray County	4,874	0.08%		Unincorporated Ouray County	2,793	57.30%	
52	Washington County	4,817	0.08%	1	Town of Akron	1,757	36.47%	
52	Washington County	4,817	0.08%	2	Town of Otis	511	10.61%	
52	Washington County	4,817	0.08%		Unincorporated Washington County	2,549	52.92%	
53	Custer County	4,704	0.08%	1	Town of Silver Cliff	609	12.95%	
53	Custer County	4,704	0.08%	2	Town of Westcliffe	435	9.25%	
53	Custer County	4,704	0.08%		Unincorporated Custer County	3,660	77.81%	
54	Phillips County	4,530	0.08%	1	City of Holyoke	2,346	51.79%	
54	Phillips County	4,530	0.08%	2	Town of Haxtun	981	21.66%	
54	Phillips County	4,530	0.08%	3	Town of Paoli	51	1.13%	
54	Phillips County	4,530	0.08%		Unincorporated Phillips County	1,152	25.43%	
55	Baca County	3,506	0.06%	1	Town of Springfield	1,325	37.79%	
55	Baca County	3,506	0.06%	2	Town of Walsh	543	15.49%	
55	Baca County	3,506	0.06%	3	Town of Pritchett	112	3.19%	
55	Baca County	3,506	0.06%	4	Town of Campo	103	2.94%	
55	Baca County	3,506	0.06%	5	Town of Vilas	98	2.80%	
55	Baca County	3,506	0.06%	6	Town of Two Buttes	34	0.97%	
55	Baca County	3,506	0.06%		Unincorporated Baca County	1,291	36.82%	
56	Costilla County	3,499	0.06%	1	Town of San Luis	598	17.09%	
56	Costilla County	3,499	0.06%	2	Town of Blanca	322	9.20%	
56	Costilla County	3,499	0.06%		Unincorporated Costilla County	2,579	73.71%	
57	Sedgwick County	2,404	0.04%	1	Town of Julesburg	1,307	54.37%	
57	Sedgwick County	2,404	0.04%	2	Town of Ovid	271	11.27%	
57	Sedgwick County	2,404	0.04%	3	Town of Sedgwick	172	7.15%	
57	Sedgwick County	2,404	0.04%		Unincorporated Sedgwick County	654	27.20%	
58	Dolores County	2,326	0.04%	1	Town of Dove Creek	635	27.30%	
58	Dolores County	2,326	0.04%	2	Town of Rico	288	12.38%	
58	Dolores County	2,326	0.04%		Unincorporated Dolores County	1,403	60.32%	
59	Cheyenne County	1,748	0.03%	1	Town of Cheyenne Wells	758	43.36%	
59	Cheyenne County	1,748	0.03%	2	Town of Kit Carson	255	14.59%	
59	Cheyenne County	1,748	0.03%		Unincorporated Cheyenne County	735	42.05%	
60	Kiowa County	1,446	0.03%	1	Town of Eads	672	46.47%	
60	Kiowa County	1,446	0.03%	2	Town of Haswell	71	4.91%	
60	Kiowa County	1,446	0.03%	3	Town of Sheridan Lake	55	3.80%	
60	Kiowa County	1,446	0.03%		Unincorporated Kiowa County	648	44.81%	
61	Jackson County	1,379	0.02%	1	Town of Walden	606	43.94%	
61	Jackson County	1,379	0.02%		Unincorporated Jackson County	773	56.06%	
62	Mineral County	865	0.01%	1	City of Creede (Note: In 1892, two rival municipalities with the name Creede were incorporated in the Creede Mining District of southwestern Colorado. On March 19, 1892, the Town of Creede was incorporated around the Creede, Colorado, post office along Willow Creek in Saguache County. On June 13, 1892, the rival City of Creede was incorporated around the Amethyst, Colorado, post office just 1.1 miles (1.8 km) south along Willow Creek. On March 27, 1893, Mineral County was created, and on November 7, 1893, county voters selected the City of Creede as the new county seat. To avoid further confusion, the United States Post Office Department changed the name of the Creede post office to North Creede, Colorado, on November 28, 1908, and changed the name of the Amethyst post office to Creede, Colorado, on February 9, 1909. As silver mining declined, both municipalities lost population, and in 1916, the City of Creede became a statutory town, but continued to use the appellation City of Creede to distinguish itself from its northern rival. On April 15, 1919, the North Creede post office closed, and the Town of Creede soon ceased operation. It was not until July 23, 2026, that the Colorado Secretary of State declared the Town of Creede abandoned. The Geographic Names Information System (GNIS) uses the name "Town of the City of Creede" to identify the county seat and sole surviving municipality of Mineral County.)	257	29.71%	
62	Mineral County	865	0.01%		Unincorporated Mineral County	608	70.29%	
63	Hinsdale County	788	0.01%	1	Town of Lake City	432	54.82%	
63	Hinsdale County	788	0.01%		Unincorporated Hinsdale County	356	45.18%	
64	San Juan County	705	0.01%	1	Town of Silverton	622	88.23%	
64	San Juan County	705	0.01%		Unincorporated San Juan County	83	11.77%	
64 Colorado counties		5,773,714	100%	272 Colorado municipalities (Note: Since the 2020 United States Census, the Town of Keystone in Summit County was incorporated on February 8, 2024, and the Town of Hartman in Prowers County was declared abandoned on July 28, 2026.)		4,299,942	(Note: At the 2020 United States Census, 74.47% of Colorado residents lived in an incorporated municipality.)	

== See also ==
- Bibliography of Colorado
- Geography of Colorado
- History of Colorado
- Index of Colorado-related articles
- List of Colorado-related lists
  - List of counties in Colorado
    - List of Colorado counties by per capita income
    - List of Colorado counties by population
    - List of Colorado counties by socioeconomic factors
    - List of Colorado counties by statistical area
    - List of Colorado county high points
    - List of Colorado populated places by county
    - List of county courthouses in Colorado
    - List of county seats in Colorado
  - List of municipalities in Colorado
    - List of Colorado municipalities by elevation
    - List of Colorado municipalities by population
    - List of Colorado municipalities in multiple counties
    - List of former municipalities in Colorado
    - List of adjectivals and demonyms for Colorado cities
    - List of neighborhoods in Denver
- Outline of Colorado
