= South Central Colorado Urban Area =

Metropolitan area of Colorado

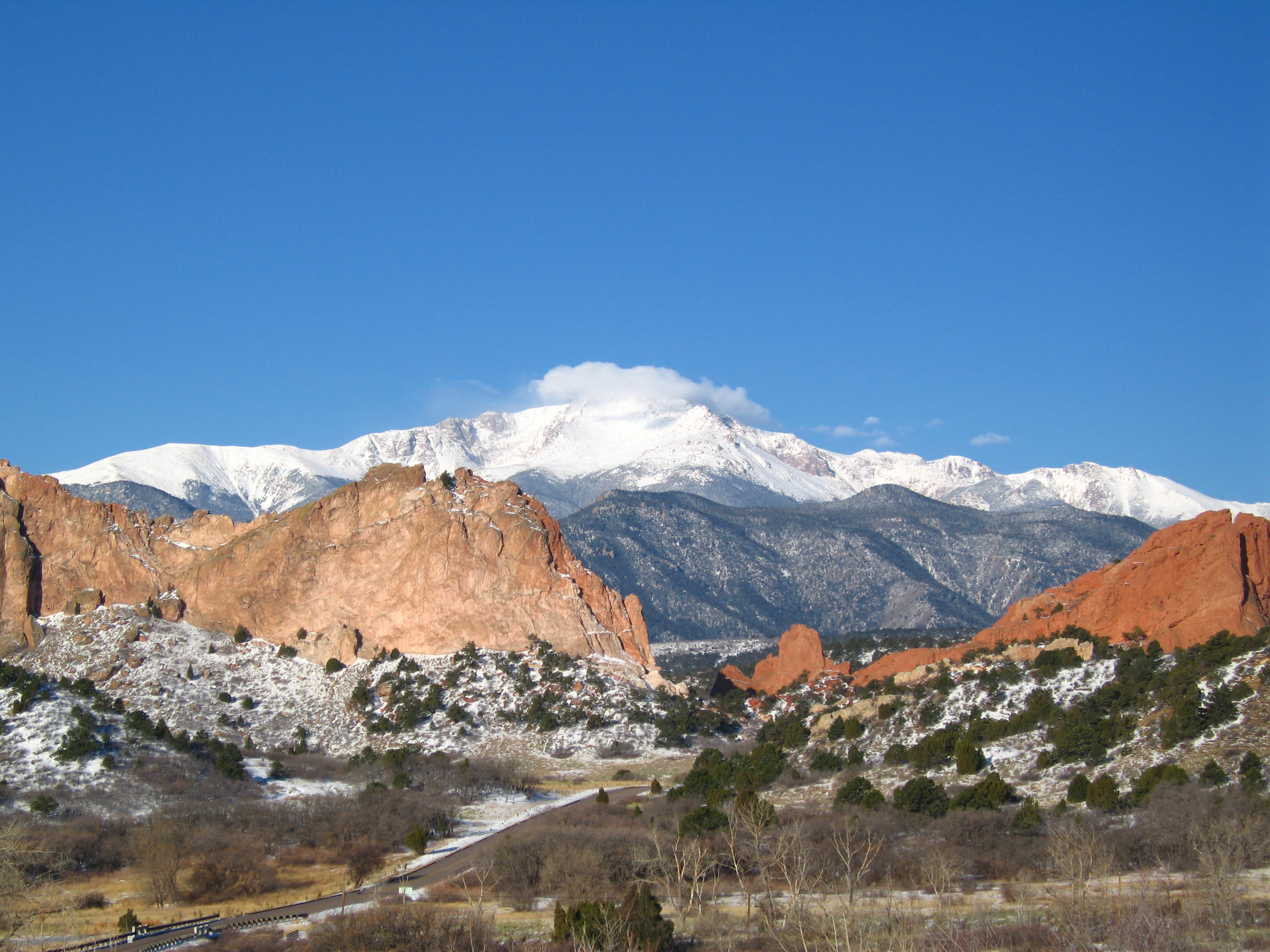
- Pikes Peak from the Garden of the Gods in Colorado Springs
Interactive map of the
South Central Colorado Urban Area
Colorado Springs, CO MSA
Pueblo, CO MSA
Cañon City, CO µSA
Other Counties in the Front Range corridor
- Coordinates: 38°33′N 104°49′W
- Country: United States
- States: Colorado
- Largest city: Colorado Springs
- Other principal cities: - Pueblo; - Cañon City

The South Central Colorado Urban Area comprises the Colorado Springs Metropolitan Statistical Area, the Pueblo Metropolitan Statistical Area, and the Cañon City Micropolitan Statistical Area in the central and south central region of the State of Colorado. With the exception of northern Teller County and small portions of northern El Paso County, the entire South Central Colorado Urban Area is drained by the Arkansas River and its tributaries. The South Central Colorado Urban Area is the southernmost of the three primary subregions of the Front Range Urban Corridor.

The South Central Colorado Urban Area had a population of 851,500 at the 2010 United States census, and increase of 17.43% from the 2000 United States census. In 2010, 16.93% of Coloradans lived in the South Central Colorado Urban Area.

== Extent ==
South Central Colorado Urban Area
Core Based Statistical Area	2010 Census	County	2010 Census	2000 Census	Pop Change
Colorado Springs, CO MSA	645,613	El Paso County, Colorado	622,263	516,929	+20.38%
Colorado Springs, CO MSA	645,613	Teller County, Colorado	23,350	20,555	+13.60%
Pueblo, CO MSA	159,063	Pueblo County, Colorado	159,063	141,472	+12.43%
Cañon City, CO μSA	46,824	Fremont County, Colorado	46,824	46,145	+1.47%
Total			851,500	725,101	+17.43%

== Municipalities ==
The 20 Municipalities of the South Central Colorado Urban Area
Rank	Municipality	County	CBSA	2010 Population
1	City of Colorado Springs	El Paso County	Colorado Springs MSA	416,427
2	City of Pueblo	Pueblo County	Pueblo MSA	106,595
3	City of Fountain	El Paso County	Colorado Springs MSA	25,846
4	City of Cañon City	Fremont County	Cañon City μSA	16,400
5	City of Woodland Park	Teller County	Colorado Springs MSA	7,200
6	Town of Monument	El Paso County	Colorado Springs MSA	5,530
7	City of Manitou Springs	El Paso County	Colorado Springs MSA	4,992
8	City of Florence	Fremont County	Cañon City μSA	3,881
9	Town of Palmer Lake	El Paso County	Colorado Springs MSA	2,240
10	City of Cripple Creek	Teller County	Colorado Springs MSA	1,189
11	Town of Calhan	El Paso County	Colorado Springs MSA	780
12	Town of Green Mountain Falls	El Paso County; Teller County	Colorado Springs MSA	773
13	Town of Williamsburg	Fremont County	Cañon City μSA	662
14	Town of Rockvale	Fremont County	Cañon City μSA	487
15	City of Victor	Teller County	Colorado Springs MSA	397
16	Town of Coal Creek	Fremont County	Cañon City μSA	343
17	Town of Boone	Pueblo County	Pueblo MSA	339
18	Town of Brookside	Fremont County	Cañon City μSA	233
19	Town of Rye	Pueblo County	Pueblo MSA	153
20	Town of Ramah	El Paso County	Colorado Springs MSA	123

== Constituent jurisdictions ==
The South Central Colorado Urban Area includes

=== Places over 100,000 inhabitants ===
- Colorado Springs
- Pueblo

=== Places with 10,000 to 100,000 inhabitants ===
- Cañon City
- Fountain

=== Places with 1,000 to 10,000 inhabitants ===
- Cripple Creek
- Florence
- Manitou Springs
- Monument
- Palmer Lake
- Woodland Park

=== Places with less than 1,000 inhabitants ===
- Brookside
- Boone
- Calhan
- Coal Creek
- Green Mountain Falls
- Ramah
- Rockvale
- Rye
- Williamsburg
- Victor

and-

- unincorporated El Paso County
- unincorporated Fremont County
- unincorporated Pueblo County
- unincorporated Teller County, Colorado.

== See also ==
- Colorado
  - Outline of Colorado
    - Index of Colorado-related articles
  - Bibliography of Colorado
  - Colorado statistical areas
    - Front Range Urban Corridor
      - North Central Colorado Urban Area
      - South Central Colorado Urban Area
  - Geography of Colorado
  - History of Colorado
  - List of counties in Colorado
  - List of places in Colorado
    - List of census-designated places in Colorado
    - List of forts in Colorado
    - List of ghost towns in Colorado
    - List of mountain passes in Colorado
    - List of mountain peaks of Colorado
    - List of municipalities in Colorado
      - List of adjectivals and demonyms for Colorado cities
      - List of city nicknames in Colorado
    - List of post offices in Colorado
  - Protected areas of Colorado
