= List of Colorado municipalities by elevation =

The location of the State of Colorado in the United States of America.

See also the Alphabetical list of municipalities in Colorado.

This list ranks the 272 active incorporated municipalities (Note: 1. At the 2000 United States Census, the State of Colorado had 269 active municipalities, comprising 196 towns, 72 cities, and one consolidated city and county government.; 2. On February 7, 2001, the City of Centennial was incorporated.; 3. On November 15, 2001, the City of Broomfield became the City and County of Broomfield, increasing the number of Colorado counties to 64.; 4. On June 30, 2004, the Town of Watkins was incorporated, but on November 30, 2006, the Town of Watkins was dissolved.; 5. On November 6, 2007, the City of Castle Pines North was incorporated.; 6. Thus, at the 2010 United States Census, the State of Colorado had 271 active municipalities, comprising 196 towns, 73 cities, and two consolidated city and county governments.; 7. On November 2, 2010, the City of Castle Pines North changed its name to the City of Castle Pines.; 8. On November 4, 2014, the property owners of Carbonate, Colorado, voted to reactivate the Town of Carbonate.; 9. Thus, at the 2020 United States Census, the State of Colorado had 272 active municipalities, comprising 197 towns, 73 cities, and two consolidated city and county governments.; 10. On April 3, 2023, the Town of Keystone was incorporated.; 11. On November 7, 2023, voters approved a Home Rule Charter for the Town of Erie.; 12. On July 28, 2026, the Town of Hartman was declared abandoned.; 13. Thus, the State of Colorado continues to have 272 active municipalities, comprising 197 towns, 73 cities, and two consolidated city and county governments.) of the US State of Colorado by the geographic elevation of the town center. (Note: Geographic elevation from the Geographic Names Information System.) Colorado has five municipalities above 10,000 feet (3,048 m) elevation, 40 above 8,000 feet (2,438 m) elevation, 115 above 6,000 feet (1,829 m) elevation, 256 above 4,000 feet (1,219 m) elevation, and all 272 municipalities are above 3,350 feet (1,021 m) elevation.

The Town of Carbonate, Colorado is technically the highest elevation municipality in the United States, however its remote location may be the reason it has had no year-round residents since the 1890 United States census. Since 1890, the Town of Alma, Colorado has been the highest elevation municipality in the United States with a year-round population. The City of Leadville, Colorado has been the highest elevation incorporated city in the United States since its incorporation on February 18, 1878. The Town of Winter Park, Colorado has the highest elevation within the municipal boundaries of any town in the United States at 12,060 feet (3,676 m).

The "Mile-High City" of Denver, the Colorado state capital, is only the 170th highest of the 272 Colorado municipalities. While the Town of Holly, Colorado is the lowest municipality in Colorado, it is higher than the high-points of 19 U.S. states and the District of Columbia.

== Municipalities ==
For the most recent population data, see the List of Colorado municipalities by population.
Select the OpenStreetMap link at the right to view the location of these municipalities.
For the official municipal boundaries map, see the Colorado municipal boundaries map.

†	County seat
‡	State capital

The 272 active municipalities of the State of Colorado ranked by elevation
Municipality	Rank (Note: Municipal rank by geographic elevation.)	Elevation	Location (Note: Geographic location from the Geographic Names Information System.)	Municipal website (Note: Municipal websites from the Colorado Department of Local Affairs.)
Carbonate (Note: On November 4, 2014, the property owners of Carbonate, Colorado voted 9 to 0 to reactivate the town government despite having no year-round residents since the 1890 United States census.)	1	10,925 feet (3,330 m)	39.7430°N 107.3467°W	Town of Carbonate
Alma (Note: The Town of Alma is the highest occupied municipality in the United States.)	2	10,361 feet (3,158 m)	39.2839°N 106.0628°W	Town of Alma
Montezuma	3	10,312 feet (3,143 m)	39.5811°N 105.8672°W	Town of Montezuma
Leadville† (Note: The City of Leadville is the seat of Lake County, Colorado, and the highest city in the United States.)	4	10,157 feet (3,096 m)	39.2508°N 106.2925°W	City of Leadville
Blue River	5	10,036 feet (3,059 m)	39.4297°N 106.0439°W	Town of Blue River
Fairplay† (Note: The Town of Fairplay is the seat of Park County, Colorado.)	6	9,954 feet (3,034 m)	39.2247°N 106.0020°W	Town of Fairplay
Breckenridge† (Note: The Town of Breckenridge is the seat of Summit County, Colorado.)	7	9,728 feet (2,965 m)	39.4817°N 106.0384°W	Town of Breckenridge
Victor	8	9,708 feet (2,959 m)	38.7100°N 105.1400°W	City of Victor
Ophir	9	9,695 feet (2,955 m)	37.8569°N 107.8326°W	Town of Ophir
Mountain Village	10	9,600 feet (2,926 m)	37.9314°N 107.8565°W	Town of Mountain Village
Mount Crested Butte	11	9,498 feet (2,895 m)	38.9086°N 106.9695°W	Town of Mount Crested Butte
Bonanza	12	9,478 feet (2,889 m)	38.2947°N 106.1422°W	Town of Bonanza
Cripple Creek† (Note: The City of Cripple Creek is the seat of Teller County, Colorado.)	13	9,455 feet (2,882 m)	38.7467°N 105.1783°W	City of Cripple Creek
Silverton† (Note: The Town of Silverton is the seat of San Juan County, Colorado.)	14	9,308 feet (2,837 m)	37.8119°N 107.6645°W	Town of Silverton
Pitkin	15	9,216 feet (2,809 m)	38.6092°N 106.5167°W	Town of Pitkin
Keystone	16	9,173 feet (2,796 m)	39.5994°N 105.9872°W	Town of Keystone
Ward	17	9,144 feet (2,787 m)	40.0722°N 105.5083°W	Town of Ward
Dillon	18	9,111 feet (2,777 m)	39.6303°N 106.0434°W	Town of Dillon
Silver Plume	19	9,101 feet (2,774 m)	39.6961°N 105.7258°W	Town of Silver Plume
Frisco	20	9,075 feet (2,766 m)	39.5744°N 106.0975°W	Town of Frisco
Winter Park (Note: The highest elevation within the municipal limits of the Town of Winter Park is 12,060 feet (3,676 m), making it the highest municipality in the United States by this measure.)	21	9,052 feet (2,759 m)	39.8917°N 105.7631°W	Town of Winter Park
Crested Butte	22	8,924 feet (2,720 m)	38.8697°N 106.9878°W	Town of Crested Butte
Rico	23	8,825 feet (2,690 m)	37.6928°N 108.0304°W	Town of Rico
Creede† (Note: In 1892, two rival municipalities with the name Creede were incorporated in the Creede Mining District of southwestern Colorado. On March 19, 1892, the Town of Creede was incorporated around the Creede, Colorado, post office along Willow Creek in Saguache County. On June 13, 1892, the rival City of Creede was incorporated around the Amethyst, Colorado, post office just 1.1 miles (1.8 km) south along Willow Creek. On March 27, 1893, Mineral County was created, and on November 7, 1893, county voters selected the City of Creede as the new county seat. To avoid further confusion, the United States Post Office Department changed the name of the Creede post office to North Creede, Colorado, on November 28 1908, and changed the name of the Amethyst post office to Creede, Colorado, on February 9, 1909. As silver mining declined, both municipalities lost population, and in 1916, the City of Creede became a statutory town, but continued to use the appellation City of Creede to distinguish itself from its northern rival. On April 15, 1919, the North Creede post office closed, and the Town of Creede soon ceased operation. It was not until July 23, 2026, that the Colorado Secretary of State declared the Town of Creede abandoned. The Geographic Names Information System (GNIS) uses the name "Town of the City of Creede" to identify the county seat and sole surviving municipality of Mineral County.)	24	8,799 feet (2,682 m)	37.8492°N 106.9264°W	City of Creede (Note: Creede uses the official title City of Creede despite its status as a Colorado statutory town.)
Telluride† (Note: The Town of Telluride is the seat of San Miguel County, Colorado.)	25	8,793 feet (2,680 m)	37.9375°N 107.8123°W	Town of Telluride
Silverthorne	26	8,757 feet (2,669 m)	39.6321°N 106.0743°W	Town of Silverthorne
Red Cliff	27	8,671 feet (2,643 m)	39.5122°N 106.3681°W	Town of Red Cliff
Lake City† (Note: The Town of Lake City is the seat of Hinsdale County, Colorado.)	28	8,661 feet (2,640 m)	38.0300°N 107.3153°W	Town of Lake City
Empire	29	8,615 feet (2,626 m)	39.7614°N 105.6844°W	Town of Empire
Fraser	30	8,579 feet (2,615 m)	39.9450°N 105.8172°W	Town of Fraser
Georgetown† (Note: The Town of Georgetown is the seat of Clear Creek County, Colorado.)	31	8,520 feet (2,597 m)	39.7061°N 105.6975°W	Town of Georgetown
Central City (Note: The City of Central is the seat of Gilpin County, Colorado.)	32	8,497 feet (2,590 m)	39.8019°N 105.5142°W	City of Central
Woodland Park	33	8,481 feet (2,585 m)	38.9939°N 105.0569°W	City of Woodland Park
Grand Lake	34	8,386 feet (2,556 m)	40.2522°N 105.8231°W	Town of Grand Lake
Nederland	35	8,232 feet (2,509 m)	39.9614°N 105.5108°W	Town of Nederland
Snowmass Village	36	8,209 feet (2,502 m)	39.2130°N 106.9378°W	Town of Snowmass Village
South Fork	36	8,209 feet (2,502 m)	37.6700°N 106.6398°W	Town of South Fork
Vail	38	8,189 feet (2,496 m)	39.6403°N 106.3742°W	Town of Vail
Walden† (Note: The Town of Walden is the seat of Jackson County, Colorado.)	39	8,097 feet (2,468 m)	40.7316°N 106.2836°W	Town of Walden
Black Hawk	40	8,074 feet (2,461 m)	39.8038°N 105.4952°W	City of Black Hawk
Marble	41	7,992 feet (2,436 m)	39.0722°N 107.1889°W	Town of Marble
Silver Cliff	42	7,986 feet (2,434 m)	38.1353°N 105.4464°W	Town of Silver Cliff
San Luis† (Note: The Town of San Luis is the seat of Costilla County, Colorado.) (Note: San Luis de la Culebra was settled on April 9, 1851, making San Luis the oldest continuously occupied community in the Colorado.)	43	7,982 feet (2,433 m)	37.2008°N 105.4239°W	Town of San Luis
Granby	44	7,976 feet (2,431 m)	40.0861°N 105.9395°W	Town of Granby
Buena Vista	45	7,959 feet (2,426 m)	38.8422°N 106.1311°W	Town of Buena Vista
Crestone	46	7,930 feet (2,417 m)	37.9964°N 105.6997°W	Town of Crestone
Aspen† (Note: The City of Aspen is the seat of Pitkin County, Colorado.)	47	7,890 feet (2,405 m)	39.1911°N 106.8175°W	City of Aspen
Antonito	48	7,887 feet (2,404 m)	37.0792°N 106.0086°W	Town of Antonito
Del Norte† (Note: The Town of Del Norte is the seat of Rio Grande County, Colorado.)	49	7,884 feet (2,403 m)	37.6789°N 106.3534°W	Town of Del Norte
Yampa	50	7,881 feet (2,402 m)	40.1525°N 106.9087°W	Town of Yampa
Westcliffe† (Note: The Town of Westcliffe is the seat of Custer County, Colorado.)	51	7,867 feet (2,398 m)	38.1347°N 105.4658°W	Town of Westcliffe
Minturn	52	7,861 feet (2,396 m)	39.5864°N 106.4309°W	Town of Minturn
Ouray† (Note: The City of Ouray is the seat of Ouray County, Colorado.)	53	7,792 feet (2,375 m)	38.0228°N 107.6714°W	City of Ouray
Green Mountain Falls	54	7,756 feet (2,364 m)	38.9350°N 105.0169°W	Town of Green Mountain Falls
Blanca	54	7,756 feet (2,364 m)	37.4381°N 105.5158°W	Town of Blanca
Romeo	56	7,736 feet (2,358 m)	37.1722°N 105.9853°W	Town of Romeo
Hot Sulphur Springs† (Note: The Town of Hot Sulphur Springs is the seat of Grand County, Colorado.)	57	7,730 feet (2,356 m)	40.0730°N 106.1028°W	Town of Hot Sulphur Springs
Gunnison† (Note: The City of Gunnison is the seat of Gunnison County, Colorado.)	58	7,703 feet (2,348 m)	38.5458°N 106.9253°W	City of Gunnison
Saguache† (Note: The Town of Saguache is the seat of Saguache County, Colorado.) (Note: The name "Saguache" is pronounced /səˈwætʃ/. This name comes from the Ute language noun "sawup" /səˈwʌp/ meaning "sand dunes". The Spanish language version of this name is usually spelled "Saguache", while the English language version is usually spelled "Sawatch".)	58	7,703 feet (2,348 m)	38.0875°N 106.1420°W	Town of Saguache
Manassa	60	7,687 feet (2,343 m)	37.1742°N 105.9375°W	Town of Manassa
Monte Vista	61	7,664 feet (2,336 m)	37.5792°N 106.1481°W	City of Monte Vista
Center	62	7,644 feet (2,330 m)	37.7531°N 106.1086°W	Town of Center
La Jara	63	7,605 feet (2,318 m)	37.2750°N 105.9603°W	Town of La Jara
Sanford	64	7,602 feet (2,317 m)	37.2583°N 105.9047°W	Town of Sanford
Sawpit	65	7,592 feet (2,314 m)	37.9953°N 108.0017°W	Town of Sawpit
Moffat	66	7,566 feet (2,306 m)	37.9989°N 105.9100°W	Town of Moffat
Hooper	67	7,559 feet (2,304 m)	37.7428°N 105.8753°W	Town of Hooper
Alamosa† (Note: The Town of Alamosa is the seat of Alamosa County, Colorado.)	68	7,543 feet (2,299 m)	37.4694°N 105.8700°W	City of Alamosa
Estes Park	69	7,530 feet (2,295 m)	40.3772°N 105.5217°W	Town of Estes Park
Idaho Springs	70	7,526 feet (2,294 m)	39.7425°N 105.5136°W	City of Idaho Springs
Poncha Springs	71	7,470 feet (2,277 m)	38.5128°N 106.0772°W	Town of Poncha Springs
Avon	72	7,431 feet (2,265 m)	39.6314°N 106.5223°W	Town of Avon
Oak Creek	73	7,428 feet (2,264 m)	40.2750°N 106.9584°W	Town of Oak Creek
Kremmling	74	7,313 feet (2,229 m)	40.0589°N 106.3889°W	Town of Kremmling
Palmer Lake	75	7,297 feet (2,224 m)	39.1222°N 104.9172°W	Town of Palmer Lake
Pagosa Springs† (Note: The Town of Pagosa Springs is the seat of Archuleta County, Colorado.)	76	7,126 feet (2,172 m)	37.2695°N 107.0098°W	Town of Pagosa Springs
Salida† (Note: The City of Salida is the seat of Chaffee County, Colorado.)	77	7,083 feet (2,159 m)	38.5347°N 105.9989°W	City of Salida
Ridgway	78	7,047 feet (2,148 m)	38.1528°N 107.7617°W	Town of Ridgway
La Veta	79	7,037 feet (2,145 m)	37.5050°N 105.0078°W	Town of La Veta
Mancos	80	7,028 feet (2,142 m)	37.3450°N 108.2892°W	Town of Mancos
Norwood	81	7,011 feet (2,137 m)	38.1305°N 108.2923°W	Town of Norwood
Monument	82	6,975 feet (2,126 m)	39.0917°N 104.8728°W	Town of Monument
Jamestown	83	6,946 feet (2,117 m)	40.1155°N 105.3886°W	Town of Jamestown
Dolores	84	6,936 feet (2,114 m)	37.4739°N 108.5045°W	Town of Dolores
Bayfield	85	6,900 feet (2,103 m)	37.2256°N 107.5981°W	Town of Bayfield
Dove Creek† (Note: The Town of Dove Creek is the seat of Dolores County, Colorado.)	86	6,844 feet (2,086 m)	37.7661°N 108.9059°W	Town of Dove Creek
Rye	87	6,801 feet (2,073 m)	37.9236°N 104.9303°W	Town of Rye
Steamboat Springs† (Note: The City of Steamboat Springs is the seat of Routt County, Colorado.)	88	6,732 feet (2,052 m)	40.4850°N 106.8317°W	City of Steamboat Springs
Larkspur	89	6,726 feet (2,050 m)	39.2286°N 104.8872°W	Town of Larkspur
Basalt	90	6,611 feet (2,015 m)	39.3689°N 107.0328°W	Town of Basalt
Eagle† (Note: The Town of Eagle is the seat of Eagle County, Colorado.)	91	6,601 feet (2,012 m)	39.6553°N 106.8287°W	Town of Eagle
Crawford	92	6,558 feet (1,999 m)	38.7039°N 107.6089°W	Town of Crawford
Calhan	93	6,535 feet (1,992 m)	39.0355°N 104.2972°W	Town of Calhan
Durango† (Note: The City of Durango is the seat of La Plata County, Colorado.)	94	6,532 feet (1,991 m)	37.2753°N 107.8801°W	City of Durango
Elizabeth	95	6,476 feet (1,974 m)	39.3603°N 104.5969°W	Town of Elizabeth
Ignacio (Note: The Town of Ignacio is the headquarters of the Southern Ute Indian Tribe.)	96	6,453 feet (1,967 m)	37.1150°N 107.6331°W	Town of Ignacio
Aguilar	97	6,388 feet (1,947 m)	37.4028°N 104.6533°W	Town of Aguilar
Kiowa† (Note: The Town of Kiowa is the seat of Elbert County, Colorado.)	98	6,378 feet (1,944 m)	39.3472°N 104.4644°W	Town of Kiowa
Starkville	98	6,378 feet (1,944 m)	37.1153°N 104.5242°W	Town of Starkville
Castle Pines	100	6,371 feet (1,942 m)	39.4717°N 104.8948°W	City of Castle Pines
Manitou Springs	101	6,358 feet (1,938 m)	38.8597°N 104.9172°W	City of Manitou Springs
Hayden	102	6,348 feet (1,935 m)	40.4953°N 107.2573°W	Town of Hayden
Cokedale	103	6,319 feet (1,926 m)	37.1453°N 104.6211°W	Town of Cokedale
Gypsum	104	6,312 feet (1,924 m)	39.6469°N 106.9517°W	Town of Gypsum
Branson (Note: The Town of Branson is the southernmost municipality in Colorado.)	105	6,270 feet (1,911 m)	37.0175°N 103.8844°W	Town of Branson
Meeker† (Note: The Town of Meeker is the seat of Rio Blanco County, Colorado.)	106	6,240 feet (1,902 m)	40.0375°N 107.9131°W	Town of Meeker
Cedaredge	107	6,230 feet (1,899 m)	38.9016°N 107.9265°W	Town of Cedaredge
Castle Rock† (Note: The Town of Castle Rock is the seat of Douglas County, Colorado.)	108	6,217 feet (1,895 m)	39.3722°N 104.8561°W	Town of Castle Rock
Craig† (Note: The City of Craig is the seat of Moffat County, Colorado.)	109	6,198 feet (1,889 m)	40.5152°N 107.5465°W	City of Craig
Cortez† (Note: The City of Cortez is the seat of Montezuma County, Colorado.)	110	6,191 feet (1,887 m)	37.3489°N 108.5859°W	City of Cortez
Carbondale	111	6,171 feet (1,881 m)	39.4022°N 107.2112°W	Town of Carbondale
Walsenburg† (Note: The City of Walsenburg is the seat of Huerfano County, Colorado.)	111	6,171 feet (1,881 m)	37.6242°N 104.7803°W	City of Walsenburg
Ramah	113	6,119 feet (1,865 m)	39.1217°N 104.1658°W	Town of Ramah
Trinidad† (Note: The City of Trinidad is the seat of Las Animas County, Colorado.)	114	6,033 feet (1,839 m)	37.1695°N 104.5005°W	City of Trinidad
Colorado Springs† (Note: The City of Colorado Springs is the seat of El Paso County, Colorado.)	115	6,010 feet (1,832 m)	38.8339°N 104.8214°W	City of Colorado Springs
Lone Tree	116	5,997 feet (1,828 m)	39.5314°N 104.8620°W	City of Lone Tree
Collbran	117	5,988 feet (1,825 m)	39.2405°N 107.9612°W	Town of Collbran
Simla	118	5,978 feet (1,822 m)	39.1417°N 104.0838°W	Town of Simla
Dinosaur (Note: The Town of Dinosaur is the westernmost municipality in Colorado.)	119	5,922 feet (1,805 m)	40.2436°N 109.0146°W	Town of Dinosaur
Parker	120	5,869 feet (1,789 m)	39.5186°N 104.7614°W	Town of Parker
Centennial	121	5,837 feet (1,779 m)	39.5792°N 104.8769°W	City of Centennial
Montrose† (Note: The City of Montrose is the seat of Montrose County, Colorado.)	122	5,807 feet (1,770 m)	38.4783°N 107.8762°W	City of Montrose
Nucla	123	5,787 feet (1,764 m)	38.2694°N 108.5479°W	Town of Nucla
Morrison	124	5,764 feet (1,757 m)	39.6536°N 105.1911°W	Town of Morrison
Glenwood Springs† (Note: The City of Glenwood Springs is the seat of Garfield County, Colorado.)	125	5,761 feet (1,756 m)	39.5505°N 107.3248°W	City of Glenwood Springs
Foxfield	126	5,755 feet (1,754 m)	39.5917°N 104.7925°W	Town of Foxfield
Kim	127	5,692 feet (1,735 m)	37.2467°N 103.3522°W	Town of Kim
Paonia	128	5,682 feet (1,732 m)	38.8683°N 107.5920°W	Town of Paonia
Golden† (Note: The City of Golden is the seat of Jefferson County, Colorado.)	129	5,673 feet (1,729 m)	39.7555°N 105.2211°W	City of Golden
Genoa	130	5,604 feet (1,708 m)	39.2783°N 103.5002°W	Town of Genoa
New Castle	131	5,597 feet (1,706 m)	39.5728°N 107.5364°W	Town of New Castle
Fountain	132	5,545 feet (1,690 m)	38.6822°N 104.7008°W	City of Fountain
Lakewood	133	5,518 feet (1,682 m)	39.7047°N 105.0814°W	City of Lakewood
Bow Mar	133	5,518 feet (1,682 m)	39.6283°N 105.0500°W	Town of Bow Mar
Superior	135	5,499 feet (1,676 m)	39.9528°N 105.1686°W	Town of Superior
Bennett	136	5,486 feet (1,672 m)	39.7589°N 104.4275°W	Town of Bennett
Greenwood Village	137	5,469 feet (1,667 m)	39.6172°N 104.9508°W	City of Greenwood Village
Rockvale	138	5,463 feet (1,665 m)	38.3697°N 105.1639°W	Town of Rockvale
Wheat Ridge	139	5,459 feet (1,664 m)	39.7661°N 105.0772°W	City of Wheat Ridge
Silt	140	5,456 feet (1,663 m)	39.5486°N 107.6562°W	Town of Silt
Orchard City	141	5,446 feet (1,660 m)	38.8283°N 107.9709°W	Town of Orchard City
Coal Creek (Note: The Town of Coal Creek should not be confused with the Coal Creek CDP.)	142	5,427 feet (1,654 m)	38.3611°N 105.1483°W	Town of Coal Creek
Cherry Hills Village	143	5,423 feet (1,653 m)	39.6417°N 104.9594°W	City of Cherry Hills Village
Naturita	143	5,423 feet (1,653 m)	38.2183°N 108.5687°W	Town of Naturita
Aurora	145	5,404 feet (1,647 m)	39.7294°N 104.8319°W	City of Aurora
Broomfield† (Note: As a consolidated city and county, the City and County of Broomfield is its own county seat.)	146	5,390 feet (1,643 m)	39.9205°N 105.0867°W	City and County of Broomfield
Williamsburg	146	5,390 feet (1,643 m)	38.3819°N 105.1519°W	Town of Williamsburg
Mountain View	148	5,387 feet (1,642 m)	39.7744°N 105.0555°W	Town of Mountain View
Westminster	149	5,381 feet (1,640 m)	39.8367°N 105.0372°W	City of Westminster
Edgewater	149	5,381 feet (1,640 m)	39.7530°N 105.0642°W	City of Edgewater
Limon	151	5,377 feet (1,639 m)	39.2639°N 103.6922°W	Town of Limon
Northglenn	152	5,371 feet (1,637 m)	39.8855°N 104.9872°W	City of Northglenn
Englewood	152	5,371 feet (1,637 m)	39.6478°N 104.9878°W	City of Englewood
Lyons	154	5,364 feet (1,635 m)	40.2247°N 105.2714°W	Town of Lyons
Lakeside	154	5,364 feet (1,635 m)	39.7772°N 105.0558°W	Town of Lakeside
Olathe	156	5,358 feet (1,633 m)	38.6050°N 107.9823°W	Town of Olathe
Littleton† (Note: The City of Littleton is the seat of Arapahoe County, Colorado.)	157	5,351 feet (1,631 m)	39.6133°N 105.0166°W	City of Littleton
Cañon City† (Note: The City of Cañon City is the seat of Fremont County, Colorado.)	157	5,351 feet (1,631 m)	38.4410°N 105.2424°W	City of Cañon City
Glendale	157	5,351 feet (1,631 m)	39.7050°N 104.9336°W	City of Glendale
Thornton	160	5,348 feet (1,630 m)	39.8680°N 104.9719°W	City of Thornton
Arvada	160	5,348 feet (1,630 m)	39.8028°N 105.0875°W	City of Arvada
Rifle	160	5,348 feet (1,630 m)	39.5347°N 107.7831°W	City of Rifle
Columbine Valley	160	5,348 feet (1,630 m)	39.6011°N 105.0322°W	Town of Columbine Valley
Brookside	160	5,348 feet (1,630 m)	38.4153°N 105.1919°W	Town of Brookside
Louisville	165	5,338 feet (1,627 m)	39.9778°N 105.1319°W	City of Louisville
Hotchkiss	166	5,331 feet (1,625 m)	38.7997°N 107.7195°W	Town of Hotchkiss
Sheridan	167	5,322 feet (1,622 m)	39.6469°N 105.0253°W	City of Sheridan
Boulder† (Note: The City of Boulder is the seat of Boulder County, Colorado.)	168	5,318 feet (1,621 m)	40.0150°N 105.2705°W	City of Boulder
Federal Heights	169	5,302 feet (1,616 m)	39.8514°N 104.9986°W	City of Federal Heights
Denver‡ (Note: The City and County of Denver is the capital of the State of Colorado.) (Note: As a consolidated city and county, the City and County of Denver is its own county seat.) (Note: Denver has retained its "Mile-High City" elevation of 5,280 feet (1,609.344 m) despite advances in scientific measurement. When the National Geodetic Survey makes adjustments to the North American Vertical Datum (NAVD), the State of Colorado moves the official mile-high elevation point up or down the west steps of the Colorado State Capitol to reflect the changes. Most of Denver actually lies above this elevation.)	170	5,280 feet (1,609.344 m)	39.7392°N 104.9849°W	City and County of Denver
Arriba	171	5,240 feet (1,597 m)	39.2861°N 103.2755°W	Town of Arriba
Rangely	172	5,233 feet (1,595 m)	40.0875°N 108.8048°W	Town of Rangely
Lafayette	173	5,210 feet (1,588 m)	39.9936°N 105.0897°W	City of Lafayette
Wellington	174	5,203 feet (1,586 m)	40.7039°N 105.0086°W	Town of Wellington
Deer Trail	175	5,190 feet (1,582 m)	39.6150°N 104.0444°W	Town of Deer Trail
Nunn	175	5,190 feet (1,582 m)	40.7036°N 104.7808°W	Town of Nunn
Florence	177	5,180 feet (1,579 m)	38.3903°N 105.1186°W	City of Florence
Commerce City	178	5,161 feet (1,573 m)	39.8083°N 104.9339°W	City of Commerce City
Parachute	179	5,092 feet (1,552 m)	39.4519°N 108.0529°W	Town of Parachute
Grover	180	5,075 feet (1,547 m)	40.8714°N 104.2252°W	Town of Grover
Hugo† (Note: The Town of Hugo is the seat of Lincoln County, Colorado.)	181	5,039 feet (1,536 m)	39.1361°N 103.4699°W	Town of Hugo
Pierce	182	5,036 feet (1,535 m)	40.6355°N 104.7552°W	Town of Pierce
Berthoud	183	5,033 feet (1,534 m)	40.3083°N 105.0811°W	Town of Berthoud
Erie	184	5,026 feet (1,532 m)	40.0503°N 105.0500°W	Town of Erie
Dacono	185	5,023 feet (1,531 m)	40.0847°N 104.9394°W	City of Dacono
Lochbuie	186	5,020 feet (1,530 m)	40.0072°N 104.7161°W	Town of Lochbuie
Fort Collins† (Note: The City of Fort Collins is the seat of Larimer County, Colorado.)	187	5,003 feet (1,525 m)	40.5853°N 105.0844°W	City of Fort Collins
Mead	187	5,003 feet (1,525 m)	40.2333°N 104.9986°W	Town of Mead
Hudson	189	5,000 feet (1,524 m)	40.0736°N 104.6430°W	Town of Hudson
Loveland	190	4,987 feet (1,520 m)	40.3978°N 105.0750°W	City of Loveland
Brighton† (Note: The City of Brighton is the seat of Adams County, Colorado.)	190	4,987 feet (1,520 m)	39.9853°N 104.8205°W	City of Brighton
Longmont	192	4,980 feet (1,518 m)	40.1672°N 105.1019°W	City of Longmont
Frederick	192	4,980 feet (1,518 m)	40.0992°N 104.9372°W	Town of Frederick
Firestone	194	4,970 feet (1,515 m)	40.1125°N 104.9366°W	Town of Firestone
Delta† (Note: The City of Delta is the seat of Delta County, Colorado.)	195	4,961 feet (1,512 m)	38.7422°N 108.0690°W	City of Delta
Keenesburg	196	4,954 feet (1,510 m)	40.1083°N 104.5200°W	Town of Keenesburg
De Beque	196	4,954 feet (1,510 m)	39.3344°N 108.2151°W	Town of De Beque
Flagler	198	4,941 feet (1,506 m)	39.2930°N 103.0672°W	Town of Flagler
Ault	199	4,938 feet (1,505 m)	40.5825°N 104.7319°W	Town of Ault
Fort Lupton	200	4,905 feet (1,495 m)	40.0847°N 104.8130°W	City of Fort Lupton
Severance	201	4,888 feet (1,490 m)	40.5241°N 104.8511°W	Town of Severance
Timnath	202	4,869 feet (1,484 m)	40.5291°N 104.9853°W	Town of Timnath
Johnstown	203	4,852 feet (1,479 m)	40.3369°N 104.9122°W	Town of Johnstown
Eaton	204	4,839 feet (1,475 m)	40.5303°N 104.7114°W	Town of Eaton
Pritchett	205	4,836 feet (1,474 m)	37.3717°N 102.8605°W	Town of Pritchett
Platteville	206	4,813 feet (1,467 m)	40.2150°N 104.8227°W	Town of Platteville
Windsor	207	4,797 feet (1,462 m)	40.4775°N 104.9014°W	Town of Windsor
Raymer (Note: The Town of Raymer is served by the New Raymer post office, creating some confusion about the town's name.)	208	4,777 feet (1,456 m)	40.6080°N 103.8425°W	Town of Raymer
Gilcrest	209	4,754 feet (1,449 m)	40.2819°N 104.7777°W	Town of Gilcrest
Milliken	210	4,751 feet (1,448 m)	40.3294°N 104.8553°W	Town of Milliken
Palisade	211	4,728 feet (1,441 m)	39.1103°N 108.3509°W	Town of Palisade
Seibert	212	4,711 feet (1,436 m)	39.2992°N 102.8691°W	Town of Seibert
Garden City	213	4,698 feet (1,432 m)	40.3939°N 104.6894°W	Town of Garden City
Pueblo† (Note: The City of Pueblo is the seat of Pueblo County, Colorado.)	214	4,692 feet (1,430 m)	38.2544°N 104.6091°W	City of Pueblo
LaSalle	215	4,678 feet (1,426 m)	40.3489°N 104.7019°W	Town of LaSalle
Greeley† (Note: The City of Greeley is the seat of Weld County, Colorado.)	216	4,675 feet (1,425 m)	40.4233°N 104.7091°W	City of Greeley
Akron† (Note: The Town of Akron is the seat of Washington County, Colorado.)	217	4,659 feet (1,420 m)	40.1605°N 103.2144°W	Town of Akron
Evans	218	4,652 feet (1,418 m)	40.3764°N 104.6922°W	City of Evans
Kersey	219	4,616 feet (1,407 m)	40.3875°N 104.5616°W	Town of Kersey
Grand Junction† (Note: The City of Grand Junction is the seat of Mesa County, Colorado.)	220	4,590 feet (1,399 m)	39.0639°N 108.5506°W	City of Grand Junction
Wiggins	221	4,554 feet (1,388 m)	40.2305°N 104.0727°W	Town of Wiggins
Haswell	222	4,544 feet (1,385 m)	38.4522°N 103.1630°W	Town of Haswell
Fruita	223	4,511 feet (1,375 m)	39.1589°N 108.7290°W	City of Fruita
Vona	224	4,505 feet (1,373 m)	39.3036°N 102.7430°W	Town of Vona
Boone	225	4,465 feet (1,361 m)	38.2486°N 104.2569°W	Town of Boone
Peetz	226	4,432 feet (1,351 m)	40.9628°N 103.1124°W	Town of Peetz
Stratton	227	4,413 feet (1,345 m)	39.3033°N 102.6046°W	Town of Stratton
Olney Springs	228	4,383 feet (1,336 m)	38.1661°N 103.9447°W	Town of Olney Springs
Springfield† (Note: The Town of Springfield is the seat of Baca County, Colorado.)	229	4,360 feet (1,329 m)	37.4083°N 102.6144°W	Town of Springfield
Crowley	230	4,354 feet (1,327 m)	38.1931°N 103.8561°W	Town of Crowley
Campo	231	4,344 feet (1,324 m)	37.1050°N 102.5796°W	Town of Campo
Fowler	232	4,341 feet (1,323 m)	38.1292°N 104.0233°W	Town of Fowler
Otis	232	4,341 feet (1,323 m)	40.1489°N 102.9630°W	Town of Otis
Fort Morgan† (Note: The City of Fort Morgan is the seat of Morgan County, Colorado.)	234	4,327 feet (1,319 m)	40.2503°N 103.8000°W	City of Fort Morgan
Ordway† (Note: The Town of Ordway is the seat of Crowley County, Colorado.)	235	4,311 feet (1,314 m)	38.2181°N 103.7561°W	Town of Ordway
Log Lane Village	236	4,308 feet (1,313 m)	40.2705°N 103.8297°W	Town of Log Lane Village
Sugar City	237	4,304 feet (1,312 m)	38.2319°N 103.6630°W	Town of Sugar City
Cheyenne Wells† (Note: The Town of Cheyenne Wells is the seat of Cheyenne County, Colorado.)	238	4,291 feet (1,308 m)	38.8214°N 102.3532°W	Town of Cheyenne Wells
Kit Carson	239	4,285 feet (1,306 m)	38.7611°N 102.7894°W	Town of Kit Carson
Bethune	240	4,259 feet (1,298 m)	39.3042°N 102.4246°W	Town of Bethune
Manzanola	241	4,255 feet (1,297 m)	38.1095°N 103.8661°W	Town of Manzanola
Fleming	242	4,242 feet (1,293 m)	40.6800°N 102.8394°W	Town of Fleming
Brush	243	4,219 feet (1,286 m)	40.2589°N 103.6238°W	City of Brush
Eads† (Note: The Town of Eads is the seat of Kiowa County, Colorado.)	243	4,219 feet (1,286 m)	38.4806°N 102.7819°W	Town of Eads
Rocky Ford	245	4,180 feet (1,274 m)	38.0525°N 103.7202°W	City of Rocky Ford
Burlington† (Note: The City of Burlington is the seat of Kit Carson County, Colorado.)	246	4,170 feet (1,271 m)	39.3061°N 102.2694°W	City of Burlington
Hillrose	246	4,170 feet (1,271 m)	40.3258°N 103.5219°W	Town of Hillrose
Vilas	248	4,154 feet (1,266 m)	37.3736°N 102.4463°W	Town of Vilas
Yuma	249	4,137 feet (1,261 m)	40.1222°N 102.7252°W	City of Yuma
Cheraw	250	4,131 feet (1,259 m)	38.1070°N 103.5102°W	Town of Cheraw
Swink	251	4,121 feet (1,256 m)	38.0145°N 103.6283°W	Town of Swink
Two Buttes	252	4,111 feet (1,253 m)	37.5611°N 102.3977°W	Town of Two Buttes
La Junta† (Note: The City of La Junta is the seat of Otero County, Colorado.)	253	4,078 feet (1,243 m)	37.9850°N 103.5438°W	City of La Junta
Sheridan Lake	254	4,072 feet (1,241 m)	38.4667°N 102.2921°W	Town of Sheridan Lake
Merino	255	4,042 feet (1,232 m)	40.4825°N 103.3513°W	Town of Merino
Haxtun	256	4,029 feet (1,228 m)	40.6411°N 102.6269°W	Town of Haxtun
Walsh	257	3,953 feet (1,205 m)	37.3861°N 102.2782°W	Town of Walsh
Sterling† (Note: The City of Sterling is the seat of Logan County, Colorado.)	258	3,937 feet (1,200 m)	40.6255°N 103.2077°W	City of Sterling
Las Animas† (Note: The City of Las Animas is the seat of Bent County, Colorado.)	259	3,898 feet (1,188 m)	38.0667°N 103.2227°W	City of Las Animas
Eckley	260	3,894 feet (1,187 m)	40.1139°N 102.4908°W	Town of Eckley
Paoli	260	3,894 feet (1,187 m)	40.6122°N 102.4727°W	Town of Paoli
Iliff	262	3,835 feet (1,169 m)	40.7592°N 103.0666°W	Town of Iliff
Holyoke† (Note: The City of Holyoke is the seat of Phillips County, Colorado.)	263	3,737 feet (1,139 m)	40.5844°N 102.3024°W	City of Holyoke
Wiley	263	3,737 feet (1,139 m)	38.1542°N 102.7196°W	Town of Wiley
Crook	265	3,707 feet (1,130 m)	40.8589°N 102.8010°W	Town of Crook
Lamar† (Note: The City of Lamar is the seat of Prowers County, Colorado.)	266	3,619 feet (1,103 m)	38.0872°N 102.6207°W	City of Lamar
Sedgwick	267	3,586 feet (1,093 m)	40.9364°N 102.5255°W	Town of Sedgwick
Wray† (Note: The City of Wray is the seat of Yuma County, Colorado.)	268	3,563 feet (1,086 m)	40.0758°N 102.2232°W	City of Wray
Ovid	269	3,530 feet (1,076 m)	40.9605°N 102.3880°W	Town of Ovid
Granada	270	3,484 feet (1,062 m)	38.0639°N 102.3105°W	Town of Granada
Julesburg† (Note: The Town of Julesburg is the seat of Sedgwick County, Colorado.) (Note: The Town of Julesburg is the northernmost municipality in Colorado.)	271	3,478 feet (1,060 m)	40.9883°N 102.2644°W	Town of Julesburg
Holly (Note: The Town of Holly is the easternmost municipality in Colorado. Despite having the lowest elevation of any Colorado municipality, Holly is higher than the high points of 19 states and the District of Columbia.)	272	3,392 feet (1,034 m)	38.0522°N 102.1227°W	Town of Holly

== See also ==
- Bibliography of Colorado
- Geography of Colorado
- History of Colorado
- Index of Colorado-related articles
- List of Colorado-related lists
- Outline of Colorado
