= List of adjectivals and demonyms for Colorado cities =

Coordinates: 38.9972°N 105.5478°W

The location of the State of Colorado in the United States of America.

The following table lists the adjectival and demonymic forms of some cities and towns in the U.S. State of Colorado.

== Cities and towns ==
City	Adjectival	Demonym
Aguilar	Aguilar	Aguilarans
Akron	Akron	Akronites
Alamosa	Alamosa	Alamosans
Alma	Alma	Almaniacs
Antonito	Antonito	Antonitonians
Arriba	Arriba	Arribans
Arvada	Arvada	Arvadans
Aspen	Aspen	Aspenites
Ault	Ault	Aultans
Aurora	Aurora	Aurorans
Avon	Avon	Avonites
Basalt	Basalt	Basaltines
Bayfield	Bayfield	Bayfielders
Bennett	Bennett	Bennettites
Berthoud	Berthoud	Berthoudites
Bethune	Bethune	Bethunians
Black Hawk	Black Hawk	
Blanca	Blanca	Blancans
Blue River	Blue River	Blue Riverites
Bonanza	Bonanza	Bonanzans
Boone	Boone	Boonites
Boulder	Boulder	Boulderites
Bow Mar	Bow Mar	Bow Marites
Branson	Branson	Bransonites
Breckenridge	Breckenridge	Breckenridgians
Brighton	Brighton	Brightonites
Brookside	Brookside	Brooksiders
Broomfield	Broomfield	Broomfielders
Brush	Brush	
Buena Vista	Buena Vista	Buena Vistans
Burlington	Burlington	Burlingtonians
Calhan	Calhan	Calhanites
Campo	Campo	Camponites
Cañon City	Cañon City	Cañon Citians
Carbondale	Carbondale	Bonedailians
Castle Pines	Castle Pines	Castle Piners
Castle Rock	Castle Rock	Castle Rockers
Cedaredge	Cedaredge	Cedaredgers
Centennial	Centennial	Centennians
Center	Center	Centerites
Central City	Central City	Central Citians
Cheraw	Cheraw	
Cherry Hills Village	Cherry Hills	Cherry Hills Villagers
Cheyenne Wells	Cheyenne Wells	
Coal Creek	Coal Creek	Coal Creekers
Cokedale	Cokedale	Cokedalers
Collbran	Collbran	Collbranites
Colorado Springs	Colorado Springs, The Springs	Springsteens
Columbine Valley	Columbine Valley	
Commerce City	Commerce City	Commerce Citians
Como	Como	Comovers
Cortez	Cortez	Cortezians
Craig	Craig	Craigsters
Crawford	Crawford	Crawfordites
Creede	Creede	Creedtards
Crested Butte	Crested Butte	Butians
Crestone	Crestone	Crestonians
Cripple Creek	Cripple Creek	Cripple Creekian
Crook	Crook	
Crowley	Crowley	
Dacono	Dacono	Daconoans
De Beque	De Beque	De Bequers
Deer Trail	Deer Trail	Deer Trailers
Del Norte	Del Norte	Del Nortans
Delta	Delta	Deltans
Denver	Denver, Mile High	Denverites
Dillon	Dillon	Dillonites
Dinosaur	Dinosaur	
Dolores	Dolores	Doloresites
Dove Creek	Dove Creek	Dove Creekers
Durango	Durango	Durangoans
Eads	Eads	Eadsters
Eagle	Eagle	
Eaton	Eaton	Eatonites
Eckley	Eckley	Eckleyans
Edgewater	Edgewater	Edgewaterites
Elizabeth	Elizabeth	Elizabethans
Empire	Empire	Empirians
Englewood	Englewood	Englewoodsters
Erie	Erie	Erieans
Estes Park	Estes	Estes Parkers
Evans	Evans	
Evergreen	Evergreen	Evergreeners
Fairplay	Fairplay	Fairplayers
Federal Heights	Federal Heights	Federales
Firestone	Firestone	Firestonians, Firestoners
Flagler	Flagler	Flaglerites
Fleming	Fleming	
Florence	Florence	Florentines
Fort Collins	Fort Collins	Collinites
Fort Lupton	Fort Lupton	Luptonites
Fort Morgan	Fort Morgan	Morganites
Fountain	Fountain	Fountainites
Fowler	Fowler	Fowlerites
Foxfield	Foxfield	Foxfielders
Fraser	Fraser	Fraserites
Frederick	Frederick	
Frisco	Frisco	Friscans
Fruita	Fruita	Fruits
Garden City	Garden City	Garden Citians
Genoa	Genoa	Genoans
Georgetown	Georgetown	Georgetowners
Gilcrest	Gilcrest	Gilcrestites
Glendale	Glendale	Glendalites
Glenwood Springs	Glenwood	Glenwoodites
Golden	Golden	Goldenites
Granada	Granada	Granadians
Granby	Granby	Granbyites
Grand Junction	Grand Junction, Junction	Grand Junctioneers
Grand Lake	Grand Lake	Grand Lakers
Greeley	Greeley	Greeleyites
Green Mountain Falls	Green Mountain Falls	
Greenwood Village	Greenwood	Greenwood Villagers
Grover	Grover	Groverites
Gunnison	Gunnison	Gunnisonites
Gypsum	Gypsum	Gypsumites
Hartman	Hartman	Hartmanites
Haswell	Haswell	Haswellians
Haxtun	Haxtun	Haxtunites
Hayden	Hayden	Hayden
Highlands Ranch	Highlands	Highlands Ranchers
Hillrose	Hillrose	
Holly	Holly	
Holyoke	Holyoke	Holyokens
Hooper	Hooper	Hooperites
Hot Sulphur Springs	Hot Sulphur Springs	Hot Sulphur Springsians
Hotchkiss	Hotchkiss	Hotchkissers
Hudson	Hudson	Hudsonites
Hugo	Hugo	
Idaho Springs	Idaho Springs	Idaho Springsians
Ignacio	Ignacio	
Iliff	Iliff	
Jamestown	Jamestown	Jamestowners
Johnstown	Johnstown	Johnstowners
Julesburg	Julesburg	Julesburgers
Keenesburg	Keenesburg	Keenesburgers
Kersey	Kersey	Kerseyans
Kim	Kim	
Kiowa	Kiowa	Kiowans
Kit Carson	Kit Carson	Carsonites
Kremmling	Kremmling	Kremmlins
La Jara	La Jara	La Jarans
La Junta	La Junta	La Juntans
La Veta	La Veta	La Vetans
Lafayette	Lafayette	Lafayetis
Lake City	Lake City	Lake Citians
Lakeside	Lakeside	Lakesiders
Lakewood	Lakewood	Lakewoodites
Lamar	Lamar	Lamarites
Larkspur	Larkspur	Larkspurites
Las Animas	Las Animas	
LaSalle	LaSalle	
Leadville	Leadville	Leadvillains
Limon	Limon	Limonites
Littleton	Littleton	Littletonians (pronounced Little-tone-ians)
Lochbuie	Lochbuie	Lochbuians
Log Lane Village	Log Lane Village	Log Lane Villagers
Lone Tree	Lone Tree	Lone Treers
Longmont	Longmont	Longmonter, Longmonster, Longmartian
Louisville	Louisville	Louisvillagers
Loveland	Loveland	Lovelanders
Lyons	Lyons	Lyonsites
Manassa	Manassa	Manassans
Mancos	Mancos	
Manitou Springs	Manitou	
Manzanola	Manzanola	Manzanolans
Marble	Marble	
Mead	Mead	
Meeker	Meeker	Meekerites
Merino	Merino	Merinoans
Milliken	Milliken	Millikenites
Minturn	Minturn	Minturnites
Moffat	Moffat	Moffatites
Monte Vista	Monte Vista	Monte Vistans
Montezuma	Montezuma	Motezumsters
Montrose	Montrose	Montrosians
Monument	Monument	
Morrison	Morrison	Morrisonites
Mount Crested Butte	Mount Crested Butte	
Mountain View	Mountain View	Mountain Viewers
Mountain Village	Mountain Village	Mountain Villagers
Naturita	Naturita	Naturitans
Nederland	Nederland	Nederlanders
New Castle	New Castle	New Castilians
Northglenn	Northglenn	Northglennites
Norwood	Norwood	Norwoodsters
Nucla	Nucla	Nuclans
Nunn	Nunn	Nunnians
Oak Creek	Oak Creek	Oak Creekers
Olathe	Olathe	
Olney Springs	Olney	
Ophir	Ophir	Ophirites
Orchard City	Orchard City	Orchard Citians
Ordway	Ordway	Ordwayans
Otis	Otis	Otisites
Ouray	Ouray	Ourayan
Ovid	Ovid	Ovidites
Pagosa Springs	Pagosa	Pagosans
Palisade	Palisade	Palisaders
Palmer Lake	Palmer Lake	Palmer Lakers
Paoli	Paoli	Paolians
Paonia	Paonia	Paonians
Parachute	Parachute	Parachuters
Parker	Parker	Parkerites
Peetz	Peetz	
Pierce	Pierce	
Pitkin	Pitkin	Pitkinites
Platteville	Platteville	Plattevillagers
Poncha Springs	Poncha Springs	Poncha Springers
Pritchett	Pritchett	
Pueblo	Pueblo	Pueblan
Ramah	Ramah	
Rangely	Rangely	
Raymer	Raymer	Raymerites
Red Cliff	Red Cliff	Red Cliffers
Rico	Rico	
Ridgway	Ridgway	Ridgwayans
Rifle	Rifle	Riflers
Rockvale	Rockvale	Rockvalites
Rocky Ford	Rocky Ford	Rocky Forders
Romeo	Romeo	
Rye	Rye	
Saguache	Saguache	Saguachians
Salida	Salida	Salidans
San Luis	San Luis	
Sanford	Sanford	Sanfordites
Sawpit	Sawpit	Sawpiters
Sedgwick	Sedgwick	Sedgwickians
Seibert	Seibert	Seibert
Severance	Severance	
Sheridan	Sheridan	Sheridanites
Sheridan Lake	Sheridan Lake	Sheridan Lakers
Silt	Silt	
Silver Cliff	Silver Cliff	Silver Cliffers
Silver Plume	Silver Plume	Silver Plumers
Silverthorne	Silverthorne	Silverthorners
Silverton	Silverton	Silvertonians
Simla	Simla	Simlans
Snowmass Village	Snowmass Village	Snowmass Villagers
South Fork	South Fork	South Forkers
Springfield	Springfield	Springfielders
Starkville	Starkville	Starkvillagers
Steamboat Springs	Steamboat	Steamboaters
Sterling	Sterling	
Stratton	Stratton	Strattonites
Sugar City	Sugar City	Sugar Citians
Superior	Superior	Superiorites
Swink	Swink	Swinksters
Telluride	Telluride	Telluridians
Thornton	Thornton	Thorntonites
Timnath	Timnath	Timnathians
Trinidad	Trinidad	Trinidadians
Two Buttes	Two Buttes	
Vail	Vail	Vailites
Victor	Victor	Victorites
Vilas	Vilas	
Vona	Vona	Vonans
Walden	Walden	Waldenites
Walsenburg	Walsenburg	Walsenburgers
Walsh	Walsh	
Ward	Ward	
Wellington	Wellington	Wellingtonites
Westcliffe	Westcliffe	Westcliffians
Westminster	Westminster	Westminsterites
Wheat Ridge	Wheat Ridge	Wheat Ridgers
Wiggins	Wiggins	Wiggers
Wiley	Wiley	Wileyans
Williamsburg	Williamsburg	Williamsburgers
Windsor	Windsor	Windsorites
Winter Park	Winter Park	Winter Parkers
Woodland Park	Woodland Park	Woodland Parkers
Wray	Wray	Wrayans
Yampa	Yampa	Yampans
Yuma	Yuma	Yumans

== See also ==
- Bibliography of Colorado
- Geography of Colorado
- History of Colorado
- Index of Colorado-related articles
- List of Colorado-related lists
- Outline of Colorado
