= Florence High =

Florence High may refer to:

- United States Penitentiary, Florence High
- Florence High School (disambiguation)
