= Florence High School =

Florence High School may refer to:

- Florence High School (Alabama), Florence, Alabama
- Florence High School (Arizona), Florence, Arizona
- Florence Junior/Senior High School, Florence, Colorado
- Florence High School — Florence, Kansas, closed, merged with Marion High School
- Florence High School (Mississippi), Florence, Mississippi
- Florence High School (South Dakota) — Florence, South Dakota
- Florence High School (Texas), Florence, Texas
- Florence High School (Wisconsin), Florence, Wisconsin
- Florence Bertell Academy of Prince George's County — Capitol Heights, Maryland
- Florence Crittenton Alternative School — Lexington, Kentucky
- Florence Crittenton School, Fullerton, California
- Florence Township Memorial High School, Florence, New Jersey
- Florence Unified School — Florence, Arizona
- Florence-Carlton High School, Florence, Montana
- South Florence High School, Florence, South Carolina
- West Florence High School, Florence, South Carolina
