= Fremont School District RE-2 =

School district in Colorado, United States

Location
- 403 West 5th Street Florence, Colorado, 81226; United States
- Coordinates: 38°23′40″N 105°7′17″W

Other information
- Website: Official website

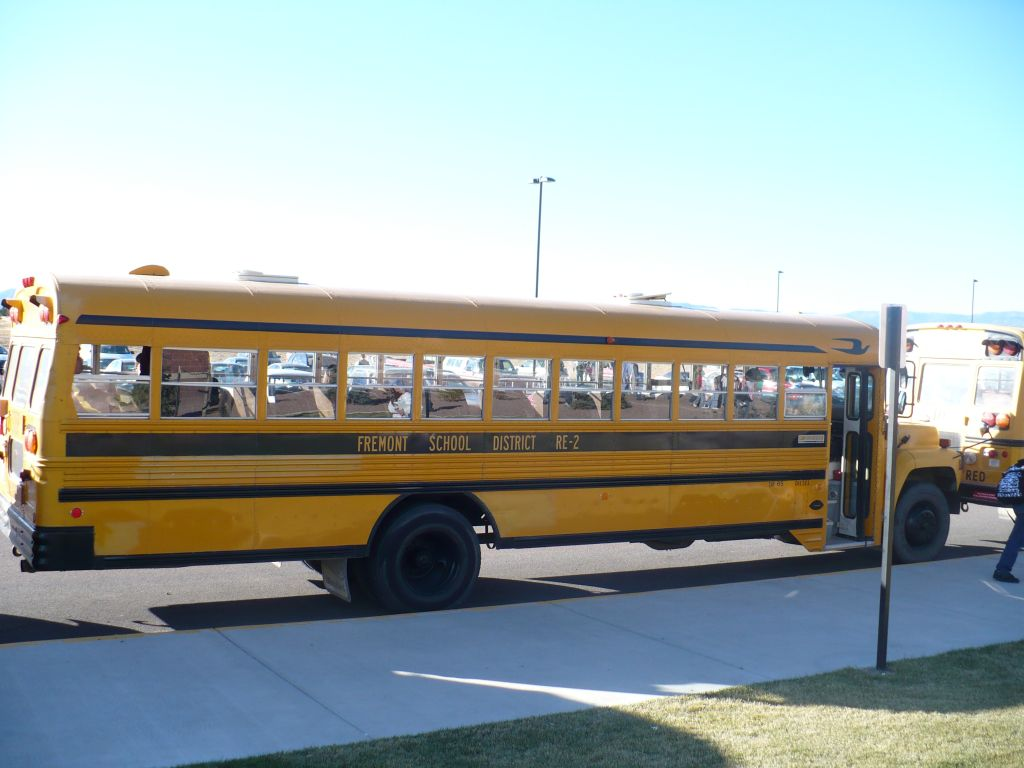
Fremont RE-2 School District School Bus

The Fremont RE-2 School District is a school district headquartered in Florence, Colorado. It serves Florence and Penrose. In 2022, the district's 220 teachers, administrators, and support staff taught and supported 1,426 students in preschool through 12th grade.

Most of the district is in Fremont County, and includes the municipalities of Florence, Coal Creek, Rockvale, and Williamsburg, as well as the Penrose census-designated place. A portion extends into El Paso County.

== Schools ==
- Florence Junior/Senior High School
- Fremont Elementary School
- Penrose Elementary School
