= Oil Spring =

- U.S. National Register of Historic Places
- Nearest city: Cañon City
- Area: 2.6 acres (1.1 ha)
- NRHP reference No.: 96000043
- Added to NRHP: February 16, 1996

Oil Spring is a historic site near Cañon City, Colorado that was a shallow oil seep where the first commercial oil production took place in Colorado. Primarily active from 1860 to 1881, it produced one to three barrels of oil per day at its peak. Alternatively known as Oil Spring Claim on Four Mile Creek, it was listed on the National Register of Historic Places in 1996.

A 160-acre (0.65 km^{2}) property including Oil Spring was claimed by Gabriel Bowen on September 3, 1860, although research by Donald Kupfer noted that there were spurious, competitive claims about first discovery. Bowen intended to exploit the oil to form Colorado's first oil company, G Bowen & Co.. This was only one year after the first commercial oil well in the United States, the Drake Well in Pennsylvania, was drilled.

The spring was only viable for twenty years once the Florence Oil Field was discovered and began operation. The NRHP-listed property is just a 2.6 acres (1.1 ha) portion of Bowen's original 160 acre claim.

== Donald H. Kupfer ==
Donald H. Kupfer (Oct. 4, 1918 -Nov. 20, 2010) was instrumental in creating increasing recognition of the Oil Spring site and conducted some of the oil samples to establish the history. He was a geology professor at Louisiana State University for 25 years. He was recipient of various honors for his accomplishments: among other honors he was a Fellow of the American Association for the Advancement of Science American Association for the Advancement of Science, the 1974 recipient of the Leverson Award of the American Association of Petroleum Geologists and the 1997 Outstanding Educator Award of the Gulf Coast Association of Geological Societies. He was married to another geologist, Romaine (Littlefield) Kupfer, and, after his retirement in 1980, they moved together to Canon Springs in 1983. Kupfer died in 2010 in Powell, Wyoming at age 92.

== See also ==
- National Register of Historic Places listings in Colorado
