= Florence Junior/Senior High School =

Location
- 2006 Highway 67; Florence, Colorado 81226; United States
- Coordinates: 38°24′27″N 105°6′41″W

Information
- Former name: Florence High School
- School type: Public high school
- School district: Fremont RE-2
- CEEB code: 060580
- NCES School ID: 080396000514
- Principal: Dan Melendrez
- Teaching staff: 35.09 (on an FTE basis)
- Grades: 7–12
- Enrollment: 592 (2023–2024)
- Student to teacher ratio: 16.87
- Colors: Royal blue and gold
- Athletics conference: CHSAA
- Mascot: Husky
- Website: fhs.re-2.org

Florence Junior/Senior High School, formerly Florence High School, is a public high school in unincorporated Fremont County, Colorado, United States, near Florence. It is part of the Fremont RE-2 School District.

== History ==
In May 2015, Robert Basevitz, a former teacher, filed a lawsuit against Principal Schipper, superintendent of the school district Rhonda Vendetti, and the school district itself, accusing them of promoting Christianity in the school. Schipper said that the accusations were not true.

Florence High school merged with the district's middle school, Fremont Middle School, beginning in the 2019–2020 school year. The middle school was closed primarily due to concerns over the building's inaccessibility to the handicapped. The building of the school was purchased by Unbridled Holdings for $515,000.
