= Carbonate, Colorado =

Ghost town in Garfield County, CO, USA

- Statutory town
- Town of Carbonate
- Location of the Town of Carbonate, Colorado. Carbonate (Colorado)
- Coordinates: 39°44′50″N 107°20′17″W
- Country: United States
- State: Colorado
- County: Garfield
- Founded: 1879
- Incorporated: April 13, 1883

Government
  - Type: Statutory town

Area
  - Total: 1.006 sq mi (2.605 km^{2})
  - Land: 0.992 sq mi (2.569 km^{2})
  - Water: 0.014 sq mi (0.036 km^{2})
- Elevation: 10,926 ft (3,330 m)

Population (2020)
  - Total: 0
- Time zone: UTC−07:00 (MST)
  - Summer (DST): UTC−06:00 (MDT)
- GNIS town ID: 2803717
- FIPS code: 08-12080

The Town of Carbonate is a statutory town and an extinct silver mining camp located in Garfield County, Colorado, United States. As of the 2020 census, Carbonate had a population of 0. Founded in 1879, Carbonate was designated the original seat of Garfield County from its creation on February 10, 1883, until voters moved the county seat to Glenwood Springs later that year. The Carbonate, Colorado, post office operated from April 13, 1883, until November 15, 1886. Carbonate has had no year-round population since the 1890 Census due to its severe winter weather and difficulty of access.

== History ==
Carbonate was founded as a silver camp in 1879. On February 10, 1883, Colorado created Garfield County and designated Carbonate as the original county seat. The Town of Carbonate incorporated on April 13, 1883, and the Carbonate, Colorado, post office opened the same day. Carbonate's location high in the Flat Tops mountains made access difficult. After a few months, the Garfield County seat was moved to Glenwood Hot Springs. As the silver played out, miners departed. The Carbonate post office closed on November 15, 1886. By 1890, no residents remained.

On November 4, 2014, the property owners of Carbonate voted to reactivate the town government despite the population being 0 since the 1890 United States census, making it the smallest town in the state of Colorado. The town has summer visitors but no permanent residents, making it the only active incorporated municipality in Colorado with no permanent population.

== Geography ==
Carbonate is in the Flat Tops mountains, 13.4 miles (21.5 km) north of Glenwood Springs.

At the 2020 United States census, the town had a total area of 644 acres (2.605 km^{2}) including 8.9 acres (0.036 km^{2}) of water.

== Demographics ==
Carbonate has been continuously uninhabited since the 1890 United States census.

Historical population
Census	Pop.	Note	%±
1890	0		—
1900	0		—
1910	0		—
1920	0		—
1930	0		—
1940	0		—
1950	0		—
1960	0		—
1970	0		—
1980	0		—
1990	0		—
2000	0		—
2010	0		—
2020	0		—
U.S. Decennial Census

== Education ==
It is in the Eagle County School District RE 50.

== See also ==
- Rifle, CO Micropolitan Statistical Area
