= Florence, Colorado =

Statutory city in Fremont County, Colorado, United States

- Statutory city
- City of Florence
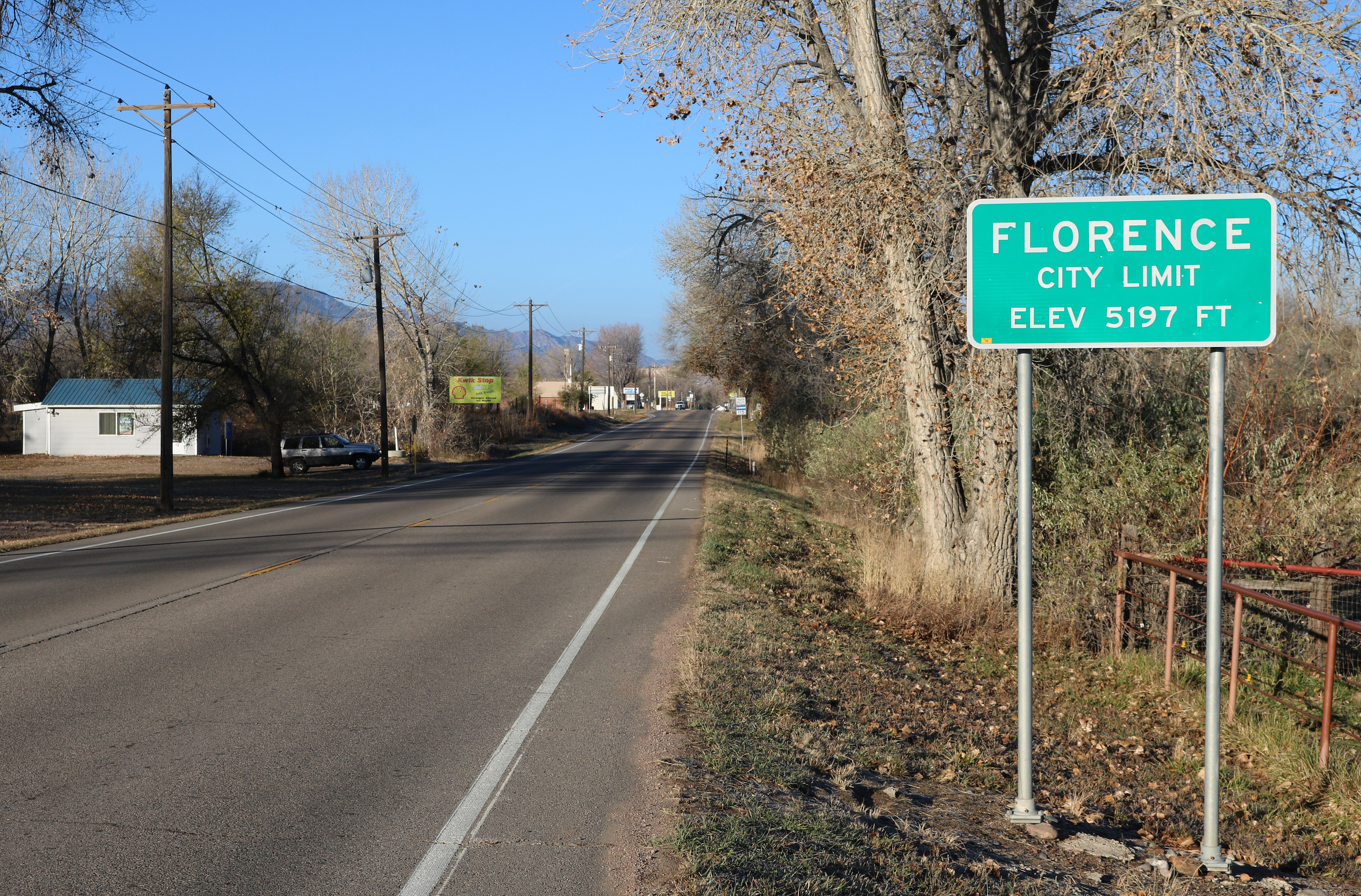
- Entering Florence from the east on Colorado State Highway 115.

- Flag

- Location of the City of Florence in Fremont County, Colorado
- Coordinates: 38°22′50″N 105°07′12″W
- Country: United States
- State: Colorado
- County: Fremont
- Incorporated: September 13, 1887

Government
  - Type: Statutory city
  - Mayor: Steve Wolfe, Mayor-elect
  - City Manager: Amy Nasta
  - City Clerk: Cortlyne Huppe

Area
  - Total: 4.282 sq mi (11.091 km^{2})
  - Land: 4.276 sq mi (11.076 km^{2})
  - Water: 0.0058 sq mi (0.015 km^{2})
- Elevation: 5,181 ft (1,579 m)

Population (2020)
  - Total: 3,822
  - Density: 894/sq mi (345/km^{2})
- Time zone: UTC−07:00 (MST)
  - Summer (DST): UTC−06:00 (MDT)
- ZIP codes: 81226 and 81290
- Area code: 719
- GNIS city ID: 2410510
- FIPS code: 08-7040
- Website: www.cityofflorenceco.gov

Florence is a statutory city located in Fremont County, Colorado, United States. The city population was 3,822 at the 2020 United States census. Florence is a part of the Cañon City, CO Micropolitan Statistical Area and the Front Range Urban Corridor.

The city lies along the Arkansas River in eastern Fremont County. It is near Federal Correctional Complex, Florence, a major U.S. federal prison complex that includes a supermax prison, ADX Florence.

== History ==
Florence was built as a transportation center, with three railroads including a small railroad depot for the trains that hauled coal from the neighboring towns of Rockvale and Coal Creek. After a small oil discovery north of Canon City at Oil Spring, commercial quantity oil was discovered near Florence in 1862, Florence became the first significant oil center west of the Mississippi.

The Florence, Colorado Territory, post office opened on May 8, 1873, and the Town of Florence was incorporated on September 13, 1887. The city was named after Florence, the daughter of local settler James McCandless. After incorporation, the town grew rapidly.

The Downtown Florence Historic District was listed on the National Register of Historic Places in 2017.

== Geography ==
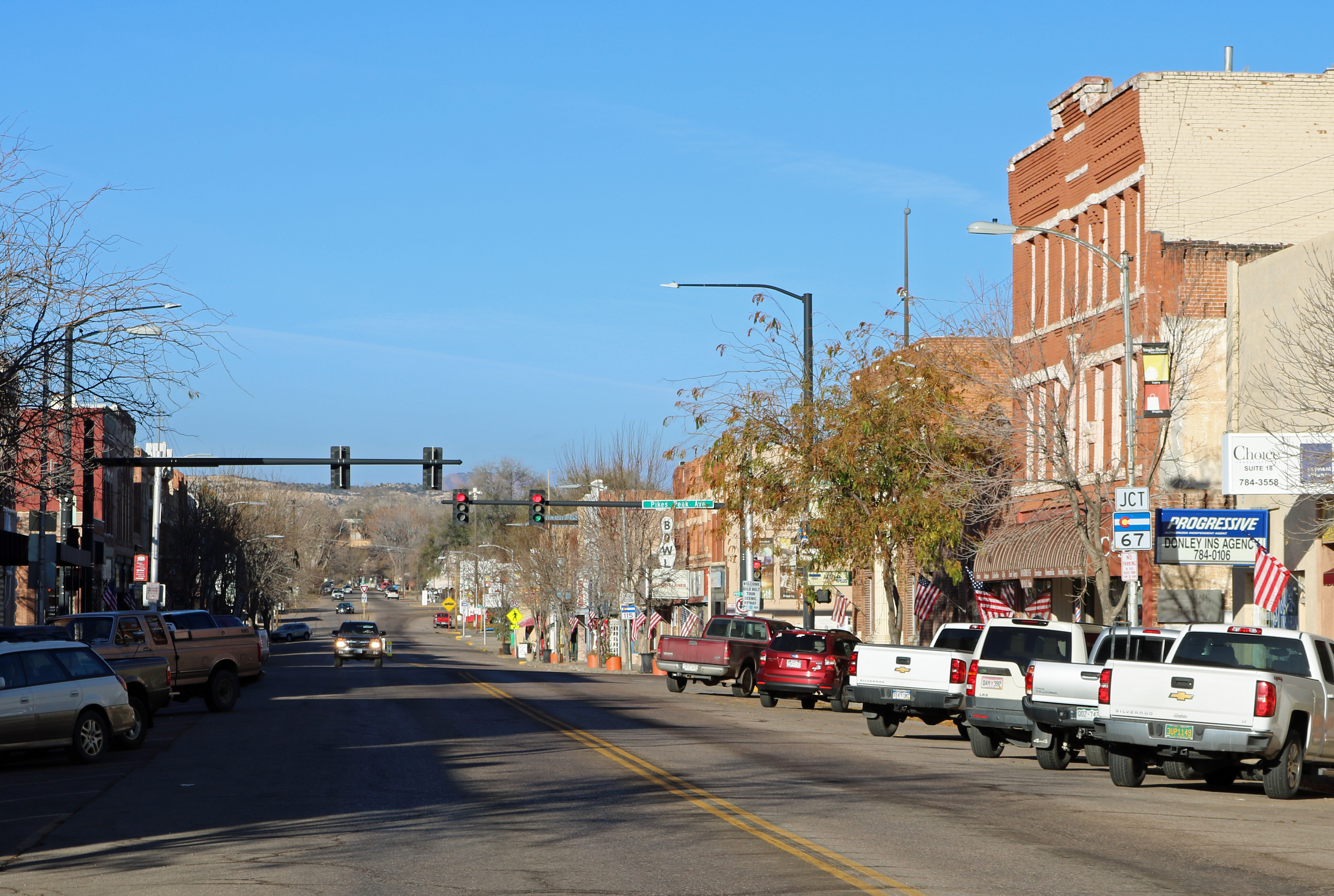
Downtown Florence, in 2017

Florence is located in eastern Fremont County, on the south side of the Arkansas River. It is bordered to the west by the town of Williamsburg, and the town of Coal Creek is 3 miles (5 km) to the southwest. Colorado State Highway 115 runs northwest 9 miles (14 km) to Cañon City and northeast 6 miles (10 km) to Penrose, intersecting U.S. Route 50 in each direction. Colorado State Highway 67 leads north 3.5 miles (5.6 km) to US 50 and south 11 miles (18 km) to Wetmore. Pueblo is 33 miles (53 km) to the east via CO 115 and US 50.

At the 2020 United States census, the town had a total area of 2,741 acres (11.091 km^{2}) including 3.7 acres (0.015 km^{2}) of water.

Florence sits in the semi-arid high desert lands of southern Colorado.

== Demographics ==
Historical population
Census	Pop.	Note	%±
1900	3,728		—
1910	2,712		−27.3%
1920	2,629		−3.1%
1930	2,475		−5.9%
1940	2,632		6.3%
1950	2,773		5.4%
1960	2,821		1.7%
1970	2,846		0.9%
1980	2,987		5.0%
1990	2,990		0.1%
2000	3,653		22.2%
2010	3,881		6.2%
2020	3,822		−1.5%
U.S. Decennial Census

=== 2020 census ===
As of the 2020 census, Florence had a population of 3,822. The median age was 45.0 years. 20.6% of residents were under the age of 18 and 23.1% of residents were 65 years of age or older. For every 100 females there were 98.3 males, and for every 100 females age 18 and over there were 97.7 males age 18 and over.

0.0% of residents lived in urban areas, while 100.0% lived in rural areas.

There were 1,604 households in Florence, of which 27.1% had children under the age of 18 living in them. Of all households, 40.3% were married-couple households, 22.9% were households with a male householder and no spouse or partner present, and 29.8% were households with a female householder and no spouse or partner present. About 33.5% of all households were made up of individuals and 15.6% had someone living alone who was 65 years of age or older.

There were 1,750 housing units, of which 8.3% were vacant. The homeowner vacancy rate was 2.5% and the rental vacancy rate was 8.5%.

Racial composition as of the 2020 census
Race	Number	Percent
White	3,081	80.6%
Black or African American	26	0.7%
American Indian and Alaska Native	58	1.5%
Asian	23	0.6%
Native Hawaiian and Other Pacific Islander	0	0.0%
Some other race	160	4.2%
Two or more races	474	12.4%
Hispanic or Latino (of any race)	530	13.9%

=== 2000 census ===
As of the 2000 census, there were 3,653 people, 1,488 households, and 973 families residing in the city. The population density was 897.7 inhabitants per square mile (346.6/km^{2}). There were 1,622 housing units at an average density of 398.6 per square mile (153.9/km^{2}). The racial makeup of the city was 92.77% White, 0.30% African American, 1.23% Native American, 0.30% Asian, 2.63% from other races, and 2.76% from two or more races. Hispanic or Latino of any race were 15.66% of the population.

There were 1,488 households, out of which 31.8% had children under the age of 18 living with them, 49.4% were married couples living together, 11.6% had a female householder with no husband present, and 34.6% were non-families. 30.8% of all households were made up of individuals, and 13.8% had someone living alone who was 65 years of age or older. The average household size was 2.43 and the average family size was 3.03.

In the city, the population was spread out, with 27.5% under the age of 18, 7.0% from 18 to 24, 27.9% from 25 to 44, 21.2% from 45 to 64, and 16.5% who were 65 years of age or older. The median age was 36 years. For every 100 females, there were 92.0 males. For every 100 females age 18 and over, there were 86.8 males.

The median income for a household in the city was $29,628, and the median income for a family was $39,276. Males had a median income of $33,750 versus $22,042 for females. The per capita income for the city was $14,969. About 12.5% of families and 17.6% of the population were below the poverty line, including 23.0% of those under age 18 and 11.3% of those age 65 or over.

== Government ==
Federal Correctional Complex, Florence, including USP Florence ADMAX, the only federal supermax prison in the United States, is located near Florence in unincorporated Fremont County.

== Education ==
Fremont RE-2 School District operates public schools, including Penrose Elementary School, Florence Elementary School and Florence Junior/Senior High School.

== Notable person ==
- Thyra Thomson, Wyoming Secretary of State

== See also ==
- Cañon City, CO Micropolitan Statistical Area
- Pueblo-Cañon City, CO Combined Statistical Area
