= Coal Creek, Colorado =

Statutory town community in Fremont County, Colorado, United States

- Statutory town
- Town of Coal Creek
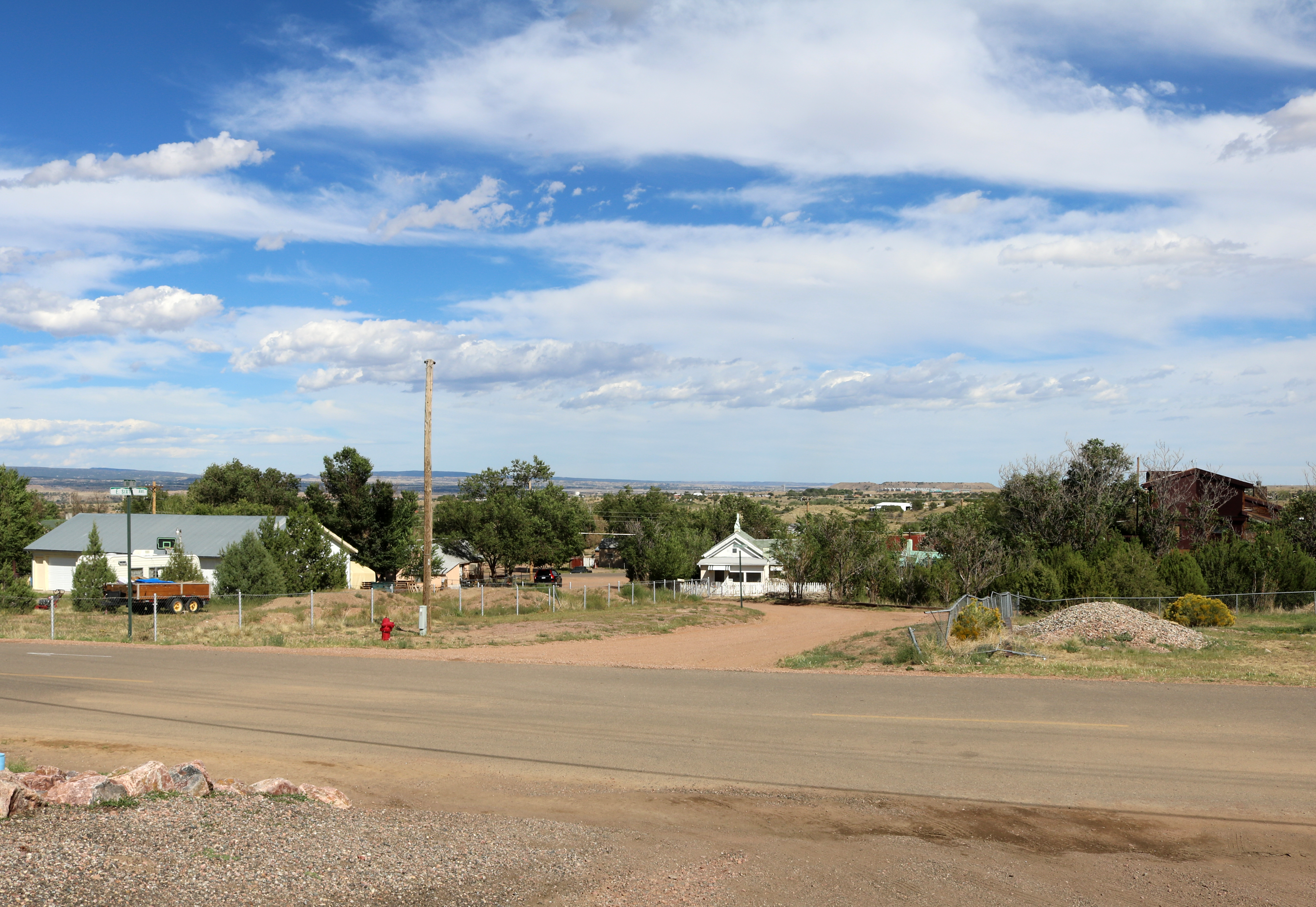
- Looking across Main Street from the town hall in Coal Creek

- Location of the Town of Coal Creek in Fremont County, Colorado
- Coordinates: 38°22′06″N 105°08′22″W
- Country: United States
- State: Colorado
- County: Fremont
- Incorporated: February 11, 1882

Government
  - Type: Statutory town

Area
  - Total: 1.194 sq mi (3.092 km^{2})
  - Land: 1.194 sq mi (3.092 km^{2})
  - Water: 0 sq mi (0.000 km^{2})
- Elevation: 5,427 ft (1,654 m)

Population (2020)
  - Total: 364
  - Density: 305/sq mi (118/km^{2})
- Time zone: UTC−07:00 (MST)
  - Summer (DST): UTC−06:00 (MDT)
- ZIP code: 81221
- Area code: 719
- GNIS town ID: 2413219
- FIPS code: 08-15330
- Website: townofcoalcreek.net

The Town of Coal Creek is a statutory town located in Fremont County, Colorado, United States. The town population was 364 at the 2020 United States Census. Coal Creek is a part of the Cañon City, CO Micropolitan Statistical Area and the Front Range Urban Corridor.

== History ==
The Coal Creek, Colorado Territory, post office opened on November 4, 1873. The community was named for the local coal mining industry. The Town of Coal Creek was incorporated on February 11, 1882. The spelling of the post office was changed to Coalcreek, on May 31, 1894, but the spelling was changed back to Coal Creek on July 1, 1964.

== Geography ==
Coal Creek is located in southeastern Fremont County. The town of Rockvale is to the west, Williamsburg is to the northwest, and the city of Florence is to the northeast.

At the 2020 United States Census, the town had a total area of 764 acres (3.092 km^{2}), all of it land.

== Demographics ==
Historical population
Census	Pop.	Note	%±
1900	698		—
1910	676		−3.2%
1920	618		−8.6%
1930	435		−29.6%
1940	261		−40.0%
1950	195		−25.3%
1960	206		5.6%
1970	225		9.2%
1980	190		−15.6%
1990	157		−17.4%
2000	303		93.0%
2010	343		13.2%
2020	364		6.1%
U.S. Decennial Census

As of the census of 2000, there were 303 people, 114 households, and 76 families residing in the town. The population density was 307.9 inhabitants per square mile (118.9/km^{2}). There were 125 housing units at an average density of 127.0 per square mile (49.0/km^{2}). The racial makeup of the town was 94.72% White, 0.66% African American, 0.33% Asian, 0.99% from other races, and 3.30% from two or more races. Hispanic or Latino of any race were 1.98% of the population.

There were 114 households, out of which 37.7% had children under the age of 18 living with them, 48.2% were married couples living together, 14.9% had a female householder with no husband present, and 32.5% were non-families. 27.2% of all households were made up of individuals, and 14.0% had someone living alone who was 65 years of age or older. The average household size was 2.66 and the average family size was 3.25.

In the town, the population was spread out, with 31.4% under the age of 18, 5.0% from 18 to 24, 28.1% from 25 to 44, 24.8% from 45 to 64, and 10.9% who were 65 years of age or older. The median age was 37 years. For every 100 females, there were 91.8 males. For every 100 females age 18 and over, there were 84.1 males.

The median income for a household in the town was $26,563, and the median income for a family was $29,583. Males had a median income of $17,500 versus $21,250 for females. The per capita income for the town was $12,563. About 14.3% of families and 18.6% of the population were below the poverty line, including 28.3% of those under the age of eighteen and none of those 65 or over.

== Education ==
It is in the Fremont RE-2 School District.

== See also ==
- Cañon City, CO Micropolitan Statistical Area
- Pueblo-Cañon City, CO Combined Statistical Area
