= Mount Crested Butte, Colorado =

Town in Colorado, United States

- Home rule town
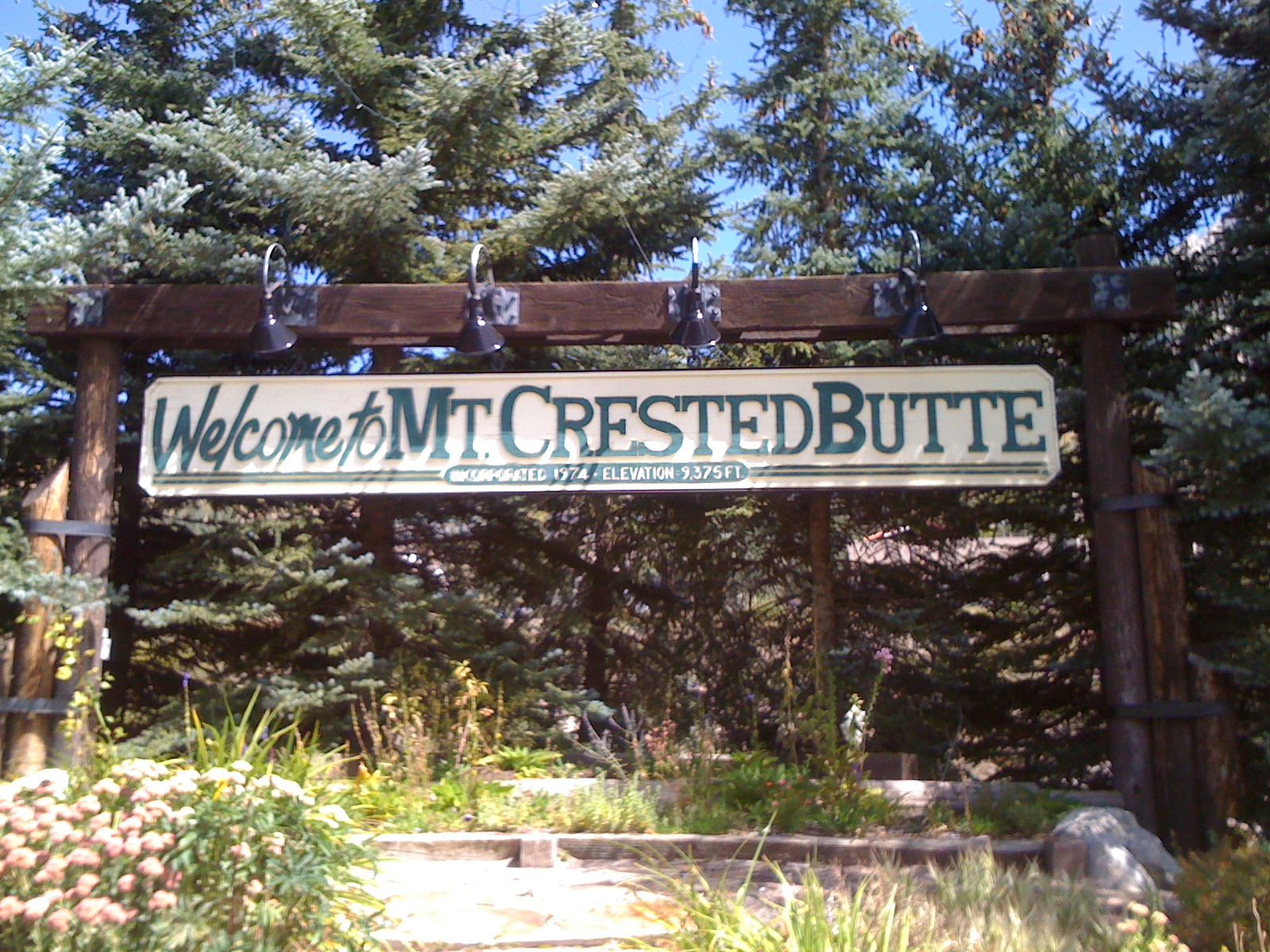
- Welcome to Mt. Crested Butte, elevation 9,375 feet (2,858 m)

- Location of Mount Crested Butte in Gunnison County, Colorado.
- Coordinates: 38°54′30″N 106°57′38″W
- Country: United States
- State: Colorado
- County: Gunnison
- Incorporated (town): 1973

Government
  - Type: Home rule municipality

Area
  - Total: 2.05 sq mi (5.30 km^{2})
  - Land: 2.05 sq mi (5.30 km^{2})
  - Water: 0 sq mi (0.00 km^{2})
- Elevation: 9,738 ft (2,968 m)

Population (2020)
  - Total: 941
  - Density: 460/sq mi (178/km^{2})
- Time zone: UTC-7 (MST)
  - Summer (DST): UTC-6 (MDT)
- ZIP code: 81225 (Crested Butte PO Box)
- Area code: 970
- FIPS code: 08-52570
- GNIS feature ID: 2413018
- Website: mtcb.colorado.gov

Mount Crested Butte is a home rule municipality in Gunnison County, Colorado, United States. Mount Crested Butte is the home of the Crested Butte Mountain Resort. The population was 941 at the 2020 census. ZIP code 81225 serves post office boxes for Mount Crested Butte and for neighboring Crested Butte; mail must be addressed to Crested Butte.

== Geography ==
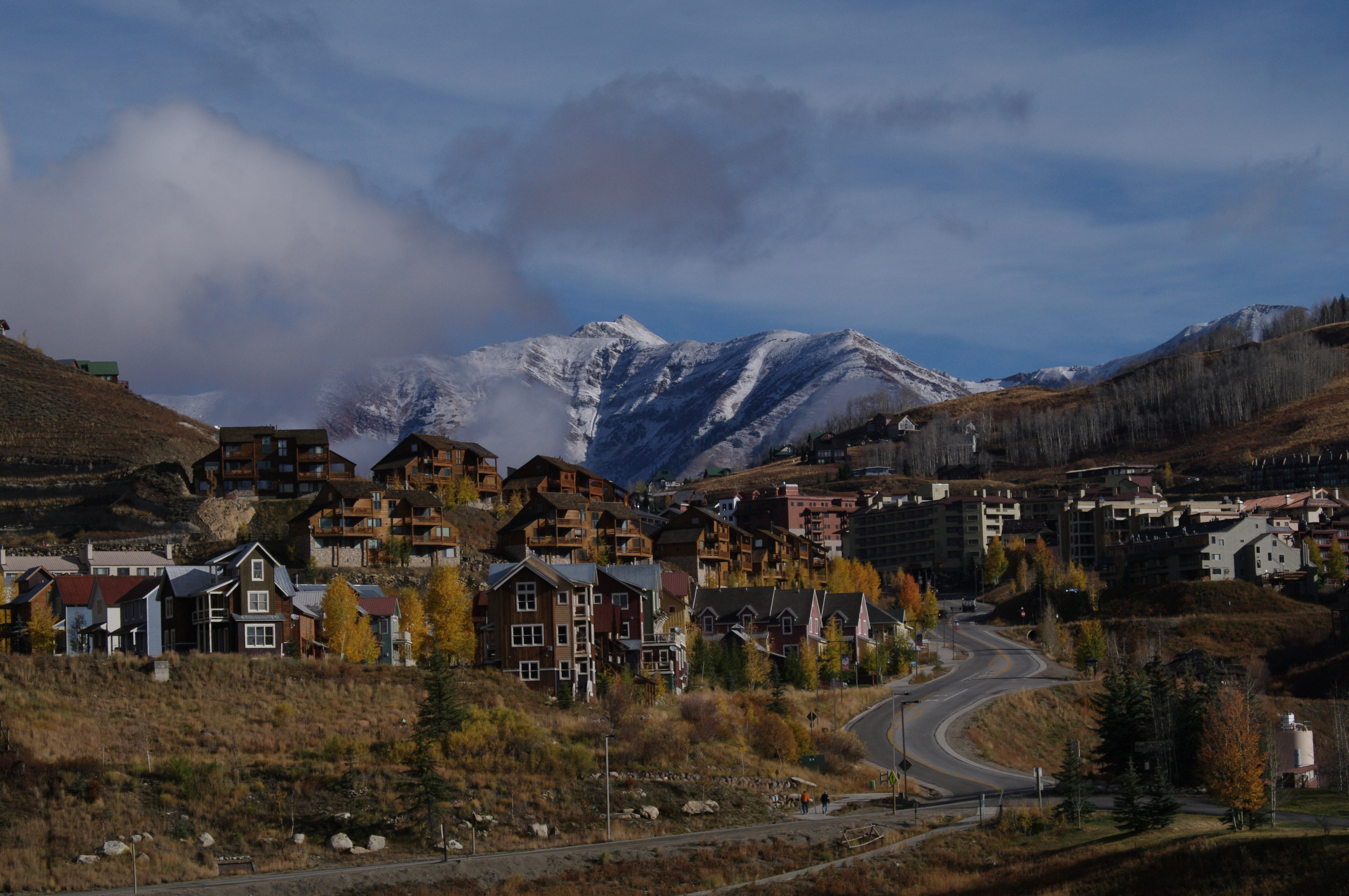
Mt. Crested Butte

Mt. Crested Butte is in north-central Gunnison County in the Gunnison National Forest, 2 miles (3 km) north of the town of Crested Butte on Gothic Road. The town sits at the northern and western base of Crested Butte, a 12,162-foot (3,707 m) summit that is the site of the Crested Butte Mountain Resort.

According to the United States Census Bureau, the town of Mt. Crested Butte covers a total area of 2.22 square miles (5.75 km^{2}), all of it land.

== Demographics ==
Historical population
Census	Pop.	Note	%±
1980	272		—
1990	264		−2.9%
2000	707		167.8%
2010	801		13.3%
2020	941		17.5%
U.S. Decennial Census

== See also ==
- West Elk Mountains
