= Rockvale, Colorado =

Town in Fremont County, Colorado, United States

- Town
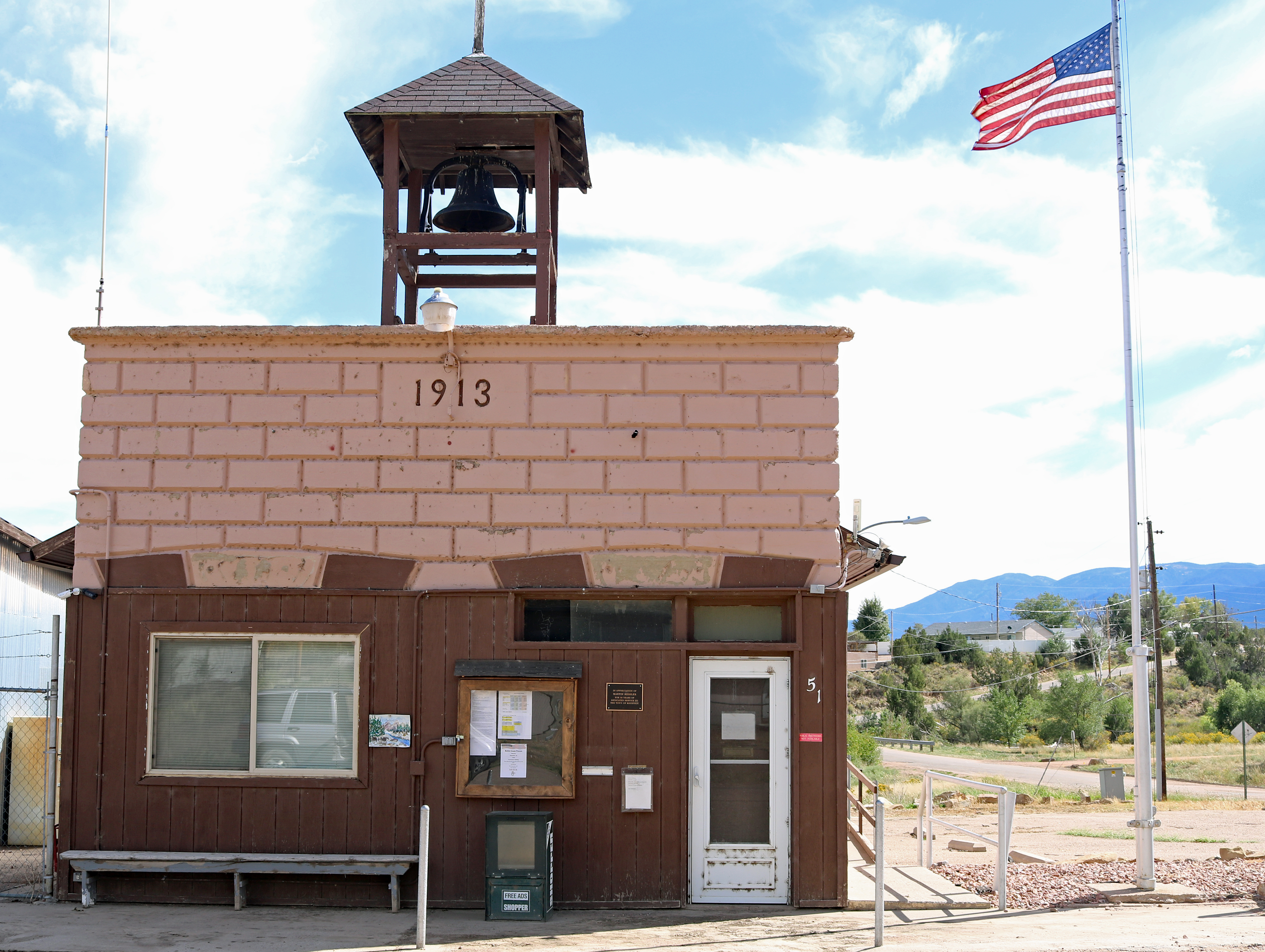
- Rockvale's town hall on Railroad St.

- Flag Seal

- Coordinates: 38°22′14″N 105°09′51″W
- Country: United States
- State: Colorado
- County: Fremont
- Incorporated (town): September 30, 1886

Government
  - Type: Statutory town

Area
  - Total: 2.04 sq mi (5.28 km^{2})
  - Land: 2.04 sq mi (5.28 km^{2})
  - Water: 0 sq mi (0.00 km^{2})
- Elevation: 5,463 ft (1,665 m)

Population (2020)
  - Total: 511
  - Density: 251/sq mi (96.8/km^{2})
- Time zone: UTC-7 (Mountain (MST))
  - Summer (DST): UTC-6 (MDT)
- ZIP code: 81244 (PO Box)
- Area code: 719
- FIPS code: 08-64970
- GNIS feature ID: 2412564
- Website: Official website

Rockvale is a statutory town in Fremont County, Colorado, United States. The population was 511 at the 2020 census.

== Geography ==
Rockvale is located in southeastern Fremont County and is bordered to the north by the town of Williamsburg. The town of Coal Creek is to the east.

According to the United States Census Bureau, the town of Rockvale has a total area of 1.9 square miles (5.0 km^{2}), all of it land.

== Demographics ==
Historical population
Census	Pop.	Note	%±
1900	870		—
1910	1,413		62.4%
1920	1,249		−11.6%
1930	710		−43.2%
1940	575		−19.0%
1950	380		−33.9%
1960	413		8.7%
1970	359		−13.1%
1980	338		−5.8%
1990	321		−5.0%
2000	426		32.7%
2010	487		14.3%
2020	511		4.9%

== Education ==
It is in the Fremont RE-2 School District.

== See also ==
- List of municipalities in Colorado
