= Williamsburg, Colorado =

Town in Fremont County, Colorado, United States

- Statutory town
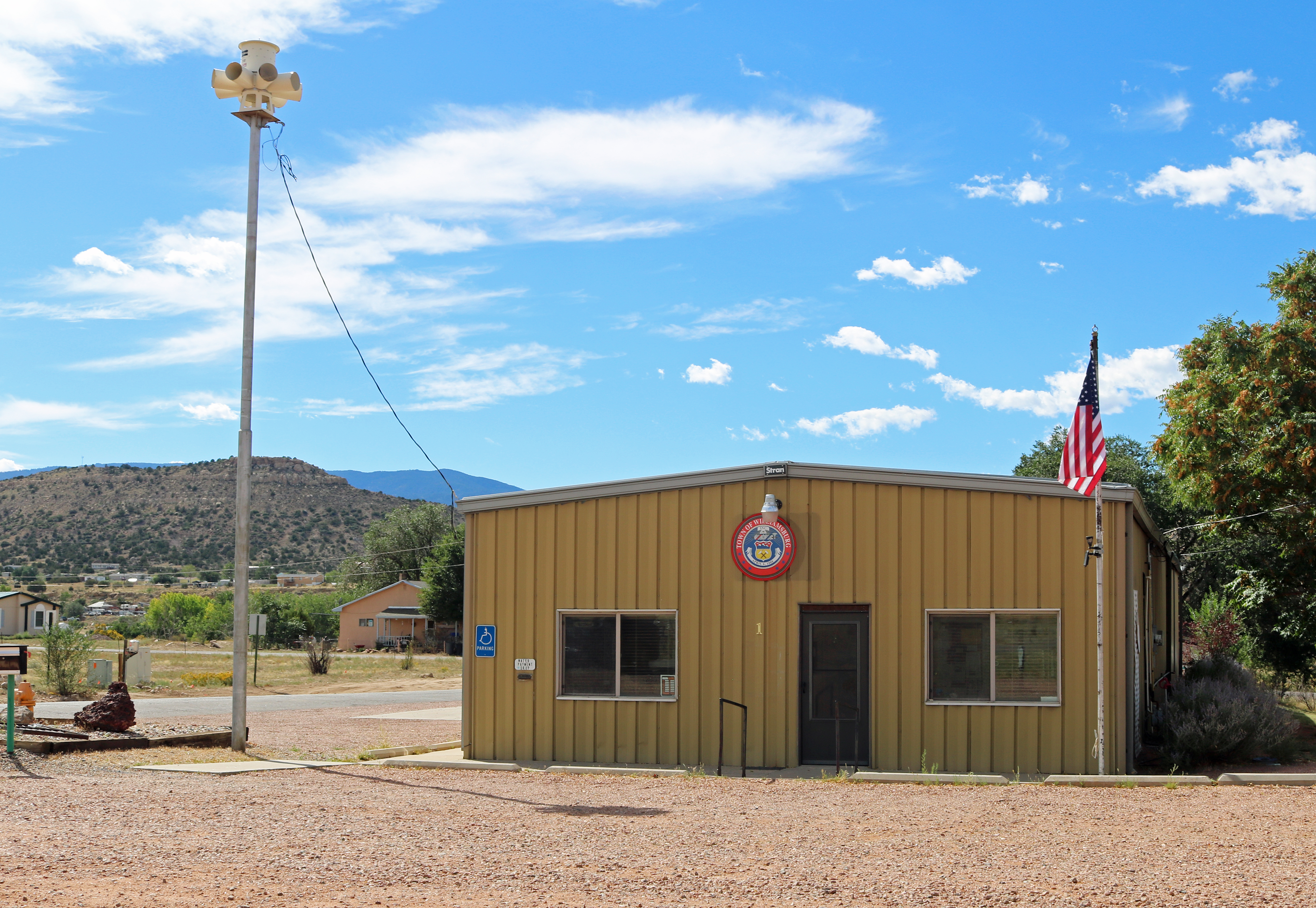
- The town hall on John Street, September 2018

- Location of Williamsburg in Fremont County, Colorado.
- Coordinates: 38°22′48″N 105°10′23″W
- Country: United States
- State: Colorado
- County: Fremont
- Incorporated: April 7, 1888

Government
  - Type: Statutory town

Area
  - Total: 3.53 sq mi (9.15 km^{2})
  - Land: 3.53 sq mi (9.15 km^{2})
  - Water: 0 sq mi (0.00 km^{2})
- Elevation: 5,390 ft (1,640 m)

Population (2020)
  - Total: 731
  - Density: 207/sq mi (79.9/km^{2})
- Time zone: UTC-7 (Mountain (MST))
  - Summer (DST): UTC-6 (MDT)
- ZIP code: 81226
- Area code: 719
- FIPS code: 08-85155
- GNIS feature ID: 2413490
- Website: townofwilliamsburg.colorado.gov

Williamsburg is a statutory town located in Fremont County, Colorado, United States. The town population was 731 at the 2020 census. The Florence post office (ZIP code 81226) serves Williamsburg.

== Geography ==
Williamsburg is located in southeastern Fremont County. It is bordered to the east by the city of Florence and to the south by the town of Rockvale. Cañon City, the county seat, is 8 miles (13 km) to the northwest.

According to the United States Census Bureau, Williamsburg has a total area of 3.6 square miles (9.2 km^{2}), all of it land.

== Education ==
It is in the Fremont RE-2 School District.

== Demographics ==
Historical population
Census	Pop.	Note	%±
1900	337		—
1910	556		65.0%
1920	402		−27.7%
1930	155		−61.4%
1940	97		−37.4%
1950	65		−33.0%
1960	57		−12.3%
1970	75		31.6%
1980	72		−4.0%
1990	253		251.4%
2000	714		182.2%
2010	662		−7.3%
2020	731		10.4%
U.S. Decennial Census

== See also ==
- List of municipalities in Colorado
