= Early history of Fremont County, Colorado =

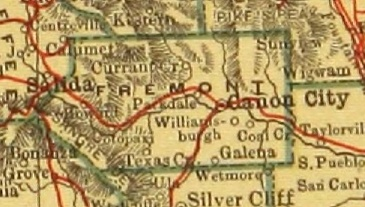
Map of Fremont County, Colorado. The Arkansas River, one of the longest rivers in the United States, crosses through the center of the county. In southwestern Fremont county, the river is just north of the Sangre de Cristo Mountains. The altitude of the river descends as it moves east to the plains in eastern Fremont County. North of the river are the Front Range mountains.

Early history of Fremont County, Colorado includes Native Americans, such as the Ute people, and later the establishment of the Colorado Territory by European explorers and settlers.

Paleo-Indians came into the Arkansas River Valley of Fremont County, Colorado more than 10,000 years ago and left evidence of their being there. About 700 years ago, Ute people began to inhabit present-day Cañon City area during the winter months at the hot springs along the Arkansas River. Plains tribes, like the Arapaho, Comanche, Kiowa, and Cheyenne, and Pueblo people also hunted in the area. As European American settlers established themselves, the Utes continued to come to the area and had a peaceful existence with its residents. After 1863, the Ute were pushed to the Western Slope and then onto Ute Mountain Indian Reservation in southwestern Colorado in the Four Corners region and the Southern Ute Indian Reservation in southern Colorado.

In 1540, explorer Francisco Vázquez de Coronado claimed the area for Spain. Zebulon Pike explored the Arkansas River area in Colorado in 1806. Part of the Stephen H. Long's Expedition of 1820, included travel from the Canadian River to the Arkansas River. John C. Frémont, whom the county is named after, traveled the Arkansas River area in 1844. On a survey expedition for a railroad in 1848, Frémont traveled to Hardscrabble Creek (near the former settlement of Hardscrabble), Mosca Pass over the Sangre de Cristo Mountains, to the San Luis Valley.

The Fort Le Duc trading post was established in the 1830s. From 1844 to 1845, a trading post, an early farming settlement, and cattle ranch supported 70 people at Hardscrabble. European Americans moved into Fremont County in 1859 during the Pike's Peak gold rush.

== Native peoples ==
=== Paleo-Indians ===
Starting more than 10,000 years ago, Paleo-Indians (11,500 to 7,500 years ago) camped in the present-day Cañon City area in Fremont County. Evidence of Paleo-Indians habitation includes fire pits, animal bones, and stone tools, generally projectile points used in hunting. Archaeological sites in Fremont County, particularly around Cañon City, held evidence of Native American habitation, including portable skin tents, wooden articles, hearths, and evidence of stone tool manufacturing. Four Fremont County wilderness areas—Lower Grape Creek, Upper Grape Creek, McIntyre Hills, and portions of Beaver Creek—were studied for archaeological evidence of prehistoric life with negligible findings.

=== Ute people ===
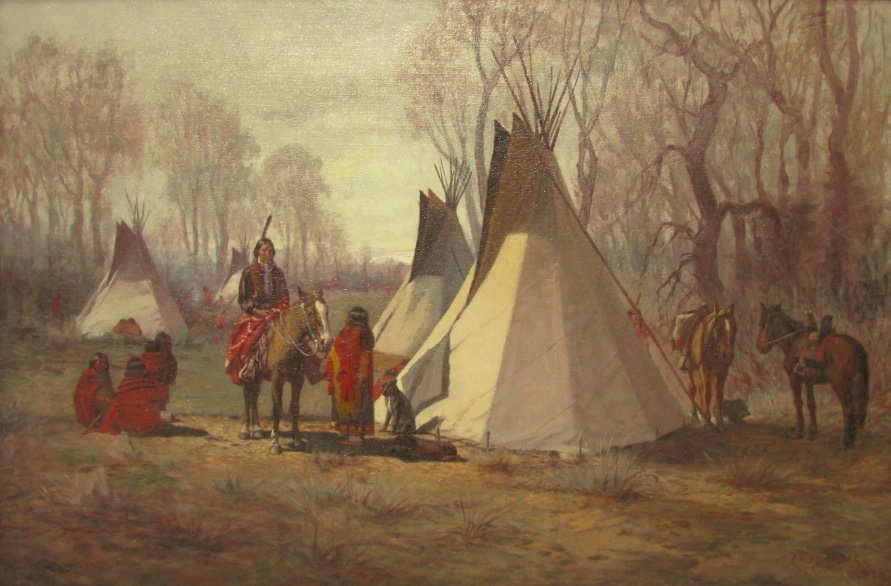
Charles Craig, Uncompahgre Ute Indian Camp, 1893, Denver Art Museum

Ute people spent time seasonally in the area 700 years before Europeans appeared. They favored the mountains and visited the Arkansas Valley area during seasonal treks to the plains. Utes hunted buffalo, visited the Soda Springs, and camped nearby. They drank the spring water for its healing properties. One of the city's parks, Temple Canyon, about 30 by 70 feet (9.1 by 21.3 m), would have been accessed after a hike along Grape Creek. A legend states that Blackfeet and Ute warriors fought at the canyon to marry a maiden. It is reportedly the site of a battle between U.S. soldiers and Ute people.

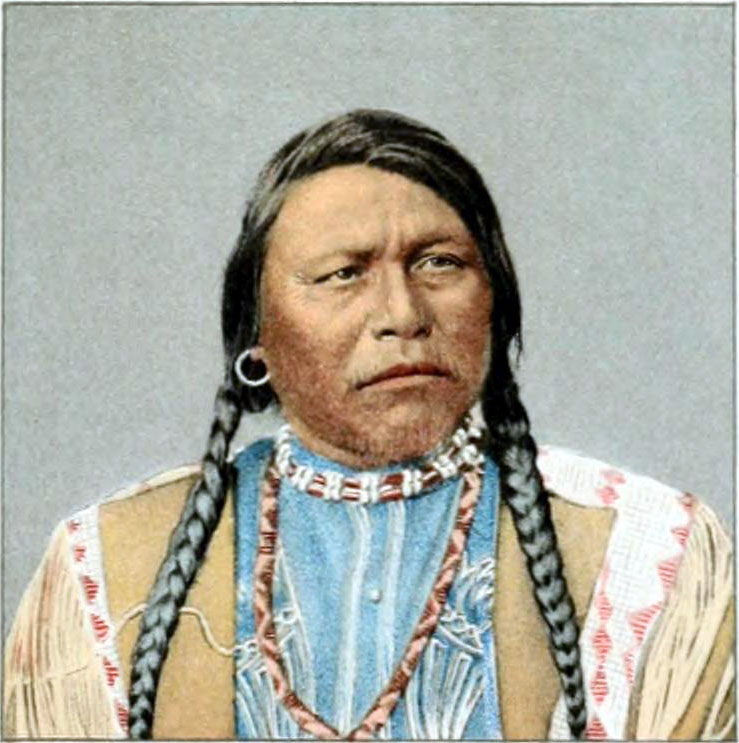
Chief Ouray

The Tabeguache band of the Uncompahgre Utes, including Chief Ouray and Chipeta, spent the winters at Cañon City due to its hot springs and mild weather. Dakota Hot Springs are located between Cañon City and Penrose. Hot springs are considered sacred to the Utes. As Cañon City was settled, Utes continued to come to the area where they camped. They were on good terms with the settlers. Ute chief Colorow was a friend of Otto Morganstein, the first settler of Red Canyon Park, north of Cañon City. Ouray had dinners with local residents and was a friend of Richard Houle of Red Canyon.

=== Plains and Pueblo people ===
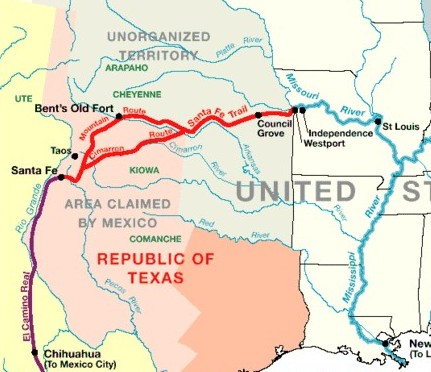
Santa Fe Trail and native tribal lands in 1845. The Santa Fe Trail paralleled the Arkansas River for much of its route through southern Colorado. It became the dividing line between the Comanche and Kiowa, south of the river, and the Cheyenne and Arapaho north of the river. The Cheyenne had a winter camp on along the Arkansas River on Mountain Route of the Santa Fe called Big Timbers

Plains cultures—including Arapaho, Comanche, Kiowa, and Cheyenne people—visited and hunted the area, as did Pueblo people. By the mid-1600s, the Arapaho left the Great Lakes region for the Great Plains. They moved west and met up with the Cheyenne, who left the Great Lakes area later than the Arapaho, in the Black Hills. The tribes, whose languages were Algonquian languages, developed an alliance and moved south into eastern Colorado, traveling between the North Platte River and the Arkansas River by 1810. By 1835, some of the Arapaho split off from a group that remained in norther Colorado and lived along the Arkansas River. They would meet the northern Arapaho along the South Platte River periodically and intermarry. The Kiowas moved into Colorado from the north and east around 1760, pressured south by the Arapaho and Cheyenne. About 30 years later, Kiowas and Comanches joined forces, after a period of fighting each other, and moved through Colorado across the Arkansas River and into the southern Great Plains.

=== Fruit-growers ===
Fremont County has been a fruit-growing area of Colorado at least since settlement during territorial days, and perhaps before than when Native Americans managed peach and apple orchards in Colorado for generations, after apples and peaches were brought to the New World by the Spanish conquistadors and missionaries.

When European-Americans began to settle in Colorado, Native American peach orchards were destroyed by American armies to starve and displace Indigenous peoples. Following the Tabeguache Treaty in 1863, Utes were moved west of the Continental Divide of the Rocky Mountains to the Western Slope. Utes were later forcibly removed to reservations: Ute Mountain Indian Reservation in southwestern Colorado in the Four Corners region and the Southern Ute Indian Reservation in southern Colorado.

== Nuevo Mexico ==
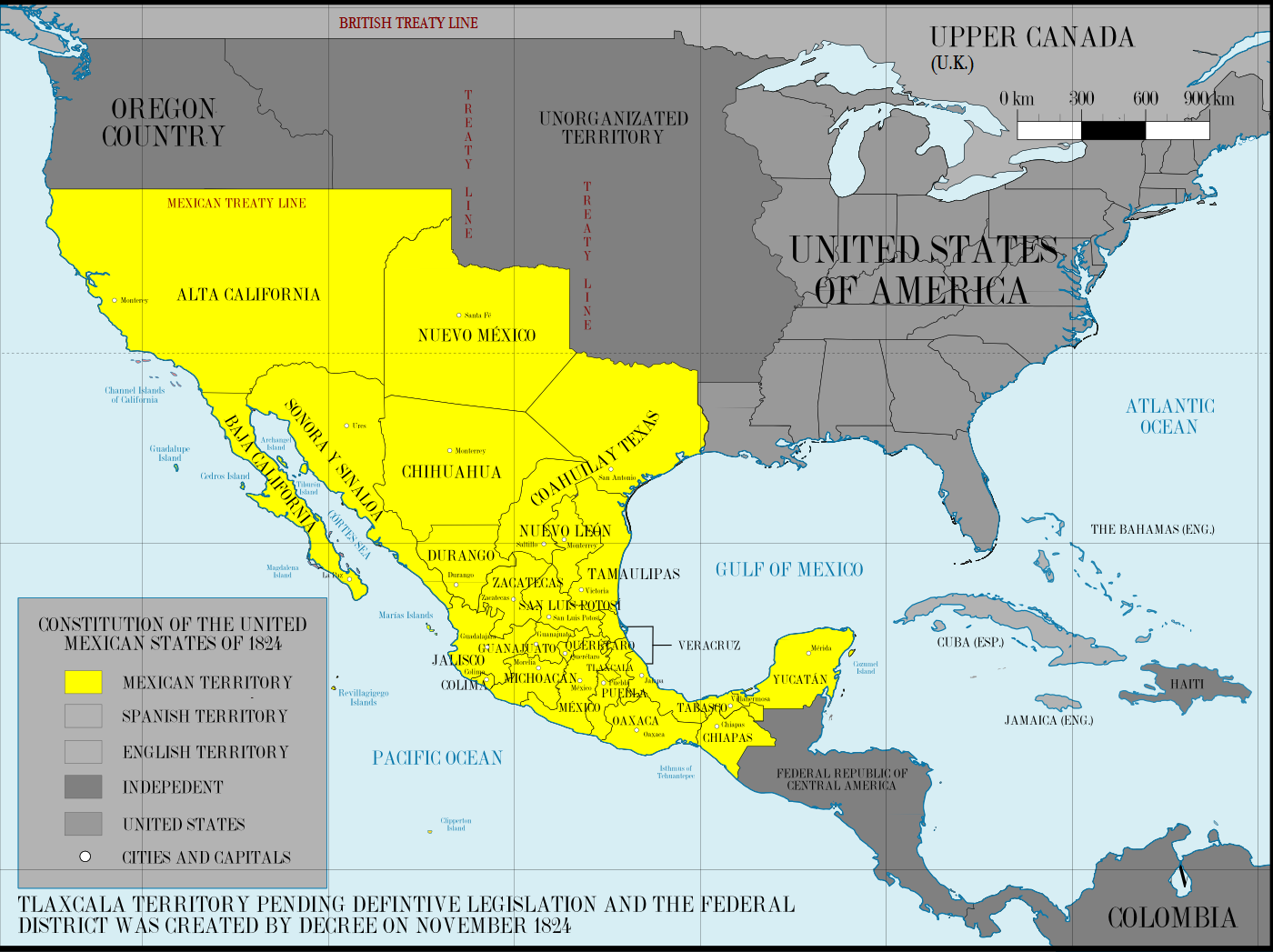
Map of Mexico in 1824 showing the province of Nuevo México

In 1540, explorer Francisco Vázquez de Coronado claimed the area for Spain that became the frontier of New Spain. Spain established a permanent colony called Nuevo Mexico, also called Santa Fe de Nuevo México, in 1598. The land extended from present-day Mexico north into the upper Rio Grande valley, was colonized by missionaries intending to convert indigenous people and men in search of gold. The Spanish explored into the center of North America, and extended their territory beyond present-day New Mexico and into Colorado, Oklahoma, and the southern Plains of Texas. By the 18th century, the territory extended into the Colorado River basin and what is present-day California.

Hardscrabble Creek The valley of Rio Peñasco Amarillo, now called Hardscrabble Creek, was farmed by a group of people from Nuevo Mexico each year. After harvesting their crops, they returned to their villages in the south for the winter. By the 18th century, Comanches centralized south into the southern Plains, where they dominated the area. The Plains Apaches and Utes were driven out of the southern Plains. Armed with weapons from the French, the Comanche also dominated the Spanish on the southern Plains. The farmers left the Rio Peñasco Amarillo valley, escaping the threat of hostile Native Americans, until a military garrison was established by the United States.

== Explorers ==
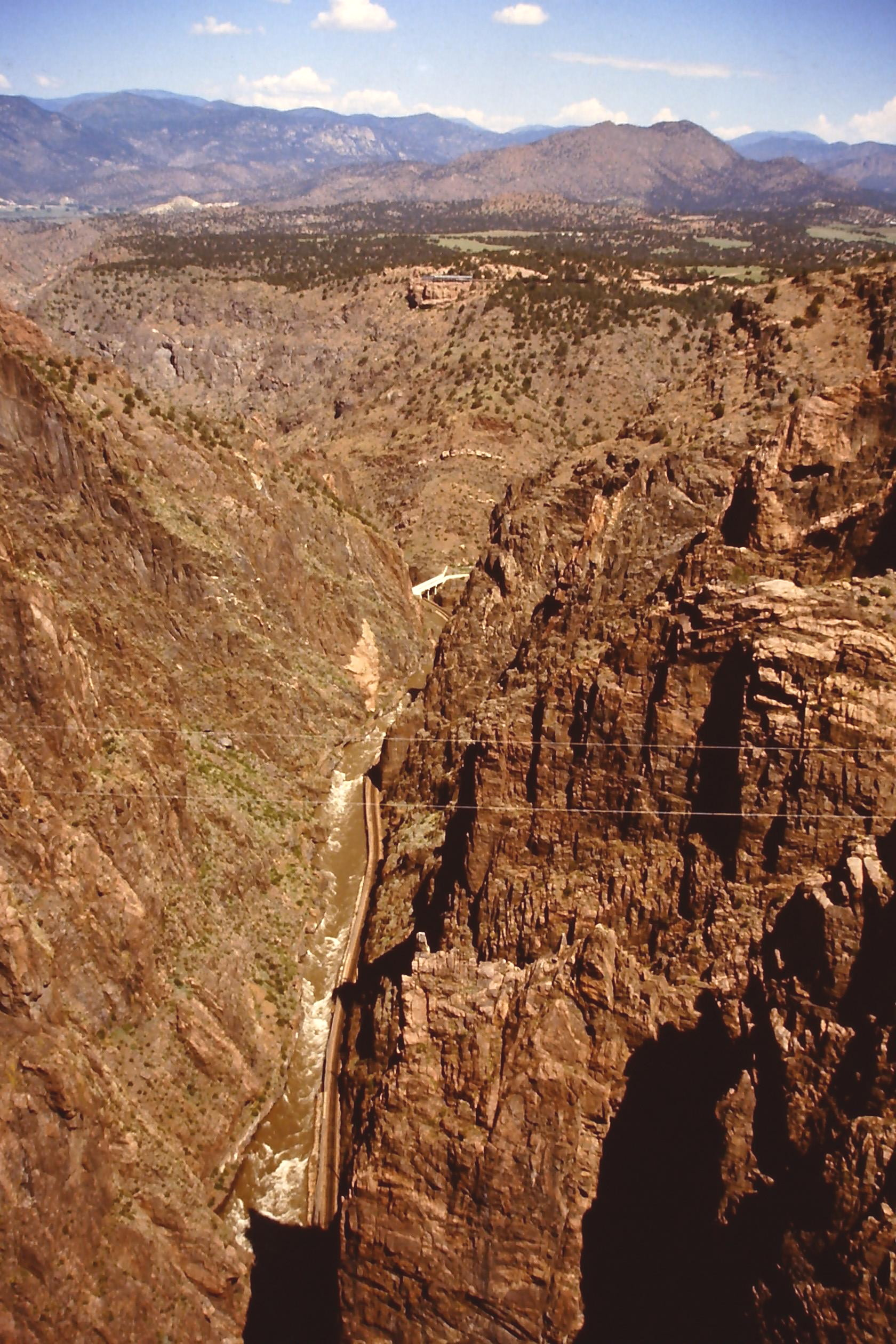
Arkansas River through Royal Gorge near Cañon City that would have been seen by the explorers

Zebulon Pike explored the Arkansas River area in Colorado in 1806. On December 5, 1806, Pike and his expedition set up camp at the east side of Royal Gorge. The men found hot springs in the gorge on the south side of the river on December 8. Pike wrote in his journal about a spring where he built a blockhouse of logs for his company in December that year. Unable to find their way out of the gorge, Pike and his company took a Ute trail to South Park along Four Mile Creek. After a month, they ended back at their camp at the mouth of the gorge. They constructed a building to hold most of their baggage. It was likely the first building constructed by white men in Fremont County. Two men stayed behind with the tired horses, while Pike and his party walked south along Grape Creek, across the Sangre de Cristo Mountains, and into the San Luis Valley of Colorado. They were met by some Spanish men who held Pike for trespassing. In 1819, a boundary line was established at the Arkansas River by the United States and Spain by the Adams–Onís Treaty (the land south and west of the border was the Viceroyalty of New Spain). The treaty put the land south of the Arkansas River of present-day Fremont County in Spanish territory.

Captain John R. Bell, a military officer, and Dr. Edwin James, a multi-disciplinary scientist, set off on July 18, 1820, from the confluence of Fountain Creek and the Arkansas River (Pueblo, Colorado) and traveled northwest up the Arkansas to present-day Cañon City. Part of the Stephen H. Long's Expedition of 1820, they traveled with two other men. The four came to the eastern mouth of the Royal Gorge canyon, but did not find the blockhouse built by the Pike's expedition 14 years earlier. Seven springs, named Bell's Springs (Canon City Hot Springs) by the explorers, are located at the eastern mouth of the Royal Gorge. They traveled roughly west up the gorge, but could not find a way out. Pike had had the same problem.

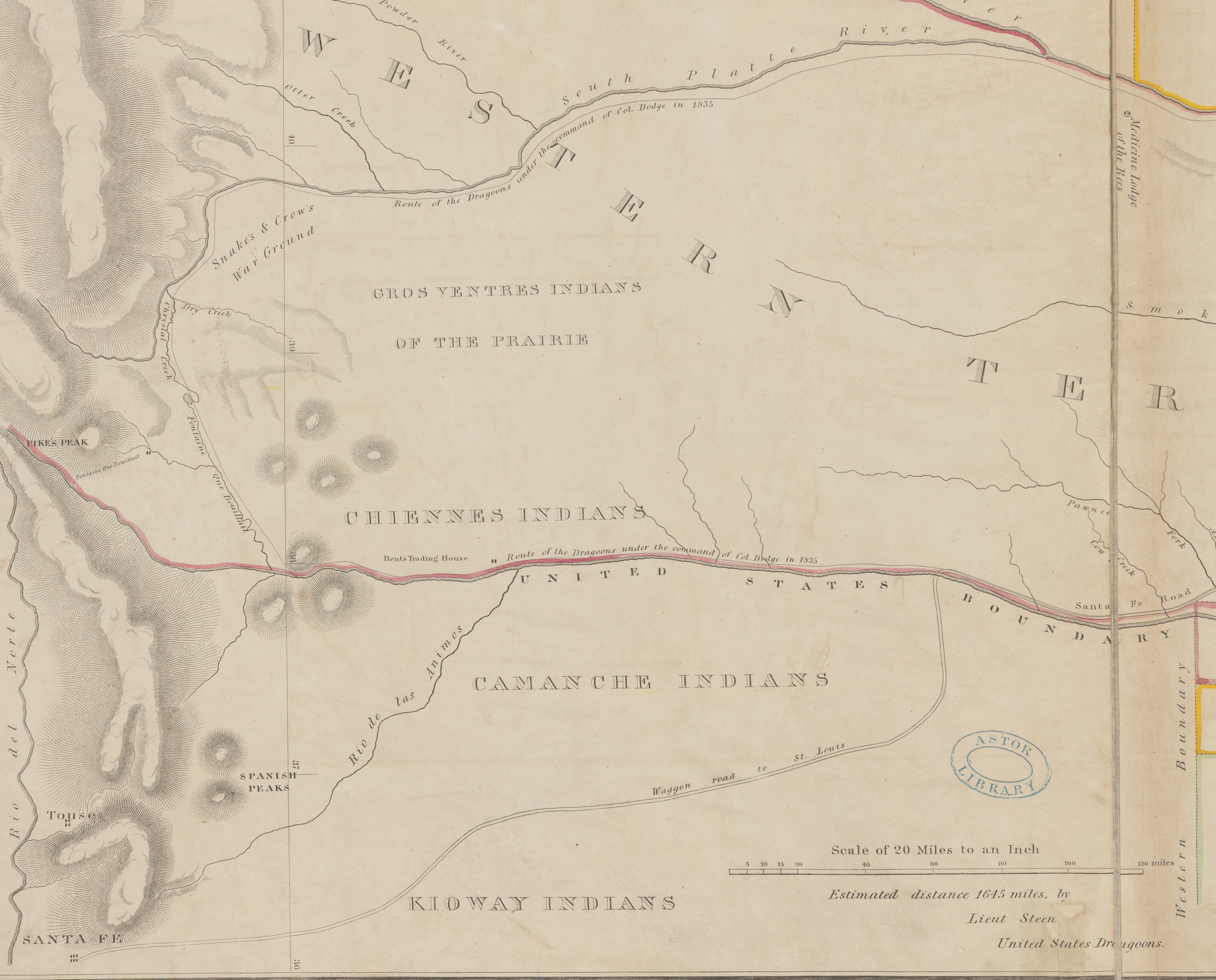
Map of First Dragoon Expedition of 1835, led by Col. Henry Dodge. This portion of the map reflects the route along the Arkansas River. Cañon City and the Hardscrabble Creek are roughly south of Pikes Peak.

John Gannt, an area mountain man and trading post operator, served as a guide for Col. Henry Dodge during the First Dragoon Expedition of 1835. In late July of that year, they came to the Rio Peñasco Amarillo (now Hardscrabble Creek) at the Arkansas River where there was an encampment of Arapaho people with 50 to 60 lodges. Some of the Arapaho people were on a buffalo hunting expedition with the Cheyenne. Gannt rode to the plains to find them and brought several Arapaho tribal leaders to Bent's Fort (on the Arkansas River in southeastern Colorado) on August 10 for a counsel with Dodge and other Native America tribal leaders. The purpose of the discussion was to ask the leaders not to fight white people and to enter into and uphold treaties.

John C. Frémont, sent on a series of expeditions from 1842 to 1848 by the United States government, traversed the Arkansas River area in 1844. The Mexican Cession, following the Mexican American War, returned the land south of the Arkansas River to the United States and present-day Fremont County.

On a survey expedition for a railroad in 1848, Frémont traveled to Hardscrabble Creek (near Hardscrabble), Mosca Pass over the Sangre de Cristo Mountains, to the San Luis Valley. Eleven men were lost in the San Juan Mountains.

== Fur traders ==
William Bent is reported to have built the first trading post, a picket outpost, in Fremont County along the Arkansas River about the winter of 1829. If so, it was the "first commercial establishment in the present State of Colorado". Bent is said to have hid and saved two Cheyennes being chased by Comanches at his outpost, which may have been on the north bank of the Arkansas River, west of present-day Portland, near the mouth of Hardscrabble Creek. Trading posts were established at Fort Le Duc in the 1830s and Hardscrabble, an early farming settlement and cattle ranch to support 70 people who lived in placitas enclosed within an adobe wall, from 1844 to 1845. After traveling east to El Pueblo, Fremont County traders took the Trapper's Trail to Don Fernando de Taos and Santa Fe for trading.

== Gold rush ==
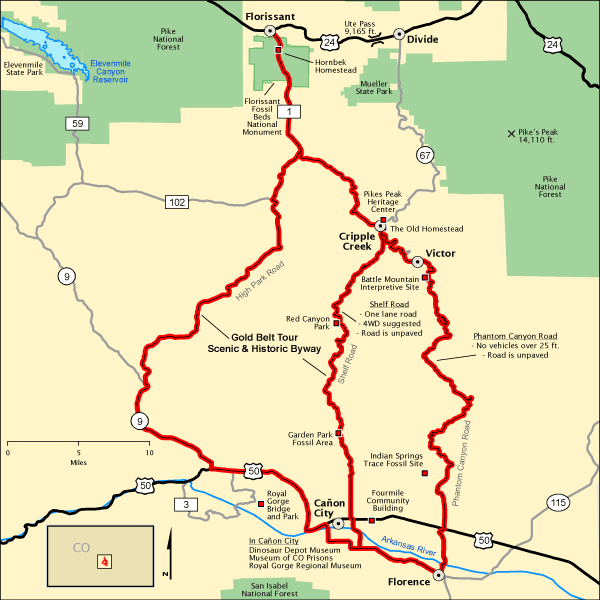
Gold Belt Tour Scenic and Historic Byway

The Pike's Peak gold rush brought people into Fremont County in 1859. One year later, The Cañon City Claim Club was platted. Using Native American trails, Joseph Lamb created a pack trail between Cañon City and Salida in 1860 to deliver supplies to placer mines. Within a few years, a wagon road was constructed along the Arkansas River between Cañon City and Salida.

== See also ==
- Prehistory of Colorado
- Garden Park, Colorado, a paleontological site
- Indian Springs Trace Fossil Natural Area, a National Natural Landmark, at Indian Springs Ranch
- Early history of the Arkansas Valley in Colorado, which includes counties east of Fremont County
