= Velazquez =

Velázquez
- Place of origin: Spain

Velázquez, also Velazquez, Velásquez or Velasquez (/vəˈlæskɛz/, /-ˈlæz-/), is a surname from Spain. It is a patronymic name, meaning "son of Velasco".

References to "Velazquez" without a first name are often to the Spanish painter, Diego Velázquez.

Notable people with this surname include:

== Arts ==
- Consuelo Velázquez, 20th-century Mexican songwriter, best known for "Bésame Mucho"
- Daniel Velazquez, Puerto Rican rock guitarist
- Diego Velázquez, Spaniard court painter to Philip IV of Spain, most famous for Las Meninas
- Diego Velazquez (actor), American TV and film child actor
- Héctor Velázquez Moreno, Mexican architect
- Valerie Velazquez American singer, philanthropist
- Jaci Velasquez, American contemporary Christian singer
- Lorena Velázquez (1937-2024), Mexican actress
- Mark Velasquez (born 1977), American photographer
- Nadine Velazquez, Puerto Rican-American actress and model
- Patricia Velásquez (born 1971), Venezuelan actress and model
- Regine Velasquez (born 1970), Filipina singer-songwriter, actress, and record producer
- Tony Velasquez (1910–1997), Filipino illustrator

== Politics ==
- Andrés Velásquez, Venezuelan politician
- David Höglund Velasquez (born 1989), Swedish politician
- Javier Velásquez (born 1960), prime minister of Peru
- Jessica Velasquez (born 1976 or 1977), American politician
- Luis Velásquez Alvaray (1954–2025), Venezuelan politician and lawyer
- Nydia Velázquez, American politician
- Ramón José Velásquez, ex-president of Venezuela (1993–1994)
- Tracy Velazquez, American politician
- Victoria Marina Velásquez (born 1943), Salvadoran jurist
- Victoria Velasquez (born 1991), Danish politician

== Religion ==
- David Andrés Álvarez-Velázquez, Bishop of the Diocese of Puerto Rico
- Rodrigo Arango Velásquez (1925–2008), Roman Catholic Bishop

== Sports ==
- Andrew Velazquez (born 1994), American professional baseball player
- Arly Velásquez, Mexican Paralympic alpine skier
- Alberto Velázquez (born 1934), Uruguayan cyclist
- Cain Velasquez (born 1982), Mexican American mixed martial arts fighter
- Carlos Velásquez (born 1984), Puerto Rican boxer
- Carlos Velázquez (footballer) (born 1984), Mexican footballer
- Carlos Velázquez (baseball) (1948–2000), Puerto Rican major league pitcher
- Claudia Velásquez (born 1975), Peruvian swimmer
- Claudio Velásquez (born 1986), Argentine football striker
- Cornelio Velásquez (born 1968), Panamanian jockey
- Édgar Velásquez (born 1974), Venezuelan boxer
- Emiliano Velázquez (born 1994), Uruguayan football defender
- Flor Velázquez (born 1984), Venezuelan judoka
- Francisco Velázquez (born 1975), former Argentine roller hockey player
- Frank Velásquez (born 1990), Salvadoran beach footballer
- Freddie Velázquez, Dominican Republic baseball player
- Gilberto Velásquez (born 1983), Paraguayan footballer
- Guillermo Velasquez (baseball) (born 1968), Mexican baseball player
- Héctor Velásquez (1952–2010), Chilean boxer
- Héctor Velázquez (baseball) (born 1988), Mexican baseball player
- Jorge Velásquez (born 1946), American horse racing jockey
- José Velásquez (footballer, born 1952) (born 1952), retired football midfielder from Peru
- José David Velásquez, Honduran footballer
- Juan Velásquez (born 1971), Peruvian footballer
- Julián Velásquez (1920-?), Argentine fencer
- Juliana Velasquez (born 1986), Brazilian professional mixed martial artist
- Luis Velásquez (1919–1997), Guatemalan long-distance runner
- Manuel Velazquez, 20th-century anti-boxing activist
- Marco Velásquez (born 1987), Chilean footballer
- Miguel Velasquez (born 1944), Spanish boxer
- Nelson Velázquez (born 1998), Puerto Rican baseball player
- Pablo Velázquez (born 1987), Paraguayan footballer
- Sebastián Velásquez (born 1991), Colombian footballer
- Sergio Velasquez (born 1952), American soccer player
- Víctor Velásquez (born 1976), Salvadoran footballer
- Vince Velasquez (born 1992), Major League Baseball pitcher
- Wilfred Velásquez (born 1985), Guatemalan footballer
- Wilmer Velásquez, Honduran football player

== Other ==
- Andrew Velasquez (born 1969), American civil servant
- Baldemar Velasquez (born 1947), president of the Farm Labor Organizing Committee, AFL–CIO
- Chico Velasquez (died 1854), Native American leader
- Diego Velázquez de Cuéllar, Spanish conquistador leader of the conquest of Cuba
- Edmund Velasquez (died 2002), Belizean drowning victim
- Fidel Velázquez Sánchez, 20th-century Mexican union leader
- Héctor Velázquez (physician) (1864-1945), Paraguayan ophthalmologist and foreign minister
- José Velásquez (explorer) (1717–1785), Spanish explorer
- José Velásquez Bórquez (1833–1897), Chilean general
- Juan Velázquez Tlacotzin, puppet ruler of the Aztec Empire (1525–26)
- Lizzie Velásquez (born 1989), author and motivational speaker, she is the index case for Marfanoid–progeroid–lipodystrophy syndrome
- Loreta Janeta Velázquez (1842–1923), writer and alleged soldier
- María Sofía Velásquez (born 1989), Panamanian beauty pageant winner
- Pablo Medina Velázquez (c. 1961–2014), Paraguayan journalist
- Richard Velazquez (born 1973), Tech Executive, Community Leader, First Puerto Rican designer for Porsche AG in Germany
- René Velázquez Valenzuela (died 2016), Mexican suspected hitman
- Ronny Velásquez (born 1951), Venezuelan anthropologist
- Sonia Velásquez (born 1977), Colombian journalist

== See also ==
- Velázquez, Uruguay, town in Uruguay
- Velázquez Press, American publishing company
- Velázquez (Madrid Metro), a station on Line 4
