= El Pueblo =

El Pueblo may refer to:

== Places ==
- El Pueblo (Pueblo, Colorado), listed on the NRHP in Pueblo County, Colorado
- El Pueblo, Wichita, Kansas
- Barrios of Puerto Rico, 75 barrio-pueblos, municipality seats in Puerto Rico

== Newspapers ==
- El Pueblo (Spanish newspaper)
- El Pueblo (Nicaraguan newspaper)

== Other uses ==
- El Pueblo de Los Ángeles Historical Monument in California
- El Pueblo History Museum in Colorado
