= Alexander Barclay (disambiguation) =

Alexander Barclay (c. 1476–1552) was an English/Scottish poet.

Alexander Barclay may also refer to:

- Alexander Barclay (apothecary) (died before 1608) Scottish herbalist
- Alexander Barclay (frontiersman) (1810–1855), British trader in the American West and partner of Teresita Sandoval
- Alexander Charles Barclay (1823–1893), English brewer and Liberal politician
- Alexander Barclay (politician), member of the House of Assembly of Jamaica

== See also ==
- Alex Barclay (born 1974), Irish crime writer
- Xander Berkeley (born 1955), American actor
