= Fort Le Duc =

- Trading post and fort
- Nicknames: Buzzard's Roost, El Cuervo, Maurice's Fort, and Crow's Nest
- Approximate location of Fort Le Duc
- Coordinates: 38.278°N 105.101°W
- Country: United States
- State: Colorado
- County: Custer
- Nearest town: Between Florence and Wetmore, Colorado

Fort Le Duc or Fort LeDuc (Note: It was also called Buzzard's Roost, El Cuervo, Maurice's Fort, and Crow's Nest.) was a fort and trading post built between present-day Florence and Wetmore, Colorado. It was named after trapper Maurice LeDuc or Maurice LeDoux, and constructed around 1830 or 1835.

== Geography ==
The fort was located in the Hardscrabble valley between present-day Florence and Wetmore, Colorado on a bluff above Mineral Creek and Adobe Creek. It was off of the Hardscrabble Trail, an old Native American trail at the foot of Greenhorn Mountain. The trail went through the Wet Mountain Valley and Sangre de Cristo Mountains, (Note: A source states that the fort was 5 miles from Bent's Old Fort, but per Google Maps, the two forts were about 105 miles apart. Brooks says that Fort Leche was established 5 miles from Bent's Fort. He also says that Fort Le Duc and Bent's Fort were 90 miles apart.) through the San Luis Valley and down to Taos and Santa Fe where fur skins were traded for goods. They traveled there along Indian trails and the Santa Fe Trail. Trapper's Trail was another route used by trappers and traders in Colorado.

== Maurice Le Duc ==
Maurice Le Duc, a French Canadian, grew up in La Crosse, Kingdom of France. (Note: His surname was spelled a number of ways and he was also confused with his father, also a mountain man, which makes it hard to track records of Le Duc's life events.) He left the area as a boy, perhaps with his father, who was a trapper also named Maurie Le Duc. The younger Le Duc partnered up with Thomas "Pegleg" Smith and trapped in the far west of the American frontier by the age of seventeen. He spent time in Taos. Le Duc married a Ute woman.

== History ==
Le Duc is believed that he may have obtained money to start the fort and trading post from the Bent brothers, Charles and George Bent. LeDuc had several circumstances that helped him succeed at the site. The Mexican government licensed him to trade, he was able to purchase the moonshine Taos Lightning, and his wife had many Native American friends who traded at the post. Utes passed through the area as they traveled between the hunting grounds of the plains and west through the Wet Mountain Valley. LeDuc established the post with William LeBlanc and other trappers. He cultivated crops, trapped for furs, and operating the trading post.

External image
- Layout and sketch of Fort Le Duc, also called Fort Maurice LeDoux

The fort was 144 feet (44 m) wide, made of picket lots, and had bastions at the corners. There were wooden gates on the west side of the building that led to a 48-square foot central plaza. An adobe house within the enclosure provided living quarters. The fort, with eight rooms, protected settlers from often hostile Native Americans. It was in service until 1848 or 1854, when settlements such as Hardscrabble were established in the area. There are no remains of the fort today.

A historical marker was installed in 1969 in recognition of Fort Le Duc by the Arkansas Valley Chapter of the Daughters of the American Revolution, Colorado Department of Highways, and Colorado Historical Society. It is located seven miles south of Florence. The historical marker is entitled "Hardscrabble".

== See also ==
- Early history of Fremont County, Colorado
- List of forts in Colorado
