= Hardscrabble, Colorado =

Hardscrabble
- Settlement or village
- Approximate location of Hardscrabble Hardscrabble (the United States)
- Coordinates: 38.325°N 105.077°W
- Country: United States
- State: Colorado
- County: Fremont
- Nearest town: Wetmore
- Elevation: 5,400 ft (1,600 m)

Hardscrabble was a settlement established by traders and trappers in the 1840s near the fork of Adobe and Hardscrabble Creeks in present-day Fremont County, Colorado. It was called San Buenaventura de los Tres Arrollos—for three creeks Newlin, Adobe, and Hardscrabble—by its founders, George Simpson, Joseph Doyle, and Alexander Barclay. The name Hardscrabble became more common.

It was built on the former site of a Bent brothers trading post and near the Fort Le Duc trading post. Houses were built together to form a square, as a protection from attack by Arapaho and Ute people. Teresita Sandoval lived at Hardscrabble beginning in 1844. After Lawrence Lupton left his Fort Lupton trading post in 1845, he came to Hardscrabble to farm and run the trading post in 1848. He and his family left for California in 1849.

Indeed, the men who have located here are all those whom the wreck of the mountain trade and hunting parties have left on the surface, unfitted to return to former haunts or avocations, with minds alienated by new convictions from home and early friends, and habits transformed by constant excitement and daring adventure from the dull plodding of the sober citizen to the reckless activity and thrilling interest of a border life, open to the aggression of the savage and the pursuit of free will, free trade, and free thinking.

— Alexander Barclay in a letter about life in Hardscrabble

Hardscrabble was visited in November 1848 by John C. Frémont. At that time, many inhabitants had moved away as it was too far from the Santa Fe Trail to garner much trade business. The Hardscrabble marker, installed by the Arkansas Valley Chapter of the Daughters of the American Revolution, is located near the site of the extinct settlement.
