= Hardscrabble Mountain =

Mountain in Colorado, United States

- Location within Colorado

Highest point
- Elevation: 3,171 m (10,404 ft)
- Coordinates: 38°11′52″N 105°11′42″W

Geography
- Location: Custer County, Colorado, United States
- Parent range: Sangre de Cristo Range

Hardscrabble Mountain is a summit located in Custer County, Colorado with an elevation of 3,171 meters (10,404 ft). It is a peak in the Wet Mountains, a sub-range of the Sangre de Cristo Range of the Rocky Mountains. A local legend is that the mountain was named after an event from Christmas Day 1855. Ute Native Americans attacked settlers in Pueblo, after which soldiers pursued the Utes. They ran up the creek and had a “hard scrabble” to avoid being captured.

Four Hardscrabble Creek streams are found in the Hardscrabble Mountain and Wetmore area:

- North Hardscrabble Creek
- Middle Hardscrabble Creek
- South Fork North Hardscrabble Creek
- South Hardscrabble Creek start at Hardscrabble Mountain.

Other nearby geological sites are:

- South Hardscrabble Park, a flat south of Hardscrabble Mountain
- Hardscrabble Pass, west-southwest of the mountain

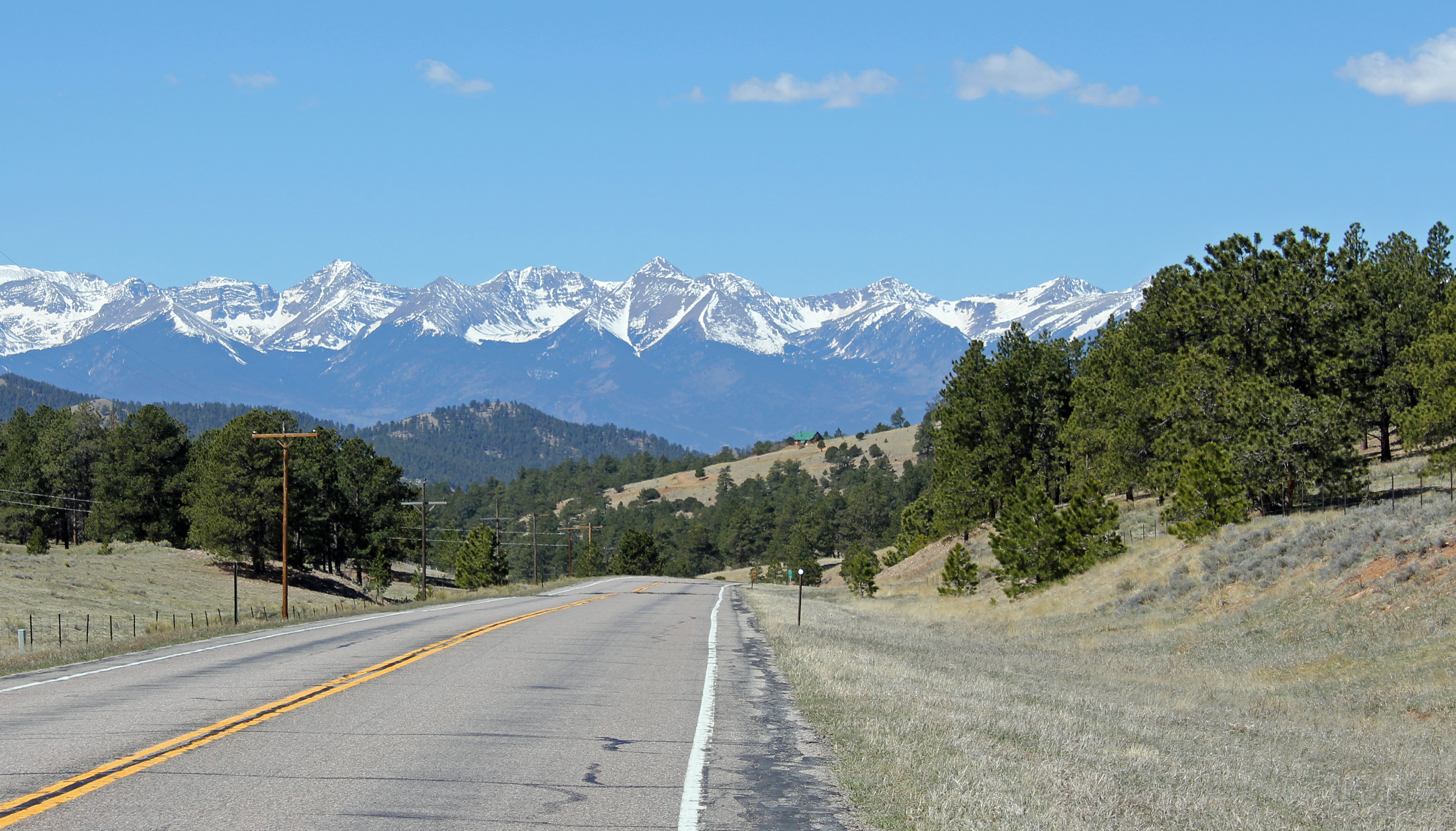
Looking west (towards the Sangre de Cristo Mountains) from Hardscrabble Pass
