= Fort Pueblo Massacre =

1854 incident near Pueblo, Colorado

The Fort Pueblo massacre (also known as The Tragedy at Fort Pueblo or The El Pueblo 1854 Christmas Tragedy) was an attack that occurred on December 25, 1854, against Fort Pueblo, Colorado, also known as El Pueblo, a settlement on the north side of the Arkansas River, 1/2 mile west of the mouth of Fountain Creek, (Note: The exact location of Fort Pueblo is uncertain, since the Arkansas River has moved 1/2 mile south from where it used to be, but it could be near First Street and Santa Fe Avenue in Pueblo City. A historical marker for Fort Pueblo is near 1st Street and South Union in Pueblo (38°16′05″N 104°36′37″W).) above the mouth of the Huerfano. The attack followed the deaths of Chief Chico Velasquez and others who died of smallpox after having been given blanket coats which the Muache believed had been deliberately contaminated. Coalition forces of over 100 Muache Utes and Jicarilla Dindes (mostly Muache Utes) under the leadership of Chief Tierra Blanco (Spanish for "White Earth") led the attack against Fort Pueblo, killing 15 men (mostly native Mexicans, and one Canadian), and capturing one woman, and two boys. Later on, the Muache killed the woman (Chepita Miera) south of Pueblo along Salt Creek. Two women and one man survived the joint military operation, and the two boys who were captured eventually returned.

== Background ==
The Anglo-American builders left Fort Pueblo in 1849. In 1854, Fort Pueblo was inhabited exclusively by native Mexicans from Taos, New Mexico, and their families, and one native American woman.

On 25 February 1854, from the Legislative Council of New Mexico, William S. Messervy sent a memo to the US Congress headed "Jicarilla Indians". This complained that the Jicarillas moved from place to place among the settlements, continually committing depredations on the inhabitants, who could get no redress unless they took the law into their own hands. It asked for the Jicarillas to be "settled in a small extent of country" and "induced to settle in a pueblo and cultivate the soil and support themselves".

In April 1854, soon after the Battle of Cieneguilla in the Jicarilla War, Messervy was acting Governor of the New Mexico Territory and also superintendent of Indian affairs. On April 29, 1854, he wrote to Commissioner of Indian Affairs George Washington Manypenny

"But as they have commenced this war I am determined unless otherwise instructed from your department to listen to no terms of peace from them… the best interest of this territory and the highest dictates of humanity demand their extinction or their settlement in pueblos."

David Meriwether, the Governor of New Mexico, and Kit Carson passed out woolen coats to the Muache Utahs at a major meeting at Abiquiú, New Mexico on the Rio Chama in October 1854. Several Muache chiefs who had accepted the blanket coats caught smallpox and died, including Chico Velasquez. Many Muache believed that these gifts had been deliberately infected. The Muache joined the Jicarilla Dindes in an attack on Costilla. In spite of their differing linguistics, the Jicarilla Dindes and the Muache Utes fought side-by-side because they were historical allies, and because they were closely related by intermarriage.

Benito Sandoval, brother to Teresita and Juana Maria Sandoval, was the Comandante of Fort Pueblo in December 1854.

== Attack ==
Tierra Blanco casually walked into Fort Pueblo on December 25, 1854, went right up to Benito Sandoval, as he did many times before, and talked to him. Benito had traded vegetables and goat's milk with the Muache and Dindes before. Benito Sandoval and Tierra Blanco were friends, and Tierra needed Benito to keep thinking that. Tierra Blanco had challenged Benito Sandoval to a friendly shooting contest. Benito agreed, and as they were shooting at their targets outside of the fort, a crowd of Muaches begin to swell up around them. After the shooting contest had commenced, Benito Sandoval invited Chief Tierra Blanco and his Muaches and Jicarillas back inside the Fort to feast. As they were drinking and feasting, Tierra Blanco gave his signal, and Blanco's soldiers began to massacre the Mexicans.

Blanco's warriors killed 15 Mexican men, including Benito Sandoval, Benito Baca, Manuel Trujeque, Miera, and Nasario. The Canadian was killed a hundred yards away. The Muaches captured Chepita Miera, a married Mexican woman, but they killed her soon afterward, at the Arroyo Salado ("Salt Creek" in English), just south of Pueblo.

Benito's two sons, Felix and Juan Isidro Sandoval, were also captured by the Muache.

Only three people escaped Tierra Blanco's ambush. Andrea, a Mexican wife, and Rosa, a native American, hid in the brush in the river bottoms. Rumaldo lost his tongue after being shot through the mouth, but was able to get away.

== Aftermath ==
As early as February 1855, a U.S. military expedition was organized against the Utes. The companies (sometimes groups volunteers led by Lieutenant Colonel Ceran St. Vrain and Kit Carson) engaged in pitched battles, but also in surprise attacks. One of the most violent attacks came in April 1855, when the U.S. troops organized a surprise night attack on the Utes: "Forty were killed, many wounded, six children were taken prisoner, and all their property was captured."

Fort Pueblo was abandoned afterwards, until it became important again during the Colorado Gold Rush of 1859.

Rumaldo conversed using native American sign-language, which he was already familiar with, for the rest of his days.

Felix Sandoval was given up by the Muaches in Taos, New Mexico to the Americans in 1855 after a peace treaty was signed. The treaty was signed in September 1855, in Abiquiu, NM.

Juan Isidro Sandoval was traded to the Navajo, and then bought by a Mexican speculator. Juan was restored to his mother two years after the Fort Pueblo Massacre after she paid the Mexican speculator $300 in cash and merchandise, including a Hawkins rifle.
