= Hardscrabble Creek (Arkansas River) =

Hardscrabble Creek Rio Peñasco Amarillo
- Location within Colorado

Physical characteristics
- Source
  - location: Custer County, Colorado
  - coordinates: 38.187°N 105.104°W
- Mouth: Arkansas River
  - location: Florence, Fremont County, Colorado

Basin features
- River system: Arkansas River

Hardscrabble Creek is a tributary of the Arkansas River that flows from Custer County, Colorado near Wetmore to its mouth in Fremont County, Colorado, near Florence. It was previously called Rio Peñasco Amarillo.

Four Hardscrabble Creek streams are found in the Hardscrabble Mountain and Wetmore area:

- North Hardscrabble Creek
- Middle Hardscrabble Creek
- South Fork North Hardscrabble Creek
- South Hardscrabble Creek start at Hardscrabble Mountain.

== See also ==
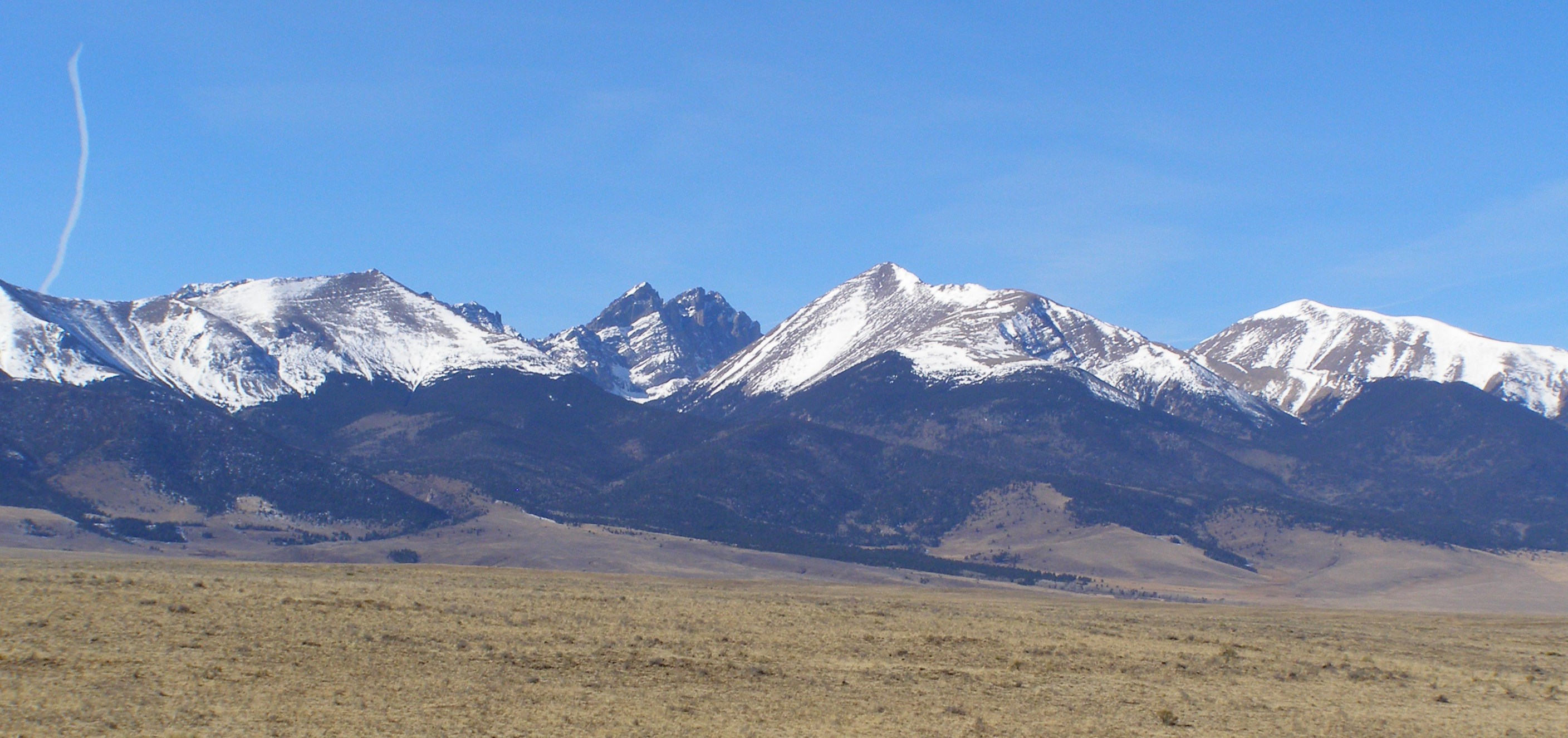
Eastern Sangre de Cristo Mountains. Taken from the Custer and Huerfano county line along Colorado State Highway 69, from left to right: Marble Mountain, Crestone Peak, Humboldt Peak, and Colony Baldy. Hardscrabble Creek flows from Crestone Peak.

- Fort Le Duc
- Hardscrabble Mountain
- List of highest counties in the United States
- List of highest U.S. county high points
