= Saint Charles Reservoir =

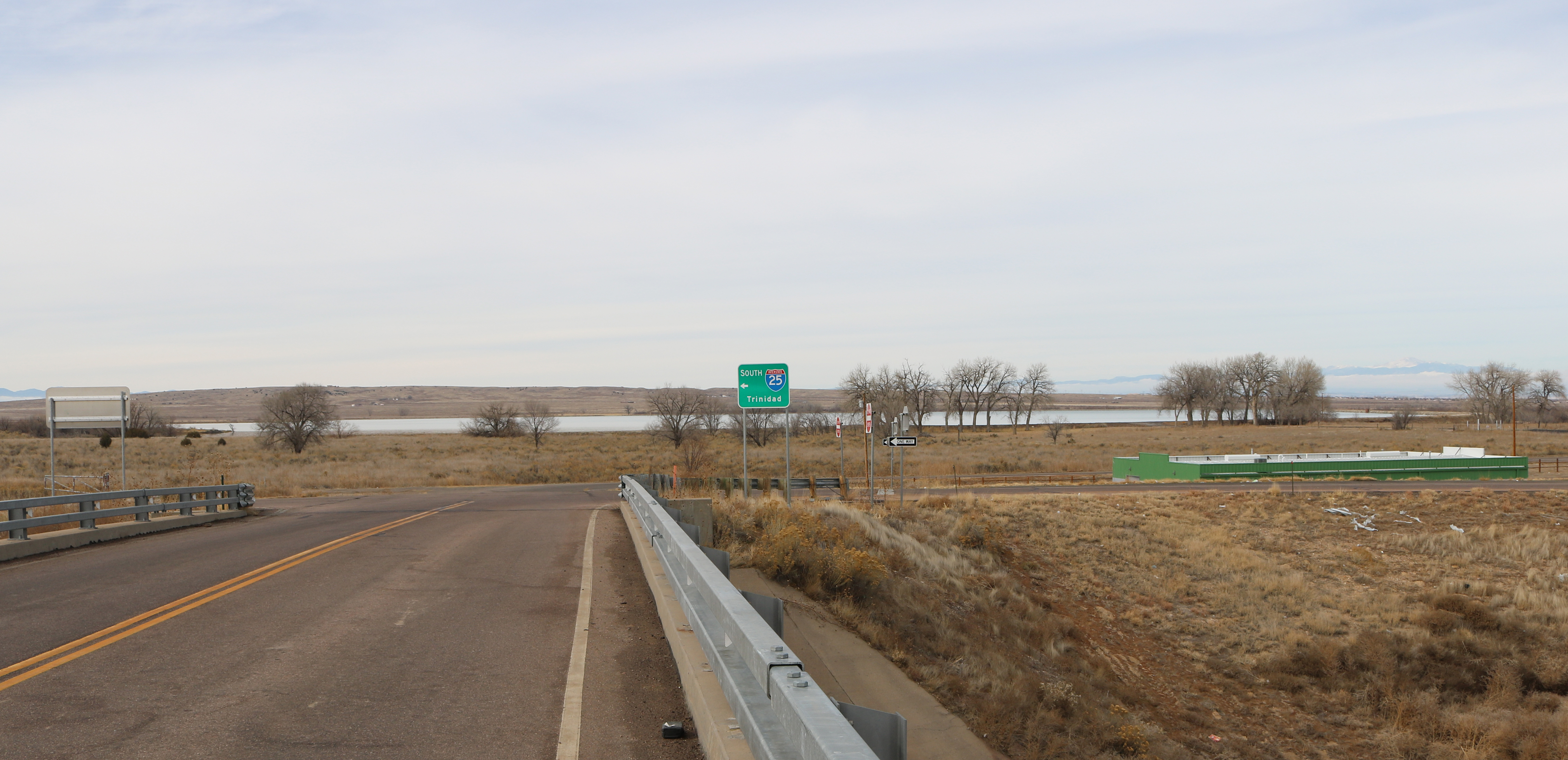
- Saint Charles Reservoir No. 3, viewed from the Stem Beach overpass.

- Location within Colorado
- Location: Pueblo County, Colorado, United States
- Coordinates: 38.171°N 104.649°W
- Type: Reservoir

Saint Charles Reservoir is the name of three reservoirs in Pueblo County, Colorado. The first one, called just Saint Charles Reservoir, is located in the mountains of southwestern Pueblo County, southwest of Beulah, at an elevation of 8,894 feet (2,711 meters). It is located at 38°00′00″N 105°02′35″W.

Saint Charles Reservoir Number 2 and Saint Charles Reservoir Number 3 are located next to each other in Stem Beach, just south of Pueblo. Reservoirs number 2 and 3 were built by Colorado Fuel and Iron in the early 1900s. They impound Salt Creek. All three reservoirs are privately held and not open to the public.
