= Alexander Barclay (frontiersman) =

American frontiersman

Alexander Barclay (May 21, 1810 – December 1855) was an American frontiersman. After working in St. Louis as a bookkeeper and clerk, he worked at Bent's Old Fort. He then ventured westward where he was a trapper, hunter, and trader. Barclay entered into a common-law relationship with Teresita Sandoval, one of the founders of the settlement and trading post El Pueblo. He helped settle Hardscrabble, Colorado and built Fort Barclay in New Mexico.

== Early life ==
Born May 21, 1810, Barclay was raised by his mother, since his father was proven improvident. He had a brother George and sister Mary, with whom he would correspond throughout his life. He was said to have been raised in "genteel poverty".

Barclay worked in London, England as a corset maker as a young adult. He sold his business for 80 pounds and sought off for a new life by sailing for Canada in 1833, having been inspired by the actions of two friends. Arriving ill from his trip, he was quarantined in Quebec for a time and then traveled to Toronto, and then settled north of Lake Huron. He built a simple windowless log lodge, lived there with friends, and farmed the 120 acres he had obtained. After his cabin burned down with all of his possessions, he moved to St. Louis, arriving there in 1836. He first worked for one of his English friends as a bookkeeper. Barclay then got a job on a Mississippi River-cruising steamboat as a clerk.

== Frontier life ==
=== Bent's Fort ===
I had conceived a liaison for the prettiest girl among the Cheyenne tribe, and would have bought her at any price, but her father’s cupidity overreached itself, having a competition for the girl in the tribe who he represented as willing to give eight horses for her, and stated the preference he gave the young Indian, I offered more than on calm reflection I can own without a blush. He gave the finishing touch by requesting me to add another American horse to the offering. As this exceeded fair trade, the additional horse he wished being worth (200) two hundred dollars, I declined any further conference on the subject telling him in his own tongue 'that all the world did not live for me. I loved his daughter, but he could keep her and I could keep my presents.'

— Alexander Barclay in a letter to his brother, George, while working at Bent's Fort

Interested in exploring the frontiers of the American West, and tired of the mosquitos and humidity, Barclay took employment with the Bent, St. Vrain & Company. After surviving a serious illness he caught during the journey west, he began work in 1838 in present-day Colorado at Bent's Old Fort on the Arkansas River. Barclay was a bookkeeper and superintendent of stores. He lived on a simple diet of game, occasionally bread, and no vegetables. Initially, he had difficulty managing the simple diet, the lack of trees, and the commotion from some of the Native Americans who lived outside the walls of the fort; the Comanche were especially troubling to him.

He grew accustomed to the new landscape, including the views of the Spanish Peaks in the distance, and the experiences of meeting varied people along the Santa Fe Trail. For much of the year, Barclay was in charge of the fort while the Bent brothers were trading at Fort Saint Vrain, Taos, or traveling on the Santa Fe Trail. Barclay was made responsible for a wagon train bound for St. Louis in the summer of 1842. Instead of taking the customary trail, he was to travel north to the South Platte River and put the wagons on rafts, which was unsuccessful due to the low water level. He arrived at St. Louis, but decided to leave the trading company.

=== El Pueblo ===
After he tried raising buffalo calves, he began trapping in 1843-44 for furs along the upper Arkansas River. He also hunted for buffalo, moving north and westward. He had difficulty both in finding sufficient animals to obtain furs, and did not make much money when he tried to sell what he did get in St. Louis, due to a drop in demand. In 1844, he moved to the El Pueblo trading post to work as a trader. He met up with former friends, Dick Wooten, Joseph B. Doyle, George S. Simpson, and Mathew Kinkead. His trading business included travel through the mountains and plains of Colorado, Wyoming, and New Mexico and to St. Louis. For instance, in 1846 Barclay traveled in a circuit to Ute camps in the Upper Arkansas River valley, San Luis Valley, and Wet Mountains. This became one method of trading, aside from operating trading posts and attending annual Rocky Mountain Rendezvous, after fur trading shifted from beaver pelts to buffalo skins. In addition to furs, Barclay also received livestock and castoreum glands in trade.

=== Hardscrabble ===
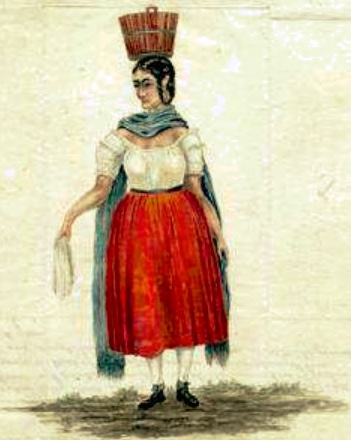
Alexander Barclay, Teresita Sandoval, 1853. Photo Courtesy of Colorado Historical Society

Around 1843, Barclay met Teresita Sandoval, one of the founders of El Pueblo and the common-law wife of Mathew Kinkead. She was also the mother-in-law of George Simpson and Joseph Doyle. In 1844, Barclay moved with the 33-year-old grandmother and her children to Hardscrabble, where Barclay and Sandoval's son-in-laws built the settlement. Sandoval helped establish the settlement at Hardscrabble and Greenhorn. Kinkead had moved to California with their son, Juan.

At Hardscrabble, Barclay and Sandoval operated a store, raised horses and cows, and grew crops. Native Americans and wolves depleted their stock, and they had difficulty with most of their crops. In January 1846, he recorded in his journal that the "Arapahoes threatened to rub me out", during a trip to Fort Laramie. In June of that year, after much of his crop was killed by a heavy frost, he learned of the onset of the Mexican–American War, which might bring Mexican soldiers to the Hardscrabble area. Barclay was made alcalde of the upper Arkansas area in 1846 after the Americans conquest of New Mexico.

Even though Hardscrabble was located within the Mexican Republic, Barclay continued to travel after the war began in May 1847 to El Pueblo to trade, dance, and socialize. He and Sandoval also hosted others from the Arkansas Valley, including friends from Bent's Fort. Making use of his skills as a corset-maker, Barclay had been making hand-sewn garments out of buckskin. He hunted for large game in the area, and he imported cats to take care of the rats in the corn crib. His trading business saw a boost in the arrival of troops to fight in the war; they bought corn and mules. In August, about 500 Mormons set up a temporary settlement near Pueblo, thereby increasing his business activity. He then lived in Pueblo for about a year, trading at the fort. After several skirmishes in the area with Native Americans, Barclay sold his property in Pueblo. Over the years, he traded at Fort Saint Vrain (near present-day Denver) and in Taos, traveling via the Trapper's Trail (versus traveling along the native's superhighway, Huerfano River trail).

=== Fort Barclay ===
Barclay reportedly moved to New Mexico to build a permanent house for Sandoval. He left Hardscrabble with their belongs, children, and animals for an area near Mora and La Junta Canyon in April 1848. They built adobe houses and began planting crops, including wheat, corn, and "California pumpkins". They were near sources of supplies and being along the Santa Fe Trail, they could employee travelers as hired hands. That year, Barclay and Doyle built Fort Barclay at the confluence of Mora and Sapello Rivers (east of present-day Holman, New Mexico). It was 64-foot square, with two stories, two circular bastions, and a courtyard with a well. It had a block of buildings, adobe and log houses, corrals, a blacksmith, and dams. Travelers of the Santa Fe Trail lodged at his fort. His trading post sold a wide range of goods, including whiskey, his homemade wine, and livestock. It was a strong fortress, but it was also damp. He tried to sell it to the U.S. Army, but they refused and built Fort Union.

Barclay was described as broken when the fort was not sold to the Army. Soon after, Joseph Doyle left on October 10, 1853, with a number of families, including Sandoval, her son Tomas, and other family members. It is also stated that Sandoval stayed with him until his death. Barclay died in December 1855 at the fort. He was 45 years of age. He was "a very quiet, cool and considerate gentleman", known for his intellect and dignity. His papers, sketches, and correspondence are in the Bancroft Library collection in Berkeley, California.
