= Teresita Sandoval =

Co-founder of El Pueblo (1811-1894)

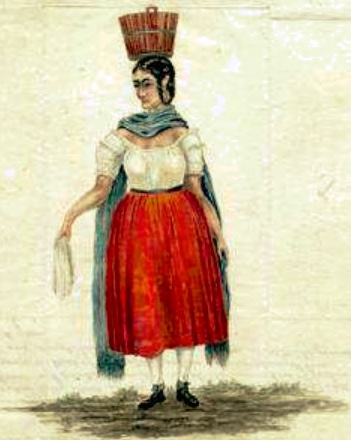
Teresita Sandoval as sketched by Alexander Barclay in 1853. Photo Courtesy of Colorado Historical Society

Maria Teresa "Teresita" Sandoval Suazo (1811–1894) was among the first women of European heritage to live in the Arkansas Valley of present-day Colorado. She is one of the founders of El Pueblo in the current city of Pueblo, Colorado. She managed a ranch, the Doyle Settlement, in her later years.

== Early life and relationships ==
Sandoval was born in 1811 at Taos, New Mexico to Gervasio Sandoval and Ramona Barela. Around 1824 or 1828 Teresita Sandoval married José Manuel Suazo and they had four children, Juana "Juanita" María Suazo (1828-1916), María de la Cruz, José Thomas, and Rufina. The family moved to Mora, New Mexico.

Sandoval met Mathew Kinkead, a Kentucky native, about 1835. They had an affair, thus ending her marriage with Suazo. Sandoval and Kinkead had two children together named Juan Andrés (born November 29, 1835) and Rafaela. Juan Andrés, also called Andrew, was born while Sandoval was still living with her husband. When it was known that the baby was the son of Kinkead, Sandoval moved out of the house and lived with Kinkead. Suazo died in 1844.

In 1838, Kinkead owned three hundred sheep and a yoke of oxen, which he obtained from the sale of his house and land. The sheep grazed in pasture land along the Mora River. There was increased anti-American sentiment due to rumors that soldiers from the Republic of Texas were going to attack New Mexico. Kinkead began to fear both New Mexican people and Texans, who were described as a desperate band of men.

== Pueblo area settlements ==
Teresita Sandoval was one of the daring souls that arrived at the Pueblo settlement in 1841. Like other women of that time, she would witness and be partner to changes in her country. She departed from her traditional life as the wife of Manuel Suazo and followed her heart and Mathew Kinkead to the Arkansas River, where her extended family endeavored to establish life at El Pueblo Trading Post (1842). Described as “pretty as a peach,” Teresita captivated another Englishman, Alexander Barclay, who wrote of “TS” in his journals. From his diary a glimpse of their grand undertakings emerges as does her role and contributions. Her life affirms that women moved between cultures, strengthened family and trade alliances, exercised rights under Mexican Law and ventured north for the freedom the frontier promised.

— Historical marker, near El Pueblo History Museum

In 1841, Kinkead established a farm in Rock Canyon along the Arkansas River, six miles above the mouth of Fountain Creek, at future site of the Goodnight Rock Canon Ranch near the present-day Pueblo Reservoir. He had Dick Wooten trade his sheep for milk cows in Kansas City and deliver them to the farm, where he began to raise buffalo after taking calves from herds. Buffalo calves would suckle on cows and grew to be stronger than oxen. Wooten was probably his employee at the ranch, and Francisco Conn was likely his partner. Sandoval and her daughters were among the first women of European descent in the Arkansas Valley. The others were Louisa Sandoval and Rumalda López Fisher. Sandoval and Kinkead followed buffalo herds on the plains and captured newborn calves. They were in danger of attack from the buffalo and Native Americans. Sandoval was known for her courage. Once they were about a year old, they were sold in Missouri for $100 each. He sold 44 buffalo in the spring of 1842.

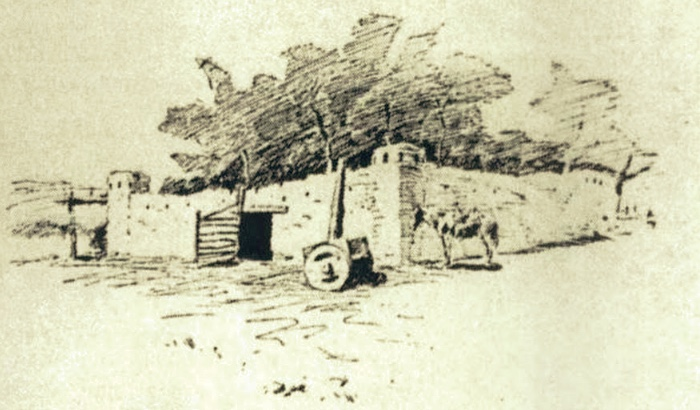
El Pueblo was believed to have looked like the Mexican Ranch by Colonel Henry Inman, published in The Old Santa Fe Trail, 1897

Sandoval and Kinkead were among the founders of El Pueblo trading post, the present Pueblo, Colorado. Sandoval helped build and manage the fort. She played an instrumental role in the daily operations of the post, interacting with Native Americans, trappers, residents, businessmen, and famous American West characters. Goods traded at the fort included buffalo fur and leather, food, jewelry, and tools. The life included hard work and defense against Native Americans who defended their ancestral hunting grounds.

She lived at the trading post with her children and parents. Two of Sandoval's daughters were married at a young age. Juana was married before her 15th birthday to George Simpson by November 1842; Cruz married Joseph Doyle. Both men were residents of El Pueblo.

== Alexander Barclay ==
Later, around 1843, Sandoval met Alexander Barclay, a British trader. In 1844, Sandoval, a 33-year-old grandmother, moved with Barkley to Hardscrabble, where Barclay and Sandoval's son-in-laws built the settlement. Sandoval helped establish the settlement at Hardscrabble and Greenhorn. At Hardscrabble, they operated a store, raised horses and cows, and grew crops. Native Americans and wolves depleted their stock, and they had difficulty with most of their crops. Kinkead had moved to California with their son, Juan.

Barclay reportedly moved to New Mexico to build a permanent house for Sandoval. In 1848, Barclay and Doyle built Fort Barclay in northern New Mexico, which he wanted to sell to the U.S. government.

Prior to 1848, when the Mexican–American War ended, Mexican law allowed women to inherit and purchase land and livestock, to share ownership with their husbands, to establish their own businesses, and to begin divorce proceedings. After 1848, the new United States laws deprived women of these rights.

== Doyle Settlement ==
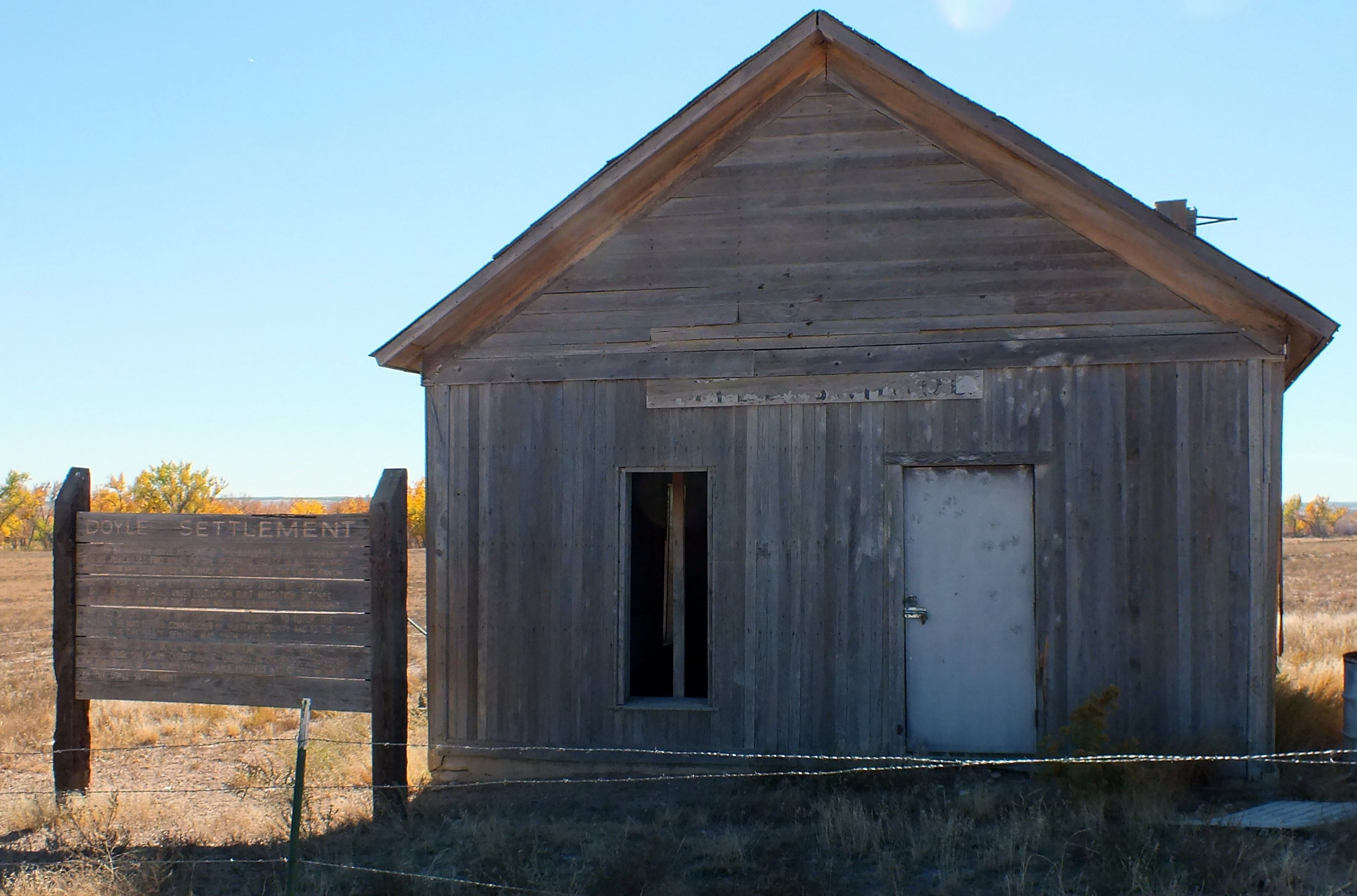
Schoolhouse at Doyle Settlement, southeast of Pueblo on Doyle Road, listed on the National Register of Historic Places

In 1853, or after Barclay's death in 1855, Sandoval lived in a one-room house on the ranch of her daughter, Maria De La Cruz "Cruzita" Suaso Doyle (b. 1831), and son-in-law, Joseph Doyle. Doyle established a 1,200-acre ranch and settlement, called Doyle Settlement, along two miles of the Huerfano River in what is now Pueblo County. The land was from the Vigil and St. Vrain Land Grant. Doyle died unexpectedly in 1864 and left the ranch to his wife. Sandoval managed the ranch from 1864 to the 1890s. Doyle Settlement remained in the family for decades. She died in 1894 and is buried at Plaza Cemetery, Pueblo, Colorado.

== Popular culture ==
- She is portrayed, along with other notable Hispanic people of Pueblo, Colorado, in a mural, Corazon del Pueblo, by David Garcia at the Hispanic Resource Center at the Robert Hoag Rawlings Public Library.
