= Stem Beach, Colorado =

Unincorporated community in Colorado, United States

Coordinates: 38°09′50″N 104°38′37″W

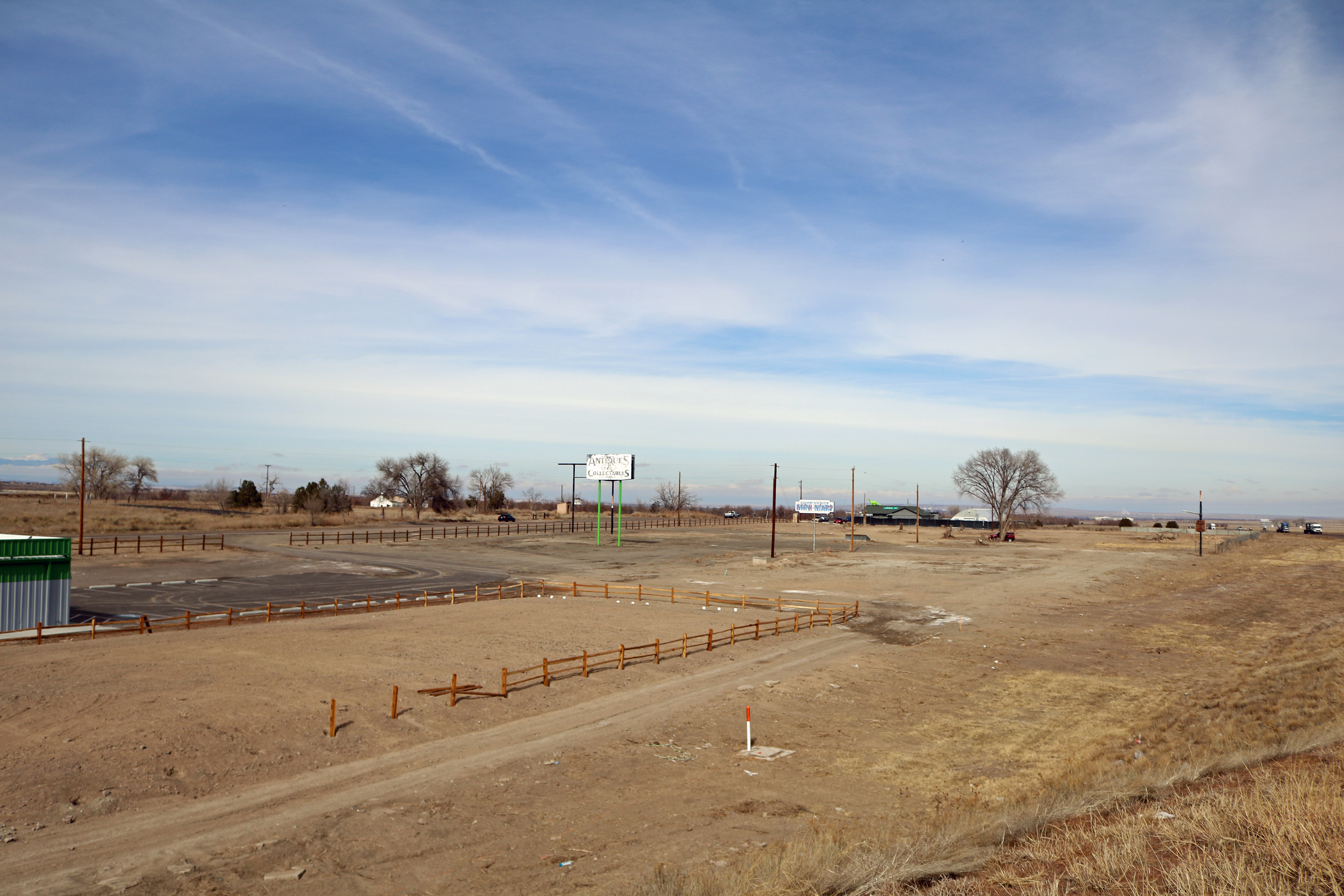
A view of Stem Beach from the top of the southbound Interstate 25 off ramp.

Stem Beach is an unincorporated community Pueblo County, Colorado, south of Pueblo. The community is the location of the Stem Beach exit (exit 91) on both north and southbound Interstate 25. A retail cannabis store is located in Stem Beach, on the west side of the freeway, and the CS Wind manufacturing facility is located east of the interstate on Tower Road.

== Name ==
The name Stem Beach comes from the beaches at two reservoirs (Saint Charles Reservoir Number 2 and Saint Charles Reservoir Number 3) in the community. Reeds with prominent stems grow along the reservoirs' beaches.

== See also ==
- Saint Charles Reservoir
