= El Pueblo History Museum =

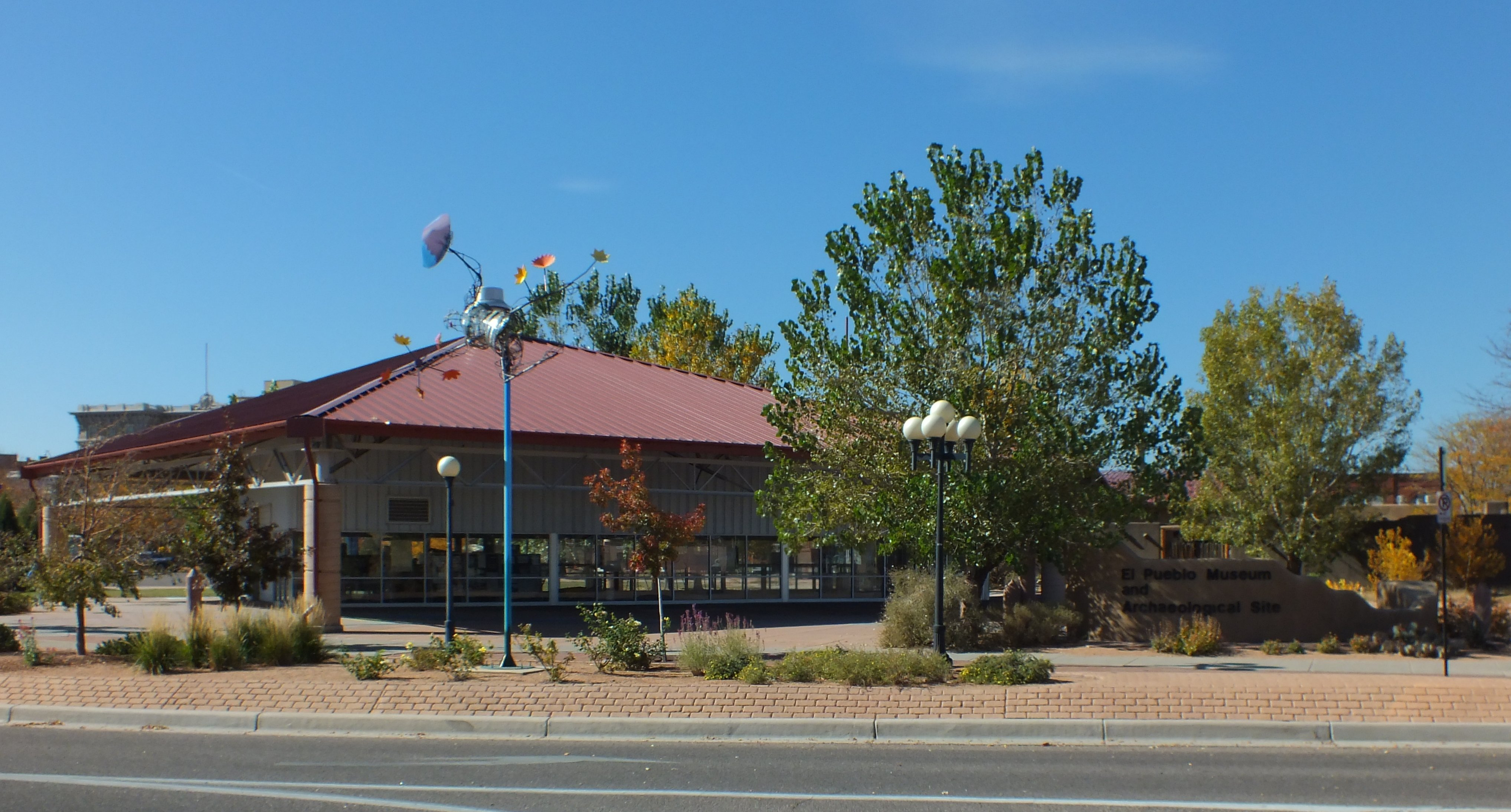
- William G. Buckles Archaeological Pavilion
- Established: 1990
- Location: 301 N Union Ave; Pueblo, Colorado
- Coordinates: 38°16′03″N 104°36′35″W
- Type: Local history museum
- Accreditation: American Alliance of Museums
- Director: Dianne Archuleta
- Parking: On site (no charge); Covered parking available 300-398 W 3rd St Garage
- Website: elpueblohistorymuseum.org
- El Pueblo
- U.S. National Register of Historic Places
- Colorado State Register of Historic Properties
- Location within Colorado
- Location: Corner of City Center Drive & Union Ave., Pueblo, Colorado
- Coordinates: 38°16′03″N 104°36′35″W
- Built: 1842
- NRHP reference No.: 96000039
- CSRHP No.: 5PE.303
- Added to NRHP: February 16, 1996

El Pueblo History Museum is a local history museum in Pueblo, Colorado, United States. The museum presents the history of Pueblo, together with the cultural and ethnic groups of the region. The historical site includes an 1840s-style adobe trading post and plaza and the archaeological excavation site of the original 1842 El Pueblo trading post which was listed on the US National Register of Historic Places in 1996. The facility is administered by History Colorado.

The museum is an affiliate of the Smithsonian Institution, and is accredited by the American Alliance of Museums (AAM).

== History ==
- 1803 The United States makes the Louisiana Purchase and President Thomas Jefferson sends Meriwether Lewis and William Clark on their mission of exploration, mapping, trade, science, and sovereignty.
- 1806 James Wilkinson sends Zebulon Pike to explore the Southwestern United States, they establish an outpost near the confluence of the Fountain Creek and the Arkansas River, before attempting to summit Pikes Peak. In 1807 they build the first structure in the area, Pike's Stockade which was declared a National Historic Landmark in 1961.
- 1842 construction of El Pueblo as an independent trading post.
- 1848 Business at the fort declines as a result of the Mexican–American War. The Treaty of Guadalupe Hidalgo, the peace treaty ending the war alters the trade dynamics of the region and the simultaneous discovery of gold in California causes the forts population to dwindle.
- 1854 Ute and Jicarilla Apache natives led by Chief Tierra Blanco lead a successful attack on the fort, killing 15 men, and capturing one woman, and two boys. The fort was abandoned following the attack.
- 1858 Pike's Peak Gold Rush brings people to the area who will plat Pueblo and Fountain City near the confluence of the Arkansas and Fountain.
- 1860 Pueblo platted taking name from the old trading post. It is replatted in 1870 following its organization. Settlers used some of El Pueblo's adobe bricks to build their own structures and gradually built over the fort, by the 1880s it had disappeared under the new city.
- 1888 Farriss Hotel is built on the site where El Pueblo once stood.
- 1959 The Colorado Historical Society (now History Colorado) open the El Pueblo History Museum, which included a full-scale replica of El Pueblo, at the converted old Pueblo Municipal Airport hangar.
- 1980s The University of Southern Colorado begins program to locate El Pueblo. They settle on a possible location under the Fariss Hotel.
- 1988 Deborah Mora Espinosa is hired as the executive director.
- 1989 USC Anthropology professor William G. Buckles initiates a survey of the Fariss Hotel's basement.
- 1991 The city tears down the Fariss Hotel allowing for more extensive archaeological excavations. Signs of El Pueblo's structure are discovered.
- 1992 El Pueblo History Museum relocates to a building on the same block as the excavation.
- 1996 The rediscovered El Pueblo fort is listed on the National Register of Historic Places.
- 2003 The new El Pueblo Museum complex is completed. It includes the El Pueblo History Museum, the William G. Buckles Archaeology Pavilion over the excavation site and a reconstruction that resembles the original trading post.
- 2014 Director Espinosa retires, and Dawn DiPrince becomes new executive director.
- 2021 Dawn DiPrince leaves role at El Pueblo Museum, and Dianne Archuleta becomes the new executive director.

== Exhibits ==
- Seeing Red (Jan 19, 2019 - Apr 30, 2019) examines the history of redlining in Pueblo.
- Borderlands of Southern Colorado examines the areas border history. A portion of what is now the city of Pueblo was part of the Louisiana Purchase; another section of the city was part of Old Mexico, and later claimed by the Republic of Texas.
- Children of Ludlow examines the Colorado Coalfield War and Ludlow Massacre from the perspective of the children who endured the strike.
- Museum of Memory examines the histories of Pueblo neighborhoods with community members sharing oral histories.
- El Movimiento documenting the Chicano struggle for civil rights in Colorado as part of the Chicano Movement. Originally housed at El Pueblo History Museum, it has been moved to Pueblo Community College.
- The Bell Rings (Sept 8, 2017 - Feb 4, 2018) The exhibit examined The Bell Game, an annual football contest between two Pueblo high schools, Central High School and Centennial High School. They have been playing each other since 1892 in what is believed to be the oldest ongoing American football rivalry west of the Mississippi River.

== Programs ==
When Pueblo School District 60 switched to four-and-a-half school days and then to four days, "Hands on History" was organized by the museum to help working parents give their children a place to go on Friday afternoons after school was out. The program then expanded to a full day on Fridays and also now has a summer program. The successful program has expanded to other Colorado cities as well, including Trinidad, Fort Garland, Platteville and Montrose.

== See also ==
- National Register of Historic Places listings in Pueblo County, Colorado
