= Chico Velasquez =

Leader of the Jicarilla Apache and Ute people

Jicarilla Apache and Ute leader

Chief

Personal details
- Died: 1854

Chico Velasquez (died 1854) was a leader of the Jicarilla Apache and Ute people. He was originally closely associated with the Jicarilla and was blamed for attacks on Americans in the early part of the Jicarilla War. Velasquez met with American leaders in 1850 and promised not to take up arms against Americans and Mexicans. By 1854 he was working with the American governor of New Mexico David Meriwether to recover stolen American livestock. As reward for searching for a fugitive murderer, Velasquez was given an embroidered gray coat, but that coat and blankets given to the Ute at the same time were infected with smallpox. The disease killed Velasquez and many other Ute and was one of the causes of the Fort Pueblo Massacre.

== With the Jicarilla ==
Chico Velasquez is often identified as a Ute but some historians consider him to have been a Jicarilla Apache. He was closely associated with the Jicarilla in the first part of his life and the governor of New Mexico, David Meriwether, who knew Velasquez considered him to be of Jicarilla origin. Taking a Spanish name, as Velasquez did, was also unusual among the Ute.

The Jicarilla War began in New Mexico in 1849 and Velasquez was regarded as a particularly militant Indian chief by the Americans. He was blamed for the 1849 killing of American doctor Benjamin J. Kern (brother of Edward Kern), though this was also blamed on Mexican muleteers. The American army officer Major John Greiner blamed Velasquez for attacks on two settler wagon trains. On two occasions Velasquez's band was tracked by American Major Benjamin Lloyd Beall and his scout Kit Carson, though he was not brought to battle.

Velasquez was reputed to wear a necklace made from the finger bones of his defeated enemies. He met Canadian trader Auguste Lacome near Culebra Peak in 1850, Lacome said that Velasquez's leggings were decorated with the "fingernails on Americans on one side and of Mexicans on the other". Lacome thought that Velasquez had been raiding wagon trains in alliance with the Apaches.

== Ute and Fort Pueblo ==
By 1850 Velasquez had become more associated with the Ute and, with seven of their chiefs, met with American leaders and promised to never again take up arms against American or Mexican citizens. Velasquez met with Meriwether several times in the early 1850s and was promised supplies of food. These never arrived and Velasquez was further aggrieved by the encouragement the American authorities gave to settlers in the San Luis Valley. In 1853 Velasquez's band was implicated in the robbery of a group of Americans. The American Indian agent to the Utes, a Mr Graves, complained to Meriwether and considered war against the Ute was inevitable. Meriwether agreed and thought he would have to kill Velasquez and hunt down his "daring band which has infested our borders for a long time".

Despite this Velasquez afterwards worked for Meriwether to recover stolen horses and cattle. On March 5, 1854, the same day Lobo Blanco was killed leading a band of Jicarilla in battle against US Dragoons, Velasquez returned 200 cattle that had been stolen from Fort Union. It was considered by some contemporaries that Velasquez had abandoned the Jicarilla at the right time to avoid being targeted by the Americans. He afterwards succeeded Blanco as chief of the Jicarilla. By this time the Americans had come to regard the Utes, which Velasquez had led in a policy of "peace, justice and trade", as largely peaceful when compared to the Apache.

Velasquez and Ute leader Tamouche searched for a wanted murderer and turned him over to the Americans. He was rewarded with a gray coat with red and yellow braid, given to him at an October 1854 meeting with the Indian Superintendent at Abiquiú. The coats, and blankets given to other chiefs at the meeting, were infected with smallpox. The disease badly affected the Ute in the San Luis Valley. All of the chiefs who had attended the meeting at Abiquiú, including Velasquez, died from smallpox.

The Abiquiú incident was likely unintentional but the surviving Utes thought they had been targeted and war-minded leaders held sway. The smallpox led to starvation and the Utes turned to cattle raiding; one American trader was killed near Apache Creek. The Utes raided Fort Pueblo on December 25, 1854, massacring its inhabitants. Attacks continued to around a year after the massacre before peace was negotiated. Velasquez's successor as chief of the Ute was Ka-ni-ache, another moderate. It is possible that a Miguel Velasquez recorded on the rolls of the Ute Indian Agency was Velasquez's son.
