= Ronny Velásquez =

Ronny Velásquez (born 31 August 1951) is a Venezuelan anthropologist, scientific explorer and editor.

== Works ==
- 1977 - Titán, Cantor Popular del Zulia
- 1979 - Miskitos, (Honduras 1979)
- 1979 - Guaymi, (Panamá 1979)
- 1987 - Mito, chamanismo y religión en cuatro naciones étnicas de América Aborigen
- 1987 - Bolívar en el culto a María Lionza
- 1989 - Literatura Oral Kuna
- 1989 - Indigenous ideas of the Sacred with special reference to Kuna and Piaroa Simbolism
- 1990 - El folklore, la tradición y la Cultura Popular, categorías flexibles para la Interpretación de la obra del hombre
- 1991 - Cosmovisión Aborigen
- 1992 - Música y danza Precolombina
- 1992 - Las culturas étnicas precolombinas
- 1992 - Los Mayas. La gran civilización
- 1993 - Los Kammu Purwi, Flautas de Pan de los aborígenes Kunas de Panamá
- 1993 - Mitos de Creación de la Cuenca del Orinoco
- 1995 - Mitos y Leyendas. Venezuela para Jóvenes. Literatura, Teatro, Mitos y Leyendas
- 1997 - Cultura y Pueblos Indígenas. Dossier en Venezuela Cultural: Los instrumentos, el canto y la acción chamánica.
- 1997 - Visión Americanista de la Artesanía (Co-Autor)
- 1997 - Shamanismo Sudamericano (Co-Autor)
- 1998 - Indígenas de Venezuela
- 1998 - Canto Chamánico
- 1998 - Música y Danza Precolombina (Ausgewählte Artikel)
- 2000 - 500 Años de Colón en Venezuela y las imágenes Simbólicas del Indio venezolano desde la época de la Conquista
- 2000 - Venezuela Indígena y la Constitución Bolivariana
- 2000 - Espíritus aliados, microbios cosmogónicos y cura chamánica
- 2002 - Aspectos teóricos del pensamiento complejo en el universo musical aborigen
- 2002 - Los Pueblos amerindios y la pérdida del Esequibo, territorio netamente venezolano
- 2004 - Cultura local, identidad Nacional y Pensamiento complejo en la creación intelectual de los pueblos aborígenes de América
- 2004 - Estética Aborigen
- 2004 - Cosmovisión y Etnografía bajo una comprensión holística (Volume 3: La poesía y literatura popular)
- 2005 - La poesía en las culturas indígena y africana y su trascendencia. Comisión de Estudios Interdisciplinarios
