= Salt Creek (Pueblo County, Colorado) =

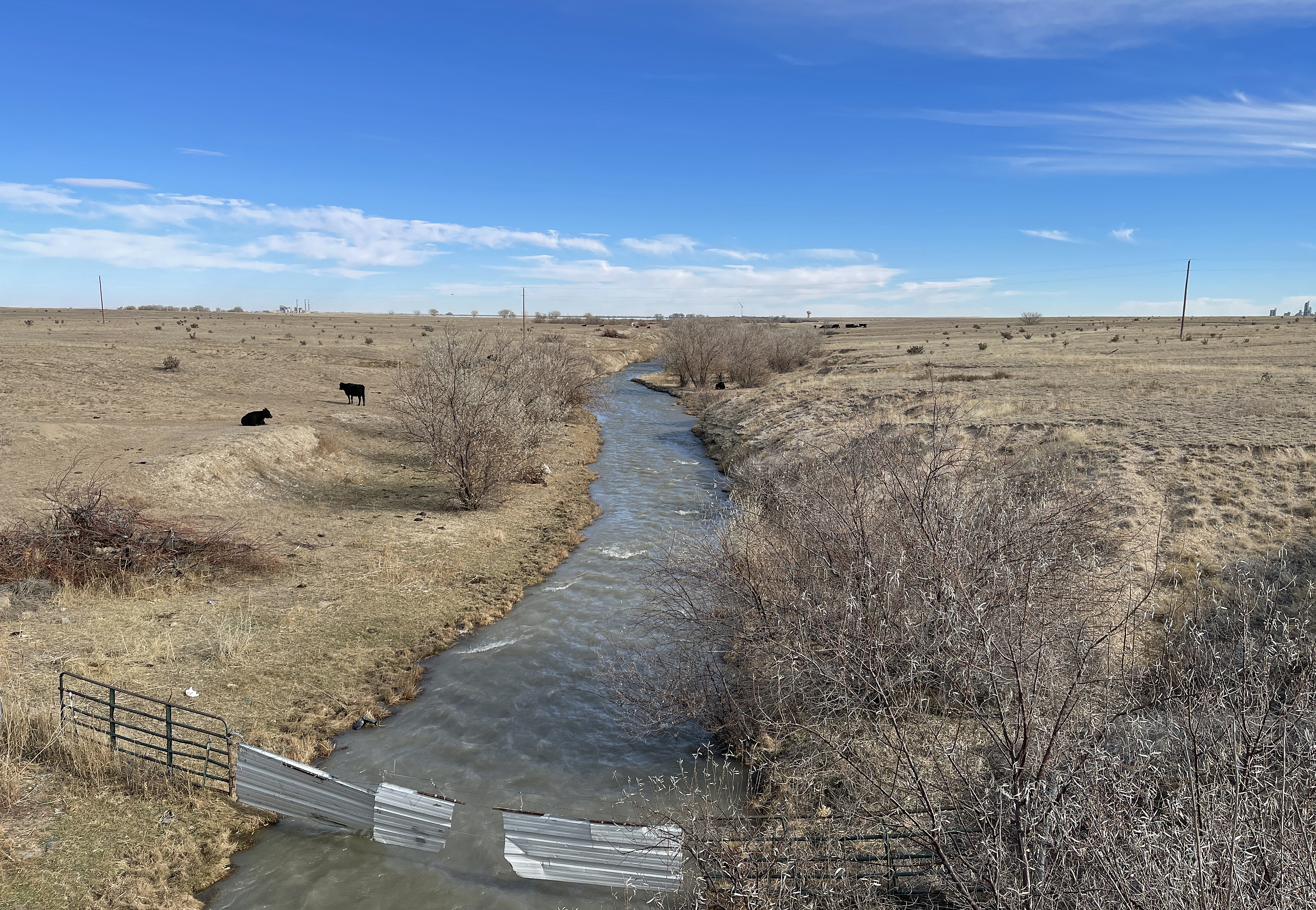
- The creek at Little Burnt Mill Road

Physical characteristics
- Source
  - coordinates: 38°6′26.02″N 104°49′5.94″W
- Mouth
  - location: Arkansas River
  - coordinates: 38°15′7.01″N 104°34′32.90″W
  - elevation: 4,633 feet (1,412 meters)

Basin features
- Progression: Arkansas — Mississippi

Salt Creek is a tributary of the Arkansas River in Pueblo County, Colorado in the United States. Salt Creek, Colorado, an unincorporated community and census-designated place just east of Pueblo, takes its name from the creek.

== Course ==
The creek rises in arid rangeland southwest of Pueblo, Colorado. From there, it flows generally northeastward. At a point 2.3 miles (3.7 kilometers) west of Saint Charles Reservoir Number 3, the Minnequa Canal – which begins at a diversion dam on the Arkansas River 30 miles (48 kilometers) west of Pueblo near Florence, Colorado – empties into the creek, greatly increasing its flow. The creek also receives water from the St. Charles Flood Ditch. Further downstream, the creek is impounded by Saint Charles Reservoir Number 3 and then Saint Charles Reservoir Number 2. Next the creek flows under Interstate 25 and then continues northeast through the Evraz steel mill and other industrial areas, then along the west side of the Salt Creek neighborhood. Finally, the creek goes under Santa Fe Drive in Pueblo and then flows east along and south of the Arkansas River, passing through several ponds and channelized sections before emptying into the Arkansas River itself.

== Pollution ==
The creek receives untreated wastewater from the Evraz steel mill, and the creek's water is not treated until just before it empties into the Arkansas River. Residents upstream, including those in the Salt Creek neighborhood, are asking that exemptions the state of Colorado granted the mill in the 1970s be lifted, so that the mill is required to treat its wastewater before releasing it into the creek.

== See also ==
- List of rivers of Colorado
