= Alexander Barclay (politician) =

Scottish politician, slave trader, author

Alexander Barclay (c. 1784 – 30 October 1864) was a British politician, planter, slave trader and writer who served as a member of the House of Assembly of Jamaica. Born in Aberdeen, he immigrated to the British colony of Jamaica, where he became a member of the planter class. Barclay wrote a proslavery book in 1826 defending the continued existence of slavery in the British West Indies. He once led a slaving voyage of three slave ships to West Africa, overseeing the transportation of hundreds of enslaved Africans back to Jamaica to be sold into slavery.

== Selected publications ==
- A Practical view of the Present State of Slavery in the West Indies. Smith, Elder, London, 1826.
