= El Pueblo (Colorado) =

Archaeological site in Colorado, United States

- Trading post
- Nicknames: Fort Pueblo, Fort Nepesta, Fort Fisher, Fort Juana, Fort Spaulding, Robert Fisher's Fort, Pueblo Almagre
- Site of former El Pueblo, now El Pueblo History Museum
- Coordinates: 38°16′3.58″N 104°36′39″W
- Country: United States
- State: Colorado
- County: Pueblo
- Nearest town: Pueblo

El Pueblo, also called Fort Pueblo or Pueblo San Carlos, was a trading post and fort near the present-day city of Pueblo in Pueblo County, Colorado. It operated from 1842 until 1854, selling goods, livestock, and produce. It was attacked in 1854, killing up to 19 men and capturing three people. A recreation of the fort is located at the El Pueblo History Museum at the site of the original fort.

== History ==
The independent trading post was established in 1842 by traders, trappers, and hunters of Hispanic, French, Anglo, and Native American heritage. The idea began with Bent's Old Fort trader George Simpson. Other likely individuals include Mathew Kinkead, Joseph Mantz, Francisco Conn, Robert Fisher, Joseph Doyle, and Alexander Barclay. Teresita Sandoval played an instrumental role in the daily operations of the post. James Beckwourth claimed to have been an original builder of the fort but efforts to discredit his claims have been suggested as due to racism. John C. Fremont stated of his visit in 1843 that the men were mostly mountain men and the women were from Taos.

It stood just west of the mouth of the Fountain Creek and on the north side of the Arkansas River, which was the border between Mexico and the United States at that time. The Cherokee Trail and Trapper's Trail, also called the Taos Trail, were nearby trading routes.

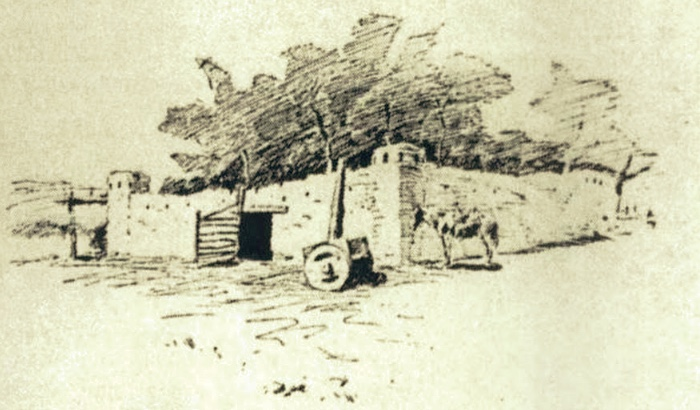
The fort was believed to have looked like the Mexican Ranch by Colonel Henry Inman, published in The Old Santa Fe Trail, 1897

The fort was about 200 x 200 feet, with an entrance on the east side and bastions on the corners. The common, flat room was supported by large wooden beams. Made of adobe, it offered protection against "Indians and thieving whites". It is believed to have been a gated property with a central courtyard. The structure is believed to have had a windowless exterior wall and an internal plaza, with entry to rooms via the plaza. Francis Parkman described it as "nothing more than a large square enclosure, surrounded by a wall of mud, miserably cracked and dilapidated". Up to 100 or 150 people lived at El Pueblo, with several rooms for each trader and their families. The types of rooms included those for trading, living, cooking, storing, and performing blacksmith work.

Goods were traded in the central plaza. People who lived at the post raised crops and livestock, which were traded along with goods. Buffalo hides were bartered, as the demand for beaver fur had dropped. The traders bartered with Native American tribes for hides, skins, livestock, as well as cultivated plants, and liquor. Evidence of this trade, as well as other utilitarian goods, such as Native American pottery shards were found at the recently excavated site. Its customers also included traders from Taos and American trappers. Visitors included James Beckwourth, Richens Lacey Wootton, and Kit Carson.

The business at the post declined with the beginning of the Mexican–American War in 1848. Some of the traders followed the California Gold Rush of 1849. The demand for buffalo fur and robes dropped about 1850. Pressure of new emigrants passing through former Native American lands and failure of the United States to honor treaties created conflict in the area and by 1854, there was a massacre at the post.

== Massacre of 1854 ==
According to accounts of residents who traded at the plaza (including that of George Simpson), the Fort Pueblo Massacre happened sometime between December 23 and December 25, 1854, by a war party of Utes and Jicarilla Apaches under the leadership of Tierra Blanca, a Ute chief. They allegedly killed between fifteen and nineteen men, as well as captured two children and one woman. Much of the building was dismantled during the attack.

== Aftermath ==
The trading post was abandoned after the raid, but it became important again between 1858 and 1859 during the Pike's Peak Gold Rush of 1859. In 1891, portions of the adobe walls were still visible along Union Avenue and the tracks of the Atchison, Topeka and Santa Fe Railway.

The river's courses had changed since the mid-1800s and the exact location was unknown until it was found in 1991 by the University of Southern Colorado during an archaeological excavation. The Farris Hotel had been built over the site, which was found under the site of the hotel during excavation. A smaller recreation of the fort and an archaeological site of the former fort is located at the El Pueblo History Museum. The post site was listed on the National Register of Historic Places in 1996.

== See also ==
- Early history of the Arkansas Valley in Colorado
- List of trading posts in Colorado
- National Register of Historic Places in Pueblo County, Colorado
