= Doyle Settlement =

- U.S. National Register of Historic Places
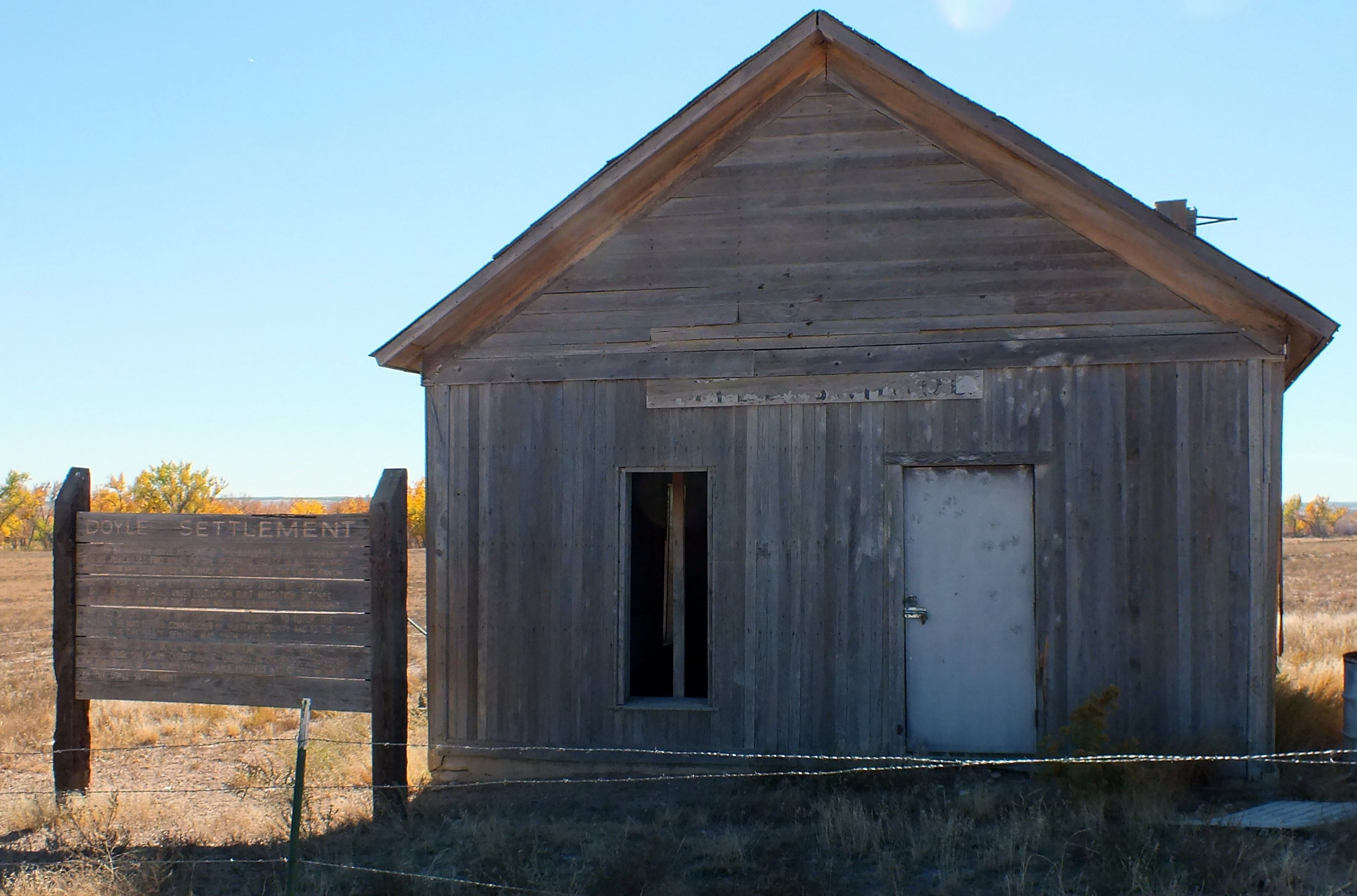
- Doyle Schoolhouse

- Location within Colorado
- Location: Southeast of Pueblo on Doyle Road, Pueblo, Colorado
- Coordinates: 38°3′30″N 104°24′51″W
- NRHP reference No.: 80000922
- Added to NRHP: April 4, 1980

Doyle Settlement was a ranch and settlement in Pueblo, Pueblo County, Colorado. It was listed on the National Register of Historic Places on April 4, 1980.

== Joseph Doyle ==
Joseph Doyle purchased 1,200 acres of land along two miles of the Huerfano River in 1859 and established the Doyle Settlement. The land was from the Vigil and St. Vrain Land Grant. Born in 1817 in what is now West Virginia, Doyle came west as a young man and was a trapper and trader. He was one of the builders of El Pueblo in the current city of Pueblo, Colorado and then was a farmer, businessman, and territorial lawyer. He was the first county commissioner for Huerfano County. He operated a post office from his home, Casa Blanca, having been appointed postmaster. In 1864, he represented Pueblo, Fremont, El Paso, and Huerfano Counties in the State Council of the Territorial legislature. Doyle died in 1864 and left the property to his wife, Maria De La Cruz Suaso, whom he married in 1844. Her mother Teresita Sandoval managed the property. It remained in the family for decades.

== Settlement ==
The Doyle Settlement is "the site of one of the earliest, non-mining communities established in Colorado." Structures began to be built on the site in the late 1850s and are thought to have been built through the early 1860s. The only standing building is the schoolhouse. There is some evidence of the previous buildings, such as a few remaining foundations and ruins.

=== Fort ===
An adobe fort was built by the Huerfano River. At the time of its construction, it was the only residence for many miles. There were probably no more than a couple of dozen people living at the settlement.

=== Residential buildings ===
Doyle's house, Casa Blanca or White House, was built about 1862 and is considered the most important of the settlement's structures. It is a large white frame house, like the kind of house he would have seen from his home state.

There were also two rows of houses with jacal or adobe architecture. Running on a north-south axis, the houses faced each other. The western row were used as granaries and storehouses. The eastern group was used for living and cooking.

=== Cemetery ===
Northwest of Casa Blanca is a cemetery with "some of the finest carved headstones in Colorado" according to the Pueblo Regional Planning Commission for the Preservation Advisory Committee. The headstones represent the mixed heritage of the settlement's residents. Women were primarily of Spanish-Mexican heritage and men were primarily American.

=== School ===
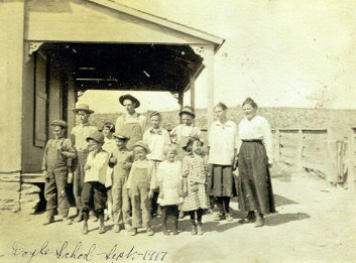
Doyle School of the Doyle Settlement in Pueblo County, Colorado taken in 1917

The school, which still stands, is believed to be the oldest school and the oldest one-room school in Colorado. It was built of adobe, wood siding, and wooden shingles. Doyle brought O.G. Goldrick to teach his children. He was the state's first school teacher. A sign by the schoolhouse provides information about its history.

=== Business ===
On the property was an adobe store, blacksmith shop, and a gristmill. Doyle had installed irrigation ditches and farmed 600 acres of the land.
