= Wetmore, Colorado =

Unincorporated community in Custer County, CO, USA

- Unincorporated community
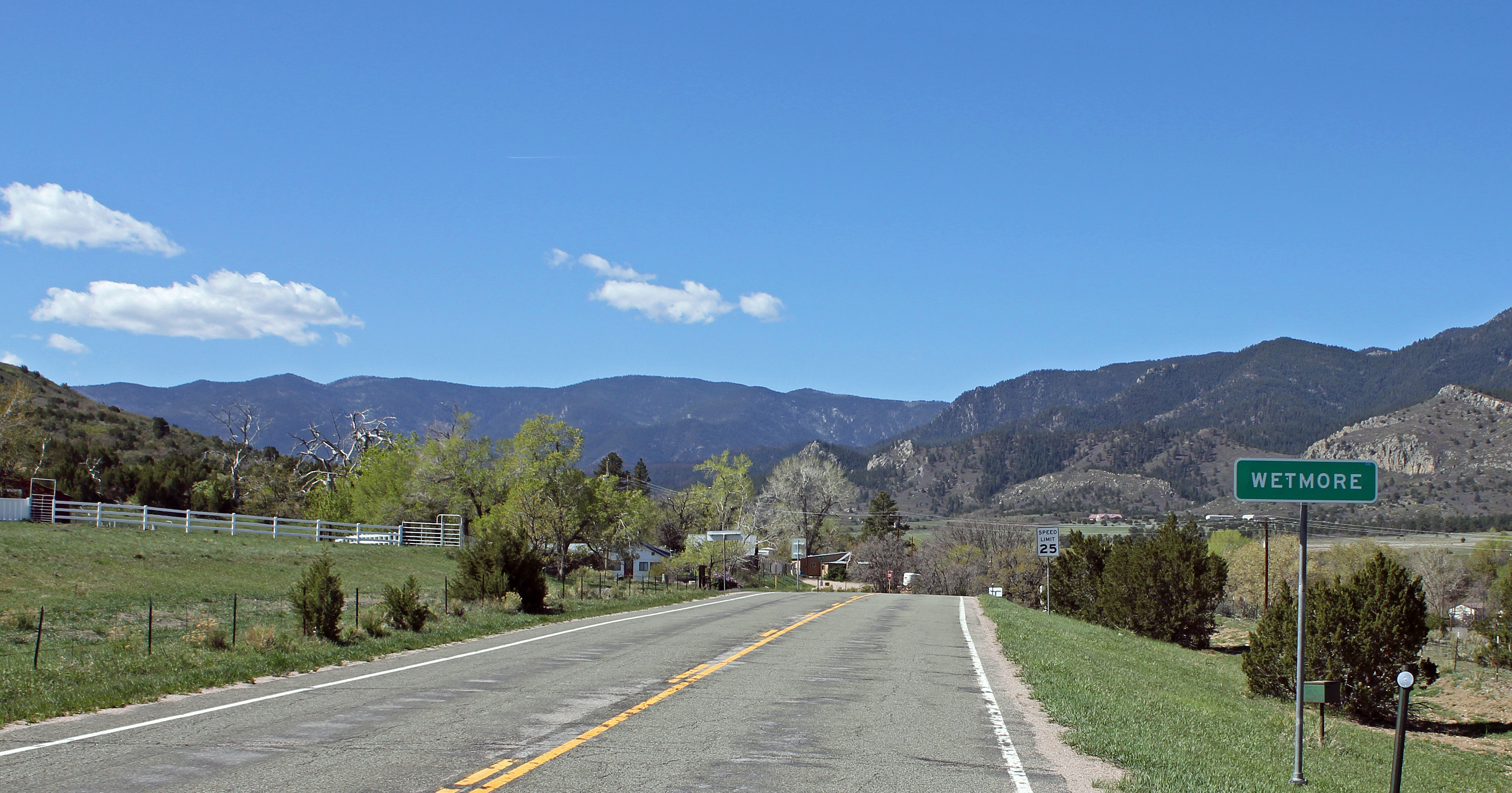
- Entering Wetmore from the east, April 2012

- Location in Custer County and the state of Colorado Wetmore, Colorado (the United States)
- Coordinates: 38°14′17″N 105°05′05″W
- Country: United States
- State: Colorado
- County: Custer County
- Elevation: 6,086 ft (1,855 m)
- Time zone: UTC-7 (MST)
  - Summer (DST): UTC-6 (MDT)
- ZIP code: 81253
- GNIS feature ID: 192225

Wetmore is an unincorporated community and a U.S. Post Office located in Custer County, Colorado, United States.

== Description ==
The Wetmore post office has been in operation since 1881. The community lies at the base of the Wet Mountains along State Highway 96 and was named after William Wetmore, a first settler. It has the ZIP Code 81253.
