= Mineral County, Colorado =

County in the U.S. State of Colorado

- County
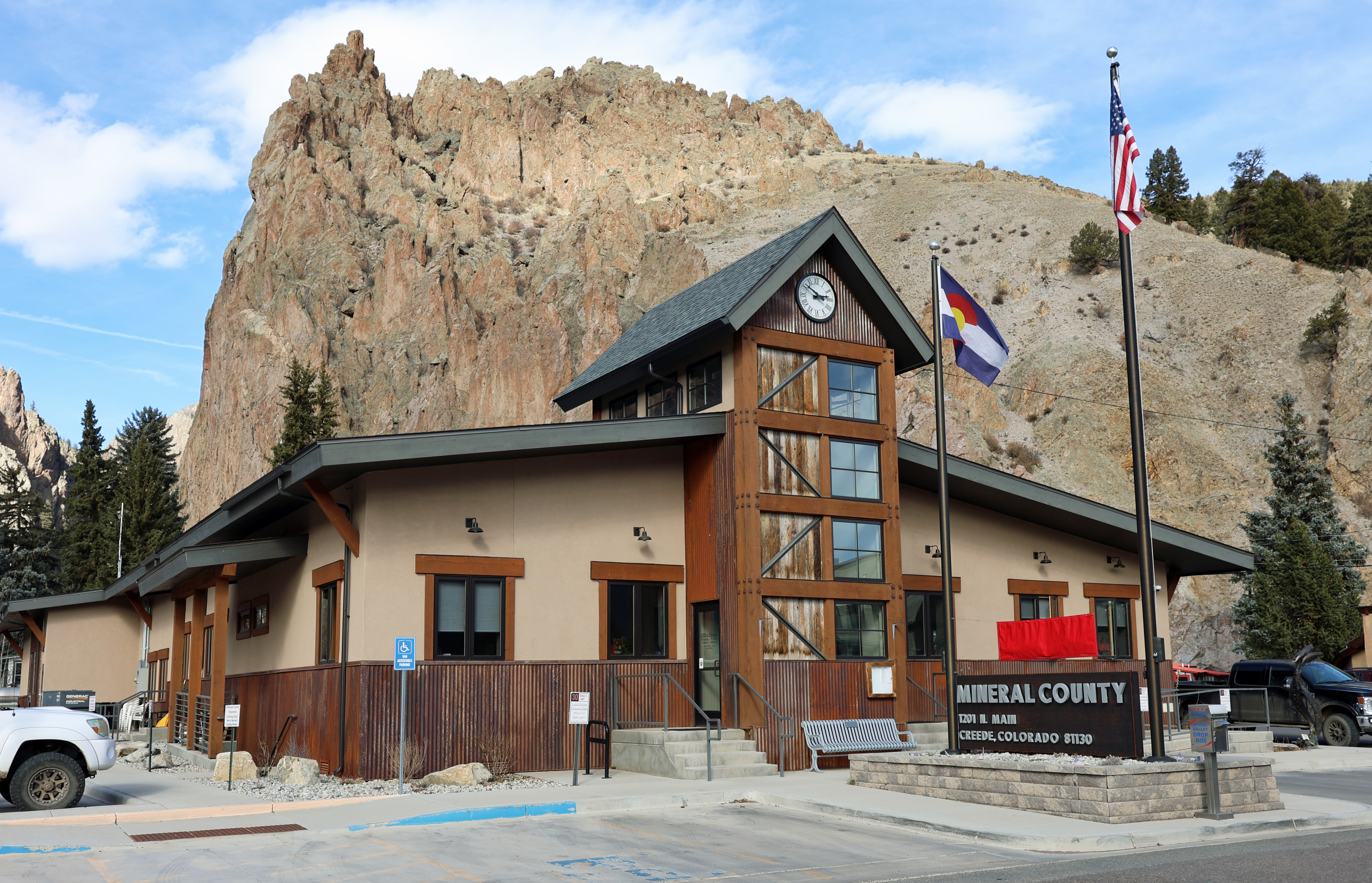
- The Mineral County Courthouse in Creede

- Location within the U.S. state of Colorado
- Coordinates: 37.69°N 106.93°W
- Country: United States
- State: Colorado
- Founded: March 27, 1893
- Seat: Creede
- Largest town: Creede

Area
  - Total: 878 sq mi (2,270 km^{2})
  - Land: 876 sq mi (2,270 km^{2})
  - Water: 2.0 sq mi (5.2 km^{2}) 0.2%

Population (2020)
  - Total: 865
  - Estimate (2025): 910 ▲
  - Density: 1/sq mi (0.39/km^{2})
- Time zone: UTC−7 (Mountain)
  - Summer (DST): UTC−6 (MDT)
- Congressional district: 3rd
- Website: www.mineralcountycolorado.com

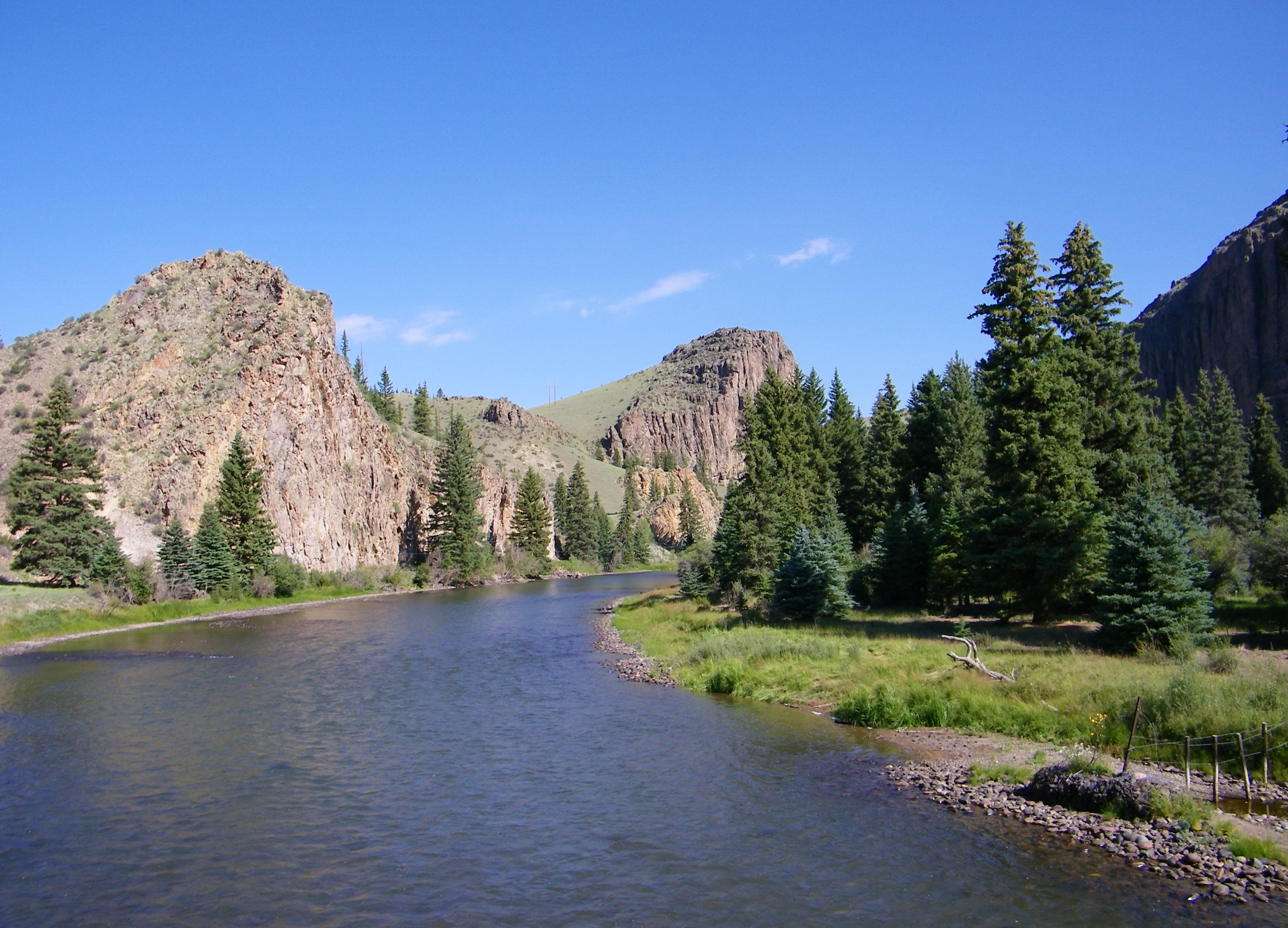
Rio Grande below Creede, Mineral County

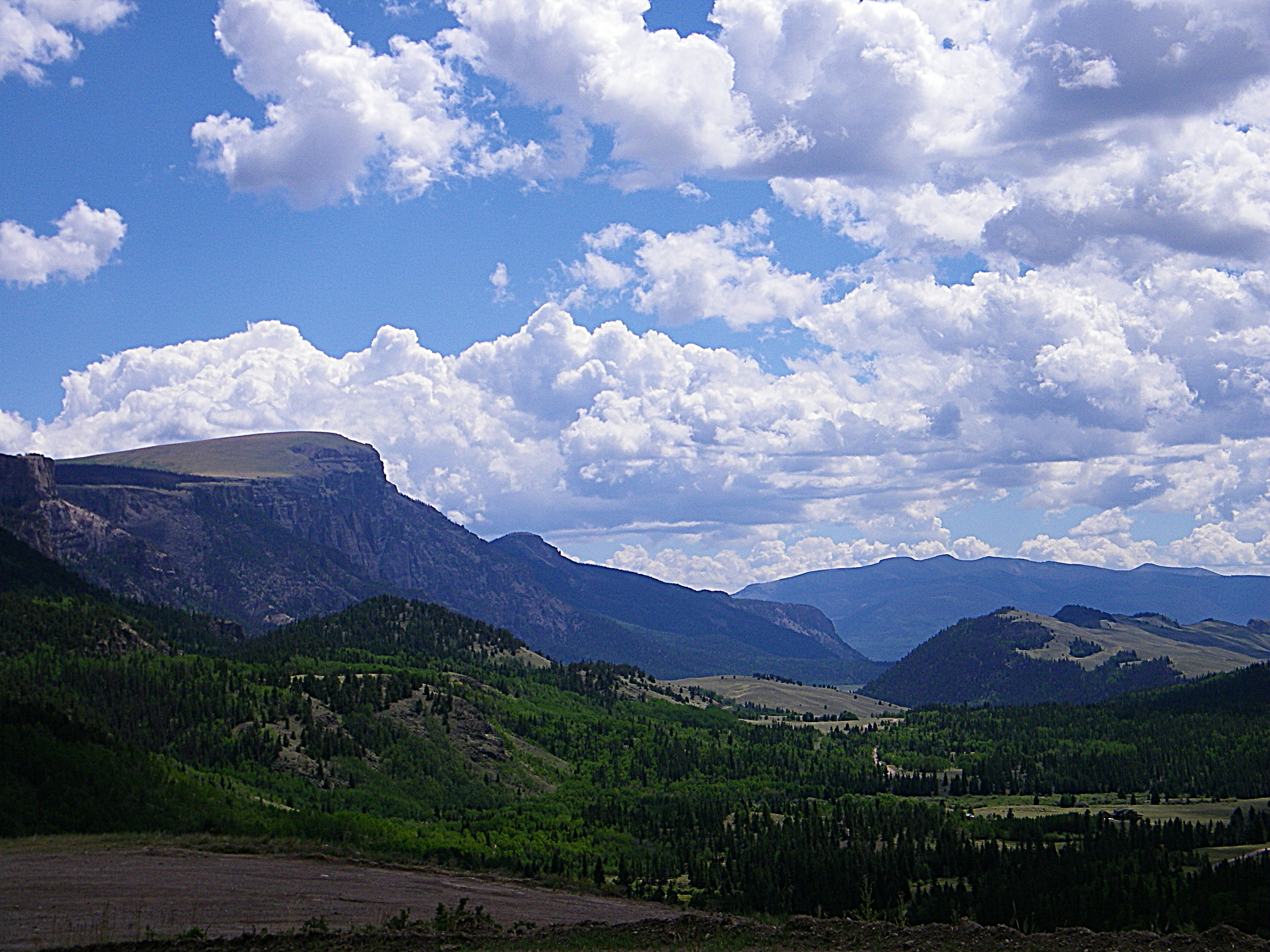
Bristol Head, el. 12,713 feet (3,875 meters).

Mineral County is a county located in the U.S. state of Colorado. As of the 2020 census, the population was 865, making it the third-least populous county in Colorado, behind San Juan County and Hinsdale County. The county seat and only incorporated municipality in the county is Creede. The county was named for the many valuable minerals found in the mountains and streams of the area.

== History ==
Before the Territory of Colorado was created in 1861, all of what is now western Colorado was occupied by the Nuche, commonly known as the Ute people. In 1866, Kit Carson, Ouray, and Nicaagat negotiated a treaty that in 1868 created the Ute Indian Reservation comprising all land in the Colorado Territory west of the 107th meridian west and south of the 40th parallel north: 25,780 square miles (66,800 km^{2}) or about 25% of Colorado. In 1869, White prospectors, illegally trespassing on the reservation, discovered silver in the San Juan Mountains. Seeking to open the San Juan Mountains to mining, the Brunot Agreement, ratified by Congress on April 24, 1874, forced the Ute people to cede 5,780 square miles (15,000 km^{2}) in the San Juan Mountains. Buoyed by renewed mining, Colorado was admitted to the Union as the 38th State on August 1, 1876.

In the summer of 1889, prospector Nicholas C. Creede (nee William Harvey) discovered "indications of silver" along Willow Creek in eastern Hinsdale County, and on June 26, 1890, Creede and G.L. Smith staked the Holy Moses mining claim. Several silver mining camps soon sprang up in the gulch, and the Creede Mining District was created in 1891.

On May 12, 1891, the Willow, Colorado, post office opened, but on July 1, 1891, the name was changed to Creede, Colorado. On January 25, 1892, the Amethyst, Colorado, post office opened near the Amethyst Mine at Jimtown just 1.1 miles (1.8 km) south of the Creede post office. The population of the area soon exceeded 7,000.

=== The two Creedes ===
In 1892, two rival municipalities named Creede were incorporated adjacent to one another in the Creede Mining District. On March 19, 1892, the Town of Creede was incorporated in the area around the Creede post office. On June 13, 1892, the rival City of Creede was incorporated in the area around the Amethyst post office.

On March 27, 1893, the Colorado legislature created Mineral County from portions of Hinsdale, Saguache, and Rio Grande counties. The legislature initially named the Wason camp as the original seat of the new county, but on November 7, 1893, county voters selected the City of Creede as the Mineral County Seat instead. However, the City of Creede continued to use its Amethyst postal address.

In an attempt to avoid further confusion, the United States Post Office Department changed the name of the Creede post office to North Creede, Colorado, on November 28 1908, and changed the name of the Amethyst post office to Creede, Colorado, on February 9, 1909.

As silver mining declined, both municipalities lost population, and in 1916, the City of Creede became a statutory town, but continued to use the appellation City of Creede to distinguish itself from its northern rival. On April 15, 1919, the North Creede post office closed, and the Town of Creede soon ceased operation. It was not until July 23, 2026, that the Colorado Secretary of State declared the Town of Creede abandoned.

The Geographic Names Information System (GNIS) uses the name "Town of the City of Creede" to identify the county seat and sole surviving municipality of Mineral County.

== Geography ==
According to the U.S. Census Bureau, the county has a total area of 878 square miles (2,270 km^{2}), of which 876 square miles (2,270 km^{2}) is land and 2.0 square miles (5.2 km^{2}) (0.2%) is water.

=== Adjacent counties ===
- Saguache County - northeast
- Rio Grande County - east
- Archuleta County - south
- Hinsdale County - west

=== Major highways ===
- U.S. Highway 160
- State Highway 149

=== National protected areas ===
- Rio Grande National Forest
- San Juan National Forest
- La Garita Wilderness
- Weminuche Wilderness

=== Trails and byways ===
- Colorado Trail
- Continental Divide National Scenic Trail
- Lake Fork National Recreation Trail
- Silver Thread Scenic Byway

== Demographics ==
Historical population
Census	Pop.	Note	%±
1900	1,913		—
1910	1,239		−35.2%
1920	779		−37.1%
1930	640		−17.8%
1940	975		52.3%
1950	698		−28.4%
1960	424		−39.3%
1970	786		85.4%
1980	804		2.3%
1990	558		−30.6%
2000	831		48.9%
2010	712		−14.3%
2020	865		21.5%
2025 (est.)	910	▲	5.2%
U.S. Decennial Census; 1790-1960 1900-1990; 1990-2000 2010-2020

=== 2020 census ===
As of the 2020 census, the county had a population of 865. Of the residents, 10.6% were under the age of 18 and 34.2% were 65 years of age or older; the median age was 56.8 years. For every 100 females there were 97.9 males, and for every 100 females age 18 and over there were 97.7 males. 0.0% of residents lived in urban areas and 100.0% lived in rural areas.

Mineral County, Colorado – Racial and ethnic composition Note: the US Census treats Hispanic/Latino as an ethnic category. This table excludes Latinos from the racial categories and assigns them to a separate category. Hispanics/Latinos may be of any race.
Race / Ethnicity (NH = Non-Hispanic)	Pop 2000	Pop 2010	Pop 2020	% 2000	% 2010	% 2020
White alone (NH)	793	678	775	95.43%	95.22%	89.60%
Black or African American alone (NH)	0	2	0	0.00%	0.28%	0.00%
Native American or Alaska Native alone (NH)	4	4	4	0.48%	0.56%	0.46%
Asian alone (NH)	0	1	3	0.00%	0.14%	0.35%
Pacific Islander alone (NH)	0	0	0	0.00%	0.00%	0.00%
Other race alone (NH)	0	0	0	0.00%	0.00%	0.00%
Mixed race or Multiracial (NH)	17	6	36	2.05%	0.84%	4.16%
Hispanic or Latino (any race)	17	21	47	2.05%	2.95%	5.43%
Total	831	712	865	100.00%	100.00%	100.00%

The racial makeup of the county was 91.2% White, 0.3% Black or African American, 0.7% American Indian and Alaska Native, 0.3% Asian, 0.0% Native Hawaiian and Pacific Islander, 0.0% from some other race, and 7.4% from two or more races. Hispanic or Latino residents of any race comprised 5.4% of the population.

There were 424 households in the county, of which 19.6% had children under the age of 18 living with them and 22.9% had a female householder with no spouse or partner present. About 26.7% of all households were made up of individuals and 12.9% had someone living alone who was 65 years of age or older.

There were 1,215 housing units, of which 65.1% were vacant. Among occupied housing units, 80.2% were owner-occupied and 19.8% were renter-occupied. The homeowner vacancy rate was 3.4% and the rental vacancy rate was 6.2%.

=== 2000 census ===
At the 2000 census, there were 831 people in 377 households, including 251 families, in the county. The population density was 1 people per square mile (0.39 people/km^{2}). There were 1,119 housing units at an average density of 1 units per square mile (0.39 units/km^{2}). The racial makeup of the county was 96.87% White, 0.84% Native American, 0.12% from other races, and 2.17% from two or more races. 2.05% of the population were Hispanic or Latino of any race.

Of the 377 households 22.30% had children under the age of 18 living with them, 57.00% were married couples living together, 5.80% had a female householder with no husband present, and 33.40% were non-families. 28.10% of households were one person and 9.80% were one person aged 65 or older. The average household size was 2.20 and the average family size was 2.70.

The age distribution was 20.50% under the age of 18, 4.70% from 18 to 24, 24.80% from 25 to 44, 32.70% from 45 to 64, and 17.30% 65 or older. The median age was 45 years. For every 100 females there were 104.20 males. For every 100 females age 18 and over, there were 99.10 males.

The median household income was $34,844 and the median family income was $40,833. Males had a median income of $28,750 versus $19,375 for females. The per capita income for the county was $24,475. About 9.30% of families and 10.20% of the population were below the poverty line, including 18.70% of those under age 18 and 10.60% of those age 65 or over.

Mineral County has an extremely high proportion of land under federal ownership, with 95% of the county under the management of the federal government (It houses an office of, and is surrounded by, the Rio Grande National Forest).

=== 2015 ===
As of 2015 the largest self-reported ancestry groups in Mineral County, Colorado are:

Largest ancestries (2015)	Percent
English (England)	22.5%
German (Germany)	19.9%
Irish (Republic of Ireland)	13.9%
"American" (United States)	7.5%

== Politics ==
Like neighboring Hinsdale County, Mineral County leans Republican. It has only voted for Democrats twice since 1968 (although heavy third-party swing had a major role to play in each). Up through 1968, it was a Democratic-leaning swing county.

United States presidential election results for Mineral County, Colorado
Year	Republican		Democratic		Third party(ies)	
Year	No.	%	No.	%	No.	%
1896	11	1.34%	808	98.30%	3	0.36%
1900	208	22.73%	700	76.50%	7	0.77%
1904	306	33.59%	575	63.12%	30	3.29%
1908	218	29.99%	488	67.13%	21	2.89%
1912	186	28.93%	286	44.48%	171	26.59%
1916	135	29.16%	278	60.04%	50	10.80%
1920	183	49.33%	146	39.35%	42	11.32%
1924	150	46.01%	101	30.98%	75	23.01%
1928	144	41.14%	187	53.43%	19	5.43%
1932	112	29.55%	210	55.41%	57	15.04%
1936	126	30.22%	285	68.35%	6	1.44%
1940	229	45.08%	273	53.74%	6	1.18%
1944	170	52.80%	150	46.58%	2	0.62%
1948	144	42.99%	190	56.72%	1	0.30%
1952	209	67.86%	98	31.82%	1	0.32%
1956	168	62.69%	99	36.94%	1	0.37%
1960	146	47.87%	158	51.80%	1	0.33%
1964	89	30.17%	204	69.15%	2	0.68%
1968	116	43.77%	126	47.55%	23	8.68%
1972	247	70.98%	96	27.59%	5	1.44%
1976	235	55.56%	167	39.48%	21	4.96%
1980	271	60.22%	125	27.78%	54	12.00%
1984	333	72.55%	117	25.49%	9	1.96%
1988	217	55.08%	174	44.16%	3	0.76%
1992	159	35.41%	171	38.08%	119	26.50%
1996	179	40.04%	192	42.95%	76	17.00%
2000	294	60.49%	168	34.57%	24	4.94%
2004	383	61.87%	227	36.67%	9	1.45%
2008	334	53.61%	270	43.34%	19	3.05%
2012	344	52.92%	291	44.77%	15	2.31%
2016	344	52.76%	237	36.35%	71	10.89%
2020	427	56.48%	317	41.93%	12	1.59%
2024	417	55.38%	317	42.10%	19	2.52%

United States Senate election results for Mineral County, Colorado2
Year	Republican		Democratic		Third party(ies)	
Year	No.	%	No.	%	No.	%
2020	437	57.73%	302	39.89%	18	2.38%

United States Senate election results for Mineral County, Colorado3
Year	Republican		Democratic		Third party(ies)	
Year	No.	%	No.	%	No.	%
2022	369	52.05%	310	43.72%	30	4.23%

Colorado Gubernatorial election results for Mineral County
Year	Republican		Democratic		Third party(ies)	
Year	No.	%	No.	%	No.	%
2022	362	51.13%	320	45.20%	26	3.67%

== Communities ==
=== Town ===
- Creede

=== Unincorporated communities ===
- Spar City
- Wagon Wheel Gap

=== Ghost towns ===
- Bachelor City
- Wason, Colorado
- Weaver

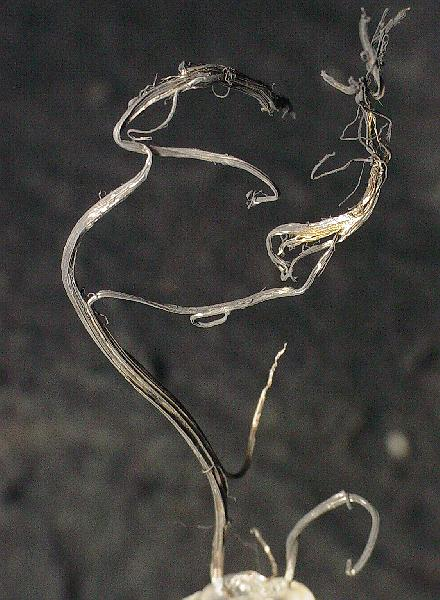
Native silver from the Bulldog Mountain Mine, Creede District. Size 4.5 x 2.6 x 0.25 cm.

== See also ==
- Bibliography of Colorado
- Geography of Colorado
- History of Colorado
  - National Register of Historic Places listings in Mineral County, Colorado
- Index of Colorado-related articles
- List of Colorado-related lists
  - List of counties in Colorado
- Outline of Colorado
