= Creede, Colorado =

Town in Colorado, United States

- Statutory town
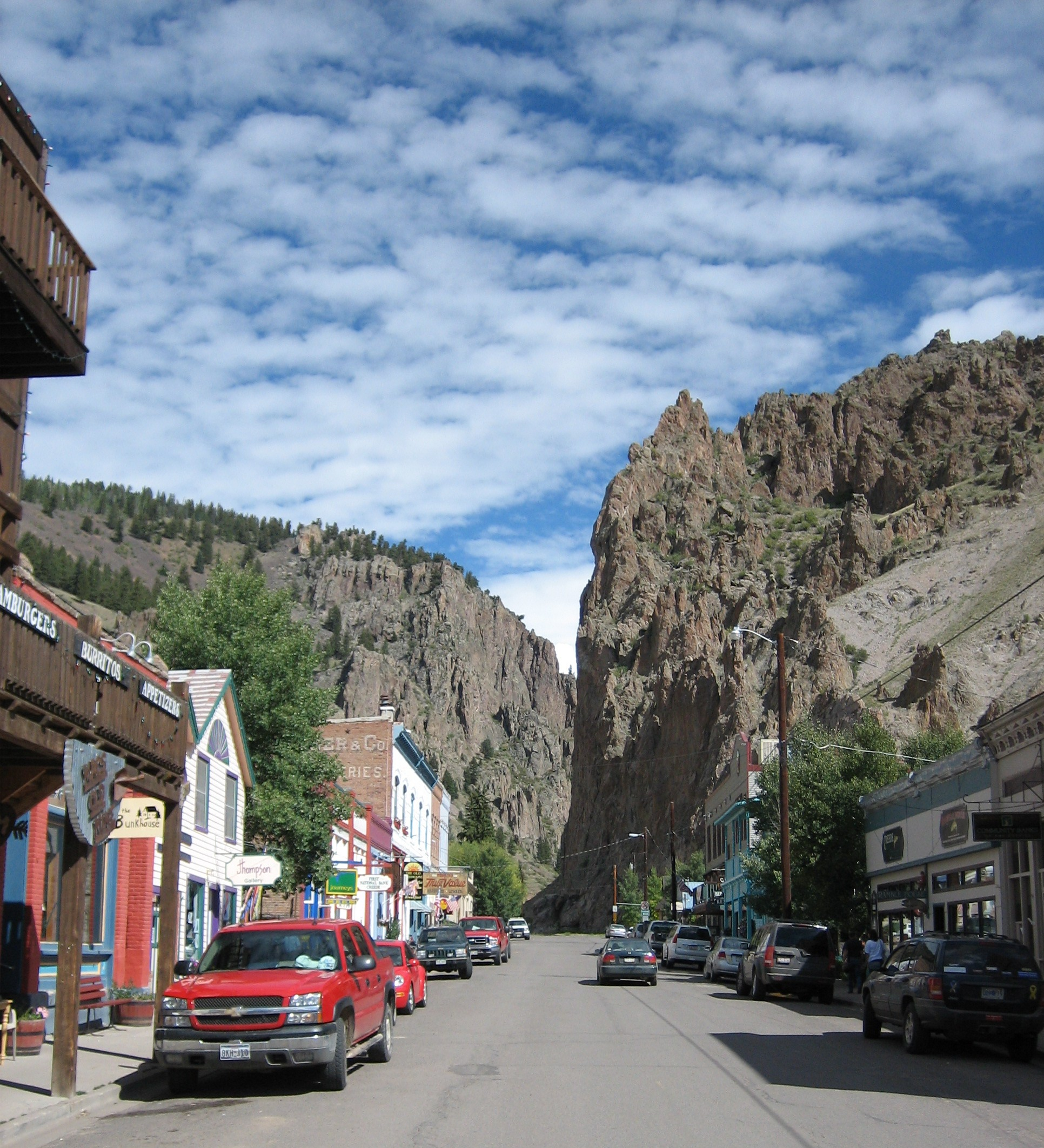
- Downtown Creede in 2005

- Seal

- Location of the City of Creede in Mineral County, Colorado
- Coordinates: 37°50′44″N 106°55′31″W
- Country: United States
- State: Colorado
- County: Mineral
- Incorporated: May 19, 1892

Government
  - Type: Statutory town

Area
  - Total: 0.950 sq mi (2.460 km^{2})
  - Land: 0.950 sq mi (2.460 km^{2})
  - Water: 0 sq mi (0.000 km^{2})
- Elevation: 8,800 ft (2,700 m)

Population (2020)
  - Total: 257
  - Density: 377/sq mi (146/km^{2})
- Time zone: UTC−07:00 (MST)
  - Summer (DST): UTC−06:00 (MDT)
- ZIP Code: 81130
- Area code: 719
- GNIS ID: 2412384
- FIPS code: 14765
- Website: cityofcreede.gov

The City of Creede is the statutory town that is the county seat of Mineral County, Colorado, United States. (Note: The statutory town of Creede, Colorado, uses the title City of Creede to distinguish itself from its former rival the Town of Creede.) It is the most populous community and the sole surviving incorporated municipality in the county. The town population was 257 at the 2020 United States census.

== History ==
Before the Territory of Colorado was created in 1861, all of what is now western Colorado was occupied by the Nuche, commonly known as the Ute people. In 1866, Kit Carson, Ouray, and Nicaagat negotiated a treaty that in 1868 created the Ute Indian Reservation comprising all land in the Colorado Territory west of the 107th meridian west and south of the 40th parallel north: 25,780 square miles (66,800 km^{2}) or about 25% of Colorado. In 1869, White prospectors, illegally trespassing on the reservation, discovered silver in the San Juan Mountains. Seeking to open the San Juan Mountains to mining, the Brunot Agreement, ratified by Congress on April 24, 1874, forced the Ute people to cede 5,780 square miles (15,000 km^{2}) in the San Juan Mountains. Buoyed by renewed mining, Colorado was admitted to the Union as the 38th State on August 1, 1876.

In the summer of 1889, prospector Nicholas C. Creede (nee William Harvey) discovered "indications of silver" along Willow Creek in eastern Hinsdale County, and on June 26, 1890, Creede and G.L. Smith staked the Holy Moses mining claim. Several silver mining camps soon sprang up in the gulch, and the Creede Mining District was created in 1891.

On May 12, 1891, the Willow, Colorado, post office opened, but on July 1, 1891, the name was changed to Creede, Colorado. On January 25, 1892, the Amethyst, Colorado, post office opened near the Amethyst Mine at Jimtown just 1.1 miles (1.8 km) south of the Creede post office. The population of the area soon exceeded 7,000.

=== The two Creedes ===
In 1892, two rival municipalities named Creede were incorporated adjacent to one another in the Creede Mining District. On March 19, 1892, the Town of Creede was incorporated in the area around the Creede post office. On June 13, 1892, the rival City of Creede was incorporated in the area around the Amethyst post office.

On March 27, 1893, the Colorado legislature created Mineral County from portions of Hinsdale, Saguache, and Rio Grande counties. The legislature initially named the Wason camp as the original seat of the new county, but on November 7, 1893, county voters selected the City of Creede as the Mineral County Seat instead. However, the City of Creede continued to use its Amethyst postal address.

In an attempt to avoid further confusion, the United States Post Office Department changed the name of the Creede post office to North Creede, Colorado, on November 28 1908, and then changed the name of the Amethyst post office to Creede, Colorado, on February 9, 1909.

As silver mining declined, both municipalities lost population, and in 1916, the City of Creede became a statutory town, but continued to use the appellation City of Creede to distinguish itself from its northern rival. On April 15, 1919, the North Creede post office closed, and the Town of Creede soon ceased operation. It was not until July 23, 2026, that the Colorado Secretary of State declared the Town of Creede abandoned.

The Geographic Names Information System (GNIS) uses the name "Town of the City of Creede" to identify the county seat and sole surviving municipality of Mineral County.

=== There is no night in Creede ===
In the 19th century, Creede was the last silver boom town in Colorado. It leapt from a population of 600 in 1889 to more than 10,000 in December 1891. The Creede mines operated continuously from 1890 until 1985, and were served by the Denver & Rio Grande Railroad.

While Creede was booming, the capital city of Denver, Colorado was experiencing a reform movement against gambling clubs and saloons. Numerous owners of gambling houses in Denver relocated to Creede's business district. One of these was confidence man Jefferson Randolph "Soapy" Smith. Soapy became the uncrowned king of Creede's criminal underworld, and opened the Orleans Club. Other famous people in Creede were Robert Ford (the man who killed outlaw Jesse James), Bat Masterson, and William Sidney "Cap" Light (the first deputy sheriff in Creede, and brother-in-law of Soapy Smith). On June 5, 1892, a fire destroyed most of the business district. Three days later, on June 8, Ed O'Kelley walked into Robert Ford's makeshift tent-saloon and shot him dead. The anti-gambling movement in Denver had ceased, and the Denver businessmen moved back to their former areas of operation.

Creede's boom lasted until 1893, when the Silver Panic hit the silver mining towns in Colorado. The price of silver plummeted, and most of the silver mines were closed. Creede never became a ghost town, although the boom was over and its population declined. After 1900, Creede stayed alive by relying increasingly on lead and zinc in the ores. Total production through 1966 was 58 million ozt (1,800 t) of silver, 150 thousand ozt (4.7 t) of gold, 112 thousand metric tons of lead, 34 thousand metric tons of zinc, and 2 million metric tons of copper.

== Geography ==
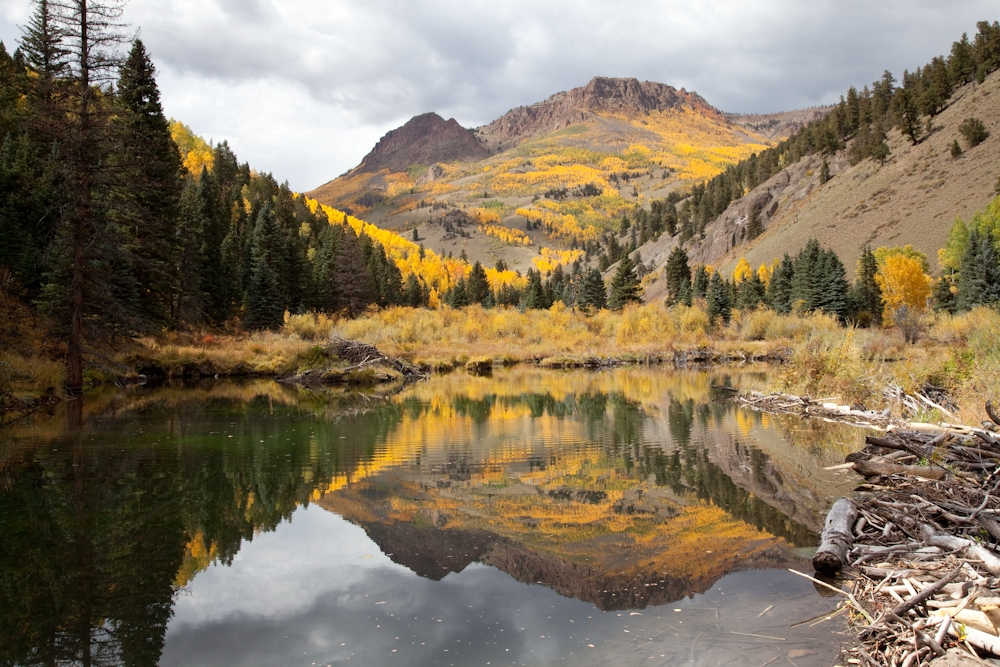
Shallow Creek, west of Creede, CO

Creede is located along Willow Creek, a tributary of the Rio Grande. The Rio Grande flows through the San Juan Mountains and San Luis Valley of Colorado before entering New Mexico. The Rio Grande forms the border between Texas and the Mexican states of Chihuahua, Coahuila, Nuevo León, and Tamaulipas before flowing into the Gulf of Mexico.

The river has played a critical role in the development of farming and ranching in the Valley. The Rio Grande and its tributary trout streams provide excellent opportunities for fly fishermen and its unspoiled headwaters in the Weminuche Wilderness are a favorite for hikers.

At the 2020 United States census, the town had a total area of 608 acres (2.460 km^{2}), all of it land.

=== Climate ===
Climate data for Creede, Colorado, 1991–2020 normals, extremes 2007–present
Month	Jan	Feb	Mar	Apr	May	Jun	Jul	Aug	Sep	Oct	Nov	Dec	Year
Record high °F (°C)	58 (14)	56 (13)	66 (19)	73 (23)	79 (26)	89 (32)	91 (33)	88 (31)	86 (30)	80 (27)	77 (25)	58 (14)	91 (33)
Mean daily maximum °F (°C)	32.9 (0.5)	37.6 (3.1)	45.9 (7.7)	54.1 (12.3)	63.2 (17.3)	74.8 (23.8)	78.9 (26.1)	75.0 (23.9)	70.1 (21.2)	60.7 (15.9)	45.6 (7.6)	32.6 (0.3)	56.0 (13.3)
Daily mean °F (°C)	11.6 (−11.3)	16.6 (−8.6)	28.2 (−2.1)	37.3 (2.9)	45.0 (7.2)	53.6 (12.0)	59.7 (15.4)	57.5 (14.2)	51.0 (10.6)	40.4 (4.7)	26.8 (−2.9)	12.5 (−10.8)	36.7 (2.6)
Mean daily minimum °F (°C)	−9.8 (−23.2)	−4.3 (−20.2)	10.5 (−11.9)	20.6 (−6.3)	26.8 (−2.9)	32.5 (0.3)	40.4 (4.7)	40.1 (4.5)	32.0 (0.0)	20.2 (−6.6)	8.0 (−13.3)	−7.6 (−22.0)	17.5 (−8.1)
Record low °F (°C)	−40 (−40)	−31 (−35)	−18 (−28)	1 (−17)	8 (−13)	16 (−9)	23 (−5)	23 (−5)	19 (−7)	−8 (−22)	−13 (−25)	−42 (−41)	−42 (−41)
Average precipitation inches (mm)	0.84 (21)	0.76 (19)	0.97 (25)	1.05 (27)	1.02 (26)	0.82 (21)	2.03 (52)	2.73 (69)	1.74 (44)	1.29 (33)	1.22 (31)	0.66 (17)	15.13 (385)
Source 1: NOAA
Source 2: National Weather Service

== Demographics ==
Historical population
Census	Pop.	Note	%±
1900	938		—
1910	741		−21.0%
1920	500		−32.5%
1930	384		−23.2%
1940	670		74.5%
1950	503		−24.9%
1960	350		−30.4%
1970	653		86.6%
1980	610		−6.6%
1990	362		−40.7%
2000	377		4.1%
2010	290		−23.1%
2020	257		−11.4%
U.S. Decennial Census

As of the census of 2000, there were 377 people, 181 households, and 106 families residing in the town. The population density was 622.4 inhabitants per square mile (240.3/km^{2}). There were 275 housing units at an average density of 454.0 units per square mile (175.3 units/km^{2}). The racial makeup of the town was 96.82% White, 1.33% Native American, and 1.86% from two or more races. Hispanic or Latino of any race were 1.59% of the population.

There were 181 households, out of which 19.3% had children under the age of 18 living with them, 46.4% were married couples living together, 8.8% had a female householder with no husband present, and 41.4% were non-families. 33.1% of all households were made up of individuals, and 12.2% had someone living alone who was 65 years of age or older. The average household size was 2.08 and the average family size was 2.70.

In the town, the population was spread out, with 19.1% under the age of 18, 5.0% from 18 to 24, 26.3% from 25 to 44, 33.7% from 45 to 64, and 15.9% who were 65 years of age or older. The median age was 45 years. For every 100 females, there were 100.5 males. For every 100 females age 18 and over, there were 98.1 males.

The median income for a household in the town was $30,893, and the median income for a family was $34,125. Males had a median income of $27,250 versus $17,250 for females. The per capita income for the town was $21,801. About 12.2% of families and 13.4% of the population were below the poverty line, including 31.0% of those under age 18 and 11.1% of those age 65 or over.

== Arts and culture ==
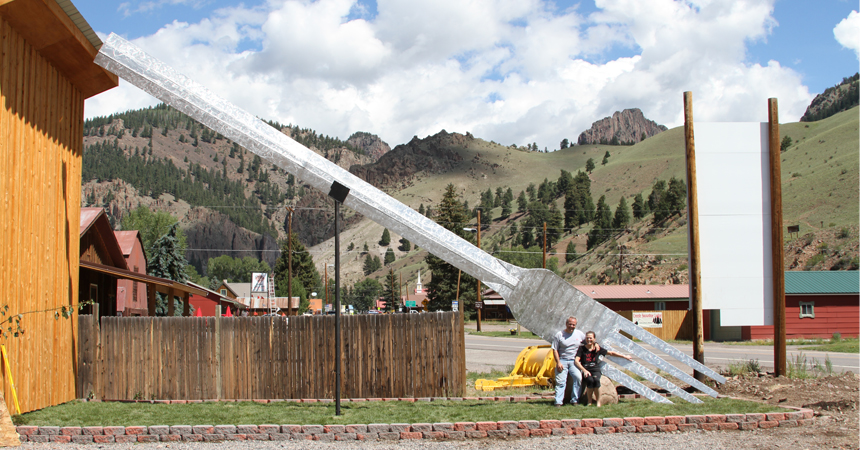
Creede Fork, said to be the World's Largest

The Creede Fork, also known as the World's Largest Fork, is a 40-foot aluminum sculpture and roadside attraction in Creede built in 2012. It is the largest fork in the United States, beating out the 35-foot-long (11 m) fork in Missouri that previously held the record. Created by artists Chev and Ted Yund, the fork is made of aluminum and weighs over 600 pounds (270 kg). In January 2018, it was named by The Daily Meal as the weirdest tourist attraction in Colorado.

The fork was commissioned by Keith Siddel as a birthday present for his wife, Denise Dutwiler. Siddel hired two local artists, Chev and Ted Yund, to create the structure. The fork was designed specifically to out-measure the Giant Fork in Springfield, Missouri, which previously held the record of being the longest fork in the United States at a length of 35 feet.

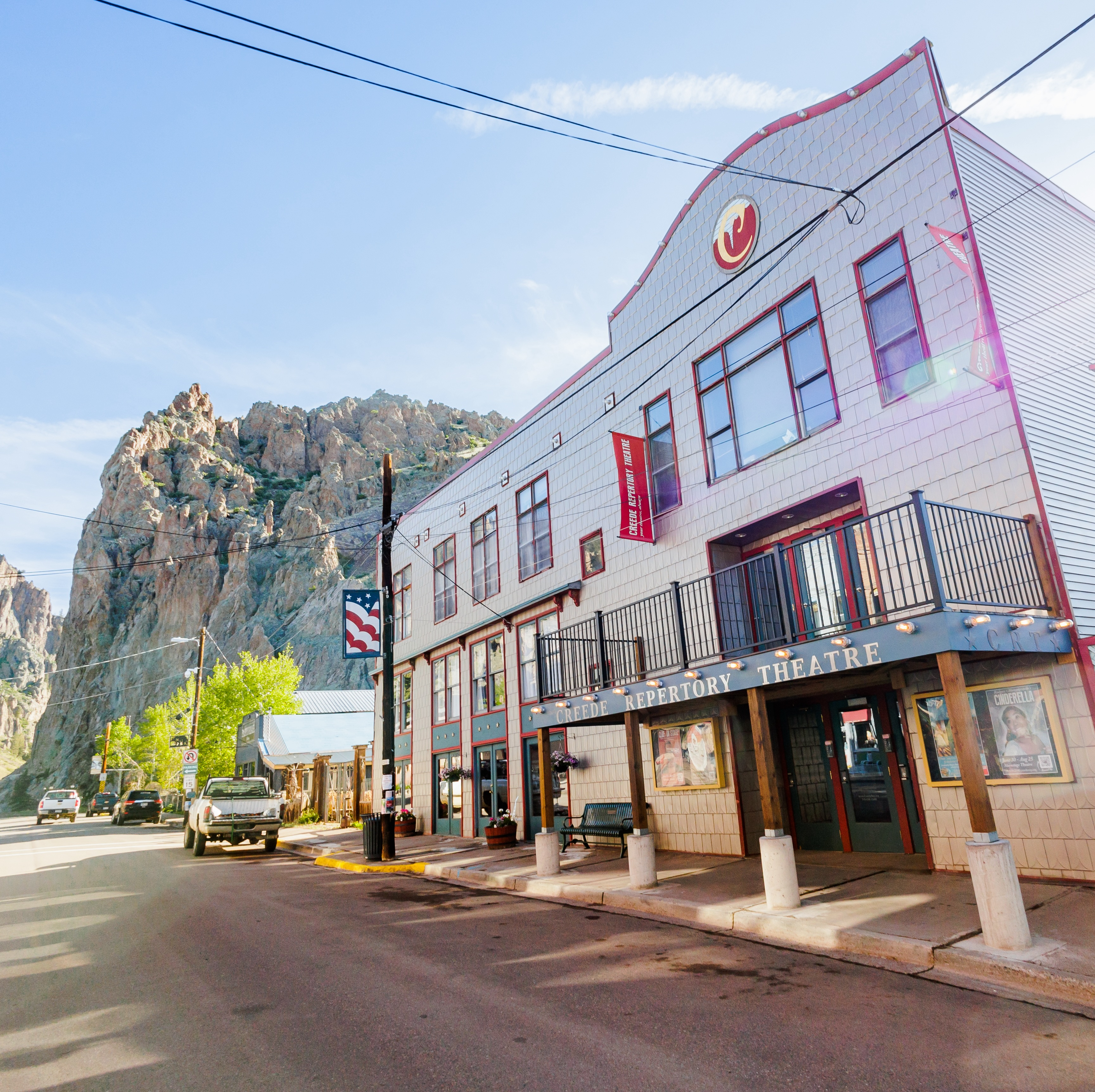
The Mainstage Theatre in 2023 with Creede's famous cliffs in the background.

The Creede Repertory Theatre was founded in 1966 by twelve University of Kansas students who answered the call from the Creede Junior Chamber of Commerce (Jaycees). It has since grown to a fully professional theatre company with an operating budget of over $1.5 million. Its annual production schedule includes a variety of plays, musicals, and new work, as well as musical events and concerts. Creede Rep is a true rotating repertory company which means that a visitor to the area can see up to five different shows in one weekend. In addition to these performances, the theatre offers a program for the development of new works, as well as nationally recognized and robust educational programming. Creede Repertory Theatre has received many nominations fort its work by the Colorado Theatre Guild's Henry Awards including Best New Play, Best Scenic Design, and numerous nominations for individual performances. Creede Repertory Theatre performs in two spaces, its historic Mainstage Theatre (originally a movie house in the 1930s) and the a more modern, flexible space that opened in 2011, the Ruth Humphreys Brown Theatre (The Ruth). Audiences can see shows and events in both spaces during the summer season and in The Ruth in October–April.

== In popular culture ==
Poet and journalist Cy Warman wrote two poems about Creede, Creede (commonly known as And there is no night in Creede) and The Rise and Fall of Creede.

== Gallery ==
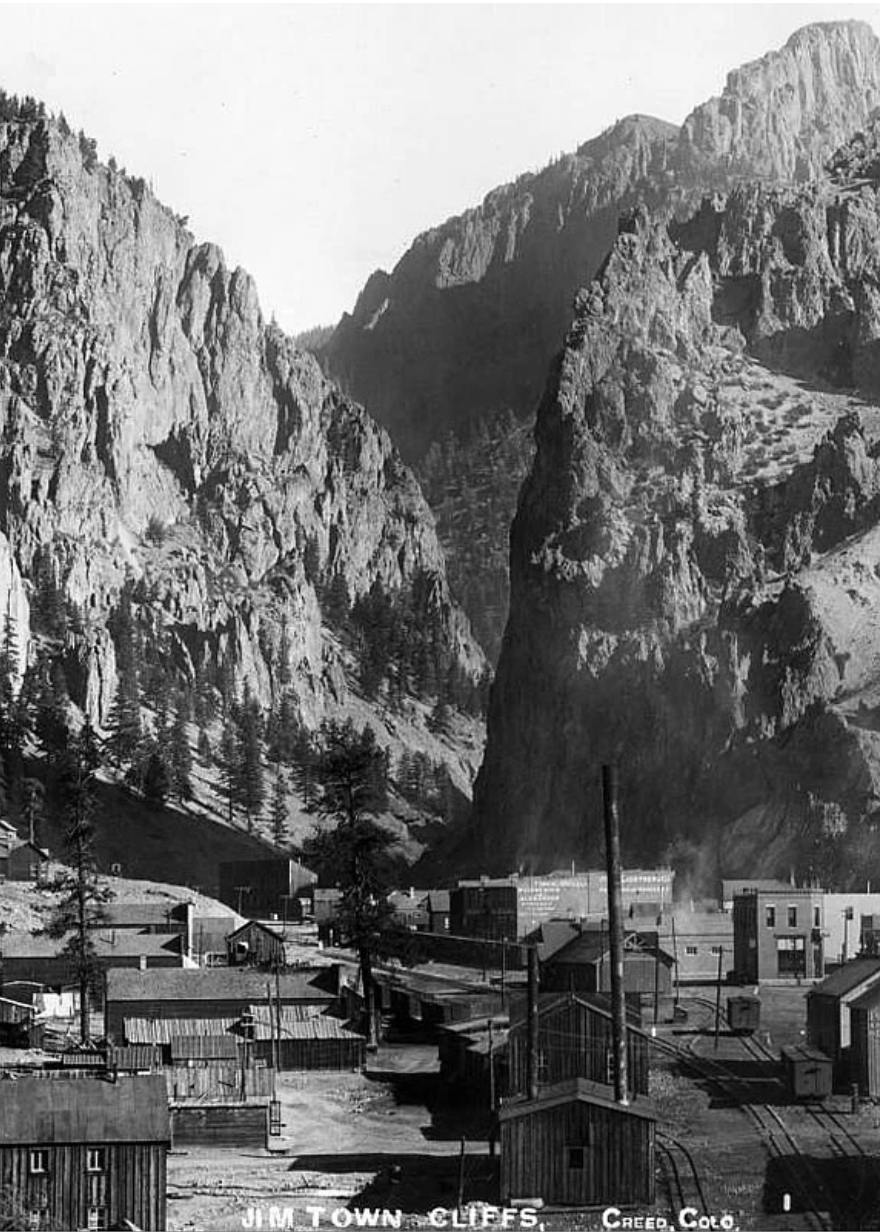
Jim Town Cliffs above Creede, c. 1893.

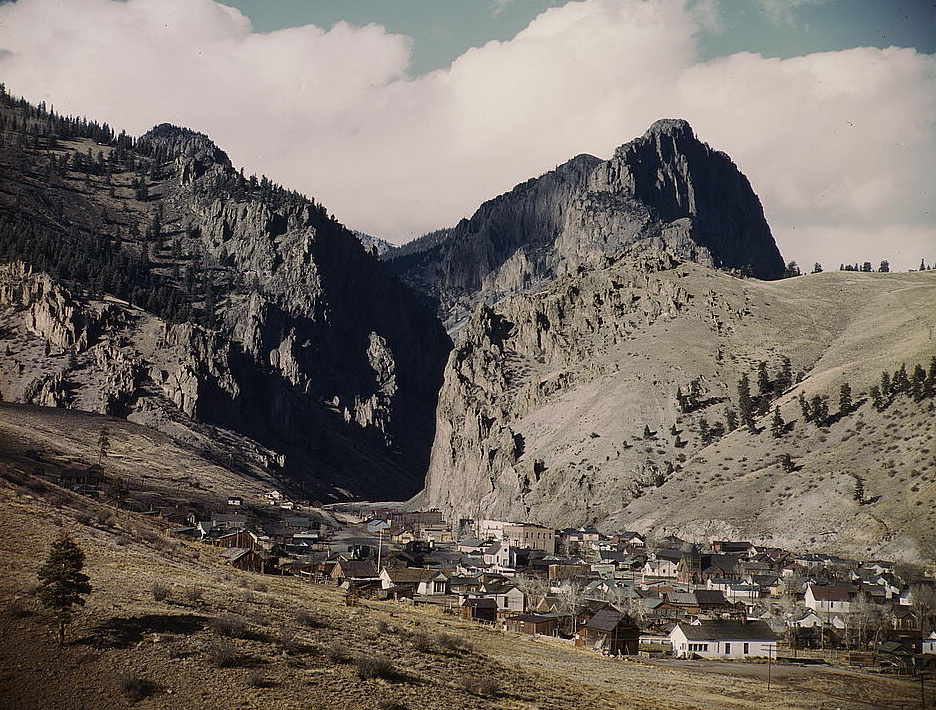
Creede in 1942, photo by Andreas Feininger.

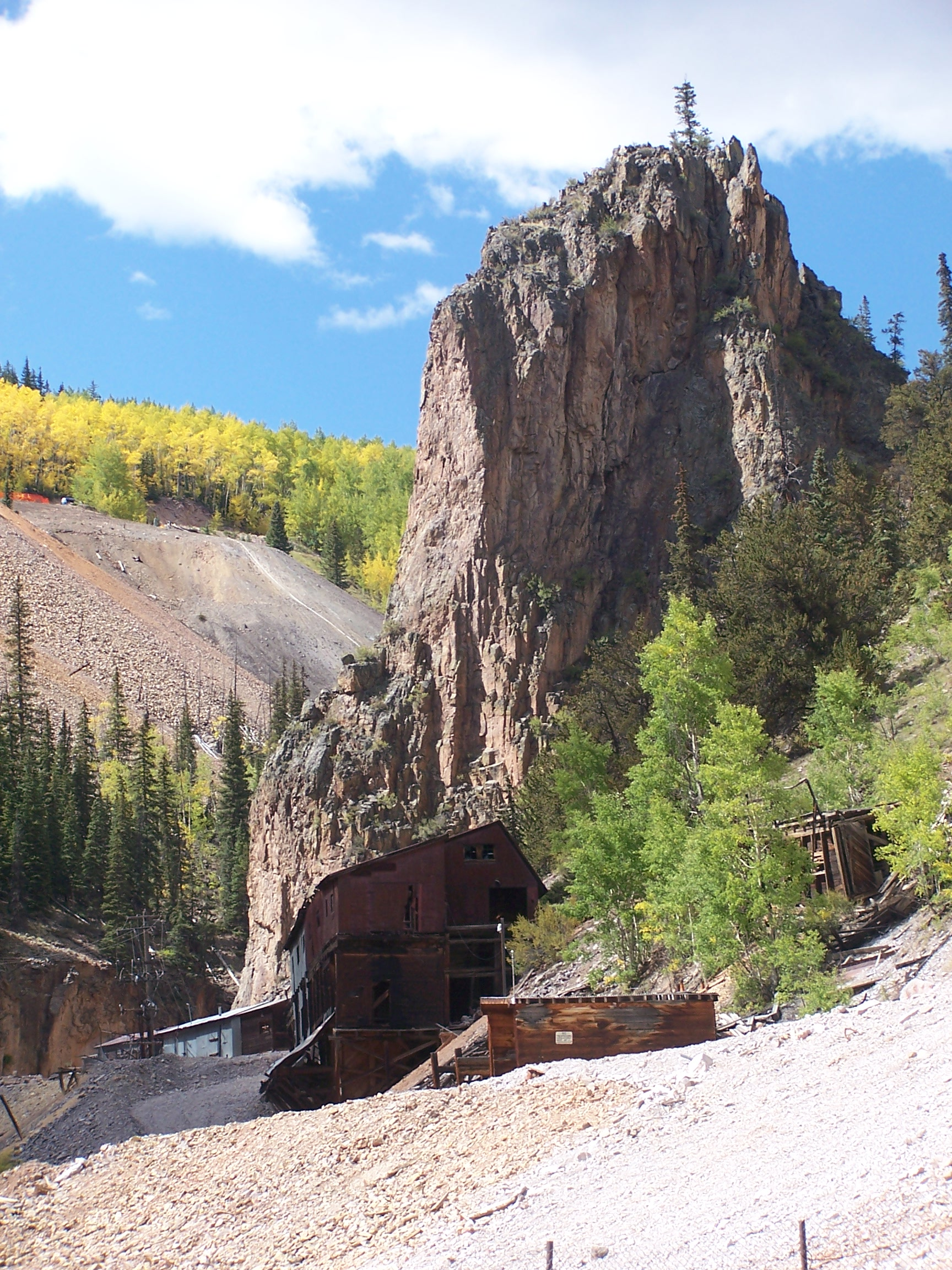
Old mine on the Bachelor Loop historic driving tour.

== See also ==
- Bibliography of Colorado
- Geography of Colorado
- History of Colorado
  - National Register of Historic Places listings in Mineral County, Colorado
- Index of Colorado-related articles
- List of Colorado-related lists
  - List of county seats in Colorado
  - List of municipalities in Colorado
  - List of populated places in Colorado
- Outline of Colorado
