= Radišič =

Radišič or Radisich may refer to:

- Aleksandar Radišić (born 1984), Serbian para-athlete
- Jaye Radisich (1976–2012), Australian politician
- Nika Radišič (born 2000), Slovenian tennis player
- Paul Radisich (born 1962), New Zealand racing driver
- Tatjana Radisic (born 1973), Serbian costume designer
- Živko Radišić (born 1937), Bosnian politician
