= 1904 United States presidential election in Colorado =

- November 8, 1904
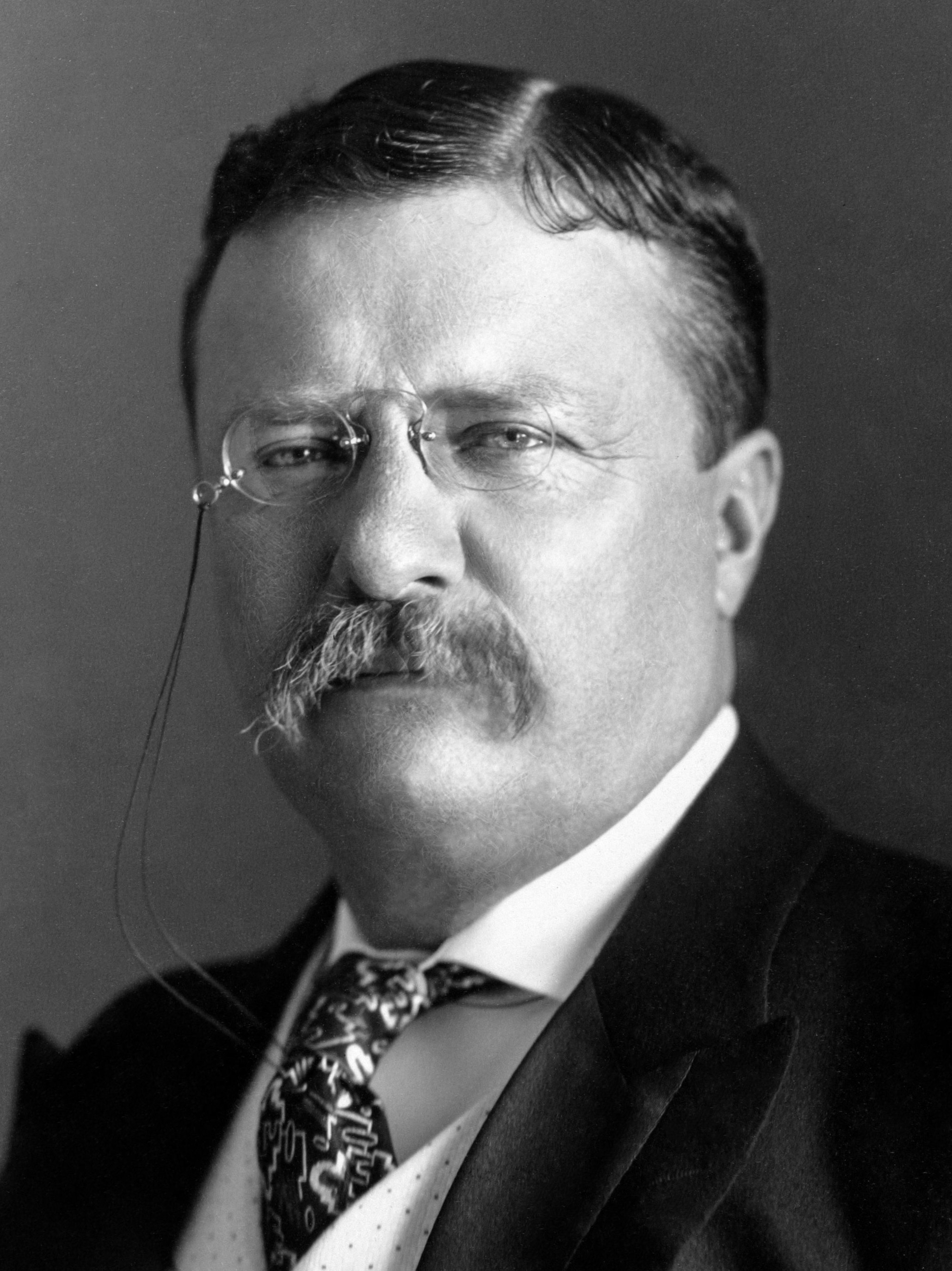

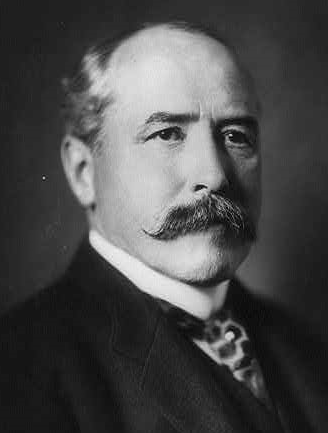
Nominee	Theodore Roosevelt	Alton B. Parker
Party	Republican	Democratic
Home state	New York	New York
Running mate	Charles W. Fairbanks	Henry G. Davis
Electoral vote	5	0
Popular vote	134,687	100,105
Percentage	55.27%	41.08%
County results
Roosevelt
40–50%
50–60%
60–70%
70–80%
Parker
40–50%
50–60%
60–70%
President before election
Theodore Roosevelt
Republican
Elected President
Theodore Roosevelt
Republican

The 1904 United States presidential election in Colorado took place on November 8, 1904. All contemporary 45 states were part of the 1904 United States presidential election. State voters chose five electors to the Electoral College, which selected the president and vice president.

Colorado was won by the Republican nominees, incumbent President Theodore Roosevelt of New York and his running mate Charles W. Fairbanks of Indiana. They defeated the Democratic nominees, former Chief Judge of New York Court of Appeals Alton B. Parker and his running mate, former US Senator Henry G. Davis of West Virginia. Roosevelt won the state by a margin of 14.18%.

Roosevelt's victory in Colorado was part of a national landslide. He was the only Republican candidate to win the state between 1888 and 1920.

== Results ==
General election results
Party	Pledged to	Elector	Votes
Republican Party	Theodore Roosevelt	John C. Osgood	134,687
Republican Party	Theodore Roosevelt	David H. Moffat	134,681
Republican Party	Theodore Roosevelt	Simon Guggenheim	134,661
Republican Party	Theodore Roosevelt	Percy S. Rider	134,486
Republican Party	Theodore Roosevelt	Phillip B. Stewart	134,311
Democratic Party	Alton B. Parker	James F. Burns	100,105
Democratic Party	Alton B. Parker	Charles J. Hughes Jr.	100,049
Democratic Party	Alton B. Parker	Adair Wilson	99,998
Democratic Party	Alton B. Parker	A. W. Rucker	99,974
Democratic Party	Alton B. Parker	Thomas J. Zollars	99,899
Socialist Party	Eugene V. Debs	Mordecai Larkin	4,304
Socialist Party	Eugene V. Debs	Amos Slater	4,290
Socialist Party	Eugene V. Debs	William Schlessinger	4,280
Socialist Party	Eugene V. Debs	J. P. Speirs	4,270
Socialist Party	Eugene V. Debs	William J. Vialon	4,252
Prohibition Party	Silas C. Swallow	Antoinette A. Hawley	3,438
Prohibition Party	Silas C. Swallow	Edwin C. Long	3,432
Prohibition Party	Silas C. Swallow	Thomas E. Taylor	3,431
Prohibition Party	Silas C. Swallow	John N. Scouller	3,425
Prohibition Party	Silas C. Swallow	Ernest S. Turner	3,420
People's Party	Thomas E. Watson	John Barnd	824
People's Party	Thomas E. Watson	James Flannigan	726
People's Party	Thomas E. Watson	C. S. Conant	722
People's Party	Thomas E. Watson	E. E. T. Hazen	722
People's Party	Thomas E. Watson	Thomas Surber	712
Socialist Labor Party	Charles H. Corregan	Dr. H. S. Aley	335
Socialist Labor Party	Charles H. Corregan	Mrs. Minnie Mace	328
Socialist Labor Party	Charles H. Corregan	James D. Ryan	322
Socialist Labor Party	Charles H. Corregan	Adolph Zappe	312
Socialist Labor Party	Charles H. Corregan	Nixon Elliott	306
Votes cast (Note: Based on totals for highest elector on each ticket)			243,693

=== Results by county ===
County	Theodore Roosevelt Republican		Alton Brooks Parker Democratic		Eugene Victor Debs Socialist		Silas Comfort Swallow Prohibition		Various candidates Other parties		Margin	
County	%	#	%	#	%	#	%	#	%	#	%	#
Huerfano	73.69%	2,733	25.83%	958	0.38%	14	0.05%	2	0.05%	2	47.86%	1,775
Phillips	68.20%	444	21.51%	140	0.15%	1	6.14%	40	3.99%	26	46.70%	304
Sedgwick	69.82%	347	26.36%	131	0.00%	0	1.41%	7	2.41%	12	43.46%	216
Morgan	66.90%	1,136	23.91%	406	0.06%	1	6.01%	102	3.12%	53	42.99%	730
Lincoln	69.91%	323	28.57%	132	0.22%	1	1.08%	5	0.22%	1	41.34%	191
Washington	66.47%	460	27.60%	191	0.14%	1	3.03%	21	2.75%	19	38.87%	269
Kit Carson	66.67%	514	28.40%	219	2.59%	20	1.82%	14	0.52%	4	38.26%	295
Conejos	68.55%	2,018	30.60%	901	0.37%	11	0.24%	7	0.24%	7	37.94%	1,117
Prowers	64.20%	1,155	27.46%	494	5.06%	91	2.89%	52	0.39%	7	36.74%	661
Cheyenne	65.91%	145	31.36%	69	2.73%	6	0.00%	0	0.00%	0	34.55%	76
Yuma	63.50%	1,110	30.03%	525	2.57%	45	1.03%	18	2.86%	50	33.47%	585
Rio Grande	64.97%	1,417	31.64%	690	1.79%	39	0.69%	15	0.92%	20	33.33%	727
Larimer	62.64%	4,138	31.34%	2,070	1.20%	79	4.50%	297	0.33%	22	31.30%	2,068
Bent	63.94%	812	32.76%	416	1.02%	13	1.65%	21	0.63%	8	31.18%	396
Archuleta	63.71%	674	33.74%	357	0.66%	7	0.95%	10	0.95%	10	29.96%	317
Arapahoe	62.93%	1,351	33.40%	717	1.96%	42	1.58%	34	0.14%	3	29.53%	634
Weld	62.12%	4,833	32.84%	2,555	0.77%	60	3.91%	304	0.36%	28	29.28%	2,278
Costilla	63.46%	917	35.02%	506	0.90%	13	0.42%	6	0.21%	3	28.44%	411
El Paso	62.07%	9,589	34.18%	5,281	1.55%	240	1.91%	295	0.28%	44	27.89%	4,308
Grand	63.16%	475	35.37%	266	1.06%	8	0.00%	0	0.40%	3	27.79%	209
Mesa	58.45%	2,783	32.66%	1,555	4.18%	199	2.27%	108	2.44%	116	25.79%	1,228
San Miguel	61.16%	1,370	35.58%	797	2.63%	59	0.36%	8	0.27%	6	25.58%	573
Jefferson	60.76%	2,903	36.40%	1,739	1.55%	74	1.19%	57	0.10%	5	24.36%	1,164
Logan	57.13%	821	33.82%	486	1.18%	17	5.92%	85	1.95%	28	23.31%	335
Routt	60.54%	1,384	37.45%	856	0.83%	19	0.74%	17	0.44%	10	23.10%	528
Elbert	59.40%	768	37.28%	482	2.17%	28	0.93%	12	0.23%	3	22.12%	286
Baca	60.60%	203	38.81%	130	0.00%	0	0.30%	1	0.30%	1	21.79%	73
Douglas	59.28%	792	39.22%	524	0.60%	8	0.52%	7	0.37%	5	20.06%	268
Kiowa	56.60%	180	38.99%	124	2.20%	7	1.26%	4	0.94%	3	17.61%	56
Rio Blanco	58.11%	552	41.16%	391	0.21%	2	0.32%	3	0.21%	2	16.95%	161
Delta	50.65%	1,567	33.81%	1,046	11.93%	369	2.84%	88	0.78%	24	16.84%	521
Montrose	51.56%	1,306	36.40%	922	8.69%	220	2.45%	62	0.91%	23	15.16%	384
Clear Creek	56.22%	1,691	41.62%	1,252	0.43%	13	0.80%	24	0.93%	28	14.59%	439
Boulder	53.90%	5,483	39.62%	4,030	1.33%	135	4.81%	489	0.34%	35	14.28%	1,453
Saguache	56.19%	922	42.47%	697	0.91%	15	0.06%	1	0.37%	6	13.71%	225
Otero	53.98%	2,975	40.37%	2,225	3.05%	168	2.10%	116	0.49%	27	13.61%	750
Pueblo	55.72%	9,173	42.31%	6,966	0.69%	114	0.93%	153	0.35%	57	13.41%	2,207
Eagle	54.30%	802	42.32%	625	2.23%	33	0.27%	4	0.88%	13	11.98%	177
Teller	55.51%	5,595	43.63%	4,398	0.62%	62	0.19%	19	0.06%	6	11.88%	1,197
Garfield	53.09%	1,639	41.66%	1,286	3.92%	121	0.97%	30	0.36%	11	11.44%	353
La Plata	51.13%	1,745	42.72%	1,458	5.16%	176	0.56%	19	0.44%	15	8.41%	287
Las Animas	52.97%	5,218	45.54%	4,486	0.95%	94	0.44%	43	0.09%	9	7.43%	732
Fremont	51.69%	3,533	44.73%	3,057	0.78%	53	2.19%	150	0.61%	42	6.96%	476
Denver	51.73%	32,667	45.85%	28,958	1.33%	838	0.75%	476	0.34%	214	5.87%	3,709
Adams	50.89%	1,115	47.51%	1,041	0.64%	14	0.96%	21	0.00%	0	3.38%	74
Gunnison	49.67%	1,348	46.43%	1,260	2.84%	77	0.77%	21	0.29%	8	3.24%	88
Gilpin	49.01%	1,311	47.10%	1,260	1.35%	36	2.13%	57	0.41%	11	1.91%	51
Lake	50.07%	3,026	48.59%	2,936	0.79%	48	0.28%	17	0.26%	16	1.49%	90
Park	49.25%	685	48.09%	669	2.44%	34	0.00%	0	0.22%	3	1.15%	16
Hinsdale	47.55%	243	46.77%	239	4.50%	23	0.78%	4	0.39%	2	0.78%	4
Chaffee	46.90%	1,611	46.61%	1,601	4.86%	167	1.31%	45	0.32%	11	0.29%	10
Summit	48.15%	561	48.84%	569	2.49%	29	0.34%	4	0.17%	2	-0.69%	-8
Custer	48.63%	587	50.70%	612	0.50%	6	0.00%	0	0.17%	2	-2.07%	-25
Montezuma	45.66%	526	48.87%	563	3.56%	41	0.52%	6	1.39%	16	-3.21%	-37
Dolores	44.78%	150	49.85%	167	4.18%	14	0.00%	0	1.19%	4	-5.07%	-17
Ouray	44.04%	916	51.92%	1,080	3.41%	71	0.34%	7	0.29%	6	-7.88%	-164
Pitkin	40.21%	922	48.84%	1,120	7.37%	169	1.05%	24	2.53%	58	-8.63%	-198
San Juan	42.88%	708	54.45%	899	2.24%	37	0.24%	4	0.18%	3	-11.57%	-191
Mineral	33.59%	306	63.12%	575	2.41%	22	0.22%	2	0.66%	6	-29.53%	-269
