= Mark Houston =

American composer and writer

Mark Houston (December 5, 1946 – February 28, 1995) was an American composer, lyricist, playwright, actor, and newspaper columnist. Born in Texas and educated in Oklahoma, he began his career as an actor with the Creede Repertory Theatre in Colorado. While he was predominantly active with theatre companies in Kansas City, Missouri, he worked nationally as a director, composer, writer, and actor. He was best known for the musical Six Women with Brain Death or Expiring Minds Want to Know for which he served as both composer and lyricist. He also composed the opera Hazel Kirke which was commissioned by Lake George Opera (now Saratoga Opera). In his later career he wrote the political and cultural commentary column "Is It Just Me? " for the Oklahoma Gazette.

== Early life, education, and war service ==
Mark Houston was born on December 5, 1946 in Jacksonville, Texas. His father worked in the petroleum industry. He was one of five children born to Dan and Polly Houston. He spent his childhood living in East Texas. He moved with his family to Oklahoma at the age of fourteen and graduated from Bartlesville High School. As an undergraduate student he was a political science major at the University of Oklahoma (OU), and he earned his bachelor's degree there in 1969 at which time he was awarded the Letzeiser gold medal by OU.

In 1969 Houston was conscripted in the Vietnam War draft. He served just over eighteen months in the United States Army; beginning his service date on February 25, 1970 and being discharged on September 10, 1971. In a 1989 interview, Houston described his war experience as "the darkest time in my life."

After the war, Houston moved to Los Angeles in a failed attempt to break into a career as a songwriter. He returned to Oklahoma to pursue graduate studies in theater at OU; earning a Masters in Fine Arts degree in 1976. He performed in several plays at OU while a graduate student; including the parts of Cardinal Richelieu in The Three Musketeers (1974) Conjur Man in Howard Richardson and William Berney's Dark of the Moon (1974), Rosencrantz in Rosencrantz and Guildenstern Are Dead (1974), Sir Andrew in Twelfth Night (1975; also composed music), and the twins in Ring Round the Moon (1975).

In 1975 OU staged a musical he co-authored with Kathy Rubbo and Chris Thompson, The Wizard of Id, based on the comic strip of the same name. The three had previously collaborated on writing skits and crafting revues while undergraduate students at OU. It was reported in the press that work was likely the first created by students to be performed at OU's Rupel Jones Theatre.

== Career in theatre ==
Houston began his career at the Creede Repertory Theatre (CRT) as an actor in 1976. Plays he appeared in during his first season with that company included Two for the Seesaw, The Little Foxes, Lucille Fletcher's Night Watch, and Charley's Aunt. That same season he composed the score to the children's theatre musical Reggie and the Riddle of the Differcus which was premiered by the CRT. He also was the lyricist for most of that work; with the exception of a few songs by lyricist Jeff Tamblyn. It received a second professional staging in 1977 at the Oklahoma Theater Center (later Stage Center, demolished 2014).

In his second season at CRT in 1977, Houston directed the company's production of You're a Good Man, Charlie Brown. In 1978 he joined the staff of the Oklahoma Theater Center as the music director for their musicals and their theatre workshop program for teenagers. He also worked as a composer of "jingles" for local advertisements on radio and television.

In 1982 Houston moved to Kansas City, Missouri. There his second work for children, Harbledown!, was staged at The Coterie Theatre in June 1983. This work had previously premiered at the CRT in September 1982. Described as an "operatic fable", Harbledown!, used a libretto by Dianne Sposito and a score by Houston. It was expanded from a one hour long one-act children's opera into a two hour two-act long work for a production at the University of Missouri–Kansas City in 1984. The Coterie later staged his children's musicals Tommyknockers (1985, book by Richard Baxter and Eric Engdahl) The World of Pooh (1985), and Slapstick (1987, originally titled Commedia Paradia at its 1979 premiere).

Houston worked as both a music and stage director in Kansas City. He was music director of the Theatre League's 1984 production of I'm Getting My Act Together and Taking It on the Road with a cast led by Heather MacRae. That same year he was music director for The Coterie Theatre's production of Rotten Apples. He served as chorus master for the Lyric Opera of Kansas City's 1985 production of Candide, and directed the Missouri Repertory Theatre's (MRT) 1985 production of Side by Side by Sondheim. He also acted in this latter show which the MRT took on tour. Other professional productions he served as music director for in Kansas City included Baby (1986, 39th St Theatre), Little Shop of Horrors (1986, the Star Theatre), and stagings of many of his own shows.

Houston composed the music for the MRT's 1985 production of A Christmas Carol; a production in which he also acted the part of Charles Dickens. He later composed the music for The Curious Adventures of Alice; MRT's 1987 adaption of Alice in Wonderland.

On May 1, 1986 his musical Six Women with Brain Death or Expiring Minds Want to Know premiered in a preview run at the Unicorn Theatre in Kansas City; a satirical musical revue that pulled its source material from outrageous tabloid headlines in the National Enquirer. It later officially opened on November 28, 1986 at the same theatre. The work became Houston's most well known piece and had ten different professional stagings during his lifetime. These included lengthy runs of the show that lasted over a year and a half in the cities of San Diego and Scottsdale, Arizona. It was also the subject of a radio piece made by NPR.

On August 7, 1987 the Lake George Opera premiered his opera Hazel Kirke based on the 1880 play of the same name by Steele MacKaye. It was conducted by Hal France, and starred Karen Hunt in the title role, Victoria Livengood as Hazel's mother, Harlan Foss as Dunstan Kirke, David Eisler as Arthur, George Massey as Hazel's intended, and Rosalind Elias as Arthur's mother. The opera was staged by Francis Cullinan.

In September 1992 Houston's country blues inflected musical Changin' Lanes premiered at the Unicorn Theatre in Kansas City. He also wrote the musical Heaven in Your Pocket which was staged at the New York Musical Theatre Festival in 2008.

== Later life and death ==
In 1989 Houston moved from Kansas City to Oklahoma City in order to be near his family. In his later life he worked as a columnist for the Oklahoma Gazette; penning the witty political and cultural column "Is It Just Me? A gay man, he lived his longtime partner James LaFever.

Houston died of complications from AIDS at his home in Oklahoma City on February 28, 1995. His funeral was held at St. Eugene's Catholic Church in Oklahoma City.
