= Francis Cullinan =

American stage director

Francis Cullinan is an American stage director of opera, musical theater, dramas, comedies and cabaret shows.

== Life and career ==
Born in Massachusetts, Cullinan received his BA from St. Bonaventure University and an MA degree in Speech and Theatre from the University of Kansas. He also served for five years as a Special Services Entertainment Director for the US Army in Zweibrücken, Germany where he ran the Zweibrücken American Theatre and helped coordinate touring USO shows. He went on to serve as Associate Professor of Theatre at the University of Missouri-Kansas City where he was the principal coordinator for the MFA professional directing program and supervisor of the studio theatre series. He became a full-time faculty member at the school in 1974, directing regularly there until he retired in 1989.

Among the 37 operas directed by Cullinan are Don Pasquale for Anchorage Opera in 1986, the 1987 world-premiere of Mark Houston's Hazel Kirke at Lake George Opera, a 1992 production of The Merry Widow for Opera Festival of New Jersey, La bohème for Utah Opera in 1995, Falstaff for Opera Carolina in 1997, The Barber of Seville for Central City Opera and Roméo et Juliette for Kentucky Opera in 1998, Candide for Pittsburgh Opera Theatre in 1999, and Hansel and Gretel for Manitoba Opera in 2000. In September 1995 he directed Kurt Weill's opera Down in the Valley for Lyric Opera of Kansas City. Conducted by Russell Patterson, this was the first production of the work by a professional American opera company.

Cullinan's work with Lyric Opera of Kansas City, which began in 1980, also included La fille du régiment, Così fan tutte, The Barber of Seville, Andrea Chénier, L'elisir d'amore and Don Giovanni in addition to several Gilbert and Sullivan operas. In addition to returning to many of these companies for further productions he also directed operas for Chattanooga Symphony and Opera, Mobile Opera, Toledo Opera, Opera Omaha, Augusta Opera and Piedmont Opera. As a guest stage director and Visiting Artist, Cullinan has also staged various works at the Carnegie Mellon College of Fine Arts and the Opera Institute at Boston University.

Cullinan has worked as theatre director for plays staged at the Eisenhower Theatre in Washington, D.C., Boston's Huntington Theatre, the Missouri Repertory Theatre and The Perry Street Theatre in New York City, where he directed Simply Cole Porter in 1994. In 1983 he directed a successful production of Oscar Wilde's The Importance of Being Earnest for the Boston Shakespeare Company. A past Artistic Director for the Creede Repertory Theatre, he was also a guest stage director for the company.

While largely retired, in recent years he has directed plays and cabaret shows for The Arts Council of Henderson County, North Carolina. In 2011, he created and directed On the Sunny Side of the Street, an original cabaret revue in tribute to the lyricist and librettist, Dorothy Fields, with musical direction by Jan Powell. In the same year, he directed the one man show, Shakespeare Sings! at the Altamont Theatre featuring Shakespearean monologues with operatic arias and art song settings of Shakespeare's work performed by tenor Scott Joiner. In 2013 he directed a semi-staged performance of Jake Heggie's Dead Man Walking starring Jane Bunnell, Elise Quagliata as Sister Helen and Christiaan Smith-Kotlarek as the condemned man. It was produced by the American Music Project and performed at the University of North Carolina at Asheville and attended by Helen Prejean.
