= Tatjana Radisic =

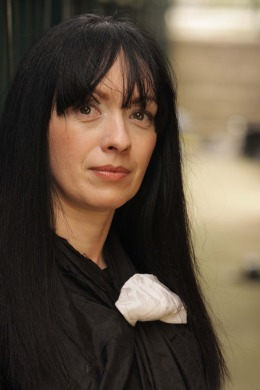

Background information
- Born: Tatjana Radisic; 1973 (age 52–53); Serbia
- Genres: Theater and Film
- Occupation: Costume
- Years active: 1996 – Present
- Website: https://tatjanaradisic.carbonmade.com/

Tatjana Radisic is a Serbian costume designer for theater and film. Her work has been seen on stages throughout the country and internationally on screen.

She holds a double BFA from Belgrade University in Fine and Applied Arts, and an MFA from Belgrade University in Costume Design. Ms. Radisic is Board of Directors member of ULUPUDS – Association of Applied Artists and Designers of Serbia. She is member of Supervisory Board at Film Center of Serbia. She is also a member of the United Scenic Artists Local USA 829, IATSE, "Costume Society of America", USITT (Association of design, production and technology professionals in the entertainment industry), OISTAT "International Organization of Scenographers", "Theatre Architects and Technicians" and The Applied Artists and Designers Association of Serbia" as Independent Artist.

== Theaters ==
Ms. Radisic's work has been seen in USA, Serbia, Croatia, Slovenia, Ireland, Germany, Romania, and Tasmania-Australia. Her work includes groundbreaking experiments in costuming in her collaborations with Timișoara National Theatre, the Croatian National Theatre Rijeka, Chicago Museum of Contemporary Art, Atelje 212, Terazije Theatre, Belgrade Drama Theatre, Steppenwolf Theatre, the Goodman Theatre, Court Theatre (Chicago), Writers Theatre, Redmoon Theater, Drury Lane Theatre (Illinois), Blair Thomas and Co., 500 Clown, Hedwig Dances, Victory Gardens Theater, Northlight Theatre, Live Bait Theatre, American Theater Company, UMA Productions, Apple Tree Theatre, Notre Dame Shakespeare Festival, Creede Repertory Theatre Company, among others.

== Films ==
Radisic's film work includes the costume designs for Top je bio vreo, Eastalgia, Kad bude-bice, Nova, Gray In White And Black And Up On The Rope.

== TV Series ==
Klan

== Awards ==
Radisic has received numerous awards and recognitions including:

- 2025 Annual award of the association of fine artists of applied arts and designers of Serbia for creative work in 2023
- 2023 Award for costume design at the 59th Festival of Professional theatres of Serbia "Joakim Vujic"
- 2019 Sterija award for Best Costume Design at 64th Sterijino Pozorje Festival, Novi Sad, Serbia
- 2019 Award for Best Costume Design at 1st Festival of Balkan drama and theatre "Theatre at the crossroads", Nis, Serbia
- 2018 Award for Best Costume Design at 23rd Yugoslav Theater Festival, Uzice, Serbia
- 2018 The Great Prize of Serbia for Applied Art and Design for 2016
- 2017 Terazije Theatre – Annual Award for Costume Design in musical "The Phantom of the Opera"
- 2017 Award for Best Costume Design at 67th Festival of Professional Theatres of Vojvodina
- Award for Best Set Design at 52nd Festival of Professional Theatres of Serbia "Joakim Vujic"
- 2016 Award for Best Costume Design at 66th Festival of Professional Theatres of Vojvodina
- 2015 Annual Award for Costume Design by Association of Applied Arts Artists and Designers of Serbia (ULUPUDS)
- Award for Best Costume Design at SOFEST|Sopot International Film Festival
- 2013 Association of Applied Arts Artists and Designers of Serbia (ULUPUDS) award for outstanding contributions to the art and culture of Serbia
- 2013 Best Costume Design at 'Comedy Days' Theatrical Festival in Jagodina
- 2013 Belgrade Drama Theatre Award for Artistic Contribution
- 2008, 2009 and 2010Joseph Jefferson Award Nominations for Best Costume Design
- 2006 Best Costumes in for "The Duches of Malfi" at Writers Theatre by Sun-Times News Group
- 2005 Changing Worlds Award Nominations for Arts
- 2000 Award for Best Costume Design at Festival of Professional Theatres of Vojvodina
- 1999 First prize of Association of Applied Arts Artists of Serbia at exhibition "Diploma 1999"
- Tatjana was named one of the Fifty Leading Players In Chicago Theatre by New City Magazine and has been featured in Chicago Tribune, Chicago Sun-Times, PerformInk and on many TV appearances and radio broadcasts
