= Wason, Colorado =

Extinct settlement in the United States

Wason
- Extinct settlement
- Location within Colorado
- Coordinates: 37°50′13″N 106°53′30″W
- Country: United States
- State: Colorado
- County: Mineral
- Nearest town: Creede

Wason, Colorado, also spelled Wasson, became the county seat of Mineral County, Colorado, when the state legislature established it on March 27, 1893. Disagreeing with their decision, the Town Council voted Creede as the county seat in November 1893. To solidify the matter, a group of town residents went to Wason in the night. They dismantled the courthouse and took it with the county records to Creede. The Wason town was located on Colorado State Highway 149, 2.3 miles (3.7 km) southeast of Creede and 6 miles (9.7 km) north of Wagon Wheel Gap.

Martin Van Buren (M.V.B.)'s ranch, the first in the area, built in 1871, was the basis for the town of Wason. He platted 80 acres and built a courthouse for the town near the Rio Grande River. M.V.B. Wason established a toll road through the property. The high prices angered the travelers and the state bought the right-of-way through the property after a while.

Wason was previously in Rio Grande County. The town site is now Wason Ranch.
