= Down in the Valley (opera) =

- folk-opera by Kurt Weill
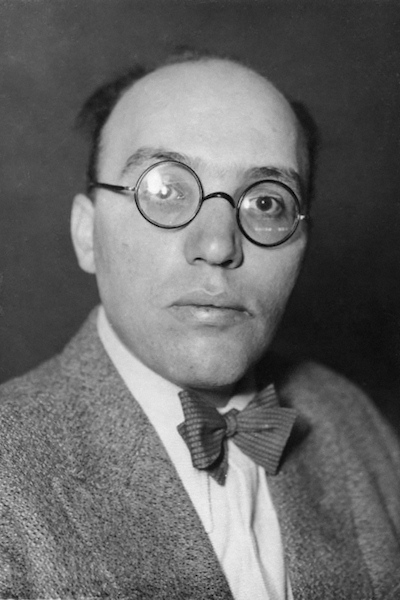
- The composer in 1932
- Librettist: Arnold Sundgaard
- Language: English
- Premiere: 15 July 1948; Bloomington, Indiana University

Down in the Valley is a folk-opera in one act by composer Kurt Weill and librettist Arnold Sundgaard, initially composed and conceived for the radio in 1945 then rewritten and produced in 1948. It uses famous American tunes to carry the story (including "Down in the Valley", "The Lonesome Dove", and "Hop Up, My Ladies") and connected by original choral music.

== Performance history ==
This short opera, originally running only about 20 minutes, was conceived as the first of a series of radio operas by Olin Downes, the music critic of The New York Times, and Charles McArthur, a businessman. The radio idea eventually fell through for lack of a sponsor, although Maurice Abravanel conducted an audition recording that was never broadcast. Hans Heinsheimer, the director of publications at Schirmer, approached Weill with a request for a school opera like Der Jasager for production by the opera department of Indiana University School of Music. Weill expanded and simplified Down in the Valley to a 40-minute version, and the revised version had its world premiere at that university in Bloomington, Indiana in 1948, directed by Hans Busch (son of Fritz Busch) and conducted by Ernst Hoffmann. Alan Jay Lerner's second wife, Marion Bell, played Jennie. The piece was soon broadcast on NBC radio. In 1950, it was broadcast on NBC television. It was subsequently produced in July 1952 in Provincetown, New York at the Provincetown Playhouse, directed by Tony Randall.

In 1960, the piece was played in German at the Staatstheater Hannover, directed by Hartmut Goebel and conducted by Walter Born, with Die sieben Todsünden. In 1984, PBS Television broadcast the piece, directed by Frank Cvitanovich and conducted by Carl Davis. It was filmed in England by the Moving Picture Company. In September 1995, it was presented in Kansas City at the Lyric Opera, directed by Francis Cullinan and conducted by Russell Patterson. The work has also been performed numerous times by amateur forces. It has received a number of recordings.

== Synopsis ==
The action begins in a jail the night before an execution and is told in flashback form.

Brack Weaver, a teenager, falls in love with a girl, Jennie, after an Appalachian prayer meeting, but her father wants her to go to a dance with his shyster creditor, Thomas Bouché, who the father thinks will bail him out of his money troubles. Jennie disobeys and goes to the dance with Brack.

At the dance, the villain gets drunk and threatens the hero with a knife. The two fight, the villain dies (by his own weapon), and Brack is condemned to be hanged. On the night before his execution, he escapes to spend his last hours with Jennie, before turning himself in to meet his fate.

== Roles ==
- Brack Weaver (a young suitor) – tenor
- Jennie (his girlfriend) – soprano
- Thomas Bouché (a businessman; Jennie's older suitor) – bass-baritone
- Leader/Preacher – baritone
- Jennie's Father – spoken
- Jailer – spoken
- Townspeople – Chorus

== Musical numbers ==
- Down in the Valley
- Where Is the One Who Will Mourn Me When I'm Gone?
- Brack Weaver, My True Love
- The Lonesome Dove
- The Little Black Train
- Hop Up, My Ladies
- Hoe-Down
- Down in the Valley (reprise)
