= Opera Saratoga =

Opera company in Saratoga Springs, New York, United States

Opera Saratoga (until January 2011, named the Lake George Opera) is a professional opera company based in Saratoga Springs, New York. It performs an annual summer festival of three fully staged operas and operettas.

The company and its associated Lake George Opera Festival were founded in 1962 by Fred Patrick, a New York–based singer/actor and Juilliard graduate, and the husband of Jeanette Scovotti, a soprano who sang at the Metropolitan Opera. Early performances took place at Diamond Point on the shores of Lake George in upstate New York and later moved to the nearby town of Queensbury. John Balme was the General Director from 1988 to 1992. Since 1998, Lake George Opera's performance base has been the Spa Little Theater at the Saratoga Performing Arts Center. Conductor John Douglas served as the company's chorusmaster and director of the LGO's young artist program from 2002 until his death in 2010. On July 1, 2014, Lawrence Edelson became the ninth General and artistic director. In March 2023, Mary Birnbaum became the 10th General and artistic director.

Several well-known opera singers performed with the company early in their careers, including Catherine Malfitano, Diana Soviero, Eric Halfvarson and Jerry Hadley.

The company celebrated its 50th anniversary in 2011.

== World premieres ==
World premiere productions staged by the company include:

- David Amram's Twelfth Night, based on Shakespeare's Twelfth Night (1968)
- Robert Baksa's Aria da Capo (1968)
- José Bernardo's The Child, based on José Martí's poem La Niña de Guatemala (1974)
- Alva Henderson's The Last of the Mohicans based on James Fenimore Cooper's novel, The Last of the Mohicans (1977)
- Glenn Paxton's The Adventures of Friar Tuck (1983)
- Mark Houston's Hazel Kirke (1987), based on Steele MacKaye's 1879 play
