= Nicholas C. Creede =

American prospector

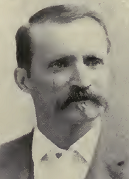
- Born: William Harvey c. 1843; Fort Wayne, Indiana, US
- Died: July 12, 1897; Los Angeles, California, US
- Occupation: Prospector
- Years active: 1862–1893

Nicholas C. Creede (c. 1843 – July 12, 1897) was an American prospector famous for discovering the Holy Moses Amethyst vein and other mining properties near Creede, Colorado in the late 1880s and early 1890s.

== Early life ==
Nicholas C. Creede was born William Harvey about 1843 near Fort Wayne, Indiana. At the age of two, the family moved to what would later become Jasper County in Iowa Territory. There, the family took up farming. Siblings included older brothers McConnell, Jerome L. who later became a postmaster, and John W. who later became a judge. He also had at least one sister, Clara.

=== Army life ===
In his teens, Creede worked in the U.S. Army Quartermaster's Department but grew weary of the routine work. In 1862, at the age of 19, he volunteered with the United States Army and served seven years as a scout with the Pawnee in campaigns against the Sioux. During this time, he received the pay of a first lieutenant although he held no rank. As part of these duties, he traveled in Nebraska, Colorado, Wyoming, Montana and the Badlands of the Dakotas. He was present in the Black Hills when gold was discovered there, which led to his interest in prospecting.

=== Name change ===
In 1870, Creede left the army and returned to Iowa intending to woo and wed a local girl who had caught his eye before he began his travels as a scout. Upon his return, though, he found that she had wed Creede's brother, with whom she had had a child. Although the family eventually reconciled some years later, this event so agitated young Billy Harvey that he changed his name to Nicholas "Nic" C. Creede. The event also strengthened his resolve to become a prospector.

== Life as a prospector, discovery of the Creede mines ==
For the next 20 years, Creede drifted up and down the Rocky Mountains. Occasionally he would strike it rich enough to sell out and obtain a year's grubstake, but more often he was broke and forced to work at whatever he could to get enough money to resume prospecting. He usually traveled with one or more partners.

=== Monarch and Bonanza strikes ===
Creede's first significant strike was in 1878 in Chaffee County, Colorado, when he discovered the Monarch located near present-day Monarch Pass. As was common during that time as most prospectors rarely had the capital, the knowledge and/or the will to develop the strike themselves, he sold the Monarch for a small sum. He then struck a vein he called the Bonanza which he sold for US$20,000 (~$454,500 US 2011). Creede used this money to tour the mining districts and learn more about mining, minerals and prospecting.

=== Mammoth and Ethel strikes ===
Creede's next major discovery was the Mammoth mine on Campbell Mountain, Colorado in May 1890. Although the Mammoth had some very rich ore, it was not considered a big strike. Creede discovered the Ethel mine associated with the same vein a month later. Once developed, the Ethel shipped a little ore, but it was of a comparatively low grade.

=== Holy Moses and Amethyst strikes ===
In June 1891, Creede discovered his biggest strike to date, the Holy Moses, near what was known at the time as the Jimtown camp. This strike was rich enough to attract the attention of David H. Moffat of Denver, who, along with Moffat's colleagues, leased the Holy Moses from Creede.

Convinced of Creede's prospecting skill, the Moffat-led consortium reached a further agreement with Creede to continue his prospecting activities while the consortium developed the Holy Moses into a producing mine. In addition to a US$100 per month stipend ($2,500 US 2011), Creede was to receive a one-third share of all future finds.

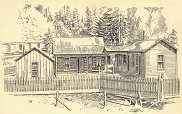
Creede cottage in Creede, Colorado

This arrangement proved extremely lucrative for Creede when, shortly after discovering the Holy Moses, Creede located the rich Amethyst vein on a claim that had been abandoned by miner "Dutch" Fritz. The mines subsequently developed on the Amethyst vein included the Bachelor, the Annie Rooney, the Sunnyside, and the Commodore. Creede's share of the Amethyst mining operation was well over a million dollars, with some sources placing his daily income from the Amethyst and related properties at US$1,000 ($27,000 US 2011) per day in 1892. Shortly after discovery of the Amethyst vein, the name of the Jimtown camp was changed to Creede in honor of the find.

Upon interviewing Creede in March 1892 after discovery of the Amethyst, Scientific American described him as reserved, modest, unassuming, taciturn, pure-minded, courageous and generous to a fault, but with a commanding air of a person whose few words were characterized by "great good sense". He was also said not to "know the taste of whisky" or "to know nought of gambling".

== Life after the Amethyst strike ==
=== Marriage ===
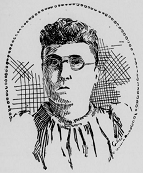
Mrs. Creede c. 1898

During his time prospecting near the Jimtown camp, Creede met Nancy Louisa Kyles (née White) of Birmingham, Alabama. Mrs. Kyles ran a boarding house in Del Norte, Colorado, and had already had three husbands before she met Creede. She was also as familiar with the hardships of frontier and mining camp life as Creede himself.

When Creede struck it rich, he built a "neat but plain" log cabin at Creede, and Mrs. Kyles served as his housekeeper while she obtained a divorce from her current husband. She also was said to have often accompanied Creede, and his young nephew Sherman Phifer, on many of Creede's prospecting journeys. They married in Las Vegas, New Mexico on May 25, 1893 and purchased a small cottage for $5,000 in Pueblo, Colorado where Creede's tastes were "simple and his habit economical". In due course, the Creedes bought a lavish residence in Los Angeles and relocated permanently from Colorado to California, where they lived a life of comfort and ease.

=== Blackmail attempt ===
In 1893, Creede received anonymous letters which accused him of having murdered a man who once held a mortgage on his father's farm in Iowa. One of his accusers was said to be the son of Creede's half brother. Creede did not believe an uncle-nephew relationship existed and believed the accusation was a blackmail attempt. The accusing "nephew" was later found dead, an apparent suicide, in a Pullman sleeping car in Wilson, Kansas in February 1894.

=== Adoption of Edith Dorothy Walker ===
In August 1895, the childless Creedes adopted six-month-old Edith Dorothy Hitt Walker. Young Dorothy's history was equal in color and drama to either of the Creedes.

Dorothy was the daughter of Edith Waters Walker. Edith claimed to have been born in San Francisco in 1875 in poverty, hardship and neglect. However, young Edith was removed from poverty when she was adopted by a Mrs. Scott, the widow of a wealthy warehouse owner. Mrs. Scott then married William G. Waters, the foreman of the printing department of a San Francisco daily newspaper. When Mrs. Waters (Scott) became ill, the family moved to southern California for her health. There, "Captain" Waters acquired possession of San Miguel Island and established a home there.

Mrs. Waters died during Edith's youth, leaving Edith on the island with only a housekeeper and hired men for company since Captain Waters was often on the mainland. This lonely existence apparently did not suit Edith, who wished to pursue a career as an actress. So, when a sailboat landed on the island, Edith persuaded the captain of the vessel to take her to the mainland.

Dorothy's father, John Mackay Walters, had his own colorful and dramatic history as the relatively impoverished son of well-to-do California businessman J. B. Walker, who was a partner of "Bonanza King" John William Mackay. Shortly after reaching the mainland, Edith met John Walters. Two weeks later, she performed her first role on stage under the stage name Ynez (Inez) Dean. Four weeks later, Edith and John Walters were wed.

The Walters marriage was stormy and short-lived with Edith Walters leaving the marriage to pursue her acting career. Edith later entered the Los Angeles County Infirmary as a charity inmate. In the early spring of 1895, she gave birth to Dorothy. For nine months, the young mother tried to support them with her acting career. In the summer, she filed suit against her husband seeking divorce, and suit against her step-father to reclaim the inheritance she said was due her from her adopted mother Mrs. Scott. These legal actions garnered the attention of the press as well as Mr. Creede. Creede, moved by the accounts of the young lady's hardships, offered to adopt young Dorothy. The adoption was completed in late summer. According to some reports, Edith wished to give Dorothy a good home because of Edith was concerned that her ill health would soon leave Dorothy an orphan.

=== Dissolution of the Creede marriage ===
Mrs. Creede, who had begun taking morphine in 1876 after "having been kicked by a cow" and who was by now a heavy morphine user, was unwilling or unable to care for young Dorothy. So nurses were hired to care for the baby. In February 1896, Miss Maggie Kearny entered the household to serve as a nurse to Dorothy Creede. Although denied by Miss Kearny, Mrs. Creede alleged that in the summer of 1897 Creede began a liaison with Miss Kearny.

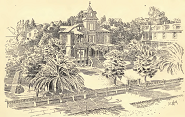
Creede residence in Los Angeles

In the winter of 1897-98, while Creede was out of town, Nancy Creede dismissed Miss Kearny and had her removed from the Creede's Los Angeles home. This infuriated Creede, who had previously promised to take steps to dissolve the marriage should Mrs. Creede take such an action. Following this incident, on January 4, 1897 Creede asked his wife to accept US$20,000 (~$540,500, US 2011) in cash, surrender all claims, leave their Los Angeles home and return to her home in Alabama. Creede and his attorney had prepared a document which Mrs. Creede signed in the presence of witnesses including a notary. It was understood that after the necessary waiting period, Creede would institute divorce proceedings. Miss Kearny returned to the Creede residence on January 14.

In the spring, Creede was said to have begun divorce proceedings on the ground of cruelty, alleging that she was addicted to the use of morphine. Mrs. Creede filed a cross complaint asking for half the property, and her attorney advised her to return to Los Angeles to pursue the case. She did so in June, engaging lodgings with her niece at the Clarendon Hotel. Creede was aware that his wife was in town and was said to have been distressed by her proximity, going so far as to have her monitored and her movements reported back to him. Although she did not meet personally with Creede, her niece visited the Creede residence and proposed, on her aunt's behalf, a reconciliation.

== Death ==
On the afternoon of July 12, 1897, Creede swallowed a large dose of morphine at his home in Los Angeles. Creede then went to the garden and reclined on a couch in the summer house. His gardener and confidant, F. L. Maas, noted an unusual feebleness in his movements and later noted that Creede's breathing was labored. He did not bring this to anyone's attention, however, until Creede's brother-in-law William M. Phifer, who was married to Creede's sister Clara, arrived at the home at about 6:30 pm. Mr. Phifer carried Creede into the house and summoned medical aid. Despite the medical intervention, Creede died some three hours later.

Although widely reported in the press as a suicide, Creede's friends noted that he was in the habit of using morphine in moderate quantities "to quiet the pain caused by neuralgia of the stomach" and assumed he had taken an overdose by mistake. A coroner's jury subsequently ruled the death "accidental self-poisoning by an overdose of morphine taken to relieve pain".

== Will and estate ==
Creede's will left the bulk of the estate to the adopted daughter Dorothy to be made available to her upon reaching age 25 "should she faithfully demean herself and grow to be a good, virtuous woman". The will also contained other, much smaller but nevertheless substantial bequests to his sister, his nephew Sherman Phifer, and his brothers. There were no provisions in the will for Mrs. Creede. His sister Clara's husband, William Phifer, was to serve as executor and as guardian to Dorothy. Creede's estate was subsequently appraised at a value of US$153,716 (~$4,155,000 in US 2011) with US$105,000 (~$2,838,000 in US 2011) in real and the remainder in personal property although this only represented Creede's California holdings. Some estimates placed the total Creede estate at upwards of US$3,000,000 (~$81,000,000 in US 2011).

=== Distribution of the estate ===
A spate of legal proceedings followed Creede's death, culminating in a highly publicized trial which decided the distribution of the estate. The primary issues at this trial, held in early 1898 in Los Angeles, were:

- Was Mrs. Creede the legal wife of Mr. Creede,
- Was the deed of separation in effect at the time of Creede's death a valid instrument, and
- Was the will a forgery.

==== Legitimacy of the Creede marriage ====
Nancy White (later Mrs. Nancy Creede) eloped with her first husband, George S. Vandever, in about 1858 when she was a girl of roughly 13 to 16 years of age. They eventually settled in Kentucky where Mr. Vandever enlisted in the army and served in the Civil War. She later learned that her husband had been stabbed, and had died from his wounds. In 1868, she married Jerome Davis in Cape Girardeau, Missouri although he died a short time later in St. Louis, Missouri. In 1886, she married Frank Kyles in Colorado, whom she divorced before marrying Creede. George Vandever, however, was not dead. Rather, he was still very much alive at the time of her marriage to Creede, thus potentially rendering Nancy Kyle's marriage to Creede invalid. According to some sources, she was aware of this potential when she accepted the $20,000 separation settlement in January.

Unknown to Mrs. Creede, however, Vandever had obtained a divorce prior to her marriage to Creede. After he was released from the army, he returned home to find that his wife had disappeared—it being said that she had taken up with another man. According to Vandever, she entered a house of prostitution at Paducah, Kentucky and so, in October 1865, Vandever applied for a divorce on the grounds of adultery rather than simple desertion. The divorce decree was granted in April 1866. So although Mrs. Creede had not sought a divorce from Vandever before marrying Creede, Vandever had obtained a divorce before Nancy Vandever's marriage to Creede.

During the legal proceedings, evidence came to light that Mr. Mark L. White, who was married to Mrs. Creede's sister Elvira, solicited bribes from the attorneys of various claimants either to bring Mr. Vandever forward or, alternately, to keep him from testifying. White also asserted that he had been negotiating with Creede prior to Creede's death to furnish evidence that Mrs. Creede had never obtained a divorce from Vandever. White also claimed that Vandever was in partnership with White in White's blackmailing schemes (although many sources thought this was unlikely, given Mr. Vandever's good character).

==== Legitimacy of the deed of separation ====
Mrs. Creede claimed that the deed of separation was invalid as she was coerced and bullied, and was ill and was under the influence of morphine at the time of signing. Testimony associated with this issue confirmed that Mrs. Creede was a heavy morphine user. However, others involved with the events of January 4 testified that she was vigorous and appeared mentally alert on the day she signed the document of separation.

Mrs. Creede also claimed that, in addition to a husband-wife relationship, she and Creede were business partners and that she was entitled to some parts of the estate as a business partner. For example, she claimed that Creede had agreed to give her a percentage of all strikes made during their joint prospecting travels and further claimed to have been present when Creede discovered the Amethyst vein.

==== Legitimacy of the will ====
Mrs. Creede also asserted that Nicholas Creede's signature on the will was invalid and that "the name of N. C. Creede had first been stamped … with a glycerin stamp after which it had been written in ink, or rather, painted over with a pen".

==== Resolution of the case ====
A verdict was reached in August 1898 which determined that, given the divorce decree granted to George Vandever, Nancy Louise Creede was Nicholas C. Creede's true and lawful wife. However, the court also ruled that the deed of separation Mrs. Creede had signed in January 1897 was valid and applied not only to community property but any business partnerships (should any have existed). She was, therefore, not entitled to any portion of the estate other than the $20,000 she had previously received.

=== Guardianship of Dorothy Creede ===
Guardianship of Dorothy Creede was claimed by William Phifer as defined by the will, by Mrs. Creede, and by the child's mother Edith Waters Walder who had subsequently recovered from her illness, married a San Franciscan hardware dealer and was now known as Edith Bashford.

Regarding William Phifer's claim, concern was expressed that a man should have guardianship of such a young girl. Mr. Phifer died before the case was settled leaving claims for guardianship split among his son, Sherman Phifer, and three others. Regarding Mrs. Creede's claim, it was established that in legal terms, only Mr. Creede had adopted the little girl. The papers Mrs. Creede had signed at the time of adoption were simply agreements to the adoption by Mr. Creede. The court ultimately decided, in 1898, that Mrs. Bashford would be granted guardianship of Dorothy until she came of age. With that decision, Dorothy was relocated to Mrs. Bashford's home in San Francisco.

==== Dorothy Creede's later life and death ====
In 1901, young Miss Creede, under the guardianship of her mother, succeeded in overthrowing the restriction on inheritance at age 25 and received a substantial portion of the estate at that time. She graduated from Tamalpais High School in the Mill Valley area of Sausalito, California in 1914, married William Lloyd Ritchie and bore one daughter, Edith Romer Ritchie in the late summer of 1918. Mrs. Ritchie (Creede) died at the age of 23 in November 1918 at the St. Francis Hospital only a few months after the birth of her daughter when a case of bronchitis developed into the Spanish flu. The bulk of the Creede estate then passed to her daughter with the remainder passing to her mother Mrs. Bashford.

=== Related lawsuits ===
The legal wrangling associated with Creede's death did not end with the ruling on Dorothy Creede's guardianship. John T. Jones, as administrator of the estate on Miss Creede's behalf, filed suit in 1899 claiming that David H. Moffat and other members of the Moffat-led consortium conspired to induce Creede, who is said to have been mentally unbalanced, to give them his stock in the Amethyst Mining Company free of charge. The suit claimed that a one-third interest in the Amethyst mines was worth over US$5,000,000 (~$135,000,000 US 2011).
