= 1920 United States presidential election in Colorado =

- November 2, 1920
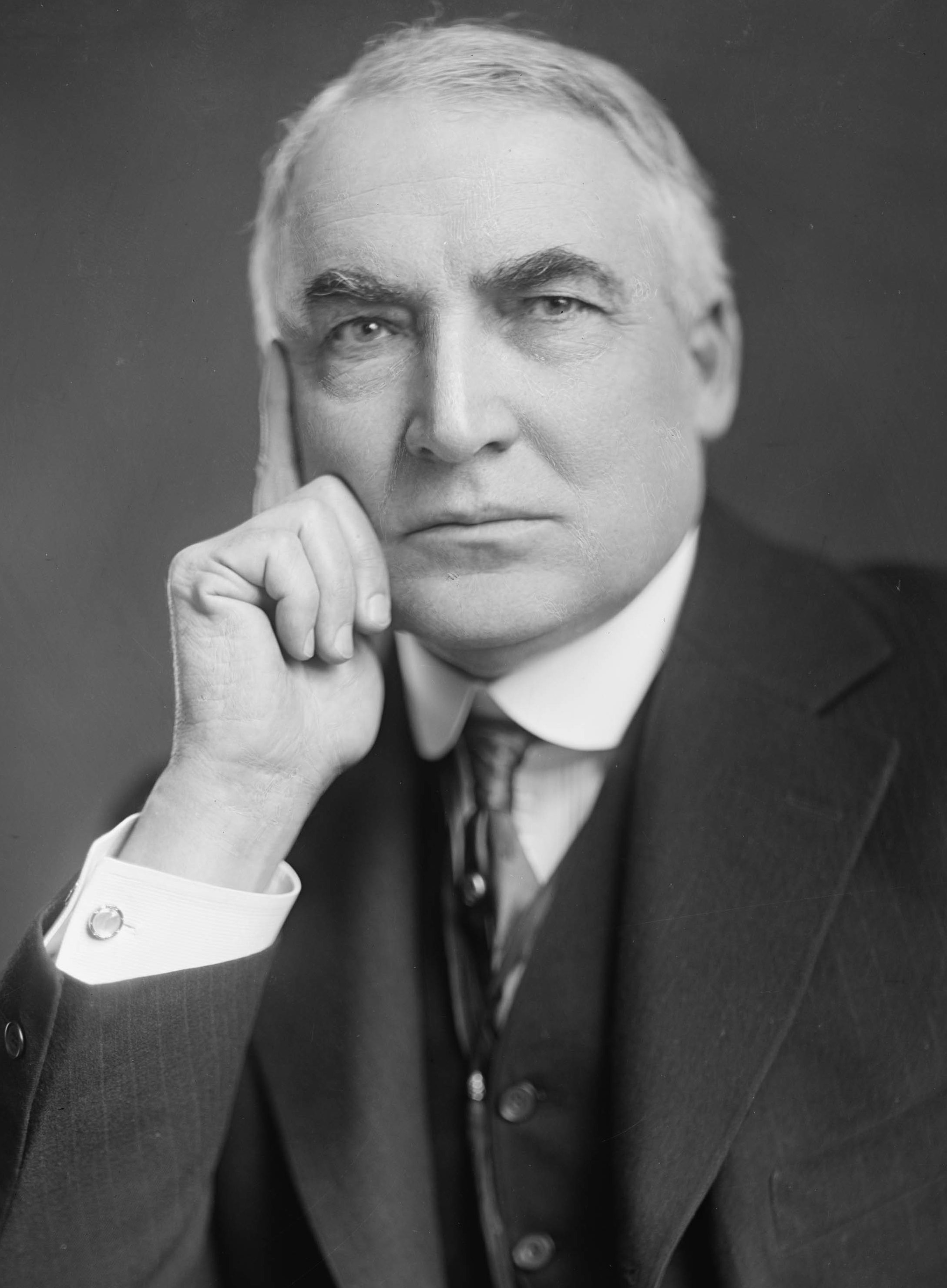

Nominee	Warren G. Harding	James M. Cox
Party	Republican	Democratic
Home state	Ohio	Ohio
Running mate	Calvin Coolidge	Franklin D. Roosevelt
Electoral vote	6	0
Popular vote	173,248	104,936
Percentage	59.32%	35.93%
County results
Harding
40–50%
50–60%
60–70%
70–80%
President before election
Woodrow Wilson
Democratic
Elected President
Warren G. Harding
Republican

The 1920 United States presidential election in Colorado was held on November 2, 1920, as part of the 1920 United States presidential election. State voters chose six electors to the Electoral College, who voted for president and vice president.

In 1916, Colorado was the most Democratic state outside of the “Solid South” as a result of historic Bryanite Populist support in silver-mining regions, and a powerful "peace vote" for incumbent President Woodrow Wilson; however, by the beginning of 1920 skyrocketing inflation and Wilson's focus upon his proposed League of Nations at the expense of domestic policy had helped make the incumbent president very unpopular – besides which Wilson also had major health problems that had left First Lady Edith effectively running the nation. Political unrest seen in the Palmer Raids and the "Red Scare" further added to the unpopularity of the Democratic Party, since this global political turmoil produced considerable fear of alien revolutionaries invading the country. Demand in the West for exclusion of Asian immigrants became even stronger than it had been before.

All these factors combined to produce a national landslide, with a swing of almost twenty-nine percentage points to the Republicans vis-à-vis of four years earlier. Colorado mirrored this trend, with a total swing of 49.38 points from Wilson's 26-point 1916 victory where he carried every county except Sedgwick. This time, Harding would not merely become only the second Republican victor in the state since James B. Weaver’s Populist victory transitioned the state into a Democratic-leaning one, but become the only presidential candidate in history to carry all Colorado’s counties. The state was still 2.84 points more Democratic than the nation at-large despite Harding’s historic county sweep.

== Results ==
General Election Results
Party	Pledged to	Elector	Votes
Republican Party	Warren G. Harding	Julie Penrose	173,248
Republican Party	Warren G. Harding	W. J. Frederick	172,574
Republican Party	Warren G. Harding	Frank D. Catlin	172,108
Republican Party	Warren G. Harding	Adella Bailey	171,709
Republican Party	Warren G. Harding	William Kincaid	171,102
Republican Party	Warren G. Harding	Anna Wolcott Vaile	167,766
Democratic Party	James M. Cox	W. D. Kelsey	104,936
Democratic Party	James M. Cox	Carrie St. Clair Napier	104,396
Democratic Party	James M. Cox	Thomas A. Duke	104,021
Democratic Party	James M. Cox	Frank L. Bishop	103,721
Democratic Party	James M. Cox	Charles H. Leckenby	102,899
Democratic Party	James M. Cox	Luella M. Rhodes	100,469
Socialist Party	Eugene V. Debs	George W. Kounz	8,046
Socialist Party	Eugene V. Debs	Lauren E. Arnold	8,036
Socialist Party	Eugene V. Debs	Channing Sweet	7,940
Socialist Party	Eugene V. Debs	Charles A. Ahlstrom	7,860
Socialist Party	Eugene V. Debs	Ira D. McFadden	7,829
Socialist Party	Eugene V. Debs	Henry H. Sweetland	7,605
Farmer-Labor Party	Parley P. Christensen	Hattie K. Howard	3,016
Farmer-Labor Party	Parley P. Christensen	Martha Ackerly	2,898
Farmer-Labor Party	Parley P. Christensen	E. S. Agnew	2,880
Prohibition Party	Aaron S. Watkins	Henry Candlin	2,807
Farmer-Labor Party	Parley P. Christensen	Olga W. Levine	2,791
Prohibition Party	Aaron S. Watkins	Edgar Wilkinson	2,539
Prohibition Party	Aaron S. Watkins	Charles H. W. Lauenstein	2,496
Prohibition Party	Aaron S. Watkins	Edward L. Crane	2,474
Prohibition Party	Aaron S. Watkins	P. A. Rice	2,473
Prohibition Party	Aaron S. Watkins	J. R. Wylie	2,364
Votes cast (Note: Based on totals for highest elector on each ticket)			292,053

=== Results by county ===
County	Warren Gamaliel Harding Republican		James Middleton Cox Democratic		Eugene Victor Debs Socialist		Parley Parker Christensen Farmer-Labor		Aaron Sherman Watkins Prohibition		Margin	
County	%	#	%	#	%	#	%	#	%	#	%	#
Jackson	76.28%	402	21.44%	113	0.19%	1	0.57%	3	1.52%	8	54.84%	289
Morgan	70.45%	3,114	25.00%	1,105	2.19%	97	0.86%	38	1.49%	66	45.45%	2,009
Phillips	66.80%	1,191	26.92%	480	4.94%	88	0.84%	15	0.50%	9	39.88%	711
Elbert	66.35%	1,654	27.00%	673	3.33%	83	1.81%	45	1.52%	38	39.35%	981
Kit Carson	65.48%	1,872	27.84%	796	4.16%	119	1.29%	37	1.22%	35	37.64%	1,076
Cheyenne	64.57%	840	27.52%	358	5.07%	66	1.15%	15	1.69%	22	37.05%	482
Gilpin	66.99%	416	30.43%	189	1.45%	9	1.13%	7	0.00%	0	36.55%	227
Baca	63.21%	1,615	27.20%	695	7.16%	183	0.86%	22	1.57%	40	36.01%	920
Sedgwick	65.31%	819	29.67%	372	2.55%	32	0.56%	7	1.91%	24	35.65%	447
Moffat	65.42%	1,294	29.78%	589	2.63%	52	1.31%	26	0.86%	17	35.64%	705
Prowers	65.00%	2,650	30.59%	1,247	2.16%	88	0.91%	37	1.35%	55	34.41%	1,403
Yuma	63.42%	2,673	29.75%	1,254	4.46%	188	0.78%	33	1.59%	67	33.67%	1,419
Larimer	64.34%	5,487	31.75%	2,708	1.91%	163	0.66%	56	1.34%	114	32.59%	2,779
Hinsdale	59.13%	149	26.59%	67	9.92%	25	1.19%	3	3.17%	8	32.54%	82
Washington	63.44%	2,117	31.77%	1,060	2.79%	93	1.11%	37	0.90%	30	31.68%	1,057
Weld	63.78%	10,268	32.31%	5,202	1.50%	242	0.78%	125	1.63%	263	31.47%	5,066
Custer	63.28%	560	32.66%	289	2.15%	19	1.24%	11	0.68%	6	30.62%	271
Denver	62.03%	43,581	32.51%	22,839	3.21%	2,258	1.57%	1,102	0.68%	478	29.52%	20,742
El Paso	62.78%	9,535	33.40%	5,073	1.87%	284	0.76%	115	1.20%	182	29.38%	4,462
Archuleta	63.12%	700	34.17%	379	1.08%	12	0.45%	5	1.17%	13	28.94%	321
Jefferson	61.52%	3,593	33.24%	1,941	3.27%	191	1.30%	76	0.67%	39	28.29%	1,652
Conejos	63.50%	1,595	35.27%	886	0.32%	8	0.44%	11	0.48%	12	28.22%	709
Ouray	61.51%	735	33.64%	402	2.26%	27	2.01%	24	0.59%	7	27.87%	333
Lincoln	61.26%	1,815	34.19%	1,013	2.70%	80	1.05%	31	0.81%	24	27.07%	802
Rio Blanco	62.24%	793	35.71%	455	0.78%	10	0.31%	4	0.94%	12	26.53%	338
Douglas	61.40%	948	36.33%	561	1.04%	16	0.52%	8	0.71%	11	25.06%	387
Crowley	60.64%	1,348	35.63%	792	1.57%	35	0.45%	10	1.71%	38	25.01%	556
Rio Grande	61.01%	1,660	36.20%	985	1.07%	29	0.48%	13	1.25%	34	24.81%	675
Bent	60.67%	1,584	35.89%	937	1.15%	30	0.92%	24	1.38%	36	24.78%	647
Saguache	60.32%	1,195	36.19%	717	2.52%	50	0.25%	5	0.71%	14	24.13%	478
Arapahoe	59.80%	2,930	35.76%	1,752	2.16%	106	1.59%	78	0.69%	34	24.04%	1,178
Kiowa	59.63%	864	35.96%	521	2.69%	39	0.21%	3	1.52%	22	23.67%	343
Logan	59.71%	3,123	36.20%	1,893	1.59%	83	1.26%	66	1.24%	65	23.52%	1,230
Park	58.20%	511	36.45%	320	4.44%	39	0.46%	4	0.46%	4	21.75%	191
Boulder	57.91%	6,456	37.67%	4,200	2.64%	294	0.65%	73	1.12%	125	20.24%	2,256
Teller	57.89%	1,552	37.67%	1,010	3.32%	89	0.67%	18	0.45%	12	20.22%	542
Adams	57.57%	2,510	37.45%	1,633	3.19%	139	0.99%	43	0.80%	35	20.11%	877
Routt	57.51%	1,854	37.97%	1,224	2.98%	96	1.02%	33	0.53%	17	19.54%	630
Clear Creek	58.31%	765	39.48%	518	1.14%	15	0.61%	8	0.46%	6	18.83%	247
Delta	56.40%	2,596	38.02%	1,750	3.76%	173	0.78%	36	1.04%	48	18.38%	846
Montrose	54.83%	2,225	37.51%	1,522	5.20%	211	0.91%	37	1.55%	63	17.32%	703
Otero	55.93%	3,846	39.66%	2,727	1.69%	116	0.58%	40	2.14%	147	16.27%	1,119
San Miguel	54.30%	928	40.26%	688	3.45%	59	0.82%	14	1.17%	20	14.04%	240
Eagle	55.13%	854	41.90%	649	1.81%	28	0.84%	13	0.32%	5	13.23%	205
Lake	53.16%	1,287	40.97%	992	3.72%	90	1.73%	42	0.41%	10	12.19%	295
Fremont	53.33%	3,027	41.21%	2,339	3.22%	183	0.76%	43	1.48%	84	12.12%	688
Garfield	54.32%	1,912	42.30%	1,489	2.16%	76	0.88%	31	0.34%	12	12.02%	423
Montezuma	52.20%	936	40.55%	727	4.57%	82	1.28%	23	1.39%	25	11.66%	209
Dolores	48.28%	197	37.50%	153	11.27%	46	1.96%	8	0.98%	4	10.78%	44
Mineral	49.33%	183	39.35%	146	9.43%	35	1.62%	6	0.27%	1	9.97%	37
Pueblo	53.13%	9,621	43.42%	7,863	2.41%	436	0.59%	107	0.45%	82	9.71%	1,758
Chaffee	52.91%	1,501	43.46%	1,233	2.50%	71	0.53%	15	0.60%	17	9.45%	268
La Plata	50.85%	1,711	42.94%	1,445	4.25%	143	1.04%	35	0.92%	31	7.90%	266
Grand	52.51%	649	44.74%	553	1.13%	14	1.38%	17	0.24%	3	7.77%	96
Mesa	49.80%	3,621	43.16%	3,138	4.10%	298	1.42%	103	1.53%	111	6.64%	483
Alamosa	51.87%	1,081	45.54%	949	1.49%	31	0.67%	14	0.43%	9	6.33%	132
Pitkin	49.38%	478	43.08%	417	4.13%	40	2.79%	27	0.62%	6	6.30%	61
San Juan	50.46%	330	44.34%	290	3.52%	23	1.22%	8	0.46%	3	6.12%	40
Las Animas	51.19%	4,707	45.31%	4,167	2.31%	212	0.67%	62	0.52%	48	5.87%	540
Huerfano	51.42%	2,539	46.40%	2,291	0.81%	40	0.73%	36	0.65%	32	5.02%	248
Summit	50.36%	418	46.75%	388	2.05%	17	0.48%	4	0.36%	3	3.61%	30
Costilla	49.52%	778	47.74%	750	1.15%	18	0.76%	12	0.83%	13	1.78%	28
Gunnison	47.46%	1,055	45.97%	1,022	5.67%	126	0.54%	12	0.36%	8	1.48%	33
