= Creede Repertory Theatre =

Repertory theater company in Creede, Colorado, United States

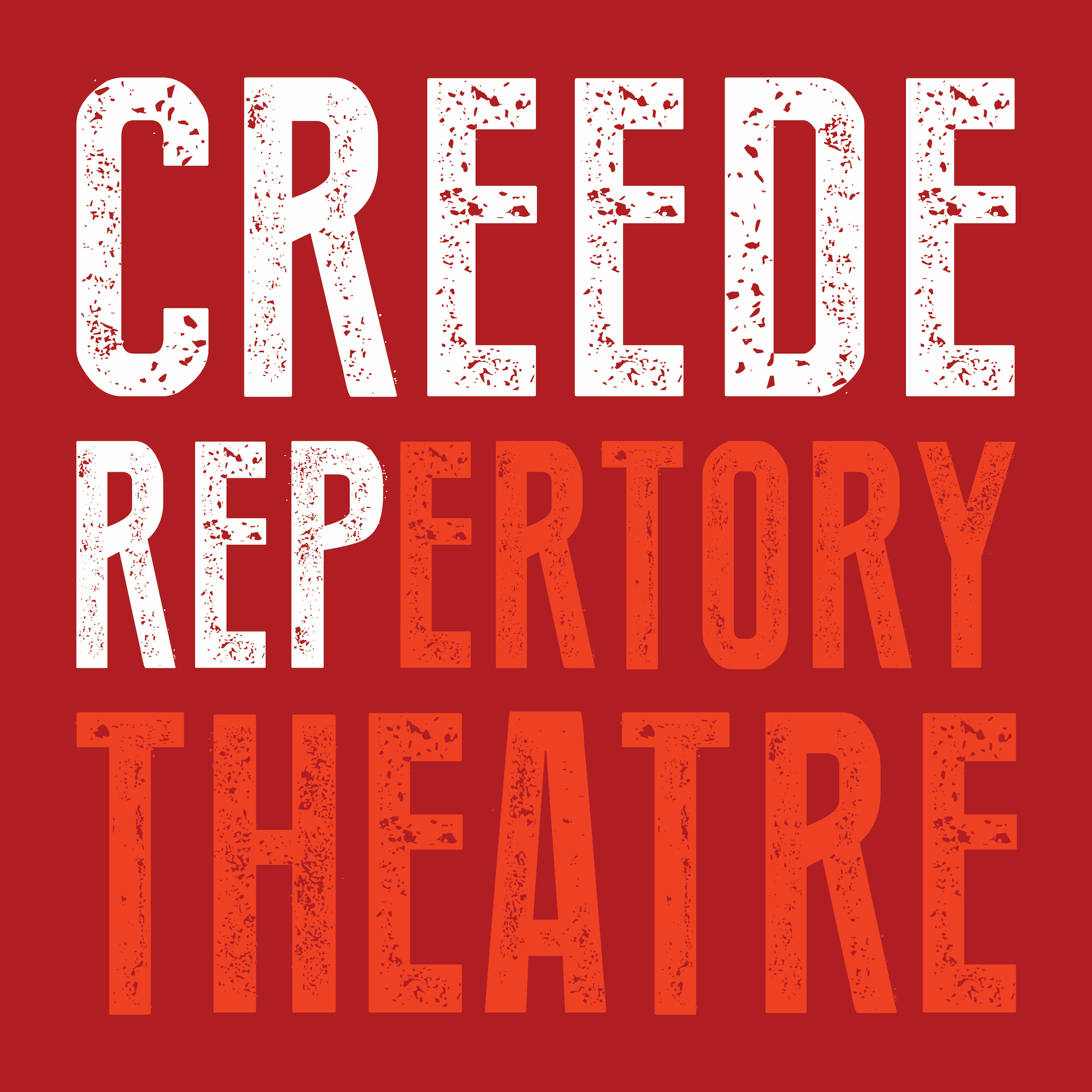
Creede Repertory Theatre logo

Creede Repertory Theatre (CRT or Creede Rep) is a summer theatre that operates from early May through mid-September. Founded in 1966, CRT is a professional theatre company located at nearly 9,000 feet of elevation in the historic town of Creede, Colorado. In addition to live theatre, it offers a variety of educational programs including summer and Friday day camps, the KID's Show program, and the Young Audience Outreach Tour [YAOT].

== History ==
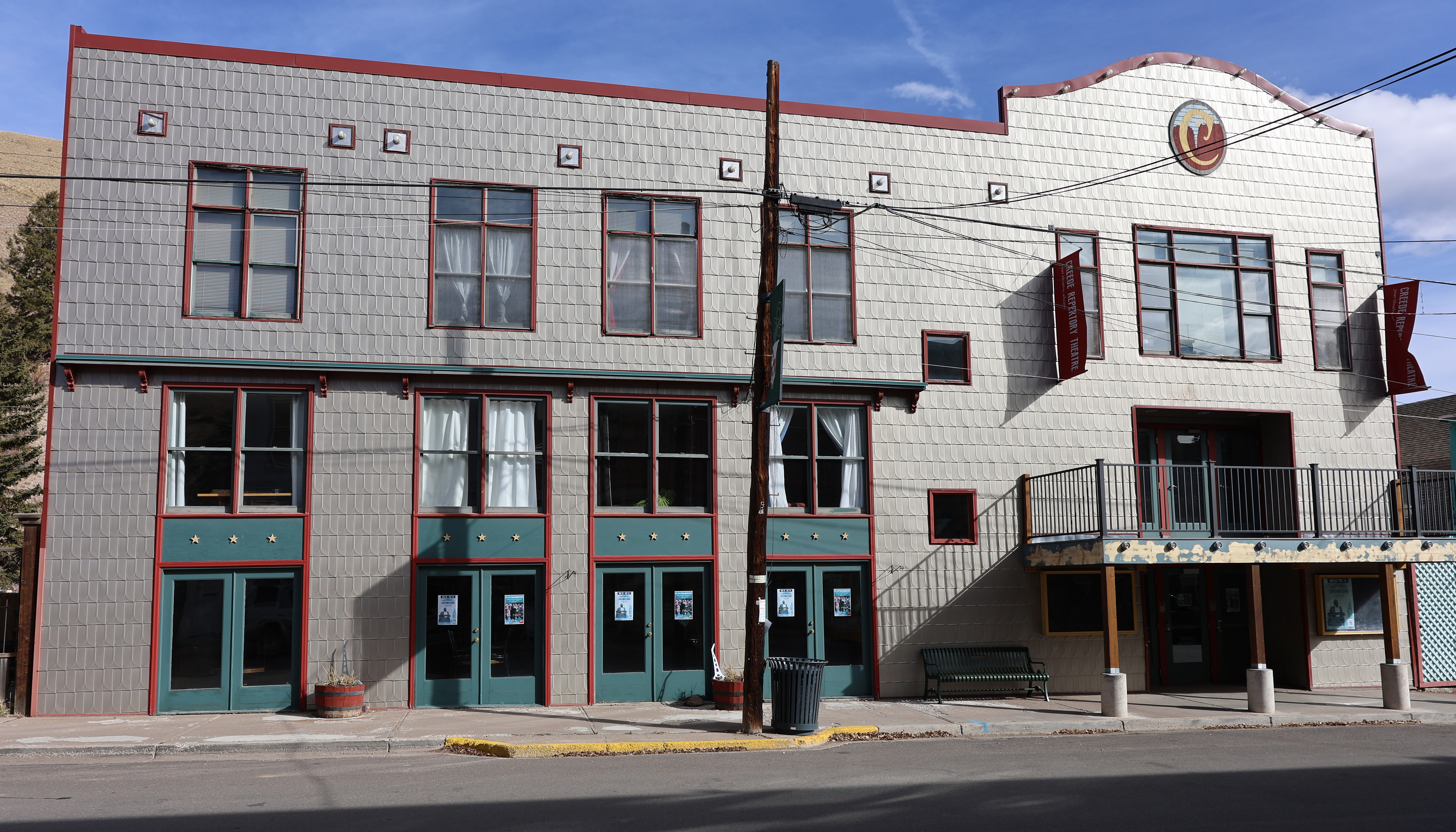
The CRT Mainstage building

The Creede Repertory Theatre (CRT) was founded in 1966 when 12 students from the University of Kansas came to Creede, Colorado, responding to a letter drafted by the Creede Junior Chamber of Commerce and Pastor Jim Livingston. The letter was a call for help. With the mining business declining in Creede, the town needed a new source of viable income to help sustain the smaller businesses and its year-round residents. Steve Grossman, a theatre student at KU, was the only one who responded to the letter. He and fellow student Joe Roach took a road trip to Creede in the spring of 1966 and sealed the deal with a handshake. Grossman then took 11 students with him, and together, they launched the first of many summer theatre seasons in Creede, first calling the theatre Operation Summer Theatre. The name changed to Creede Repertory Theatre in 1968. The first season began with the opening of Mr. Roberts and continued with the showing of The Bat, Our Town, The Rainmaker, and Born Yesterday. Shows ran in repertory format, which allowed patrons to see a new play each night of the week.

Musical theatre composer and actor Mark Houston began his career at the CRT in 1976. His children's musical Reggie and the Riddle of the Differcus was premiered by the CRT in 1977, and his children's opera Harbledown! was premiered at the CRT in 1982.

== The theatre today ==
The theatre continues operating on the principles that Grossman and the KU theatre students established. CRT maintains a rigorous repertory schedule, continues to employ an ensemble cast and crew, and chooses a diverse selection of plays. In 2005, USA Today ranked CRT as one of the “10 great places to see lights way off Broadway.” The 2006 company received 11 Ovation nominations from the Denver Post. In 2007, CRT received the National Theatre Conference's Outstanding Achievement Award. Presently, CRT is the largest summer employer in all of Mineral County.

=== 2022 season ===
- Steel Magnolias by Robert Harling, May 28-Sept 17
- Always...Patsy Cline created & originally directed by Ted Swindley. Based on a true story May 29-Sept 17
- Native Gardens by Karen Zacarías. June 18-Sept 11
- Ken Ludwig's Sherwood: The Adventures of Robin Hood, June 25-Sept 10
- Boomtown! Improv Comedy, July 1-Sept 9
- The KID Show: Music Box by Allison Quiller, July 8–10
- Young Audience Outreach Tour: Casa Alfonsa with book and lyrics by Diana Grisanti, music by Emiliano Messiez

=== 2012 season ===
- The Drowsy Chaperone
- Mrs. Mannerly
- Presidents!
- Is He Dead?
- Ghost Writer
- Harry the Great
- Boomtown

=== 2011 season ===
- I Capture the Castle
- How to Succeed in Business without Really Trying
- Unnecessary Farce
- The Road to Mecca
- The Bad Man
- The Mystery of Irma Vep
- Boomtown

=== 2010 season ===
- The 25th Annual Putnam County Spelling Bee, June 4-August 21
- The 39 Steps, June 18-September 25
- The Ladies Man, June 25-August 28
- This Day and Age, July 23-September 24
- The Joy of Going Somewhere Definite, August 20-September 25
- Zeus on the Loose, May 29-August 7
- Boomtown, July 2-August 21
