= Nicaagat =

Ute leader

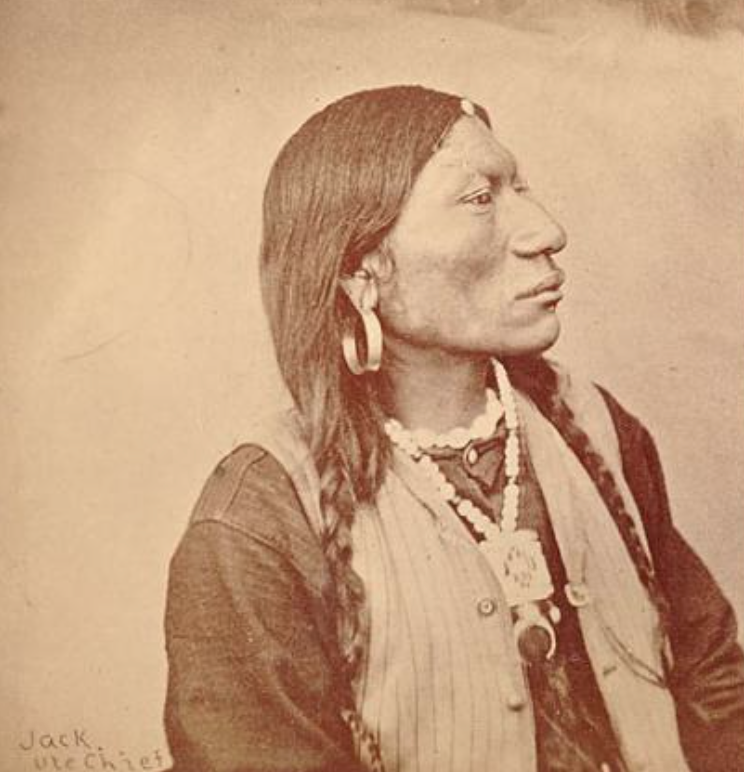
- Photographed by George W. Kirkland, 1873, National Museum of Natural History, Smithsonian Institution
- Born: c. 1840
- Died: ca. April 29, 1882
- Other names: Ute Jack, Captain Jack, Chief Jack
- Occupation: Ute chief

Nicaagat (leaves becoming green, c. 1840–1882), also known as Chief, Captain and Ute Jack and Green Leaf. (Note: His name is pronounced ni-ca-a-gat. His name refers to the spring when the green leaves appear on the cottonwood trees.) A Ute warrior and subchief, he led a Ute war party against the United States Army when it crossed Milk Creek onto the Ute reservation, which triggered the Battle of Milk Creek. Prior to the conflict, he had traveled to meet up with Major Thomas Tipton Thornburgh to learn of his intentions and warn him that crossing the Milk Creek onto the White River Ute reservation would be seen as an invasion and an act of war. When the army entered the reservation, a shooter from Nicaagat's band shot and killed Thornburgh.

He went to Washington, D.C. to speak before Congress following the battle to defend his actions.

As a boy, Nicaagat was orphaned and then sold to a Mormon family. He was educated at a school with white children and attended church with the family. He lived with the family a number of years and ran away after being threatened to be whipped. He traveled to Colorado and joined with the White River Utes when he married a young woman from the tribe. He became a leader to the younger men and was a scout for General George Crook during the Sioux Wars of 1876 and 1877.

== Background ==
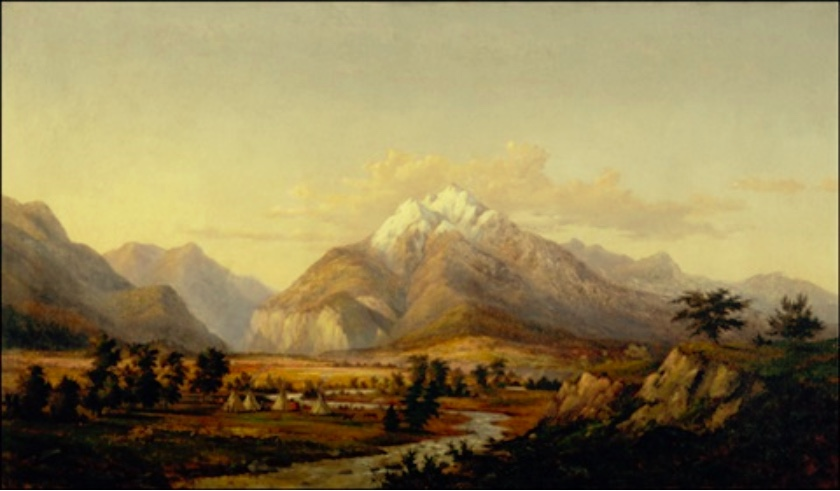
Ute camp, Henry Chapman Ford

Nicaagat was a Ute chief of Colorado. The Utes were nomadic people who ranged across their extensive hunting grounds for large and small game in family groups. Bands of family groups met with other Utes during the year for religious and traditional ceremonies, like the Bear Dance. They gathered foods—like berries, roots, nuts—and fished. They lived in tipis and wickiups. In the 1800s traders and miners encroached on their land, followed by settlers. They exposed the Utes to disease, like smallpox.

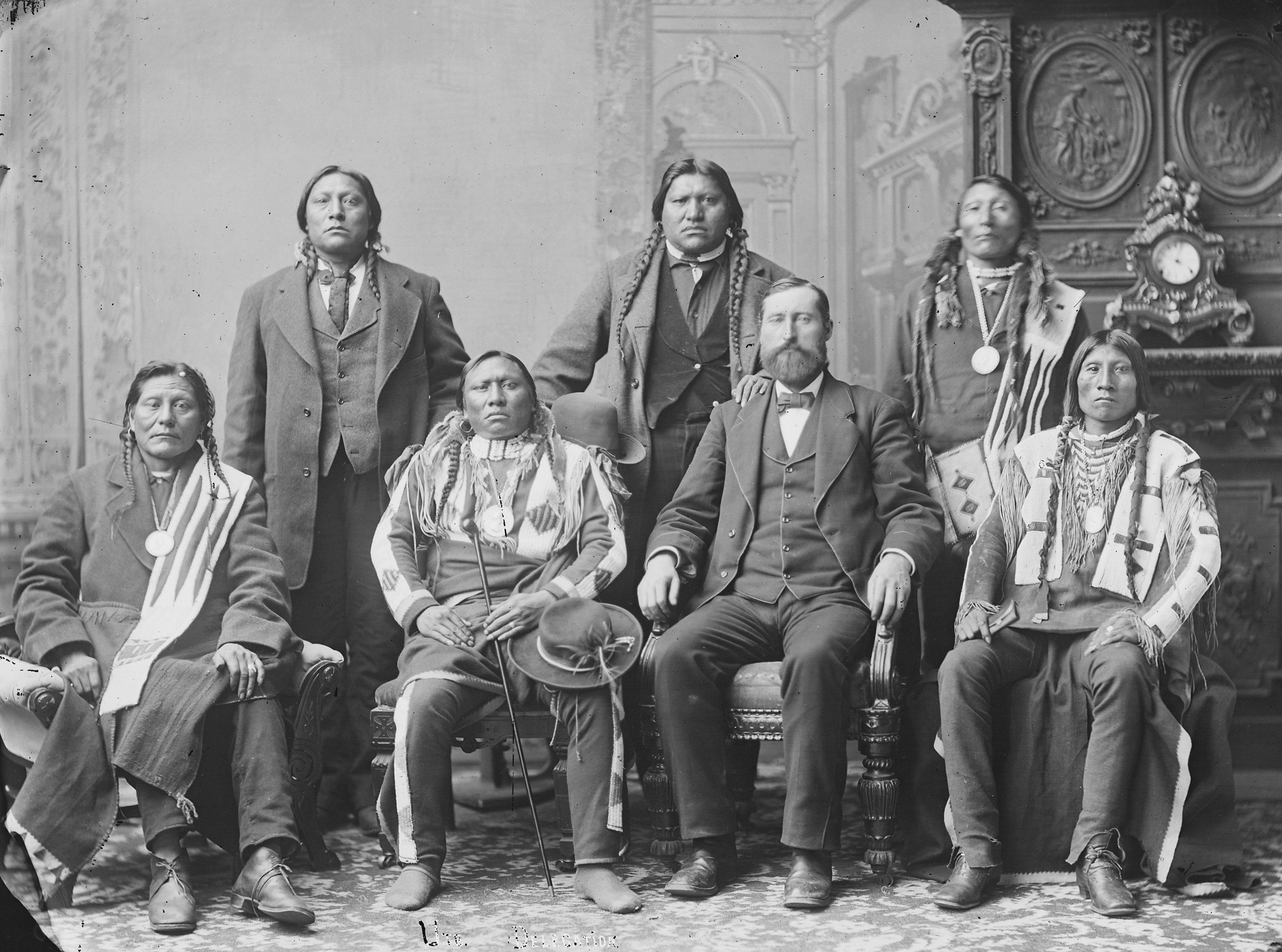
Ute delegation, Washington, D.C., Bureau of American Ethnology, Smithsonian Institution

Informal and formal measures were used to negotiate with whites, which ultimately resulted in the loss of Ute land and establishment of the Ouray and Uintah reservations. Now, there are three Ute bands: Uintah of Utah, and Uncompaghre and White River Utes (Nüpartka) of Colorado. The White River and Uncompahgre Utes lived on a Colorado reservation under the Treaty of 1868. In Colorado in the 1870s, Ute tribal land had covered 12 million acres west of the Continental Divide and included land in the south around Ignacio and Durango, centered around Milk Creek and Meeker, and in the north including Aspen.

== Early life ==
Born in 1840, Nicaagat was of Ute and Apache heritage — or, he was a Goshute. He was orphaned as a young child in Utah. He was sold by Spanish slave traders to a Mormon family, with white children. The family had him baptized, sent him to school, and he went with them to church. He was beat often, which made him hate whites. He lived a number of years with the family. One day the woman of the house became angry and had a poised buggy whip in her hand. Nicaagat ran to a saddled horse and escaped into the mountains, meeting up with other Native Americans who gave him food and shelter on his journey.

He met his wife in the spring, at his first annual Bear Dance since his escape. His wife chose him and her parents agreed with the match. He became a member of the White River Utes, and a leader among the young men.

Nicaagat went with Ouray and other chiefs to Washington, D.C. in January 1868. The purpose of the visit was to sign a treaty that would define the territorial borders of the Ute people.

Having learned to speak English fluently, he served as a scout for General George Crook in 1876 and 1877. Crook fought the Sioux, enemies of the Ute people. Nicaagat saw first-hand what could happen when the military entered a Native American reservation.

== Meeker Massacre ==
Nathan Meeker, an Indian agent, was appointed to the White River Indian Agency in 1878. Meeker fought against Utes traditional ways of life. He did not like that they used pasture land for race horses. He ordered the Utes to take up farming, using their race horses to plow fields. Tensions rose between the Utes and Meekers. Ute leaders, including Ouray, his wife Chipeta, Nicaagat, Colorow, Black Hawk and others tried to resolve problems between the United States government and the Utes.

Nicaagat returned to the Ute reservation and found it absurd that Meeker intended to turn brave hunting Utes into gardeners who took the orders from an Indian agent. Meeker was said to have said that half of their prized horses needed to be shot and killed and that the Utes' race track needed to be plowed over for crops, and Meeker rejected the use of other nearby land for farming. There were fights over construction of irrigation ditches. Tensions grew and Meeker sent out warnings to the government. Meeker provided content for Denver newspaper articles. Nicaagat met with Colorado governor Frederick W. Pitkin, telling him that Meeker's statements were lies. Major Thomas Tipton Thornburgh of Fort Steele was sent to Colorado to address the situation.

Nicaagat and other warriors met Thornburg at Fortification Creek, and again at Peck's Trading Post near present-day Craig, Colorado to assess Thornburgh's motives. Nicaagat also conveyed that they did not want the soldiers to cross into the reservation. To do so would be to go against the Ute's treaty with Governor Pitkin. Nicaagat suggested that a group of five soldiers and five Utes go to the Indian agency together to meet with Meeker. Thornburg discussed the compromise with his scouts, who recommended him to be wary of the Utes, that the suggestion could be a ruse. Thornburgh did not believe that the Utes were dangerous, based upon history with them, but he decided to follow his original order, which was to send his full force onto the reservation. Thornburgh to Nicaagat that he needed to assess the situation before he would develop a plan.

Nicaagat left the army encampment and went to Peck's trading post where had purchased 10,000 rounds of ammunitions, superior to those of the military. While he was away, war dances were held by the Utes at the agency. They remembered the Sand Creek Massacre when Black Kettle's village of sleeping women and children was attacked by 700 soldiers while the Cheyenne men were off hunting.

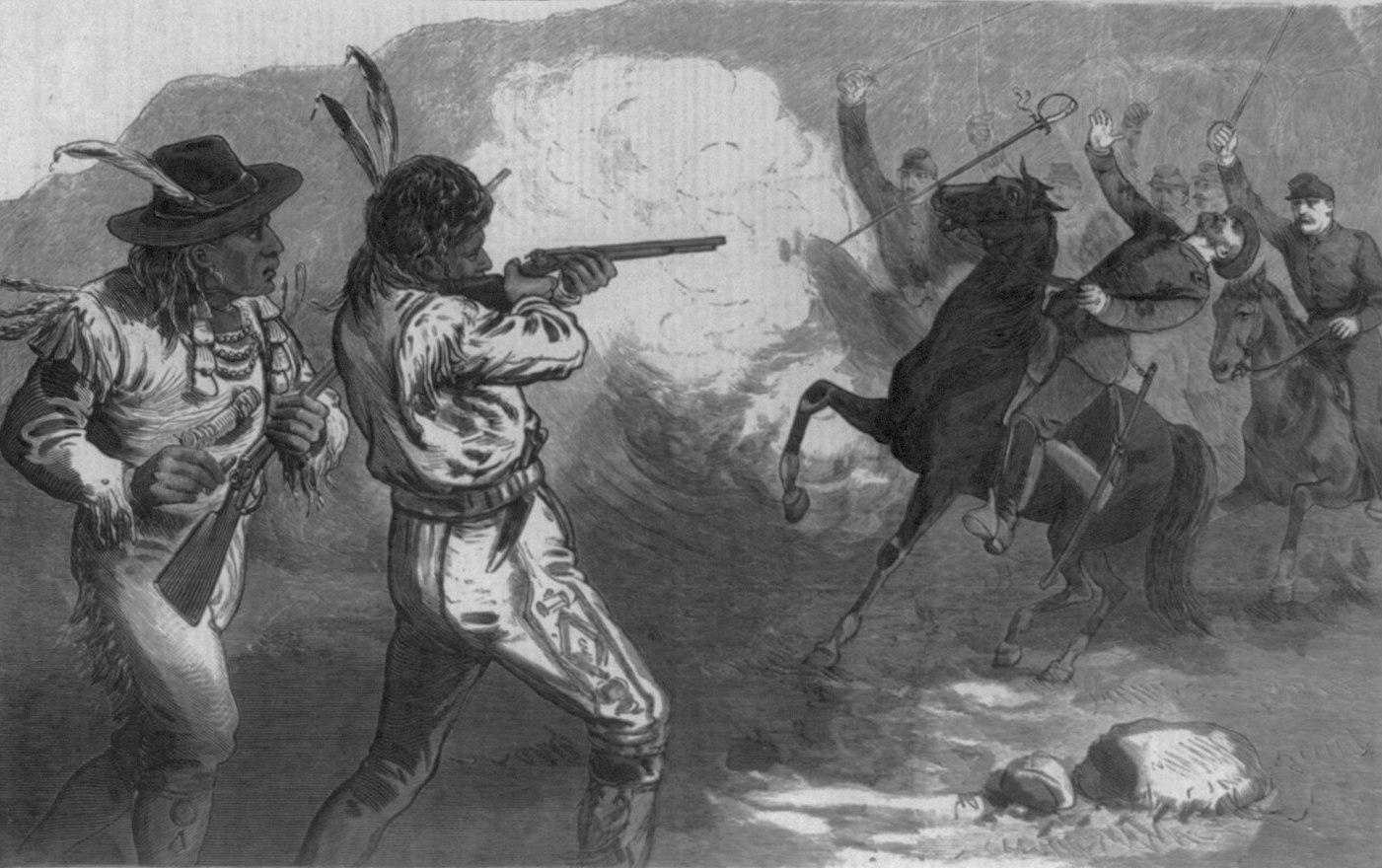
The Milk Creek disaster - death of Major Thornburgh, of the Fourth United States Infantry, while leading soldiers into the White River Ute Reservation

When the military crossed Milk Creek onto the Ute reservation, it was seen as an invasion and an act of war. Nicaagat led the Meeker Uprising and Battle of Milk Creek of September 29, 1879 and claimed that he was the one who killed Major Thomas Tipton Thornburgh. Meeker and 11 people at the agency were killed during the Meeker Massacre, after which military forces were established at the site of Meeker, Colorado. Fearing a massacre like that at Sand Creek, the Utes surrendered on October 5.

General Hatch held a commission to study the Meeker Massacre and Battle of Milk Creek. He determined that no Utes would be tried for the battle against the United States military, but those involved in the killing or kidnapping of people from the Indian Agency would need to be brought in. Colorow and Nicaagat were selected to bring Quinkent and others in for a trial outside of Colorado. Nicaagat would never forgiven by the Utes, so he with his wife and children left the reservation. (Note: The 1880 Ute Removal Act removed the Utes of the White River Ute Reservation to the Utah reservation.)

== Later years, death, and legacy ==
Nicaagat went to live on a Shoshone reservation in Wyoming. Seven men from the cavalry came to find him, saying that he was off the reservation. The Indian Agency had asked for his arrest, which was made on April 29, 1882, near Fort Washakie, Wyoming. Soon after, he escaped and entered a nearby tipi. He found a carbine and killed a soldier of the third cavalry, Sergeant Richard Casey. He was shot in the arm. The tipi that he ran into was fired upon by soldiers with a howitzer and he was killed.

His portrait was made by Joseph Lee Hershel in the 1930s. It is in the collection of the History Colorado Center.

== Bibliography ==
- Emmitt, Robert (1954). The last war trail; the Utes and the settlement of Colorado. Norman, University of Oklahoma Press.
- Marsh, Charles S. (Charles Seabrooke) (1982). People of the shining mountains : the Utes of Colorado. Boulder, Colo. : Pruett Pub. Co. ISBN 978-0-87108-620-4.
