= List of municipalities in Colorado/map =

Wikimedia list article

The location of the 272 active municipalities of the State of Colorado
Municipality	Location (Note: Geographic location from the Geographic Names Information System.)
Aguilar	37.4028°N 104.6533°W
Akron	40.1605°N 103.2144°W
Alamosa	37.4694°N 105.8700°W
Alma	39.2839°N 106.0628°W
Antonito	37.0792°N 106.0086°W
Arriba	39.2861°N 103.2755°W
Arvada	39.8028°N 105.0875°W
Aspen	39.1911°N 106.8175°W
Ault	40.5825°N 104.7319°W
Aurora	39.7294°N 104.8319°W
Avon	39.6314°N 106.5223°W
Basalt	39.3689°N 107.0328°W
Bayfield	37.2256°N 107.5981°W
Bennett	39.7589°N 104.4275°W
Berthoud	40.3083°N 105.0811°W
Bethune	39.3042°N 102.4246°W
Black Hawk	39.8038°N 105.4952°W
Blanca	37.4381°N 105.5158°W
Blue River	39.4297°N 106.0439°W
Bonanza	38.2947°N 106.1422°W
Boone	38.2486°N 104.2569°W
Boulder	40.0150°N 105.2705°W
Bow Mar	39.6283°N 105.0500°W
Branson	37.0175°N 103.8844°W
Breckenridge	39.4817°N 106.0384°W
Brighton	39.9853°N 104.8205°W
Brookside	38.4153°N 105.1919°W
Broomfield	39.9205°N 105.0867°W
Brush	40.2589°N 103.6238°W
Buena Vista	38.8422°N 106.1311°W
Burlington	39.3061°N 102.2694°W
Calhan	39.0355°N 104.2972°W
Campo	37.1050°N 102.5796°W
Cañon City	38.4410°N 105.2424°W
Carbonate	39.7430°N 107.3467°W
Carbondale	39.4022°N 107.2112°W
Castle Pines	39.4717°N 104.8948°W
Castle Rock	39.3722°N 104.8561°W
Cedaredge	38.9016°N 107.9265°W
Centennial	39.5792°N 104.8769°W
Center	37.7531°N 106.1086°W
Central City	39.8019°N 105.5142°W
Cheraw	38.1070°N 103.5102°W
Cherry Hills Village	39.6417°N 104.9594°W
Cheyenne Wells	38.8214°N 102.3532°W
Coal Creek	38.3611°N 105.1483°W
Cokedale	37.1453°N 104.6211°W
Collbran	39.2405°N 107.9612°W
Colorado Springs	38.8339°N 104.8214°W
Columbine Valley	39.6011°N 105.0322°W
Commerce City	39.8083°N 104.9339°W
Cortez	37.3489°N 108.5859°W
Craig	40.5152°N 107.5465°W
Crawford	38.7039°N 107.6089°W
Creede	37.8492°N 106.9264°W
Crested Butte	38.8697°N 106.9878°W
Crestone	37.9964°N 105.6997°W
Cripple Creek	38.7467°N 105.1783°W
Crook	40.8589°N 102.8010°W
Crowley	38.1931°N 103.8561°W
Dacono	40.0847°N 104.9394°W
De Beque	39.3344°N 108.2151°W
Deer Trail	39.6150°N 104.0444°W
Del Norte	37.6789°N 106.3534°W
Delta	38.7422°N 108.0690°W
Denver	39.7392°N 104.9849°W
Dillon	39.6303°N 106.0434°W
Dinosaur	40.2436°N 109.0146°W
Dolores	37.4739°N 108.5045°W
Dove Creek	37.7661°N 108.9059°W
Durango	37.2753°N 107.8801°W
Eads	38.4806°N 102.7819°W
Eagle	39.6553°N 106.8287°W
Eaton	40.5303°N 104.7114°W
Eckley	40.1139°N 102.4908°W
Edgewater	39.7530°N 105.0642°W
Elizabeth	39.3603°N 104.5969°W
Empire	39.7614°N 105.6844°W
Englewood	39.6478°N 104.9878°W
Erie	40.0503°N 105.0500°W
Estes Park	40.3772°N 105.5217°W
Evans	40.3764°N 104.6922°W
Fairplay	39.2247°N 106.0020°W
Federal Heights	39.8514°N 104.9986°W
Firestone	40.1125°N 104.9366°W
Flagler	39.2930°N 103.0672°W
Fleming	40.6800°N 102.8394°W
Florence	38.3903°N 105.1186°W
Fort Collins	40.5853°N 105.0844°W
Fort Lupton	40.0847°N 104.8130°W
Fort Morgan	40.2503°N 103.8000°W
Fountain	38.6822°N 104.7008°W
Fowler	38.1292°N 104.0233°W
Foxfield	39.5917°N 104.7925°W
Fraser	39.9450°N 105.8172°W
Frederick	40.0992°N 104.9372°W
Frisco	39.5744°N 106.0975°W
Fruita	39.1589°N 108.7290°W
Garden City	40.3939°N 104.6894°W
Genoa	39.2783°N 103.5002°W
Georgetown	39.7061°N 105.6975°W
Gilcrest	40.2819°N 104.7777°W
Glendale	39.7050°N 104.9336°W
Glenwood Springs	39.5505°N 107.3248°W
Golden	39.7555°N 105.2211°W
Granada	38.0639°N 102.3105°W
Granby	40.0861°N 105.9395°W
Grand Junction	39.0639°N 108.5506°W
Grand Lake	40.2522°N 105.8231°W
Greeley	40.4233°N 104.7091°W
Green Mountain Falls	38.9350°N 105.0169°W
Greenwood Village	39.6172°N 104.9508°W
Grover	40.8714°N 104.2252°W
Gunnison	38.5458°N 106.9253°W
Gypsum	39.6469°N 106.9517°W
Haswell	38.4522°N 103.1630°W
Haxtun	40.6411°N 102.6269°W
Hayden	40.4953°N 107.2573°W
Hillrose	40.3258°N 103.5219°W
Holly	38.0522°N 102.1227°W
Holyoke	40.5844°N 102.3024°W
Hooper	37.7428°N 105.8753°W
Hot Sulphur Springs	40.0730°N 106.1028°W
Hotchkiss	38.7997°N 107.7195°W
Hudson	40.0736°N 104.6430°W
Hugo	39.1361°N 103.4699°W
Idaho Springs	39.7425°N 105.5136°W
Ignacio	37.1150°N 107.6331°W
Iliff	40.7592°N 103.0666°W
Jamestown	40.1155°N 105.3886°W
Johnstown	40.3369°N 104.9122°W
Julesburg	40.9883°N 102.2644°W
Keenesburg	40.1083°N 104.5200°W
Kersey	40.3875°N 104.5616°W
Keystone	39.5994°N 105.9872°W
Kim	37.2467°N 103.3522°W
Kiowa	39.3472°N 104.4644°W
Kit Carson	38.7611°N 102.7894°W
Kremmling	40.0589°N 106.3889°W
La Jara	37.2750°N 105.9603°W
La Junta	37.9850°N 103.5438°W
La Veta	37.5050°N 105.0078°W
Lafayette	39.9936°N 105.0897°W
Lake City	38.0300°N 107.3153°W
Lakeside	39.7772°N 105.0558°W
Lakewood	39.7047°N 105.0814°W
Lamar	38.0872°N 102.6207°W
Larkspur	39.2286°N 104.8872°W
Las Animas	38.0667°N 103.2227°W
LaSalle	40.3489°N 104.7019°W
Leadville	39.2508°N 106.2925°W
Limon	39.2639°N 103.6922°W
Littleton	39.6133°N 105.0166°W
Lochbuie	40.0072°N 104.7161°W
Log Lane Village	40.2705°N 103.8297°W
Lone Tree	39.5314°N 104.8620°W
Longmont	40.1672°N 105.1019°W
Louisville	39.9778°N 105.1319°W
Loveland	40.3978°N 105.0750°W
Lyons	40.2247°N 105.2714°W
Manassa	37.1742°N 105.9375°W
Mancos	37.3450°N 108.2892°W
Manitou Springs	38.8597°N 104.9172°W
Manzanola	38.1095°N 103.8661°W
Marble	39.0722°N 107.1889°W
Mead	40.2333°N 104.9986°W
Meeker	40.0375°N 107.9131°W
Merino	40.4825°N 103.3513°W
Milliken	40.3294°N 104.8553°W
Minturn	39.5864°N 106.4309°W
Moffat	37.9989°N 105.9100°W
Monte Vista	37.5792°N 106.1481°W
Montezuma	39.5811°N 105.8672°W
Montrose	38.4783°N 107.8762°W
Monument	39.0917°N 104.8728°W
Morrison	39.6536°N 105.1911°W
Mount Crested Butte	38.9086°N 106.9695°W
Mountain View	39.7744°N 105.0555°W
Mountain Village	37.9314°N 107.8565°W
Naturita	38.2183°N 108.5687°W
Nederland	39.9614°N 105.5108°W
New Castle	39.5728°N 107.5364°W
Northglenn	39.8855°N 104.9872°W
Norwood	38.1305°N 108.2923°W
Nucla	38.2694°N 108.5479°W
Nunn	40.7036°N 104.7808°W
Oak Creek	40.2750°N 106.9584°W
Olathe	38.6050°N 107.9823°W
Olney Springs	38.1661°N 103.9447°W
Ophir	37.8569°N 107.8326°W
Orchard City	38.8283°N 107.9709°W
Ordway	38.2181°N 103.7561°W
Otis	40.1489°N 102.9630°W
Ouray	38.0228°N 107.6714°W
Ovid	40.9605°N 102.3880°W
Pagosa Springs	37.2695°N 107.0098°W
Palisade	39.1103°N 108.3509°W
Palmer Lake	39.1222°N 104.9172°W
Paoli	40.6122°N 102.4727°W
Paonia	38.8683°N 107.5920°W
Parachute	39.4519°N 108.0529°W
Parker	39.5186°N 104.7614°W
Peetz	40.9628°N 103.1124°W
Pierce	40.6355°N 104.7552°W
Pitkin	38.6092°N 106.5167°W
Platteville	40.2150°N 104.8227°W
Poncha Springs	38.5128°N 106.0772°W
Pritchett	37.3717°N 102.8605°W
Pueblo	38.2544°N 104.6091°W
Ramah	39.1217°N 104.1658°W
Rangely	40.0875°N 108.8048°W
Raymer	40.6080°N 103.8425°W
Red Cliff	39.5122°N 106.3681°W
Rico	37.6928°N 108.0304°W
Ridgway	38.1528°N 107.7617°W
Rifle	39.5347°N 107.7831°W
Rockvale	38.3697°N 105.1639°W
Rocky Ford	38.0525°N 103.7202°W
Romeo	37.1722°N 105.9853°W
Rye	37.9236°N 104.9303°W
Saguache	38.0875°N 106.1420°W
Salida	38.5347°N 105.9989°W
San Luis	37.2008°N 105.4239°W
Sanford	37.2583°N 105.9047°W
Sawpit	37.9953°N 108.0017°W
Sedgwick	40.9364°N 102.5255°W
Seibert	39.2992°N 102.8691°W
Severance	40.5241°N 104.8511°W
Sheridan Lake	38.4667°N 102.2921°W
Sheridan	39.6469°N 105.0253°W
Silt	39.5486°N 107.6562°W
Silver Cliff	38.1353°N 105.4464°W
Silver Plume	39.6961°N 105.7258°W
Silverthorne	39.6321°N 106.0743°W
Silverton	37.8119°N 107.6645°W
Simla	39.1417°N 104.0838°W
Snowmass Village	39.2130°N 106.9378°W
South Fork	37.6700°N 106.6398°W
Springfield	37.4083°N 102.6144°W
Starkville	37.1153°N 104.5242°W
Steamboat Springs	40.4850°N 106.8317°W
Sterling	40.6255°N 103.2077°W
Stratton	39.3033°N 102.6046°W
Sugar City	38.2319°N 103.6630°W
Superior	39.9528°N 105.1686°W
Swink	38.0145°N 103.6283°W
Telluride	37.9375°N 107.8123°W
Thornton	39.8680°N 104.9719°W
Timnath	40.5291°N 104.9853°W
Trinidad	37.1695°N 104.5005°W
Two Buttes	37.5611°N 102.3977°W
Vail	39.6403°N 106.3742°W
Victor	38.7100°N 105.1400°W
Vilas	37.3736°N 102.4463°W
Vona	39.3036°N 102.7430°W
Walden	40.7316°N 106.2836°W
Walsenburg	37.6242°N 104.7803°W
Walsh	37.3861°N 102.2782°W
Ward	40.0722°N 105.5083°W
Wellington	40.7039°N 105.0086°W
Westcliffe	38.1347°N 105.4658°W
Westminster	39.8367°N 105.0372°W
Wheat Ridge	39.7661°N 105.0772°W
Wiggins	40.2305°N 104.0727°W
Wiley	38.1542°N 102.7196°W
Williamsburg	38.3819°N 105.1519°W
Windsor	40.4775°N 104.9014°W
Winter Park	39.8917°N 105.7631°W
Woodland Park	38.9939°N 105.0569°W
Wray	40.0758°N 102.2232°W
Yampa	40.1525°N 106.9087°W
Yuma	40.1222°N 102.7252°W
