= South Platte River Trail Scenic and Historic Byway =

Colorado Scenic and Historic Byway

Coordinates: 40.9663°N 102.2536°W

Route information
- Maintained by CDOT
- Length: 19 mi (31 km)
- Existed: 1991–present

Major junctions
- East end: US 138 / US 385 Julesburg
- West end: US 138 Ovid

Location
- Country: United States
- State: Colorado
- Counties: Sedgwick County

Highway system
- Colorado State Highway System; Interstate; US; State; Scenic

The South Platte River Trail Scenic and Historic Byway is a 19-mile (31 km) Colorado Scenic and Historic Byway located in Sedgwick County, Colorado, USA. The byway follows the historic trails used during westward expansion. The route, which includes County Road 28 (CR 28) and U.S. Highway 138 (US 138), connects Ovid and Julesburg and encircles the South Platte River. It was designated a Colorado Scenic and Historic Byway in 1991.

== Route ==
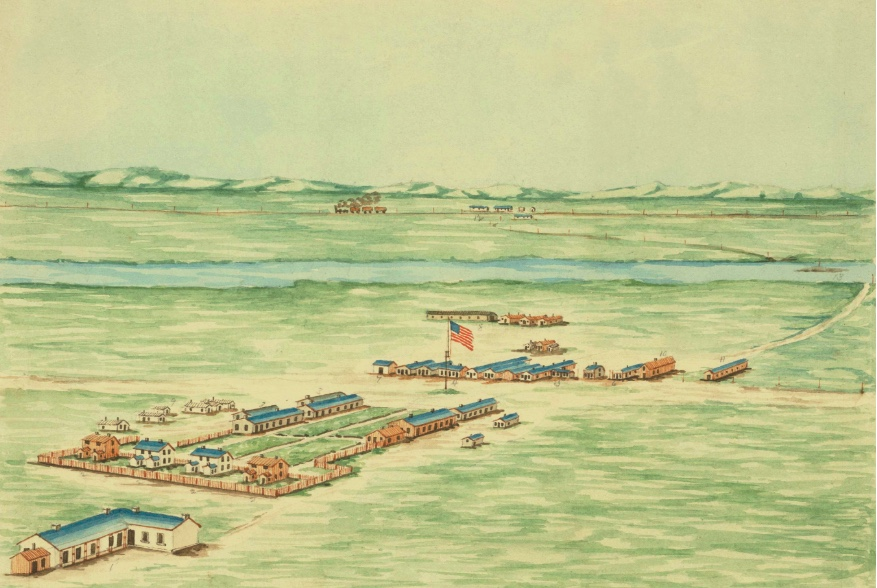
Anton Schonborn, Fort Sedgwick, 1870

There is a trailhead for the byway at the Colorado Welcome Center at Julesburg. Informative placards are found throughout the route to provide additional insight into the area's storied history. Area historic sites, three of which are on the route, include the 19th century Fort Sedgwick, the state's only Pony Express home station, Telegraph Line, and Transcontinental railroad. Other historic sites include the Italian Caves, Devil's Dive, Upper California Crossing, a former Prisoner-of-war camp in Ovid, and the Julesburg Drag Racing Strip. Along the route, informative placards provide information about Fort Sedgwick, the Pony Express, and the Transcontinental Railroad.

== See also ==
- History Colorado
