= U.S. Route 138 =

Highway in the United States

U.S. Route 138
- US 138 highlighted in red

Route information
- Auxiliary route of US 38
- Length: 71.29 mi (114.73 km)
- Existed: 1926–present

Major junctions
- West end: US 6 / SH 14 in Sterling, CO
- US 385 in Julesburg, CO; I-80 near Big Springs, NE
- East end: US 30 near Big Springs, NE

Location
- Country: United States
- States: Colorado, Nebraska
- Counties: CO: Logan, Sedgwick; NE: Deuel

Highway system
- United States Numbered Highway System; List; Special; Divided

U.S. Highway 138 (US 138), commissioned in 1926, is an east–west U.S. Highway in Colorado and Nebraska that travels predominantly northeast to southwest, paralleling the South Platte River and Interstate 76 (I-76). Similarly to the spurs of the former US 66 and US 99, US 138 is an orphan route. US 38 was commissioned in 1926, but US 6 was extended over it to Long Beach, California (it was subsequently truncated to Bishop, California in 1964). Therefore, US 138 still meets its former parent route's path.

== Route description ==
=== Colorado ===
U.S. 138 begins in Sterling at U.S. 6 and Business Loop 76. It goes northeast and intersects Colorado State Highway 113 southwest of Iliff. It becomes more easterly as it goes through Iliff, Proctor and Crook, where it intersects Colorado State Highway 55. It continues on to Sedgwick, where it meets Colorado State Highway 59. After passing through Ovid, it then meets U.S. Highway 385 west of Julesburg, and they overlap into Julesburg. Also in Julesburg, U.S. 138 intersects Colorado State Highway 11. U.S. 138 then leaves Julesburg going northeast and enters Nebraska.

=== Nebraska ===
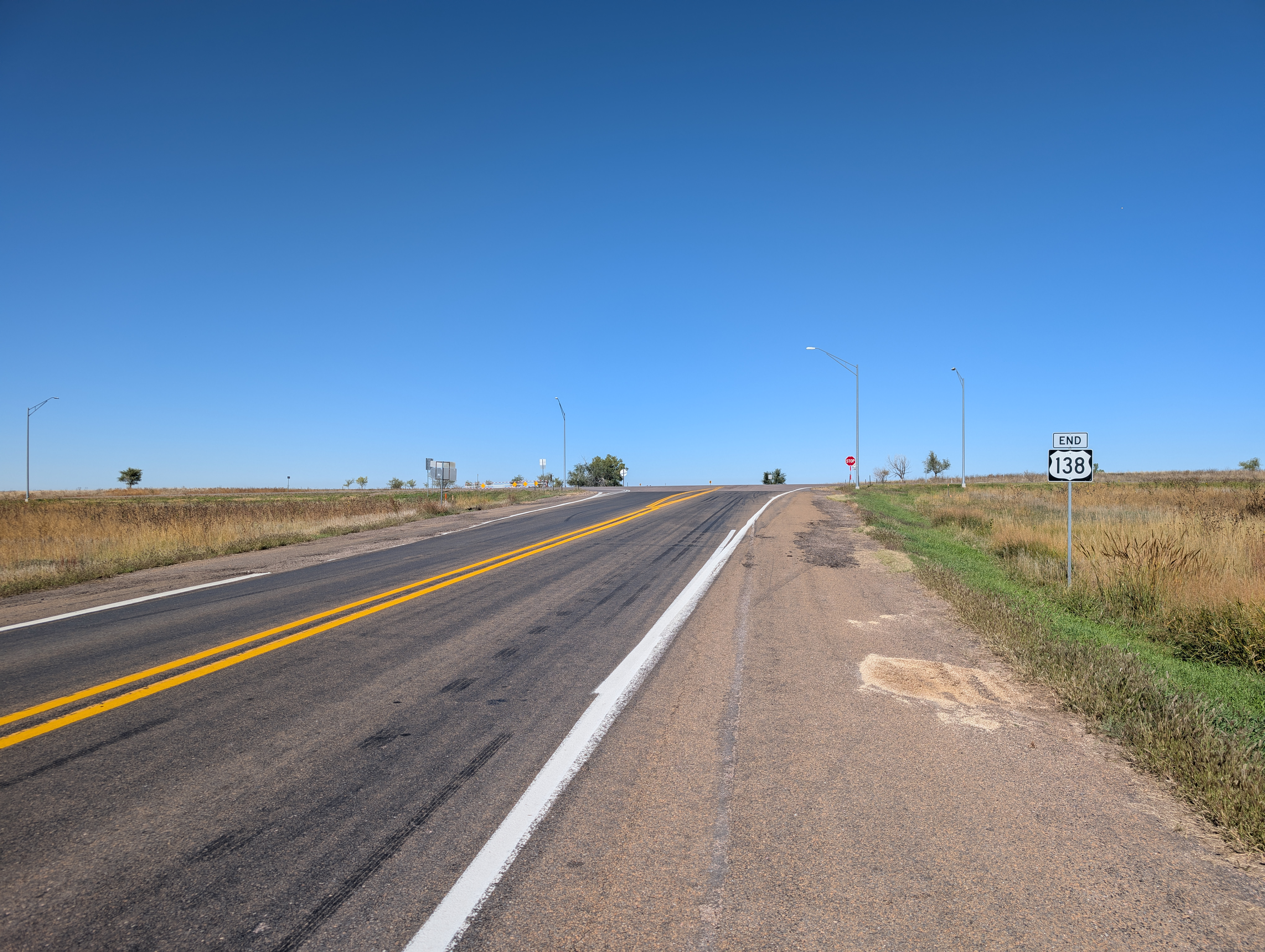
The eastern terminus of U.S. highway 138 at U.S. 30 in Nebraska.

Shortly after entering Nebraska, U.S. 138 intersects Interstate 80. It continues east from I-80 and enters Big Springs. At Big Springs, U.S. 138 turns north and ends at U.S. Highway 30.

== History ==
The western terminus is in Sterling, Colorado, where it met U.S. Route 38 from 1926 to 1931 (US 38 became U.S. Route 6); the eastern terminus is at U.S. Route 30 north of Big Springs, Nebraska. US 138 is an example of a "child" route that has long outlived its "parent"; before U.S. Route 99 was decommissioned in 1964, US 138 was the only US route to not have a "parent" route.

== Major intersections ==
State	County	Location	mi	km	Destinations	Notes
Colorado	Logan	Sterling	0.000	0.000	SH 14 west (Chestnut Street) / US 6 to I-76 – Holyoke, Atwood, Brush, Fort Collins	Western terminus; eastern terminus of SH 14; highway continues as US 6 west (3rd Street south)
Colorado	Logan	Sterling	0.000	0.000	Front Street	Interchange; eastbound entrance only
Colorado	Logan		8.970	14.436	SH 113 north – Peetz, Sidney	Southern terminus of SH 113
Colorado	Logan	Crook	27.503	44.262	SH 55 south – Fleming	Northern terminus of SH 55
Colorado	Sedgwick	Sedgwick	43.413	69.866	SH 59 south – Haxtun, Yuma	Northern terminus of SH 59
Colorado	Sedgwick		54.810	88.208	US 385 north – Chappell, Sidney	West end of US 385 overlap
Colorado	Sedgwick	Julesburg	56.956	91.662	SH 11 north to I-80	Southern terminus of SH 11
Colorado	Sedgwick	Julesburg	58.534	94.201	US 385 south to I-76 – Holyoke	Interchange; east end of US 385 overlap
			59.823 0.00	96.276 0.00	Colorado–Nebraska line	
Nebraska	Deuel		3.06– 3.51	4.92– 5.65	I-80 – Sidney, North Platte	Partial cloverleaf interchange; exit 101 on I-80
Nebraska	Deuel	Big Springs	9.44	15.19	L-25B to I-80	Northern terminus of L-25B
Nebraska	Deuel		11.47	18.46	US 30 – Ogallala, Chappell	Eastern terminus
Nebraska	Deuel		11.47	18.46	Road 207 – Lewellen	Continuation beyond eastern terminus
1.000 mi = 1.609 km; 1.000 km = 0.621 mi: Concurrency terminus; Incomplete access

Browse numbered routes
← SH 136	CO	→ SH 139
← N-137	NE	→ US 159
