= Colorado State Highway 55 =

State highway in Colorado, United States

State Highway 55
- SH 55 highlighted in red

Route information
- Maintained by CDOT
- Length: 5.659 mi (9.107 km)

Major junctions
- South end: CR 81 near Fleming
- I-76 near Crook
- North end: US 138 in Crook

Location
- Country: United States
- State: Colorado
- Counties: Logan

Highway system
- Colorado State Highway System; Interstate; US; State; Scenic
← SH 53	→ SH 56
← I-25	SH 25	→ SH 26

State Highway 55 (SH 55) is a 5.659 mi (9.1 km) long state highway in the U.S. state of Colorado. SH 55's southern terminus is at County Road 81 northeast of Fleming, and the northern terminus is at US 138 in Crook. It serves as a connector between Crook and Interstate 76 (I-76).

== Route description ==
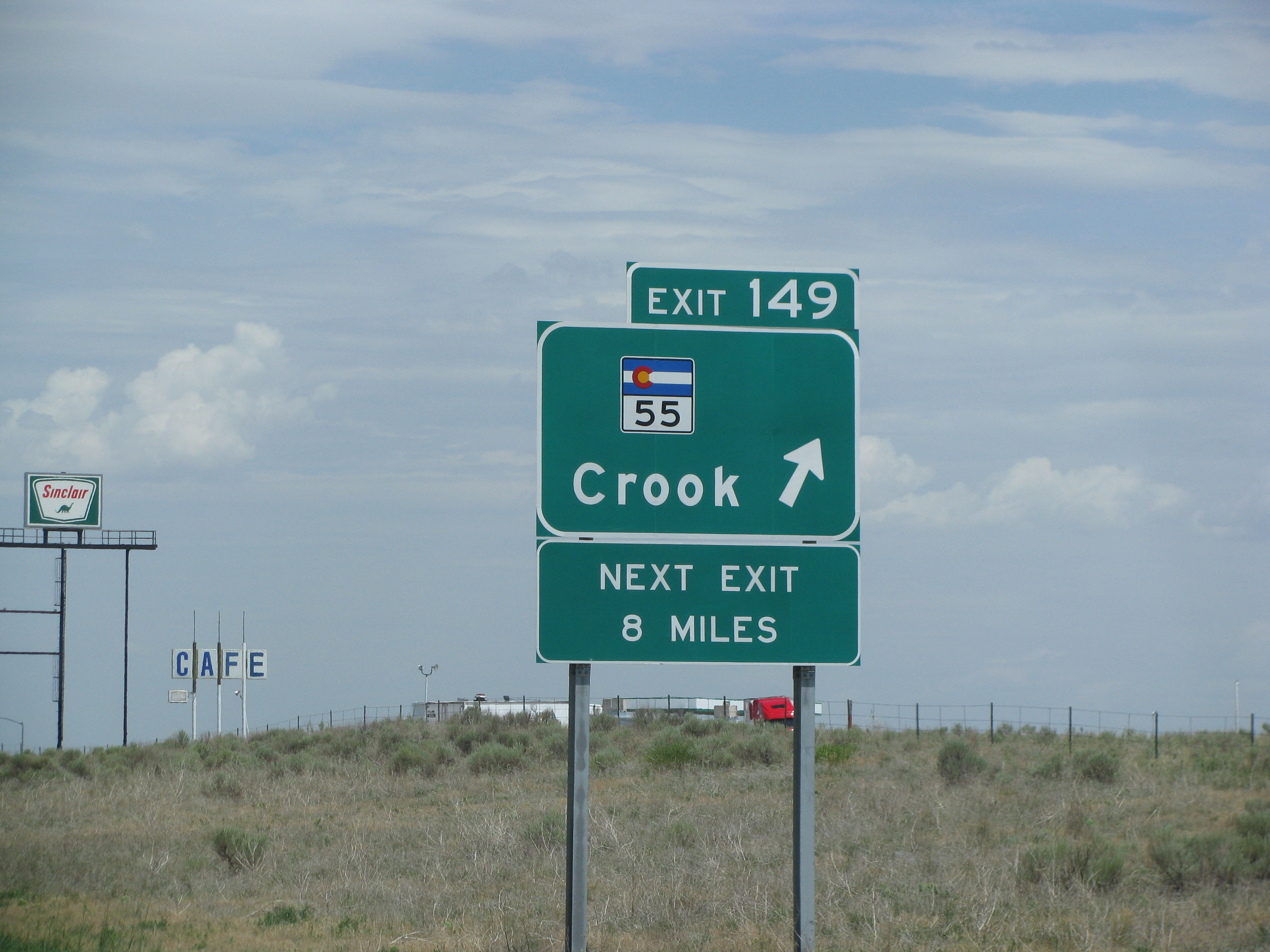
I-76 exit for SH 55

SH 55 runs 5.7 miles (9.2 km), starting at a junction with U.S. Highway 138 in Crook, then south across the South Platte River to I-76. The highway ends at CR 81 northeast of Fleming.

== Major intersections ==
The entire route is in Logan County.

Location	mi	km	Destinations	Notes
Crook	0.000	0.000	US 138 – Sterling, Julesburg	Northern terminus
	2.417	3.890	I-76 – Julesburg, Fort Morgan, Omaha, Denver	I-76 exit 149.
	5.659	9.107	CR 81	Southern terminus
1.000 mi = 1.609 km; 1.000 km = 0.621 mi
