= Colorado State Highway 59 =

State highway in Colorado, United States

State Highway 59
- SH 59 highlighted in red

Route information
- Maintained by CDOT
- Length: 173.337 mi (278.959 km)

Major junctions
- South end: US 40 / US 287 in Kit Carson
- I-70 / US 24 near Seibert; US 36 near Cope; US 34 in Yuma; US 6 in Haxtun; I-76 south of Sedgwick
- North end: US 138 in Sedgwick

Location
- Country: United States
- State: Colorado
- Counties: Cheyenne, Kit Carson, Washington, Yuma, Phillips, Sedgwick

Highway system
- Colorado State Highway System; Interstate; US; State; Scenic
← SH 58	→ SH 60

State Highway 59 (SH 59) is a 173.3-mile-long (278.9 km) state highway in eastern Colorado. SH 59's southern terminus is at U.S. Route 40 (US 40) and US 287 in Kit Carson, and the northern terminus is at US 138 in Sedgwick.

== Route description ==
SH 59 begins in the south at a junction with U.S. Highway 40 in Kit Carson. From there, the road proceeds northward for 41 miles (66 km) before intersecting Interstate 70 at that highway's exit 405 just south of the Seibert city limits. Highway 59 then continues north through Siebert for another 26 miles (42 km) to join with U.S. Highway 36 just east of Cope. From this point, the route runs eastward concurrently with US 36 for nearly eight miles before splitting off northward again approximately two miles west of Joes and heading north for about 33 miles (53 km) to reach a junction with U.S. Highway 34 at Yuma. Continuing northward, the road then travels for another 37 miles (60 km) to Haxtun where the route intersects U.S. Highway 6. From Haxton, Highway 59 travels north for a further 24 miles (39 km) before crossing Interstate 76 at I-76's exit 165 roughly three miles south of Sedgwick. After three more miles the road reaches its northern terminus at a junction with U.S. Highway 138 at Sedgwick near the Nebraska state line. Through nearly its entire length, the road passes through remote, very sparsely populated agricultural areas.

== History ==
The route was established in the 1920s and paved by 1938.

== Major intersections ==
County	Location	mi	km	Destinations	Notes
Cheyenne	Kit Carson	0.000	0.000	US 40 / US 287 – Eads, Cheyenne Wells, Limon	Southern terminus
Kit Carson	Seibert	41.028	66.028	I-70 / US 24 west – Limon, Hays	I-70 exit 405; southern end of unsigned US 24 overlap
Kit Carson	Seibert	41.479	66.754	US 24 east – Vona	Northern end of unsigned US 24 overlap
Washington	Cope	67.142	108.055	US 36 west – Anton	Southern end of US 36 overlap
Yuma		74.478	119.861	US 36 east – Idalia	Northern end of US 36 overlap
Yuma	Yuma	106.291	171.059	US 34 – Wray, Akron	
Phillips	Haxtun	147.259	236.990	US 6 – Holyoke, Sterling	
Sedgwick		171.107	275.370	I-76 – Julesburg, Denver	I-76 exit 165
Sedgwick	Sedgwick	173.337	278.959	US 138 – Julesburg, Sterling	Northern terminus
1.000 mi = 1.609 km; 1.000 km = 0.621 mi: Concurrency terminus
