= U.S. Route 385 in Colorado =

Section of U.S. Highway in Colorado, United States

U.S. Highway 385
- High Plains Highway
- US 385 highlighted in red

Route information
- Maintained by CDOT
- Length: 318.52 mi (512.61 km)
- Existed: 1958–present

Major junctions
- South end: US 287 / US 385 / SH-3 towards Boise City, OK
- US 50 / US 287 in Lamar; US 50 / US 400 in Granada; US 40 in Cheyenne Wells; I-70 in Burlington; US 34 in Wray; I-76 in Julesburg
- North end: US 385 towards Chappell, NE

Location
- Country: United States
- State: Colorado
- Counties: Baca, Prowers, Kiowa, Cheyenne, Kit Carson, Yuma, Phillips, Sedgwick

Highway system
- United States Numbered Highway System; List; Special; Divided; Colorado State Highway System; Interstate; US; State; Scenic
← SH 371	→ SH 389

U.S. Highway 385 (US 385), also known as the High Plains Highway north of Cheyenne Wells, is the easternmost significant north–south state highway in the U.S. state of Colorado, and many of the state's major east–west routes intersect with US 385 before crossing into neighboring Kansas and Nebraska. It enters the state from Oklahoma while overlapped with US 287, but splits at Lamar to follow its own route through the Eastern Plains to Nebraska.

== Route description ==
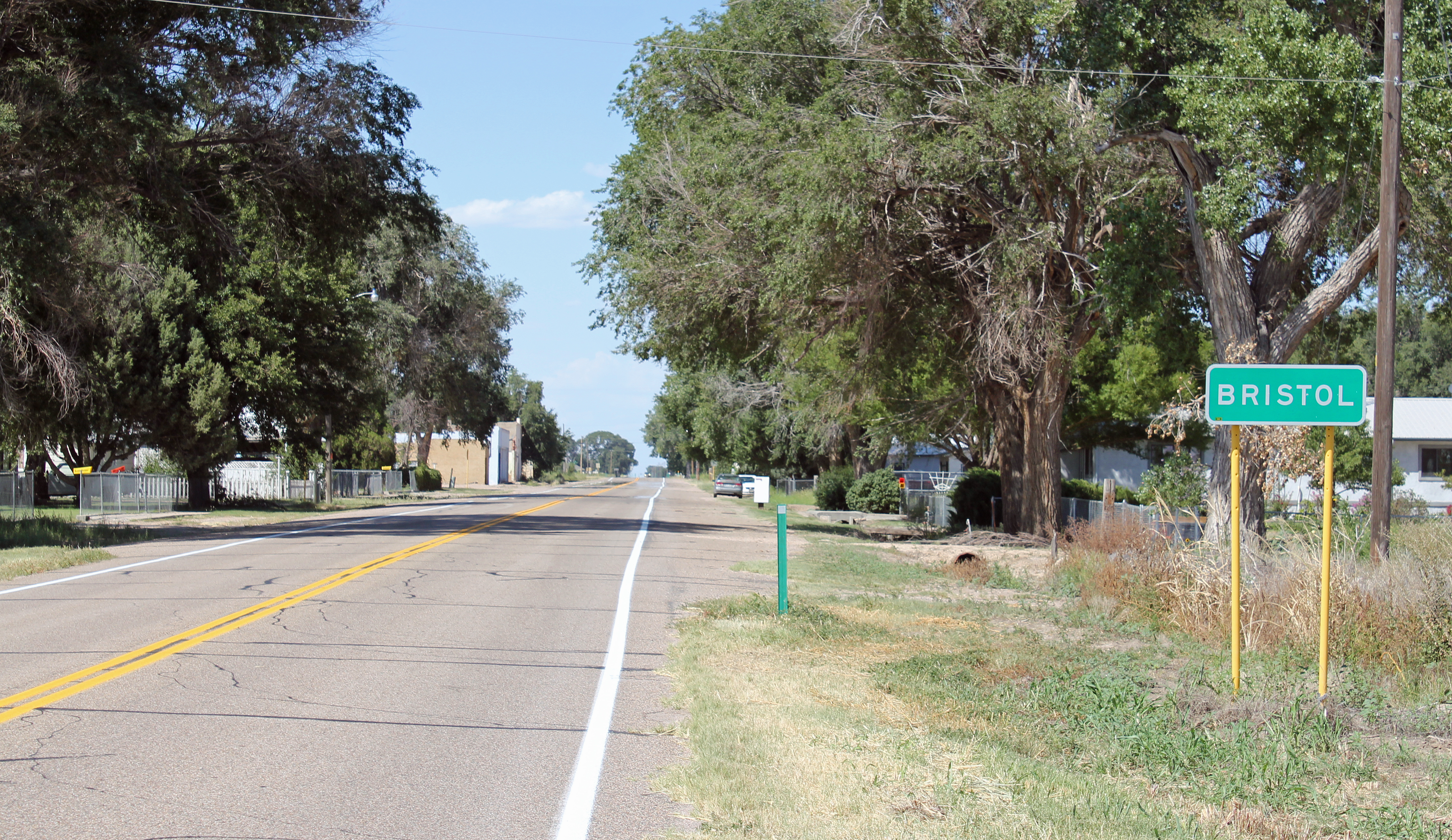
View of US 385 entering Bristol

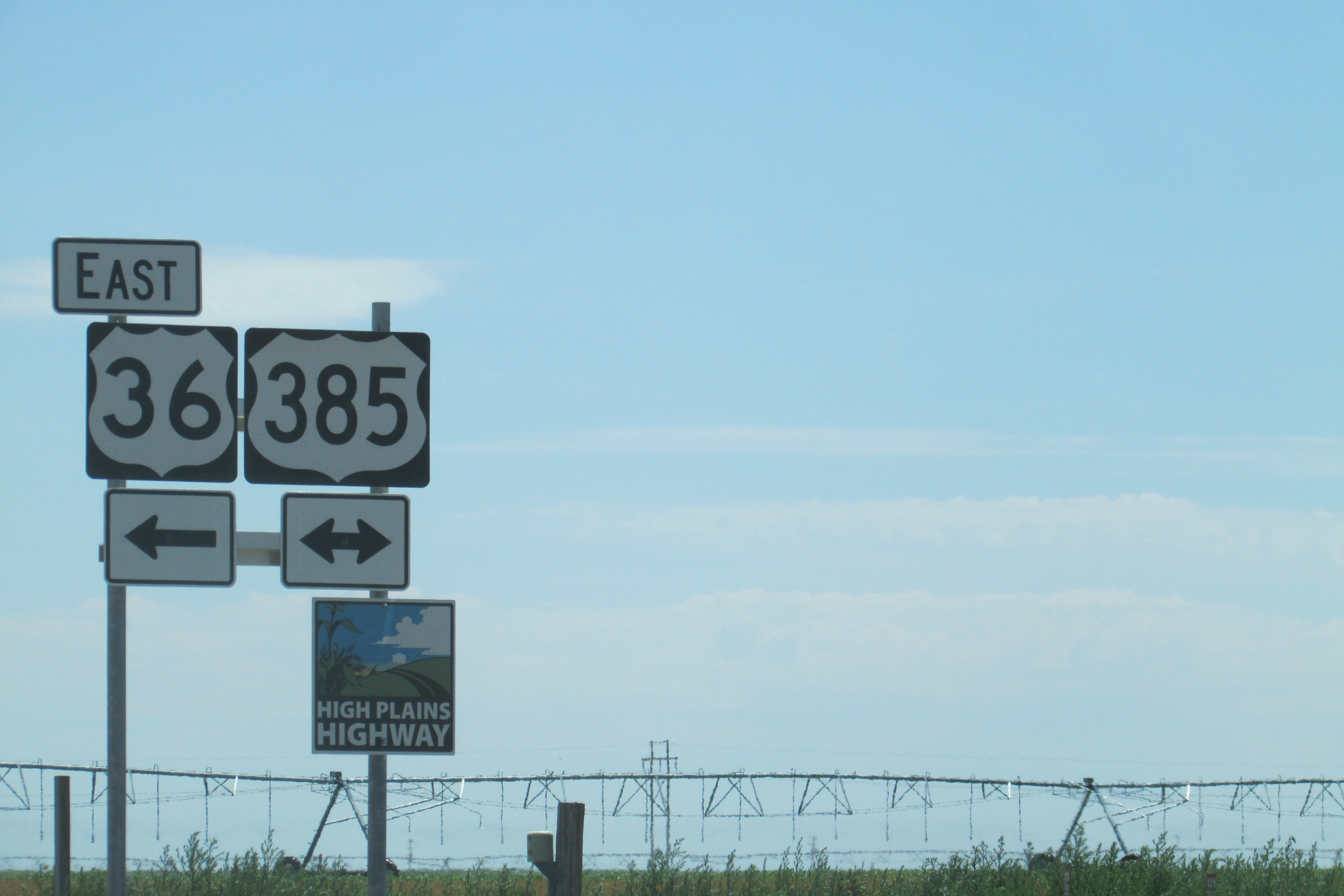
View of US 385 at the southern end of the US 36 concurrency

US 385 is almost entirely a rural two-lane route. It begins at the Oklahoma state line on an overlap with US 287 (and at the west end of Oklahoma State Highway 3) and follows US 287 north through Campo and Springfield to Lamar. In that city it turns east with US 50 through Carlton to Granada, where the route turns north and finally separates from others. Communities along the route include Bristol, Sheridan Lake, Cheyenne Wells, Burlington, Wray, Holyoke, and Julesburg. US 385 turns west with US 138 in Julesburg, splitting west of the city and running northwest to the Nebraska state line.

== History ==
The corridor along the eastern tier of Colorado was defined as several secondary highways in the 1910s. By 1914, the following were present: Secondary Road No. 2S from Oklahoma north to Holly, No. 9S from Cheyenne Wells north to Burlington, and No. 6S from Burlington north to Wray. No. 24S from Wray north to Julesburg and No. 25S south from Granada were added by 1916, and by 1919 the corridor had been completed with the extension of No. 9S south to near Granada and the connection of No. 25S to No. 2S via No. 33S east of Two Buttes. As part of a renumbering in 1923, State Highway 51 (SH 51) was assigned to the route, with one major difference: SH 51 did not follow No. 2S (which mostly became SH 89), but instead went southeast from Two Buttes to Stonington and continued by replacing No. 30S (Dallas-Canadian-Denver Highway) to the Kansas state line in the direction of Guymon, Oklahoma. (The connection in Kansas would become K-51 several years later, but the rest of the road to US 64 west of Guymon did not become Oklahoma State Highway 95 until 1953–1954.)

In 1932–1934 a short extension from Julesburg north to Nebraska (mostly via present SH 11) was added to the route, taking it from border to border. At the same time, a new State Highway 166 (SH 166) was created, paralleling the Union Pacific Railroad's Overland Route from US 138 west of Julesburg northwesterly to the Nebraska line (where it connected with Nebraska Highway 27). SH 51 spent its early days as an unpaved road, except from Granada north to Road KK near Bristol, which received "oil process surfacing" in 1931–1932 when it was still part of US 50. Otherwise, paving was begun in 1941–1942 between Holyoke and Julesburg, and was completed north of Cheyenne Wells in 1957–1958. Several major realignments were made prior to paving. US 385 was realigned north of Wray in 1937–1939, leaving behind two separate sections of County Road FF and Roads 43 and 10 returning to current US 385 south of Holyoke. Soon thereafter, in 1939–1940, US 395 was realigned to bypass Idalia and Vernon to the east, leaving behind Road 9 to Idalia (now part of US 36), Roads DD and CC between Idalia and Vernon, and Road 26 back east to current US 385. In 1953 the state got rid of a large number of state highways, including the short extension of SH 51 north of Julesburg (still unpaved), all of SH 166 (also unpaved), and the entire length of SH 51 south of Granada. Except for 7 miles (11 km) of SH 116 east of Two Buttes, this was given back to the counties, and is now Roads M, 49, X, and 44 from Kansas (where K-51 still exists) to Walsh, Road 45 from Walsh to SH 116, and Roads 38, 21, N, 22, R, and 25 from SH 116 to Granada. All of these roads remain unpaved with the exception of 6 miles (9.7 km) of Road 44 south of Walsh.

US 385 was created nationally in 1958–1959. In Colorado it followed US 287 from Oklahoma to Kit Carson, US 40 east to Cheyenne Wells, SH 51 to Julesburg, and former SH 166 (paved in 1959–1960) was returned to the state highway system for the final bit into Nebraska. The remaining independent section of SH 51 was paved over the next few years and completed in 1963–1964, at which time US 385 was moved off US 287 north of Lamar. SH 51 was dropped along with other redundant state highway designations in late 1968.

In the Eastern Colorado Mobility Study (2002) the Colorado Department of Transportation (CDOT) identified US 385 as a potential connection between the Ports-to-Plains Corridor (US 287) and Heartland Expressway (SH 71 and US 385 in Nebraska). In 2004 the Colorado General Assembly defined the High Plains Highway as that part of US 385 from Cheyenne Wells north to Nebraska, along with US 40 connecting US 287 near Kit Carson with Cheyenne Wells. A more detailed study, made in 2007, recommended improving the highway to a "super 2" facility with improved roadway geometry and shoulders. Signs marking the High Plains Highway were posted in 2009.

== Major intersections ==
County	Location	mi	km	Destinations	Notes
Baca		0.000	0.000	US 287 south / US 385 south / SH-3 east – Boise City OK	Oklahoma state line
Baca		28.777	46.312	US 160 – Trinidad, Johnson KS	
Baca		40.772	65.616	SH 116 – Two Buttes	
Prowers	Lamar	77.639 435.390	124.948 700.692	US 50 west / US 287 north (Main Street) – La Junta, Eads	Northern end of US 287 overlap; southern end of US 50 overlap
Prowers	Granada	452.769 95.000	728.661 152.888	US 50 east / US 400 east (Goff Street) – Holly	Northern end of US 50 overlap
Prowers		98.628	158.726	Road KK	Former SH 196
Kiowa		122.879	197.755	SH 96 west – Eads	Southern end of SH 96 overlap
Kiowa	Sheridan Lake	123.682	199.047	SH 96 east – Towner	Northern end of SH 96 overlap
Cheyenne		149.701	240.920	US 40 east – Sharon Springs	Southern end of US 40 overlap
Cheyenne	Cheyenne Wells	150.251	241.806	US 40 west – Kit Carson	Northern end of US 40 overlap
Kit Carson	Burlington	187.411	301.609	I-70 – Denver, Topeka	I-70 exit 437.
Kit Carson	Burlington	187.886	302.373	US 24 west (Rose Avenue)	Southern end of US 24 overlap
Kit Carson	Burlington	188.855	303.933	US 24 east (Rose Avenue)	Northern end of US 24 overlap
Yuma		216.861	349.004	US 36 west – Idalia, Denver	Southern end of US 36 overlap
Yuma		219.448	353.167	US 36 east – St. Francis	Northern end of US 36 overlap
Yuma	Wray	243.345	391.626	US 34 (3rd Street)	
Phillips	Holyoke	279.424	449.689	US 6 (Denver Street)	
Phillips	Holyoke	279.893	450.444	SH 23 – Venango, Amherst	
Sedgwick		294.617	474.140	County Road 4 – Venango	Former SH 148
Sedgwick	Julesburg	309.158	497.542	I-76 – Sterling, Ogallala	I-76 exit 180.
Sedgwick	Julesburg	310.996 58.534	500.500 94.201	US 138 east – Big Springs	Southern end of US 138 overlap
Sedgwick	Julesburg	56.956	91.662	SH 11 to I-80	
Sedgwick		54.810 313.849	88.208 505.091	US 138 west – Ovid, Sterling	Northern end of US 138 overlap
Sedgwick		317.631	511.178	US 385 north – Chappell, Sidney	Nebraska state line
1.000 mi = 1.609 km; 1.000 km = 0.621 mi: Concurrency terminus

== See also ==
U.S. Route 385
Previous state: Oklahoma	Colorado	Next state: Nebraska
