= Eastern Colorado =

Region of Colorado, US, east of the Rocky Mountains

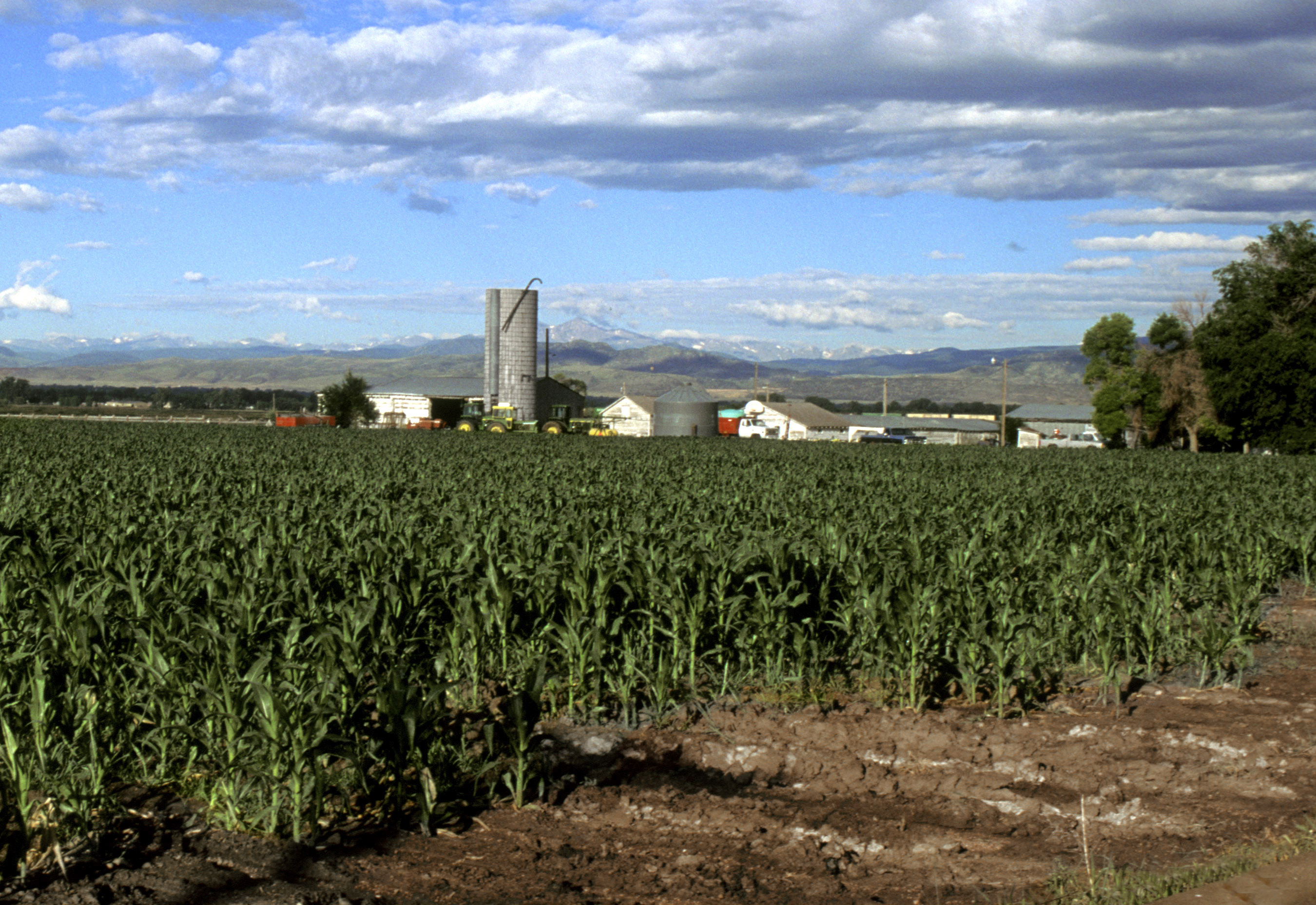
Corn growing in Larimer County

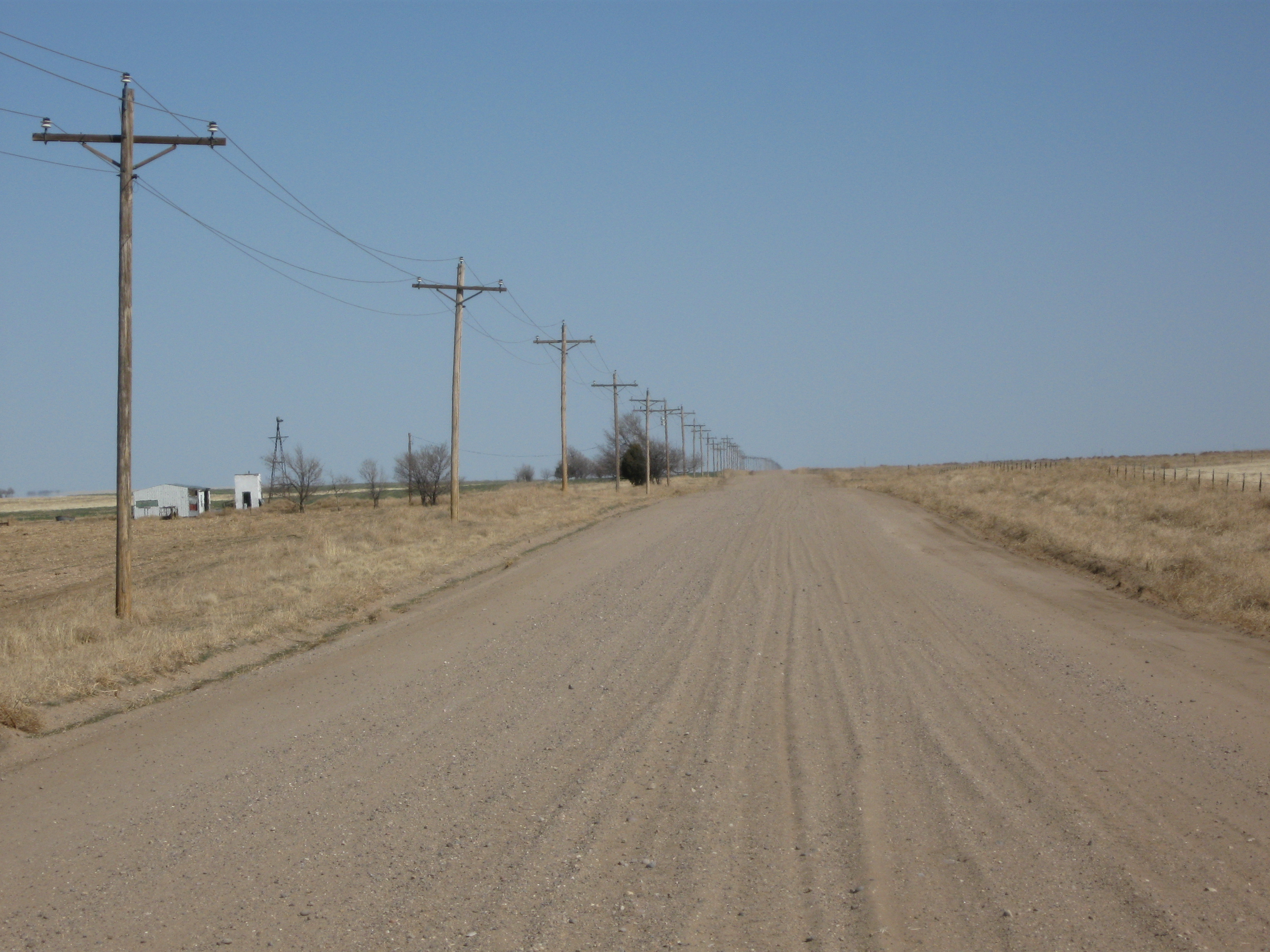
High Plains in Eastern Colorado

The Eastern Plains of Colorado refers to a region of the U.S. state of Colorado east of the Rocky Mountains and east of the population centers of the Front Range.

== Geography ==
Eastern Plains shown on the map of Colorado

The Eastern Plains are part of the High Plains, which are the westernmost portion of the Great Plains. The region is characterized by mostly rolling plains, divided by the South Platte River and Arkansas River valleys. There are also several deciduous forests, canyons, buttes, and a few large natural lakes and rivers throughout the region. The Eastern Plains rise from approximately 3,400 feet (1,000 m.) at the eastern border of Colorado with Kansas, where the Arkansas River leaves the state, to 7,500 feet (2,300 m.) east of the Denver Basin.

Most of the Eastern Plains region lies within Colorado's 4th congressional district.

=== Climate ===
The Eastern Plains have a semi-arid climate and receive little rainfall. Much of the area relies on irrigation to survive. Summers are typically hot and dry, often bringing thunderstorms, which are often severe, to the area, with some occasionally forming landspouts and tornadoes. Eastern Colorado winters are cold and dry, with significant snowfalls and icy conditions. Temperatures can sometimes fall to -40 to -30 degrees Fahrenheit in extreme cold waves, although this is rare.

== History ==
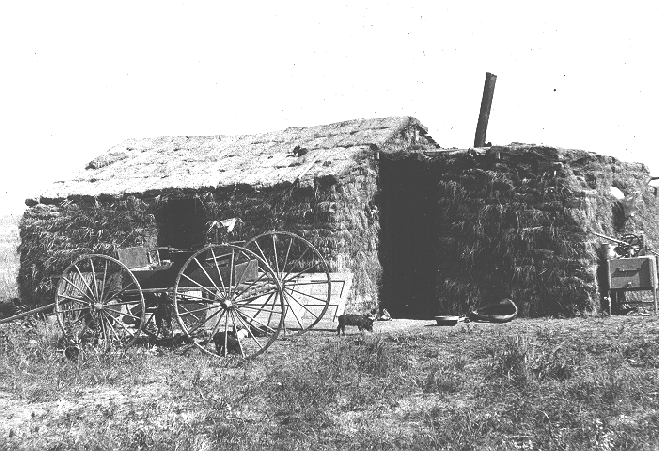
Many of the original European settlers of Eastern Colorado built sod houses where lumber was scarce.

=== Native Americans ===
Eastern Colorado was once home to many Native American tribes. The Plains Indians that lived in the region included the Arapahoe, Cheyenne, Kiowa, Pawnee, and Sioux. The Ute people formally ruled all over central and western Colorado, and onto the eastern plains as well. The Comanche once ruled all over southeastern Colorado, and the Jicarilla Apache ruled in southeastern Colorado as well.

=== Settlement ===
In 1541, the Spanish came to the area now known as the south eastern portion of Colorado, in search of gold after hearing rumors in Mexico city. Not having found any gold, the Spanish largely left the area untouched. During the late 17th and 18th century Spain and France claimed southeastern Colorado. However, nobody settled the land. In 1803 the United States gained possession of much of the land east of Rocky Mountains with the Louisiana Purchase.

Zebulon M. Pike was sent by the federal government to lay out the boundary lines of territory in 1806. This expedition investigated the area now known as Colorado Springs. The prominent mountain in the area was named Pike's Peak after Pike, the leading commander of the exploration. There were multiple expeditions sent to lay out and explore the territory throughout the early 1800s. This created multiple trading posts with fur trades attracting many backcountry adventurers. There was still no permanent settlement created until after the conclusion of the Mexican War in 1848. San Luis was founded on the Culebra River in 1851. Spanish-speaking settlers who had moved north from New Mexico founded it. San Luis was shortly followed by settlements of San Pedro, San Acacio and Guadalupe.

=== Population ===
The Eastern Colorado plains are among the most sparsely populated areas in the continental United States. Some of the region, with the exception of comparatively urban areas like Sterling, is experiencing depopulation, which in some areas began with the influenza pandemic of 1918 and agricultural price collapses after World War I. The Dust Bowl devastated the region and further accelerated this outmigration, with people migrating to Denver. Baca County is emblematic of the population decline and its associated effects, as the county's population declined in every census from 1960 to 2020.

== Protected areas ==
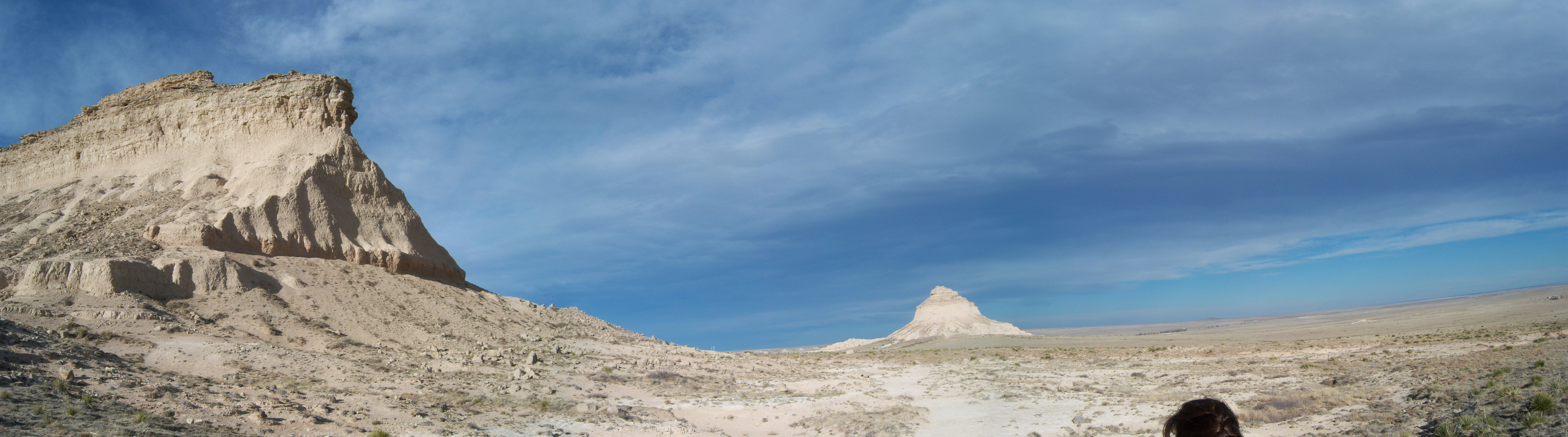
The Pawnee Buttes, located in the Pawnee National Grassland on the high plains in Northeastern Colorado

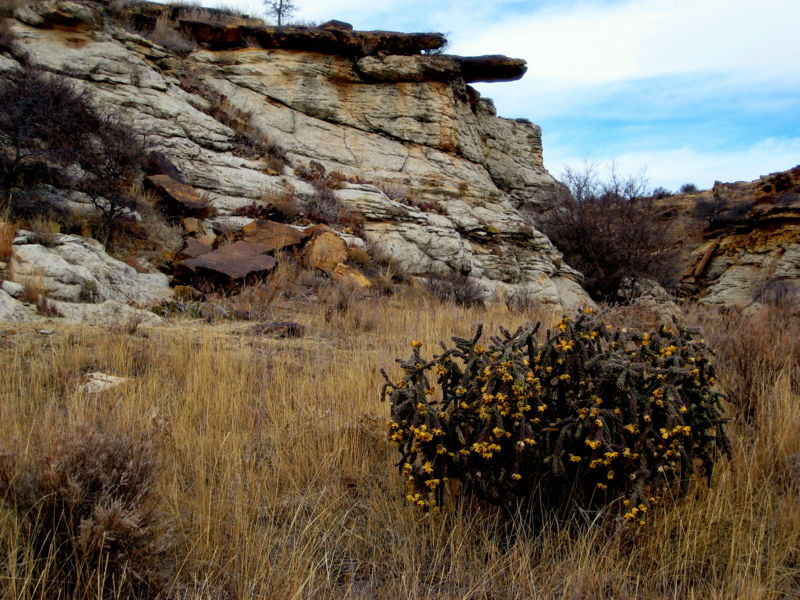
Picture Canyon, located in the Comanche National Grassland, is typical of the scattered canyons found on the high plains in Eastern Colorado, Eastern New Mexico, West Texas, and the Oklahoma panhandle.

Both the Pawnee National Grasslands and Comanche National Grasslands are located in the Eastern Plains. They are composed of marginal farmlands that were withdrawn from agriculture and consolidated under federal control beginning in the Dust Bowl.

The Amache National Historic Site, located near Granada in Prowers County is administered by the National Park Service.

== Agriculture ==
Eastern Colorado is largely farmland, with many small farming communities. The major cash crops are corn, wheat, hay, oats, and soybeans. There is also significant livestock farming, dairy and poultry farming, including chicken for meat and eggs, and turkey farming. Most of the towns in the region have grain elevators and prominent water towers. Also, over 90% of the farms in Eastern Colorado are family farms.

== Education ==
In Eastern Colorado most small towns have their own schools and sports teams, but in some parts where depopulation has been the worst, a single school is shared among surrounding towns. There are also a number of schools serving students in grades K–12 run by religious groups or public school districts. Eastern Colorado is one of the few remaining places in the United States that was still operating one-room school houses in 2010.

Eastern Colorado is home to several institutions of higher education, primarily community colleges:

- Morgan Community College (Fort Morgan)
- Northeastern Junior College (Sterling)
- Lamar Community College (Lamar)
- Otero College (La Junta)

== Transportation ==
Eastern Colorado roads span the gamut from paved roads to gravel roads to dirt roads. The unpaved roads are typically county or local roads that do not receive enough traffic to be paved. Some of the major paved roads include:

- Interstate 76
- Interstate 70
- U.S. Highway 6
- U.S. Highway 24
- U.S. Highway 36
- U.S. Highway 40
- U.S. Highway 50
- U.S. Highway 160
- U.S. Highway 287
- U.S. Highway 350
- U.S. Highway 385
- State Highway 10
- State Highway 11
- State Highway 36
- State Highway 59
- State Highway 71
- State Highway 86
- State Highway 94
- State Highway 96

== See also ==
- Buffalo Commons
- Kent Haruf, novelist whose books were set on the Eastern Plains
- Shortgrass prairie
