= KRFD (FM) =

- Fleming, Colorado; United States
- Broadcast area: Sterling, Colorado
- Frequency: 100.1 MHz

Programming
- Language: English
- Format: Christian Contemporary
- Affiliations: K-LOVE

Ownership
- Owner: Alexander and Christine Creighton; (Northeast Colorado Broadcasting, LLC)

History
- Former call signs: KMAP (2008–2012); KSIK (2012–2014); KCGC (2014–2015)
- Former frequencies: 95.9 FM (2008–2012)

Technical information
- Licensing authority: FCC
- Facility ID: 170959
- Class: C2
- ERP: 50,000 watts
- HAAT: 150 meters (490 ft)
- Transmitter coordinates: 40°34′57″N 103°01′56″W

Links
- Public license information: Public file; LMS
- Website: klove.com

KRFD (100.1 FM) is an American radio station licensed to serve Fleming, Colorado, United States. The station is owned by Alexander and Christine Creighton, through licensee Northeast Colorado Broadcasting, LLC.

== Programming ==
KRFD broadcasts a Christian contemporary format, including programming from the K-LOVE radio network, to the Sterling Micropolitan Statistical Area.

== History ==
In July 2007, Kona Coast Radio applied to the Federal Communications Commission (FCC) for a construction permit for a new broadcast radio station to serve Arriba, Colorado. The FCC granted this permit on November 4, 2008, with a scheduled expiration date of November 4, 2011. The new station was assigned call sign "KMAP" on December 12, 2008. In March 2010, the FCC authorized a change in community of license to Fleming, Colorado.

After construction and testing were completed in November 2011, the station applied for its broadcast license. As of July 1, 2012, the FCC has accepted the application for filing but taken no further definitive action.

Just days after the station's license application was accepted, Kona Coast Radio applied to the FCC for a new construction permit to change the station's broadcast frequency from 95.9 to 92.9 MHz to resolve issues with another station under construction. The Commission granted KMAP the new permit on December 12, 2011, with a scheduled December 12, 2014, expiration date.

In April 2012, Kona Coast Radio reached an agreement to sell the KMAP permit and certain station assets to Fireside Radio, LLC, for a total of $5,000. The FCC accepted the application to transfer the construction permit on May 24, 2012, and the transfer was consummated on October 8, 2012.

On November 19, 2012, the station was issued its license to cover. On November 22, 2012, the station's call sign was changed to KSIK. The station's call sign was changed to KCGC on December 31, 2014, coincident with Fireside Radio's sale of the station to Northeast Colorado Broadcasting, LLC for $50,000.

The call sign was again changed on February 5, 2015, to the current KRFD.

As of December 1, 2020, the station was no longer broadcasting and was considered silent.
