= Bristol, Colorado =

Unincorporated community in Prowers County, Colorado, United States

- Unincorporated Community
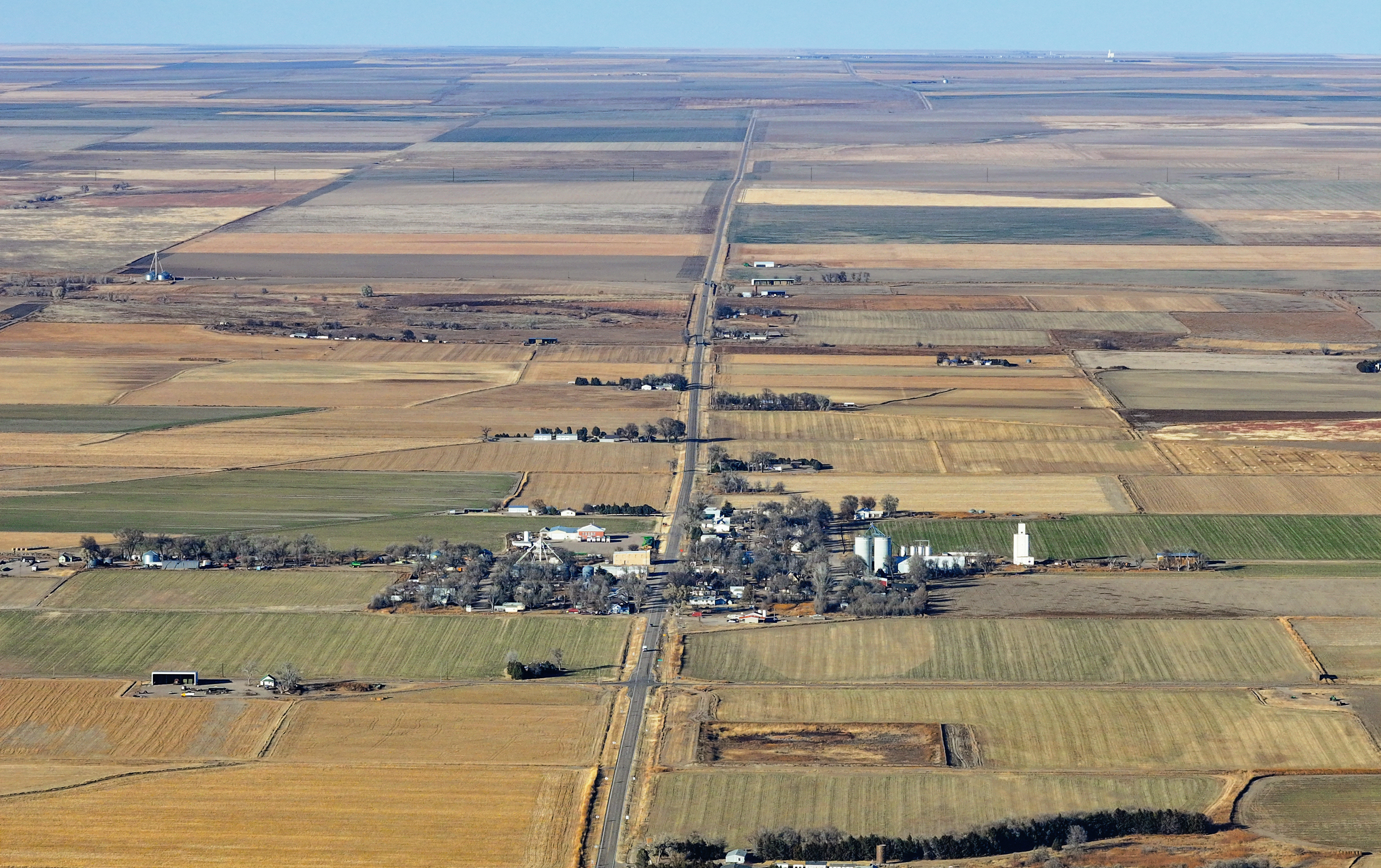
- Aerial view (2023)

- Location of Bristol, Colorado. Bristol (Colorado)
- Coordinates: 38°07′27″N 102°18′40″W
- Country: United States
- State: Colorado
- County: Prowers
- Founded: 1906

Government
  - Type: Unincorporated community
  - Body: Prowers County
- Elevation: 3,560 ft (1,090 m)
- Time zone: UTC−07:00 (MST)
  - Summer (DST): UTC−06:00 (MDT)
- ZIP code: 81047 (Holly)
- Area code: 719
- GNIS pop ID: 203821

Bristol is an unincorporated community in Prowers County, Colorado, United States.

== History ==
Bristol was established in 1906. The community was named after C. H. Bristol, a railroad official. The Bristol, Colorado, post office operated from July 1, 1908, until November 2, 1997. The U.S. post office at Holly, Colorado, (ZIP Code 81047) now serves Bristol postal addresses.

== Geography ==
Bristol is located on U.S. highway route 385 in Prowers County.

== See also ==
- List of populated places in Colorado
- List of post offices in Colorado
