= Sedgwick County, Colorado =

County in Colorado, United States

- County
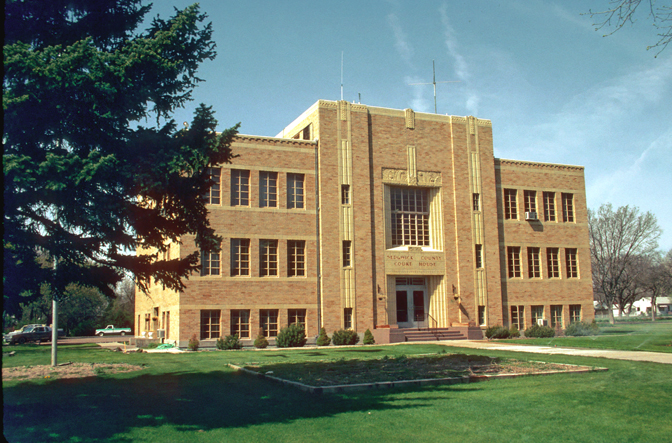
- Sedgwick County Courthouse, Julesburg

- Location within the U.S. state of Colorado
- Coordinates: 40.88°N 102.35°W
- Country: United States
- State: Colorado
- Founded: April 9, 1889
- Named for: John Sedgwick
- Seat: Julesburg
- Largest town: Julesburg

Area
  - Total: 549 sq mi (1,420 km^{2})
  - Land: 548 sq mi (1,420 km^{2})
  - Water: 1.4 sq mi (3.6 km^{2}) 0.2%

Population (2020)
  - Total: 2,404
  - Estimate (2025): 2,247 ▼
  - Density: 4.39/sq mi (1.69/km^{2})
- Time zone: UTC−7 (Mountain)
  - Summer (DST): UTC−6 (MDT)
- Congressional district: 4th
- Website: sedgwickcounty.colorado.gov

Sedgwick County is a county located in the U.S. state of Colorado. As of the 2020 census, the population was 2,404. The county seat is Julesburg. The county was named for Fort Sedgwick, a military post along the Platte Trail, which was named for General John Sedgwick. It is located at the state border with Nebraska.

== History ==
Sedgwick County was named after John Sedgwick, who was a major general in the Union Army during the American Civil War.

== Geography ==
According to the U.S. Census Bureau, the county has a total area of 549 square miles (1,420 km^{2}), of which 548 square miles (1,420 km^{2}) is land and 1.4 square miles (3.6 km^{2}) (0.2%) is water.

=== Adjacent counties ===
- Deuel County, Nebraska – north
- Perkins County, Nebraska – east
- Phillips County – south
- Logan County – west
- Cheyenne County, Nebraska – northwest

=== Major highways ===
- Interstate 76
- U.S. Highway 138
- U.S. Highway 385
- State Highway 11
- State Highway 23
- State Highway 59

=== Trails and byways ===
- American Discovery Trail
- First transcontinental railroad
- Pony Express National Historic Trail
- South Platte River Trail Scenic and Historic Byway
- South Platte Trail

Upper Crossing of the California Trail

== Demographics ==
Historical population
Census	Pop.	Note	%±
1890	1,293		—
1900	971		−24.9%
1910	3,061		215.2%
1920	4,207		37.4%
1930	5,580		32.6%
1940	5,294		−5.1%
1950	5,095		−3.8%
1960	4,242		−16.7%
1970	3,405		−19.7%
1980	3,266		−4.1%
1990	2,690		−17.6%
2000	2,747		2.1%
2010	2,379		−13.4%
2020	2,404		1.1%
2025 (est.)	2,247	▼	−6.5%
U.S. Decennial Census; 1790-1960 1900–1990; 1990-2000 2010–2020

=== 2020 census ===
As of the 2020 census, the county had a population of 2,404. Of the residents, 20.1% were under the age of 18 and 27.6% were 65 years of age or older; the median age was 49.6 years. For every 100 females there were 100.7 males, and for every 100 females age 18 and over there were 101.5 males. 0.0% of residents lived in urban areas and 100.0% lived in rural areas.

Sedgwick County, Colorado – Racial and ethnic composition Note: the US Census treats Hispanic/Latino as an ethnic category. This table excludes Latinos from the racial categories and assigns them to a separate category. Hispanics/Latinos may be of any race.
Race / Ethnicity (NH = Non-Hispanic)	Pop 2000	Pop 2010	Pop 2020	% 2000	% 2010	% 2020
White alone (NH)	2,376	2,036	1,934	86.49%	85.58%	80.45%
Black or African American alone (NH)	9	7	3	0.33%	0.29%	0.12%
Native American or Alaska Native alone (NH)	3	8	10	0.11%	0.34%	0.42%
Asian alone (NH)	19	17	12	0.69%	0.71%	0.50%
Pacific Islander alone (NH)	2	0	0	0.07%	0.00%	0.00%
Other race alone (NH)	0	1	8	0.00%	0.04%	0.33%
Mixed race or Multiracial (NH)	24	21	74	0.87%	0.88%	3.08%
Hispanic or Latino (any race)	314	289	363	11.43%	12.15%	15.10%
Total	2,747	2,379	2,404	100.00%	100.00%	100.00%

The racial makeup of the county was 85.8% White, 0.2% Black or African American, 0.8% American Indian and Alaska Native, 0.5% Asian, 0.0% Native Hawaiian and Pacific Islander, 5.0% from some other race, and 7.7% from two or more races. Hispanic or Latino residents of any race comprised 15.1% of the population.

There were 1,086 households in the county, of which 24.0% had children under the age of 18 living with them and 24.4% had a female householder with no spouse or partner present. About 32.6% of all households were made up of individuals and 16.7% had someone living alone who was 65 years of age or older.

There were 1,343 housing units, of which 19.1% were vacant. Among occupied housing units, 68.9% were owner-occupied and 31.1% were renter-occupied. The homeowner vacancy rate was 1.8% and the rental vacancy rate was 9.8%.

=== 2000 census ===
At the 2000 census there were 2,747 people in 1,165 households, including 802 families, in the county. The population density was 5 people per square mile (1.9 people/km^{2}). There were 1,387 housing units at an average density of 2 units per square mile (0.77 units/km^{2}). The racial makeup of the county was 90.50% White, 0.51% Black or African American, 0.15% Native American, 0.76% Asian, 0.07% Pacific Islander, 5.97% from other races, and 2.04% from two or more races. 11.43% of the population were Hispanic or Latino of any race. Of the 1,165 households 26.40% had children under the age of 18 living with them, 59.10% were married couples living together, 6.60% had a female householder with no husband present, and 31.10% were non-families. 29.40% of households were one person and 13.60% were one person aged 65 or older. The average household size was 2.31 and the average family size was 2.83.

The age distribution was 22.80% under the age of 18, 6.60% from 18 to 24, 23.50% from 25 to 44, 25.00% from 45 to 64, and 22.10% 65 or older. The median age was 43 years. For every 100 females there were 100.10 males. For every 100 females age 18 and over, there were 97.20 males.

The median household income was $28,278 and the median family income was $33,953. Males had a median income of $25,463 versus $16,392 for females. The per capita income for the county was $16,125. About 7.80% of families and 10.00% of the population were below the poverty line, including 13.70% of those under age 18 and 4.20% of those age 65 or over.

== Politics ==
Sedgwick County has been strongly Republican for most of its history. It was the only Colorado county to vote for Charles Evans Hughes in 1916 and one of only two carried by Theodore Roosevelt in 1912, while only three Democratic presidential candidates – William Jennings Bryan in the “free silver” 1896 election plus Franklin D. Roosevelt and Lyndon Johnson in the 1932, 1936 and 1964 landslide wins – have ever carried the county, which has voted for the same candidate as the state of South Dakota in every election since its formation.

United States presidential election results for Sedgwick County, Colorado
Year	Republican		Democratic		Third party(ies)	
Year	No.	%	No.	%	No.	%
1892	198	35.29%	0	0.00%	363	64.71%
1896	130	36.62%	216	60.85%	9	2.54%
1900	256	58.18%	163	37.05%	21	4.77%
1904	347	69.82%	131	26.36%	19	3.82%
1908	544	64.30%	278	32.86%	24	2.84%
1912	328	29.68%	338	30.59%	439	39.73%
1916	529	46.86%	519	45.97%	81	7.17%
1920	819	65.31%	372	29.67%	63	5.02%
1924	779	51.97%	372	24.82%	348	23.22%
1928	1,247	67.51%	580	31.40%	20	1.08%
1932	884	39.10%	1,288	56.97%	89	3.94%
1936	977	40.57%	1,358	56.40%	73	3.03%
1940	1,448	59.86%	959	39.64%	12	0.50%
1944	1,228	68.26%	568	31.57%	3	0.17%
1948	1,020	54.63%	834	44.67%	13	0.70%
1952	1,528	68.74%	686	30.86%	9	0.40%
1956	1,334	63.55%	760	36.21%	5	0.24%
1960	1,230	61.41%	769	38.39%	4	0.20%
1964	895	48.67%	942	51.22%	2	0.11%
1968	1,007	60.92%	546	33.03%	100	6.05%
1972	1,129	67.85%	485	29.15%	50	3.00%
1976	902	53.06%	773	45.47%	25	1.47%
1980	1,151	67.39%	438	25.64%	119	6.97%
1984	1,146	72.39%	429	27.10%	8	0.51%
1988	921	59.61%	611	39.55%	13	0.84%
1992	447	39.01%	397	34.64%	302	26.35%
1996	715	52.69%	519	38.25%	123	9.06%
2000	877	67.31%	384	29.47%	42	3.22%
2004	971	71.40%	374	27.50%	15	1.10%
2008	857	63.43%	468	34.64%	26	1.92%
2012	881	65.84%	419	31.32%	38	2.84%
2016	1,015	74.41%	267	19.57%	82	6.01%
2020	1,121	77.52%	301	20.82%	24	1.66%
2024	1,048	77.17%	283	20.84%	27	1.99%

United States Senate election results for Sedgwick County, Colorado2
Year	Republican		Democratic		Third party(ies)	
Year	No.	%	No.	%	No.	%
2020	1,103	76.23%	320	22.11%	24	1.66%

United States Senate election results for Sedgwick County, Colorado3
Year	Republican		Democratic		Third party(ies)	
Year	No.	%	No.	%	No.	%
2022	807	69.45%	308	26.51%	47	4.04%

Colorado Gubernatorial election results for Sedgwick County
Year	Republican		Democratic		Third party(ies)	
Year	No.	%	No.	%	No.	%
2022	807	69.45%	312	26.85%	43	3.70%

== Communities ==
=== Towns ===
- Julesburg
- Ovid
- Sedgwick

== See also ==
- Bibliography of Colorado
- Geography of Colorado
- History of Colorado
  - National Register of Historic Places listings in Sedgwick County, Colorado
- Index of Colorado-related articles
- List of Colorado-related lists
  - List of counties in Colorado
- Outline of Colorado
