= Fort Sedgwick =

- U.S. military post
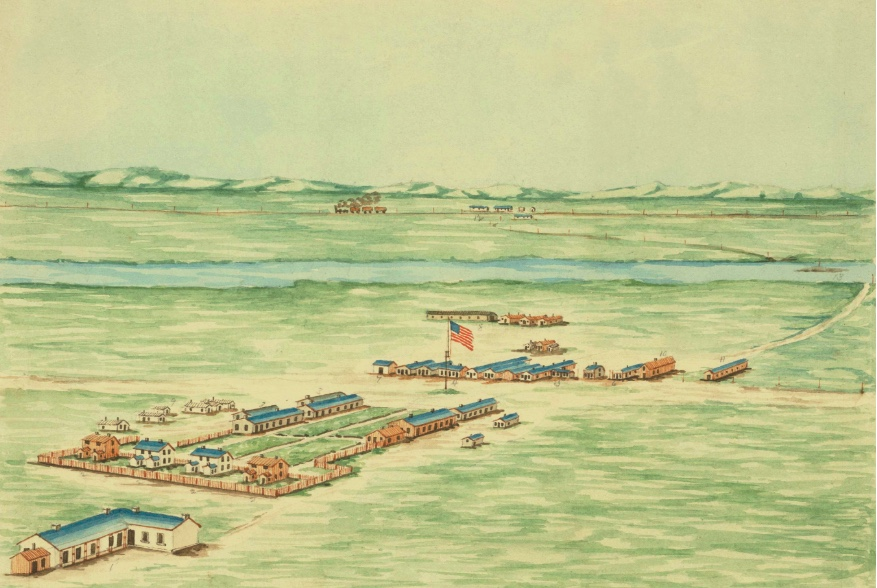
- Anton Schonborn, Fort Sedgwick, 1870
- Nicknames: Post at Julesburg, Camp Rankin, and Fort Rankin
- Site of historic marker for Fort Sedgwick on South Platte Trail Fort Sedgwick (the United States)
- Coordinates: 40°56′20″N 102°22′42″W
- Country: United States
- State: Colorado
- County: Sedgwick
- City: Sedgwick

Fort Sedgwick, also known as Post at Julesburg, Camp Rankin, and Fort Rankin was a U.S. military post from 1864 to 1871, in Sedgwick County, Colorado. There are two historical markers for the former post. The town was named for Fort Sedgwick, which was named after John Sedgwick, who was a major general in the Union Army during the American Civil War.

== History ==
In 1864, there was an increase in skirmishes with Native Americans from the Plains. As a result, in 1864 Camp Rankin was established near Julesburg with a couple of sod huts. It was renamed for an American Civil War hero, Major General John Sedgwick. It grew to a full-blown military installation. By 1866, it had three sets of company quarters, stables, and a corral. The U.S. militia guarded the Overland Stage Route (South Platte Trail), stage stations, and the telegraph line.

Fort Sedgwick was one mile west of Julesburg, south of the South Platte River. The site is now 7.5 miles (12.1 km) southwest of the present Julesburg location. Fort Sedgwick and Julesburg were attacked on January 7, 1865, by about 1,000 Cheyenne and Sioux men in retribution for the Sand Creek massacre (November 29, 1864). At the fort, several Native Americans and some soldiers were killed, and there was so much food looted from Julesburg that it took three days to remove it to their village at Cherry Creek or Sand Creek. There were further attacks in 1865 between Julesburg and Fort Morgan, including burning down the town of Julesburg in February. The town was later rebuilt.

Upon orders by General William Tecumseh Sherman, George Armstrong Custer and six companies of the 7th Cavalry Regiment came to Colorado in June 1867 to stop attacks along the South Platte and Smoky Hill Trails, searching near Fort Sedgwick and part-way to Fort Wallace for Native Americans. A detachment was also sent to Fort Wallace on the Smoky Hill Trail to get supplies. On their return, they were able to defend themselves against an overwhelming force. In the meantime, 35 soldiers deserted upon hearing of newly discovered mines. Custer went in search of a group of men that were delayed in bringing a dispatch from General Sherman to him, and he found the evidence of the Kidder Massacre (June 26, 1867) near the present-day Bird City, Kansas.

Records from the time show that due to the area's lifestyle and the mixture of peacemaking and instigating behaviors by the soldiers, life at the post was a "saga of fraud and corruption, bravery and daring-do…triumph and tragedy…where conditions were considered unlivable, pleasures were few and the nearest bath was the South Platte River." Sedgwick was included in Brevet General James F. Rusling inspection September 1866. He reported to the Quartermaster's Department, "The general character of post buildings was found to be bad, and is believed to be a fruitful source of discontent, desertions. One post inspected had lost 25 men by desertion in one month, with their cavalry horses, accoutrements, Spencer carbines, complete, and many instances of this kind were reported to me. In fact, no humane farmer east would think of sheltering his horses or cattle in such uncomfortable and wretched structures, huts, willow-hurdles, adobe shanties, as compose many of our posts in the new States and Territories now...The cost of wood, on hand was found to vary from $25 per cord at Fort Vancouver, Washington Territory, where timber abounds, to $75 and $100 per cord at Fort Sedgwick, Colorado Territory, where there is not a tree for 50 miles (80.5 km)."

The post was abandoned in May 1871 and the buildings were dismantled. The soldiers at the cemetery were reburied at the Fort McPherson National Cemetery in Nebraska. Fort Sedgwick's history is told at the Fort Sedgwick Museum in Julesburg. In 1940, the Julesburg Historical Society established a monument on the eastern edge of Ovid on Highway 138. It is located 1.25 miles (2 km) north of the site of the fort. A historical marker was established along County Road 28.

== Fictional and dramatic representations ==
In the award-winning 1990 American epic Western film Dances With Wolves, Fort Sedgwick is presented as a deserted military post in 1863 on the western prairie during the American Civil War. The movie was mostly filmed in South Dakota and Wyoming.
