= Colorado State Highway 11 =

State highway in Colorado, United States

State Highway 11
- SH 11 highlighted in red

Route information
- Maintained by CDOT
- Length: 1.35 mi (2.17 km)

Major junctions
- South end: US 138 / US 385 in Julesburg
- North end: Nebraska border towards Oshkosh

Location
- Country: United States
- State: Colorado
- Counties: Sedgwick

Highway system
- Colorado State Highway System; Interstate; US; State; Scenic
← SH 10	→ SH 12

State Highway 11 (SH 11) is a 1.35-mile-long (2.17 km) long north–south state highway in the U.S. state of Colorado. It runs from U.S. Highway 138 (US 138) and US 385 in Julesburg to the Nebraska state line.

== Route description ==
SH 11 begins at an intersection with US 138-385 at the west city limits of Julesburg and proceeds almost directly north to the state line. The road is county-maintained in Nebraska, but becomes Nebraska Highway 27 upon intersecting Interstate 80 (at exit 95). SH 11 thus provides the shortest connection from I-80 to Julesburg, which appears on signs for exit 95.

== History ==
The roadway that SH 11 follows was first added to the state highway system in 1932-1934 as a northerly extension of State Highway 51 (now US 385 south of Julesburg). However, instead of skirting the western edge of Julesburg, SH 51 crossed US 138 on Cedar Street and then zigzagged on Fifth, Sycamore, and Ninth Streets to current SH 11 about 1/2 mile (0.80 km) north of US 138. The state eliminated many state highways in 1953, including this extension of SH 51 north of Julesburg. In 1970-1971 the road was returned to the state highway system as SH 11.

== Major intersections ==
The entire route is in Sedgwick County.

Location	mi	km	Destinations	Notes
	0.000	0.000	US 138 / US 385 to I-80	Southern terminus
	1.350	2.173	Road 187	Continuation beyond Nebraska state line
1.000 mi = 1.609 km; 1.000 km = 0.621 mi
