= Kit Carson, Colorado =

Town in Colorado, United States

- Statutory Town
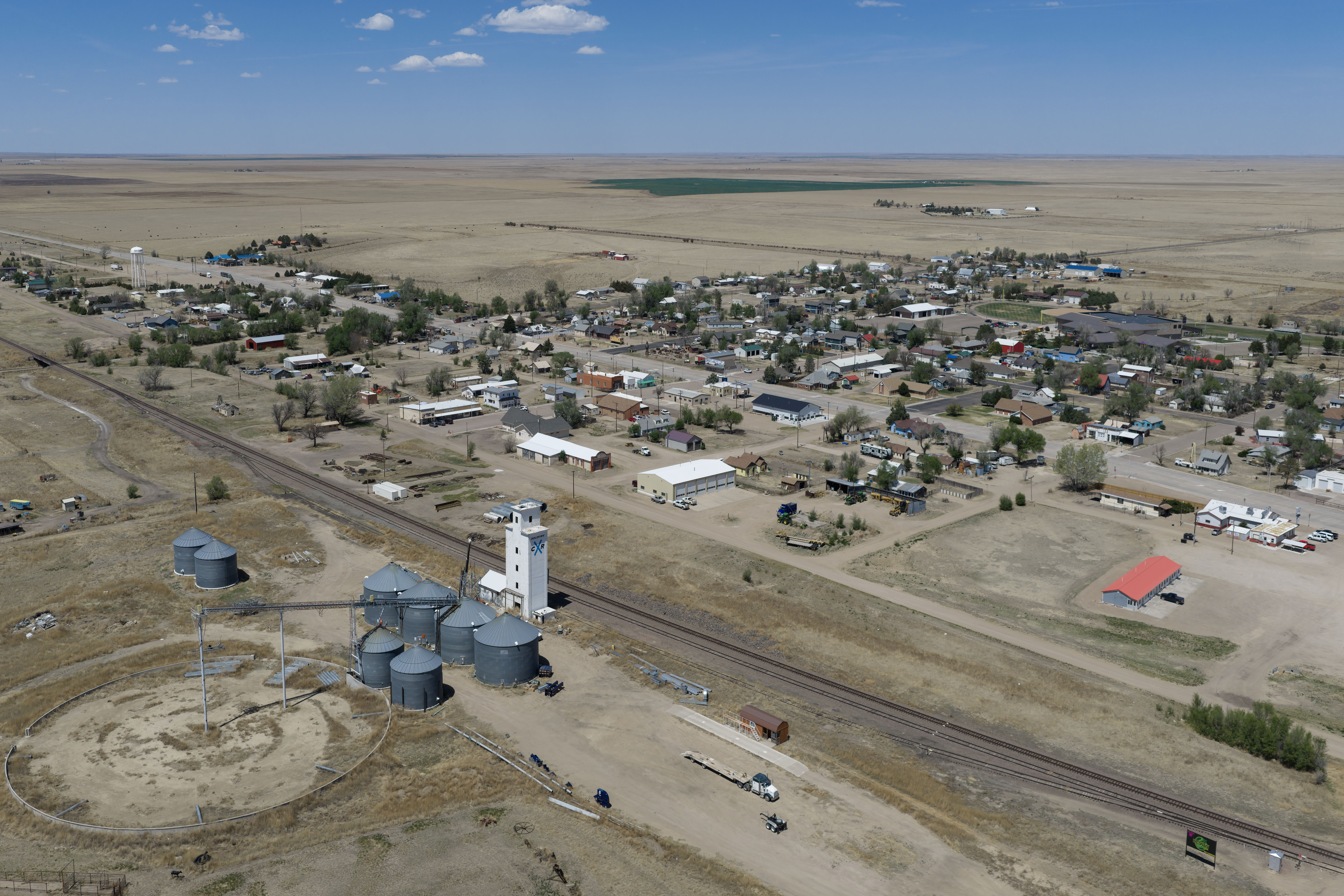
- Kit Carson (2026)

- Location within Cheyenne County and Colorado
- Coordinates: 38°45′50″N 102°47′38″W
- Country: United States
- State: Colorado
- County: Cheyenne
- Incorporated: July 13, 1931

Area
  - Total: 0.58 sq mi (1.51 km^{2})
  - Land: 0.58 sq mi (1.51 km^{2})
  - Water: 0 sq mi (0.00 km^{2})
- Elevation: 4,285 ft (1,306 m)

Population (2020)
  - Total: 255
  - Density: 437/sq mi (169/km^{2})
- Time zone: UTC−7 (MST)
  - Summer (DST): UTC−6 (MDT)
- ZIP Code: 80825
- Area code: 719
- FIPS code: 08-41010
- GNIS ID: 195254
- Website: townofkitcarson.com

Kit Carson is a statutory town in Cheyenne County, Colorado, United States. The population was 255 at the 2020 United States census.

== History ==
The town was established in 1838 and was named in honor of frontiersman Christopher Houston "Kit" Carson.

Located near the site where Carson traded with the Arapahoe and Cheyenne Indians on the Eastern Plains, the town developed into a regional trade and supply outpost and served as an important hub for the Union Pacific railroad. By the 1870s, it was one of the largest shipping points for cattle between Denver and Kansas City.

== Geography ==
According to the United States Census Bureau, the town has a total area of 0.6 square miles (1.6 km^{2}), all land.

The antipode of Kit Carson is Saint Paul Island (French Antarctic island in the Indian Ocean). Kit Carson county is one the few American places whose antipode is located on land, and not in the open sea.

=== Climate ===
Climate data for Kit Carson, Colorado (1991–2020 normals, extremes 1939–present)
| Month | Jan | Feb | Mar | Apr | May | Jun | Jul | Aug | Sep | Oct | Nov | Dec | Year |
|---|---|---|---|---|---|---|---|---|---|---|---|---|---|
| Record high °F (°C) | 77 (25) | 83 (28) | 87 (31) | 94 (34) | 106 (41) | 109 (43) | 108 (42) | 106 (41) | 102 (39) | 96 (36) | 85 (29) | 79 (26) | 109 (43) |
| Mean daily maximum °F (°C) | 45.4 (7.4) | 47.8 (8.8) | 57.7 (14.3) | 65.9 (18.8) | 75.3 (24.1) | 86.7 (30.4) | 92.2 (33.4) | 89.2 (31.8) | 82.3 (27.9) | 68.8 (20.4) | 55.3 (12.9) | 45.4 (7.4) | 67.7 (19.8) |
| Daily mean °F (°C) | 28.6 (−1.9) | 31.1 (−0.5) | 40.6 (4.8) | 48.8 (9.3) | 59.2 (15.1) | 70.2 (21.2) | 75.7 (24.3) | 73.3 (22.9) | 64.8 (18.2) | 50.9 (10.5) | 38.2 (3.4) | 29.2 (−1.6) | 50.9 (10.5) |
| Mean daily minimum °F (°C) | 11.7 (−11.3) | 14.4 (−9.8) | 23.5 (−4.7) | 31.7 (−0.2) | 43.2 (6.2) | 53.8 (12.1) | 59.2 (15.1) | 57.5 (14.2) | 47.3 (8.5) | 33.0 (0.6) | 21.0 (−6.1) | 12.9 (−10.6) | 34.1 (1.2) |
| Record low °F (°C) | −32 (−36) | −29 (−34) | −24 (−31) | 5 (−15) | 19 (−7) | 31 (−1) | 37 (3) | 36 (2) | 17 (−8) | 7 (−14) | −17 (−27) | −29 (−34) | −32 (−36) |
| Average precipitation inches (mm) | 0.26 (6.6) | 0.35 (8.9) | 0.65 (17) | 1.32 (34) | 2.24 (57) | 2.25 (57) | 2.65 (67) | 2.71 (69) | 0.90 (23) | 1.25 (32) | 0.42 (11) | 0.42 (11) | 15.42 (392) |
| Average snowfall inches (cm) | 2.4 (6.1) | 3.0 (7.6) | 3.0 (7.6) | 0.9 (2.3) | 0.0 (0.0) | 0.0 (0.0) | 0.0 (0.0) | 0.0 (0.0) | 0.0 (0.0) | 0.2 (0.51) | 2.4 (6.1) | 4.0 (10) | 15.9 (40) |
| Average precipitation days (≥ 0.01 in) | 1.7 | 2.5 | 3.3 | 4.5 | 6.4 | 5.8 | 7.3 | 6.5 | 3.2 | 3.0 | 2.2 | 2.1 | 48.5 |
| Average snowy days (≥ 0.1 in) | 1.1 | 1.5 | 1.5 | 0.8 | 0.0 | 0.0 | 0.0 | 0.0 | 0.0 | 0.1 | 1.2 | 2.0 | 8.2 |
Source: NOAA

== Demographics ==
Historical population
| Census | Pop. | Note | %± |
|---|---|---|---|
| 1940 | 333 | | — |
| 1950 | 379 | | 13.8% |
| 1960 | 356 | | −6.1% |
| 1970 | 220 | | −38.2% |
| 1980 | 278 | | 26.4% |
| 1990 | 305 | | 9.7% |
| 2000 | 253 | | −17.0% |
| 2010 | 233 | | −7.9% |
| 2020 | 255 | | 9.4% |
U.S. Decennial Census

== See also ==
- Colorado municipalities
- Kit Carson Mesa
