= Sedgwick, Colorado =

Town in Colorado, United States

- Town
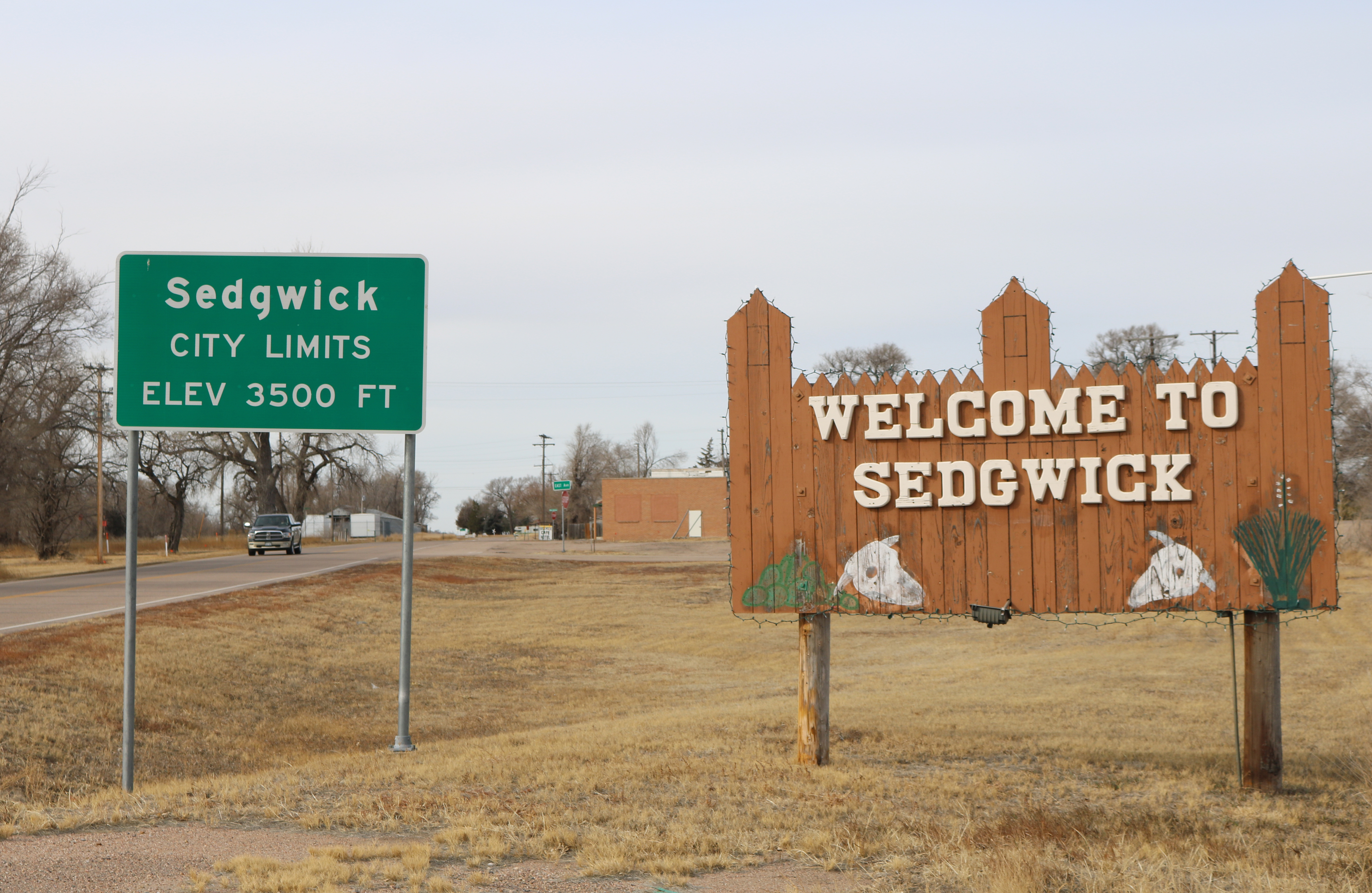
- Community signs (2017)

- Location within Sedgwick County and Colorado
- Coordinates: 40°56′08″N 102°31′32″W
- Country: United States
- State: Colorado
- County: Sedgwick County
- Incorporated: January 28, 1918

Area
  - Total: 0.35 sq mi (0.90 km^{2})
  - Land: 0.35 sq mi (0.90 km^{2})
  - Water: 0 sq mi (0.00 km^{2})
- Elevation: 3,589 ft (1,094 m)

Population (2020)
  - Total: 172
  - Density: 490/sq mi (190/km^{2})
- Time zone: UTC−7 (MST)
  - Summer (DST): UTC−6 (MDT)
- ZIP Code: 80749ZIP code
- Area code: 970
- FIPS code: 08-68930
- GNIS ID: 2413269
- Website: sedgwickcolorado.com

Sedgwick is a statutory town in Sedgwick County, Colorado, United States. The population was 172 at the 2020 census.

== History ==
The town was named for Fort Sedgwick, which was named after John Sedgwick, who was a major general in the Union Army during the American Civil War.

== Geography ==
According to the United States Census Bureau, the town has a total area of 0.3 square miles (0.78 km^{2}), all of it land.

=== Climate ===
According to the Köppen Climate Classification system, Sedgwick has a semi-arid climate, abbreviated "BSk" on climate maps. July 1954 was one of Sedgwick's warmest months to date. The town had 16 days of temperatures at or above 100 °F (37.8 °C) and on July 11, 1954, Sedgwick saw its temperature rise to 114 °F (46 °C).

Climate data for Sedgwick, Colorado, 1991–2020 normals, extremes 1952–present
Month	Jan	Feb	Mar	Apr	May	Jun	Jul	Aug	Sep	Oct	Nov	Dec	Year
Record high °F (°C)	73 (23)	77 (25)	86 (30)	94 (34)	100 (38)	110 (43)	114 (46)	106 (41)	103 (39)	94 (34)	81 (27)	76 (24)	114 (46)
Mean maximum °F (°C)	62.0 (16.7)	66.5 (19.2)	77.2 (25.1)	83.4 (28.6)	90.6 (32.6)	98.1 (36.7)	102.7 (39.3)	99.5 (37.5)	96.3 (35.7)	86.9 (30.5)	73.9 (23.3)	62.5 (16.9)	103.6 (39.8)
Mean daily maximum °F (°C)	39.5 (4.2)	42.3 (5.7)	53.3 (11.8)	60.7 (15.9)	70.1 (21.2)	82.6 (28.1)	89.7 (32.1)	87.2 (30.7)	79.3 (26.3)	64.0 (17.8)	50.4 (10.2)	39.9 (4.4)	63.2 (17.4)
Daily mean °F (°C)	27.4 (−2.6)	29.8 (−1.2)	39.3 (4.1)	46.8 (8.2)	56.9 (13.8)	68.5 (20.3)	75.0 (23.9)	72.6 (22.6)	64.1 (17.8)	49.7 (9.8)	37.4 (3.0)	27.9 (−2.3)	49.6 (9.8)
Mean daily minimum °F (°C)	15.2 (−9.3)	17.3 (−8.2)	25.3 (−3.7)	33.0 (0.6)	43.8 (6.6)	54.4 (12.4)	60.3 (15.7)	57.9 (14.4)	48.8 (9.3)	35.5 (1.9)	24.3 (−4.3)	16.0 (−8.9)	36.0 (2.2)
Mean minimum °F (°C)	−5.7 (−20.9)	−1.9 (−18.8)	7.5 (−13.6)	18.6 (−7.4)	29.5 (−1.4)	43.3 (6.3)	51.8 (11.0)	48.5 (9.2)	35.3 (1.8)	18.2 (−7.7)	6.5 (−14.2)	−3.1 (−19.5)	−11.7 (−24.3)
Record low °F (°C)	−26 (−32)	−26 (−32)	−16 (−27)	6 (−14)	21 (−6)	33 (1)	42 (6)	40 (4)	17 (−8)	−2 (−19)	−9 (−23)	−30 (−34)	−30 (−34)
Average precipitation inches (mm)	0.32 (8.1)	0.49 (12)	0.90 (23)	2.03 (52)	2.92 (74)	3.15 (80)	2.16 (55)	2.08 (53)	1.35 (34)	1.32 (34)	0.52 (13)	0.37 (9.4)	17.61 (447.5)
Average snowfall inches (cm)	4.1 (10)	6.1 (15)	5.1 (13)	4.6 (12)	0.4 (1.0)	0.0 (0.0)	0.0 (0.0)	0.0 (0.0)	0.2 (0.51)	2.5 (6.4)	3.6 (9.1)	4.8 (12)	31.4 (79.01)
Average precipitation days (≥ 0.01 in)	2.6	4.1	5.0	7.2	9.1	8.7	7.4	6.8	5.2	5.6	3.4	2.9	68.0
Average snowy days (≥ 0.1 in)	2.3	3.4	2.5	1.8	0.2	0.0	0.0	0.0	0.1	1.0	1.8	2.6	15.7
Source 1: NOAA
Source 2: National Weather Service

== Demographics ==
Historical population
Census	Pop.	Note	%±
1920	380		—
1930	444		16.8%
1940	373		−16.0%
1950	332		−11.0%
1960	299		−9.9%
1970	208		−30.4%
1980	258		24.0%
1990	183		−29.1%
2000	191		4.4%
2010	146		−23.6%
2020	172		17.8%

== See also ==
- Colorado counties
