= Crook, Colorado =

Town in Colorado, US

- Statutory town
- Town of Crook
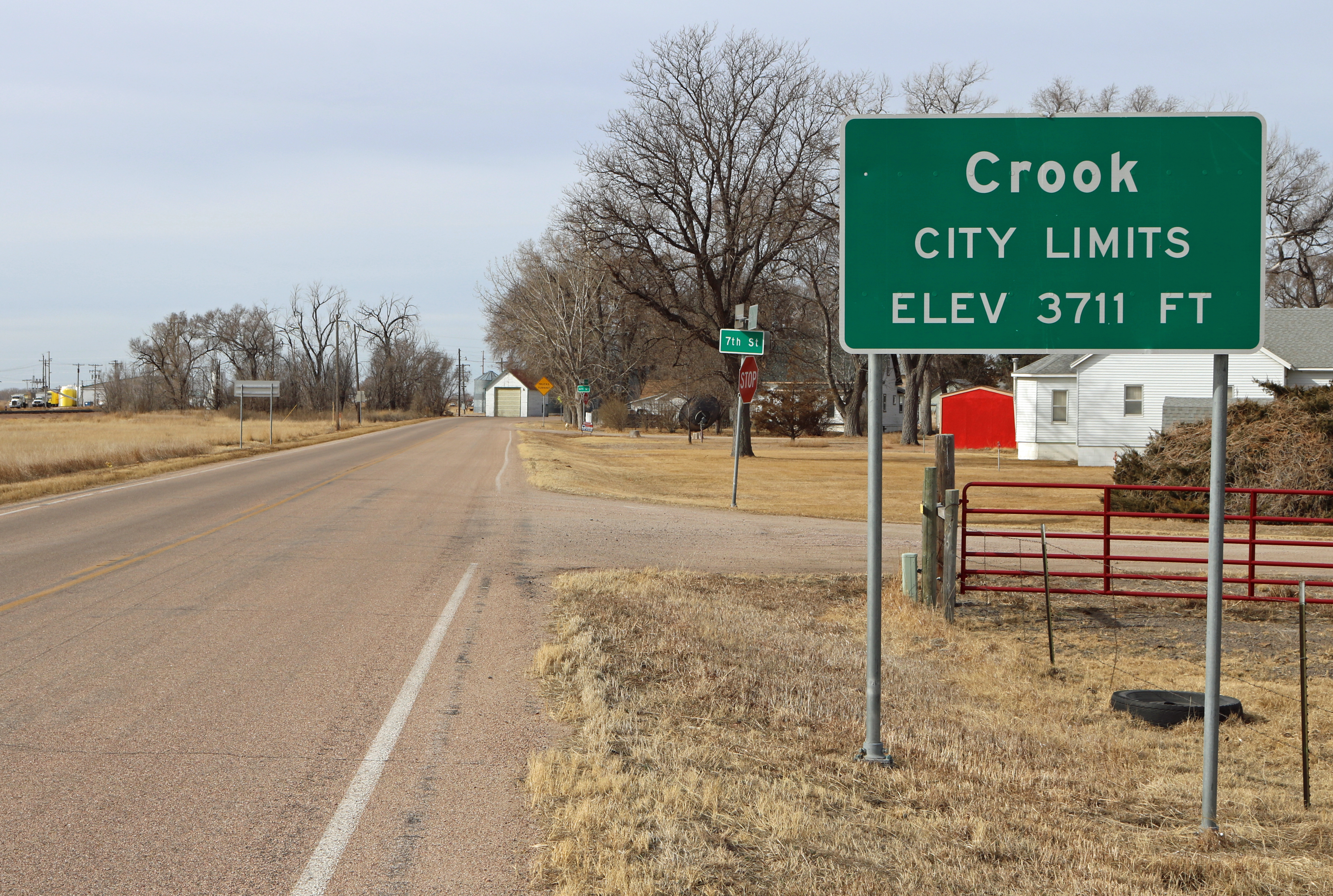
- Entering from the east on U.S. Route 138.

- Location of the Town of Crook in Logan County, Colorado
- Coordinates: 40°51′32″N 102°48′05″W
- Country: United States
- State: Colorado
- County: Logan
- Incorporated: September 23, 1918

Government
  - Type: Statutory town

Area
  - Total: 0.135 sq mi (0.349 km^{2})
  - Land: 0.135 sq mi (0.349 km^{2})
  - Water: 0 sq mi (0.000 km^{2})
- Elevation: 3,708 ft (1,130 m)

Population (2020)
  - Total: 133
  - Density: 987/sq mi (381/km^{2})
- Time zone: UTC−07:00 (MST)
  - Summer (DST): UTC−06:00 (MDT)
- ZIP code: 80726
- Area code: 970/748
- GNIS town ID: 2412389
- FIPS code: 08-18640
- Website: www.facebook.com/TownofCrook/

The Town of Crook is a statutory town located in Logan County, Colorado, United States. The town population was 133 at the 2020 United States census. Crook is a part of the Sterling, CO Micropolitan Statistical Area.

== History ==
The Crook, Colorado, post office opened on May 26, 1882. The Town of Crook was incorporated on September 23, 1918

=== Toponymy ===
The town was named for General George Crook, a general officer during the American Civil War and the Indian Wars. Crook has frequently been noted on lists of unusual place names.

== Geography ==
At the 2020 United States census, the town had a total area of 86 acres (0.349 km^{2}), all of it land.

=== Climate ===
According to the Köppen Climate Classification system, Crook has a cold semi-arid climate, abbreviated "BSk" on climate maps.

Climate data for Crook, Colorado, 1991–2020 normals, extremes 1996–2021
Month	Jan	Feb	Mar	Apr	May	Jun	Jul	Aug	Sep	Oct	Nov	Dec	Year
Record high °F (°C)	77 (25)	81 (27)	88 (31)	99 (37)	99 (37)	110 (43)	112 (44)	108 (42)	106 (41)	97 (36)	88 (31)	78 (26)	112 (44)
Mean maximum °F (°C)	65.6 (18.7)	70.3 (21.3)	81.9 (27.7)	89.1 (31.7)	94.2 (34.6)	103.2 (39.6)	104.2 (40.1)	102.2 (39.0)	99.3 (37.4)	90.4 (32.4)	80.9 (27.2)	67.0 (19.4)	105.6 (40.9)
Mean daily maximum °F (°C)	44.0 (6.7)	46.9 (8.3)	57.4 (14.1)	64.5 (18.1)	73.4 (23.0)	85.4 (29.7)	91.9 (33.3)	89.9 (32.2)	81.8 (27.7)	68.1 (20.1)	55.4 (13.0)	44.3 (6.8)	66.9 (19.4)
Daily mean °F (°C)	28.6 (−1.9)	31.2 (−0.4)	40.5 (4.7)	47.9 (8.8)	57.7 (14.3)	68.9 (20.5)	75.0 (23.9)	72.9 (22.7)	64.3 (17.9)	50.8 (10.4)	38.6 (3.7)	29.0 (−1.7)	50.4 (10.2)
Mean daily minimum °F (°C)	13.2 (−10.4)	15.6 (−9.1)	23.6 (−4.7)	31.3 (−0.4)	41.9 (5.5)	52.3 (11.3)	58.2 (14.6)	55.9 (13.3)	46.7 (8.2)	33.5 (0.8)	21.8 (−5.7)	13.6 (−10.2)	34.0 (1.1)
Mean minimum °F (°C)	−8.4 (−22.4)	−4.6 (−20.3)	8.1 (−13.3)	17.3 (−8.2)	28.1 (−2.2)	41.7 (5.4)	50.2 (10.1)	46.3 (7.9)	34.3 (1.3)	16.8 (−8.4)	6.1 (−14.4)	−8.0 (−22.2)	−14.0 (−25.6)
Record low °F (°C)	−20 (−29)	−30 (−34)	−16 (−27)	6 (−14)	20 (−7)	32 (0)	44 (7)	40 (4)	25 (−4)	2 (−17)	−10 (−23)	−20 (−29)	−30 (−34)
Average precipitation inches (mm)	0.31 (7.9)	0.50 (13)	0.89 (23)	1.80 (46)	2.75 (70)	2.63 (67)	2.61 (66)	2.09 (53)	1.38 (35)	1.16 (29)	0.45 (11)	0.33 (8.4)	16.90 (429)
Average snowfall inches (cm)	2.9 (7.4)	6.5 (17)	3.6 (9.1)	3.0 (7.6)	0.4 (1.0)	0.0 (0.0)	0.0 (0.0)	0.0 (0.0)	0.1 (0.25)	1.6 (4.1)	2.6 (6.6)	4.7 (12)	25.4 (65.05)
Average precipitation days (≥ 0.01 in)	3.0	5.0	6.2	9.2	11.0	9.7	8.9	8.5	6.0	6.2	3.5	3.3	80.5
Average snowy days (≥ 0.1 in)	2.1	3.8	2.5	1.8	0.3	0.0	0.0	0.0	0.0	1.0	1.8	2.9	16.2
Source 1: NOAA
Source 2: National Weather Service (mean maxima and minima 2006–2020)

== Demographics ==
Historical population
Census	Pop.	Note	%±
1920	232		—
1930	251		8.2%
1940	236		−6.0%
1950	259		9.7%
1960	209		−19.3%
1970	199		−4.8%
1980	177		−11.1%
1990	148		−16.4%
2000	128		−13.5%
2010	110		−14.1%
2020	133		20.9%
U.S. Decennial Census

As of the census of 2000, there were 128 people, 57 households, and 38 families residing in the town. The population density was 991.5 inhabitants per square mile (382.8/km^{2}). There were 80 housing units at an average density of 619.7 per square mile (239.3/km^{2}). The racial makeup of the town was 100.00% White. Hispanic or Latino of any race were 3.91% of the population.

There were 57 households, out of which 17.5% had children under the age of 18 living with them, 63.2% were married couples living together, 1.8% had a female householder with no husband present, and 33.3% were non-families. 33.3% of all households were made up of individuals, and 17.5% had someone living alone who was 65 years of age or older. The average household size was 2.25 and the average family size was 2.82.

In the town, the population was spread out, with 18.0% under the age of 18, 8.6% from 18 to 24, 19.5% from 25 to 44, 31.3% from 45 to 64, and 22.7% who were 65 years of age or older. The median age was 50 years. For every 100 females, there were 109.8 males. For every 100 females age 18 and over, there were 101.9 males.

The median income for a household in the town was $32,500, and the median income for a family was $35,833. Males had a median income of $29,167 versus $26,250 for females. The per capita income for the town was $19,127. There were no families and 3.7% of the population living below the poverty line, including no under eighteens and 10.3% of those over 64.

== See also ==
- Sterling, CO Micropolitan Statistical Area
