= Fleming, Colorado =

Statutory town in Logan County, Colorado, United States

- Statutory town
- Town of Fleming
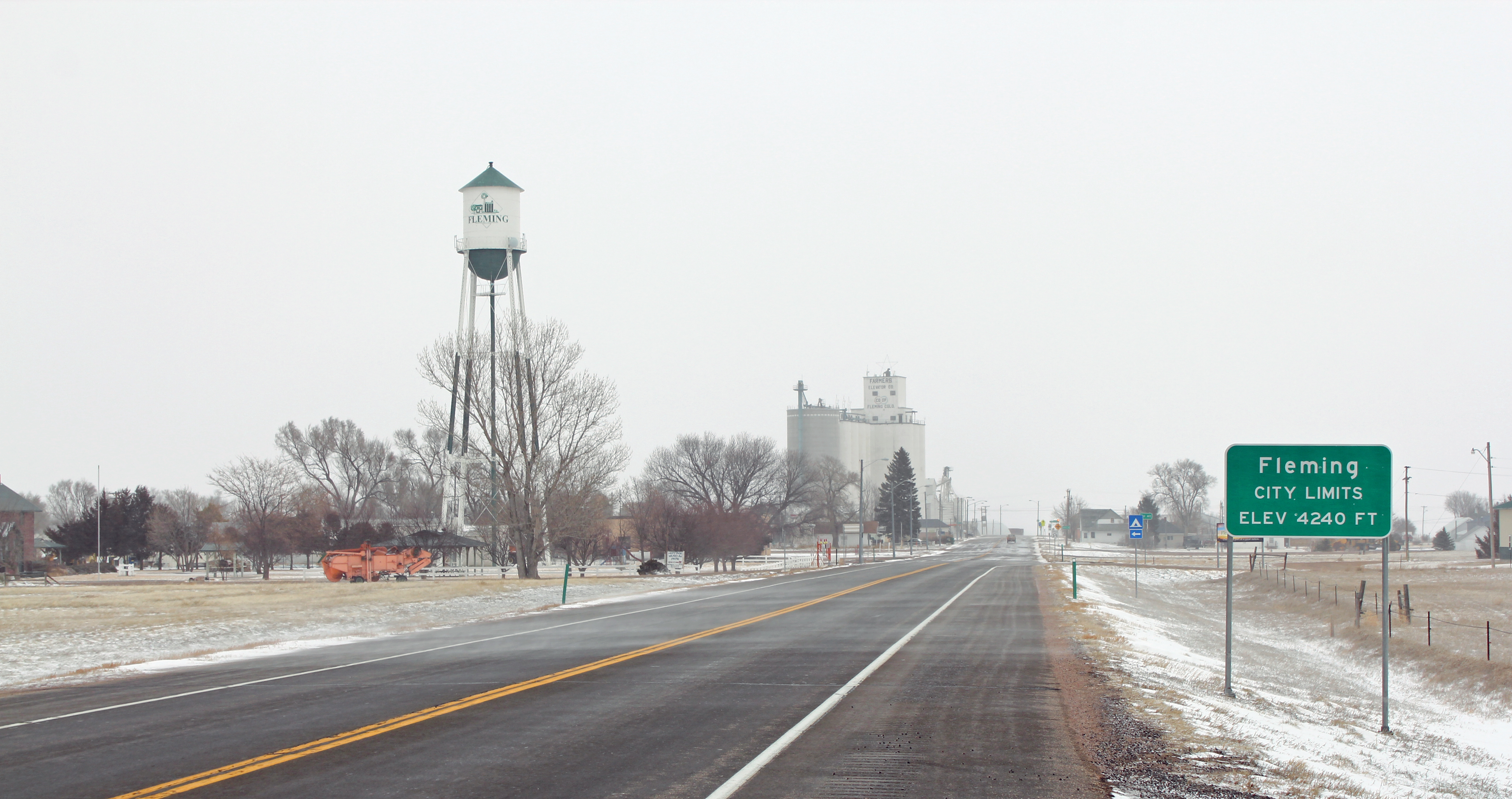
- Entering Fleming from the west.

- Location of the Town of Fleming in Logan County, Colorado
- Coordinates: 40°40′55″N 102°50′23″W
- Country: United States
- State: Colorado
- County: Logan
- Incorporated (town): May 5, 1917

Government
  - Type: statutory town

Area
  - Total: 0.489 sq mi (1.267 km^{2})
  - Land: 0.489 sq mi (1.267 km^{2})
  - Water: 0 sq mi (0.000 km^{2})
- Elevation: 4,239 ft (1,292 m)

Population (2020)
  - Total: 428
  - Density: 875/sq mi (338/km^{2})
- Time zone: UTC−07:00 (MST)
  - Summer (DST): UTC−06:00 (MDT)
- ZIP code: 80728
- Area codes: 970/748
- GNIS town ID: 2412631
- FIPS code: 08-26875
- Website: www.flemingcolorado.us

The Town of Fleming is a statutory town located in western Logan County, Colorado, United States. The town population was 428 at the 2020 United States census. Fleming is a part of the Sterling, CO Micropolitan Statistical Area.

== History ==
The Fleming, Colorado, post office opened on August 8, 1888, and the Town of Fleming was incorporated on May 5, 1917. Fleming was named for Henry Bascom Fleming, a railroad official.

== Geography ==
Fleming is located in western Logan County.

At the 2020 United States census, the town had a total area of 313 acres (1.267 km^{2}), all of it land.

=== Climate ===
According to the Köppen Climate Classification system, Fleming has a semi-arid climate, abbreviated "BSk" on climate maps.

Climate data for Fleming, Colorado, 1991–2020 normals, extremes 1998–present
Month	Jan	Feb	Mar	Apr	May	Jun	Jul	Aug	Sep	Oct	Nov	Dec	Year
Record high °F (°C)	74 (23)	78 (26)	85 (29)	92 (33)	99 (37)	109 (43)	107 (42)	106 (41)	103 (39)	93 (34)	83 (28)	77 (25)	109 (43)
Mean maximum °F (°C)	61.7 (16.5)	67.0 (19.4)	77.9 (25.5)	84.3 (29.1)	91.0 (32.8)	100.3 (37.9)	102.3 (39.1)	99.9 (37.7)	95.6 (35.3)	87.9 (31.1)	76.5 (24.7)	64.1 (17.8)	103.8 (39.9)
Mean daily maximum °F (°C)	41.7 (5.4)	44.3 (6.8)	54.3 (12.4)	61.6 (16.4)	71.1 (21.7)	83.1 (28.4)	90.0 (32.2)	88.3 (31.3)	80.2 (26.8)	65.4 (18.6)	52.0 (11.1)	42.2 (5.7)	64.5 (18.1)
Daily mean °F (°C)	29.4 (−1.4)	31.6 (−0.2)	40.4 (4.7)	47.6 (8.7)	57.9 (14.4)	69.0 (20.6)	75.6 (24.2)	73.4 (23.0)	64.9 (18.3)	50.9 (10.5)	38.8 (3.8)	29.8 (−1.2)	50.8 (10.5)
Mean daily minimum °F (°C)	17.1 (−8.3)	18.8 (−7.3)	26.6 (−3.0)	33.6 (0.9)	44.6 (7.0)	54.9 (12.7)	61.2 (16.2)	58.5 (14.7)	49.5 (9.7)	36.4 (2.4)	25.5 (−3.6)	17.4 (−8.1)	37.0 (2.8)
Mean minimum °F (°C)	−6.4 (−21.3)	−4.7 (−20.4)	7.9 (−13.4)	16.9 (−8.4)	28.4 (−2.0)	41.0 (5.0)	50.8 (10.4)	46.9 (8.3)	35.4 (1.9)	18.0 (−7.8)	7.1 (−13.8)	−7.5 (−21.9)	−13.7 (−25.4)
Record low °F (°C)	−20 (−29)	−26 (−32)	−15 (−26)	6 (−14)	18 (−8)	33 (1)	46 (8)	39 (4)	28 (−2)	5 (−15)	−13 (−25)	−23 (−31)	−26 (−32)
Average precipitation inches (mm)	0.25 (6.4)	0.40 (10)	0.90 (23)	1.81 (46)	3.09 (78)	2.49 (63)	2.60 (66)	2.17 (55)	1.28 (33)	1.28 (33)	0.51 (13)	0.40 (10)	17.18 (436.4)
Average snowfall inches (cm)	3.7 (9.4)	7.4 (19)	4.8 (12)	5.1 (13)	1.2 (3.0)	0.2 (0.51)	0.0 (0.0)	0.0 (0.0)	0.2 (0.51)	3.1 (7.9)	4.4 (11)	6.9 (18)	37.0 (94)
Average precipitation days (≥ 0.01 in)	2.7	4.0	4.4	6.7	8.8	7.6	7.5	6.5	5.2	5.0	3.3	3.4	65.1
Average snowy days (≥ 0.1 in)	3.7	5.0	3.3	2.5	0.5	0.1	0.0	0.0	0.1	1.2	2.9	4.3	23.6
Source 1: NOAA
Source 2: National Weather Service (mean maxima and minima 2006–2020)

== Demographics ==
Historical population
Census	Pop.	Note	%±
1920	518		—
1930	365		−29.5%
1940	400		9.6%
1950	377		−5.7%
1960	384		1.9%
1970	349		−9.1%
1980	388		11.2%
1990	344		−11.3%
2000	426		23.8%
2010	408		−4.2%
2020	428		4.9%
U.S. Decennial Census

As of the census of 2000, there were 426 people, 169 households, and 115 families residing in the town. The population density was 822.9 inhabitants per square mile (317.7/km^{2}). There were 198 housing units at an average density of 382.5 per square mile (147.7/km^{2}). The racial makeup of the town was 96.71% White, 2.35% African American, 0.23% Native American, and 0.70% from two or more races. Hispanic or Latino of any race were 2.35% of the population.

There were 169 households, out of which 30.8% had children under the age of 18 living with them, 58.6% were married couples living together, 7.7% had a female householder with no husband present, and 31.4% were non-families. 30.2% of all households were made up of individuals, and 14.8% had someone living alone who was 65 years of age or older. The average household size was 2.52 and the average family size was 3.14.

In the town, the population was spread out, with 28.9% under the age of 18, 6.1% from 18 to 24, 23.0% from 25 to 44, 22.8% from 45 to 64, and 19.2% who were 65 years of age or older. The median age was 39 years. For every 100 females, there were 91.9 males. For every 100 females age 18 and over, there were 93.0 males.

The median income for a household in the town was $26,484, and the median income for a family was $31,818. Males had a median income of $25,417 versus $14,063 for females. The per capita income for the town was $12,113. About 6.4% of families and 12.4% of the population were below the poverty line, including 23.0% of those under age 18 and 10.8% of those age 65 or over.

== See also ==
- Sterling, CO Micropolitan Statistical Area
