= Sterling, Colorado =

City in Colorado, United States

- Home rule municipality
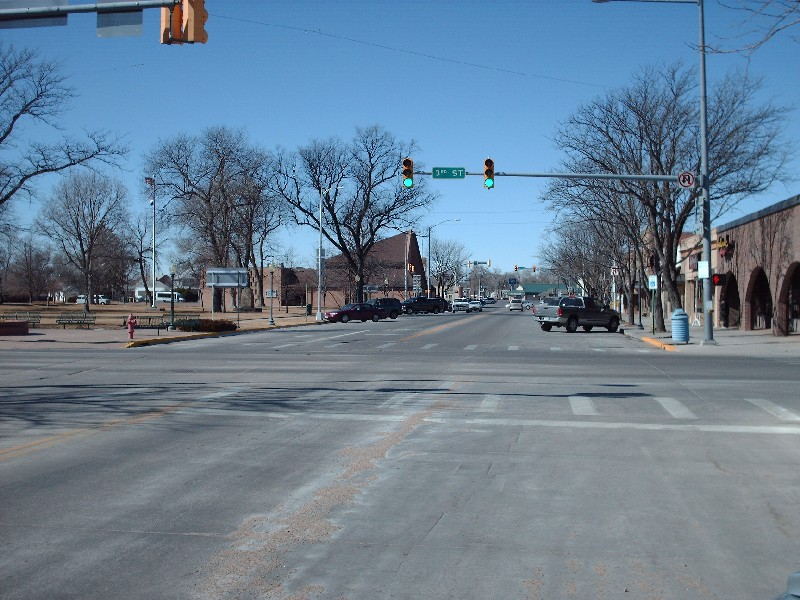
- Main Street in Sterling (2006)
- Nickname: A Colorado Treasure
- Location within Logan County and Colorado
- Coordinates: 40°37′35″N 103°11′52″W
- Country: United States
- State: Colorado
- County: Logan County
- City: Sterling
- Settled: 1868
- Platted: 1890
- Incorporated: December 3, 1884

Government
  - Type: Home rule municipality

Area
  - Total: 7.43 sq mi (19.25 km^{2})
  - Land: 7.43 sq mi (19.25 km^{2})
  - Water: 0 sq mi (0.00 km^{2})
- Elevation: 3,931 ft (1,198 m)

Population (2020)
  - Total: 13,735
  - Density: 1,848/sq mi (713.5/km^{2})
- Time zone: UTC−7 (MST)
  - Summer (DST): UTC−6 (MDT)
- ZIP code: 80751
- Area code: 970
- FIPS code: 08-73935
- GNIS feature ID: 2411978
- Website: City of Sterling

Sterling is a home rule municipality and the county seat and most populous municipality of Logan County, Colorado, United States. The city population was 13,735 at the 2020 census. Sterling is the largest city in the Eastern Plains region of Colorado and the site of the domed Logan County Courthouse, built in 1909. The city is also home to Northeastern Junior College, enrolling over 1,500 students annually.

== History ==
A post office called Sterling has been in operation since 1874. The community was named for Sterling, Illinois, the native home of a railroad official.

== Geography ==
Sterling is 128 miles (206 km) northeast of Denver, and is located on Interstate 76, on the 'eastern plains' of northeastern Colorado.

According to the United States Census Bureau, the city has a total area of 7.43 square miles (19.2 km^{2}), all land.

=== Climate ===
According to the Köppen Climate Classification system, Sterling has a semi-arid climate, abbreviated "BSk" on climate maps.

Climate data for Sterling, Colorado (1981–2010)
Month	Jan	Feb	Mar	Apr	May	Jun	Jul	Aug	Sep	Oct	Nov	Dec	Year
Mean daily maximum °F (°C)	42 (6)	46 (8)	56 (13)	64 (18)	74 (23)	84 (29)	91 (33)	89 (32)	80 (27)	67 (19)	53 (12)	42 (6)	66 (19)
Mean daily minimum °F (°C)	14 (−10)	18 (−8)	26 (−3)	35 (2)	46 (8)	56 (13)	61 (16)	59 (15)	48 (9)	35 (2)	24 (−4)	15 (−9)	36 (3)
Average precipitation inches (mm)	0.30 (7.6)	0.36 (9.1)	0.96 (24)	1.33 (34)	2.31 (59)	2.76 (70)	2.66 (68)	1.88 (48)	1.18 (30)	1.09 (28)	0.54 (14)	0.34 (8.6)	15.72 (399)
Average snowfall inches (cm)	4.0 (10)	4.0 (10)	3.7 (9.4)	1.8 (4.6)	0.0 (0.0)	0.0 (0.0)	0.0 (0.0)	0.0 (0.0)	0.4 (1.0)	1.0 (2.5)	4.1 (10)	5.8 (15)	24.8 (63)
Source: Weather.com

== Demographics ==
Historical population
Census	Pop.	Note	%±
1890	540		—
1900	998		84.8%
1910	3,044		205.0%
1920	6,415		110.7%
1930	7,195		12.2%
1940	7,411		3.0%
1950	7,534		1.7%
1960	10,751		42.7%
1970	10,636		−1.1%
1980	11,385		7.0%
1990	10,362		−9.0%
2000	11,360		9.6%
2010	14,777		30.1%
2020	13,735		−7.1%
U.S. Decennial Census

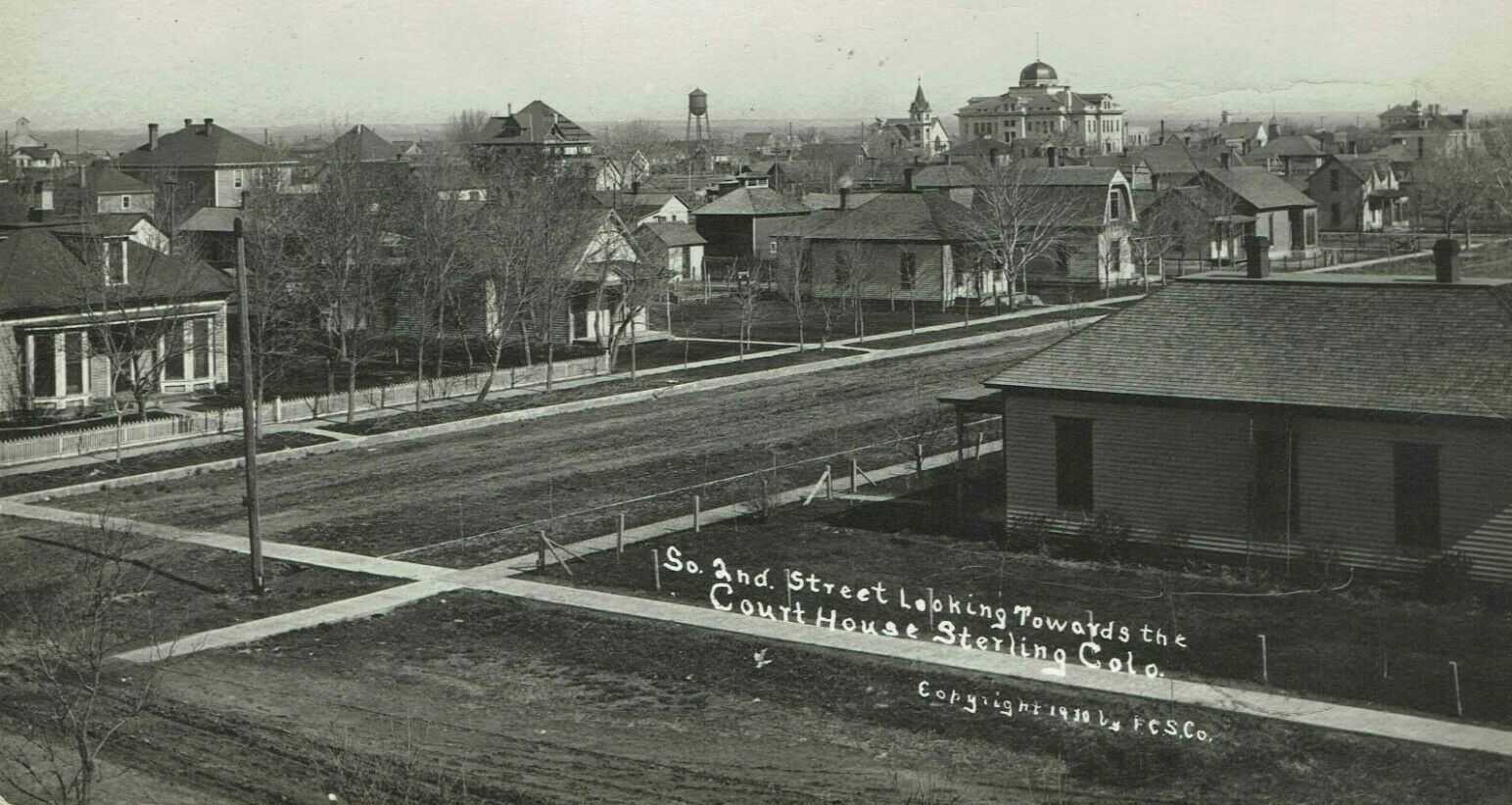
A postcard view taken from the corner of South Second Street and Cedar Street and mailed on March 28, 1911

Sterling is the principal city of the Sterling, CO Micropolitan Statistical Area.

=== 2020 census ===
As of the 2020 census, there were 13,753 people, 4,604 households, and 2,790 families living in the city. The population density was 1,653.1 inhabitants per square mile (638.3/km^{2}). There were 5,171 housing units at an average density of 752.5 per square mile (290.5/km^{2}). The racial makeup of the city was 90.75% Caucasian American, 0.75% African American, 0.79% Native American, 0.41% Asian, 0.08% Pacific Islander, 5.60% from other races, and 1.62% from two or more races. Hispanic or Latino of any race were 14.20% of the population.

There were 4,604 households, out of which 30.6% had children under the age of 18 living with them, 46.2% were married couples living together, 10.8% had a female householder with no husband present, and 39.4% were non-families. 34.1% of all households were made up of individuals, and 14.7% had someone living alone who was 65 years of age or older. The average household size was 2.34 and the average family size was 3.03.

In the city, the population was spread out, with 25.5% under the age of 18, 12.9% from 18 to 24, 25.5% from 25 to 44, 19.6% from 45 to 64, and 16.4% who were 65 years of age or older. The median age was 35 years. For every 100 females, there were 94.7 males. For every 100 females age 18 and over, there were 91.2 males.

The median income for a household in the city was $27,337, and the median income for a family was $39,103. Males had a median income of $27,921 versus $20,508 for females. The per capita income for the city was $15,287.

== Economy ==
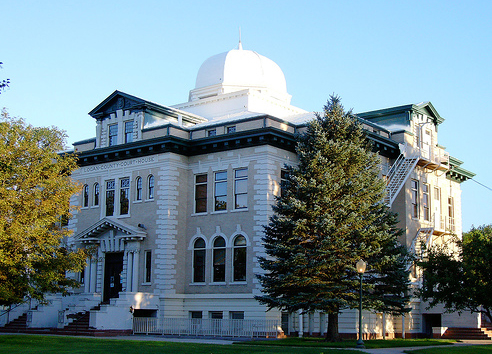
Logan County Courthouse today

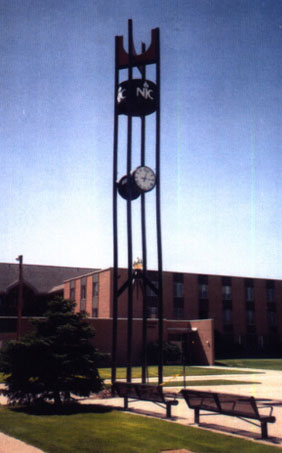
Northeastern Junior College

Major employers in Sterling include Northeastern Junior College, the RE-1 Valley School system, and the Sterling Correctional Facility.

Sterling is the major shopping hub for most of northeastern Colorado and hosts big box retailers, as well as many local stores located primarily on Main Street. Six different banks have branches in Sterling and there are local AM and FM radio stations as well as a local television station, and a long-established regional newspaper, the Sterling Journal-Advocate and South Platte Sentinel .

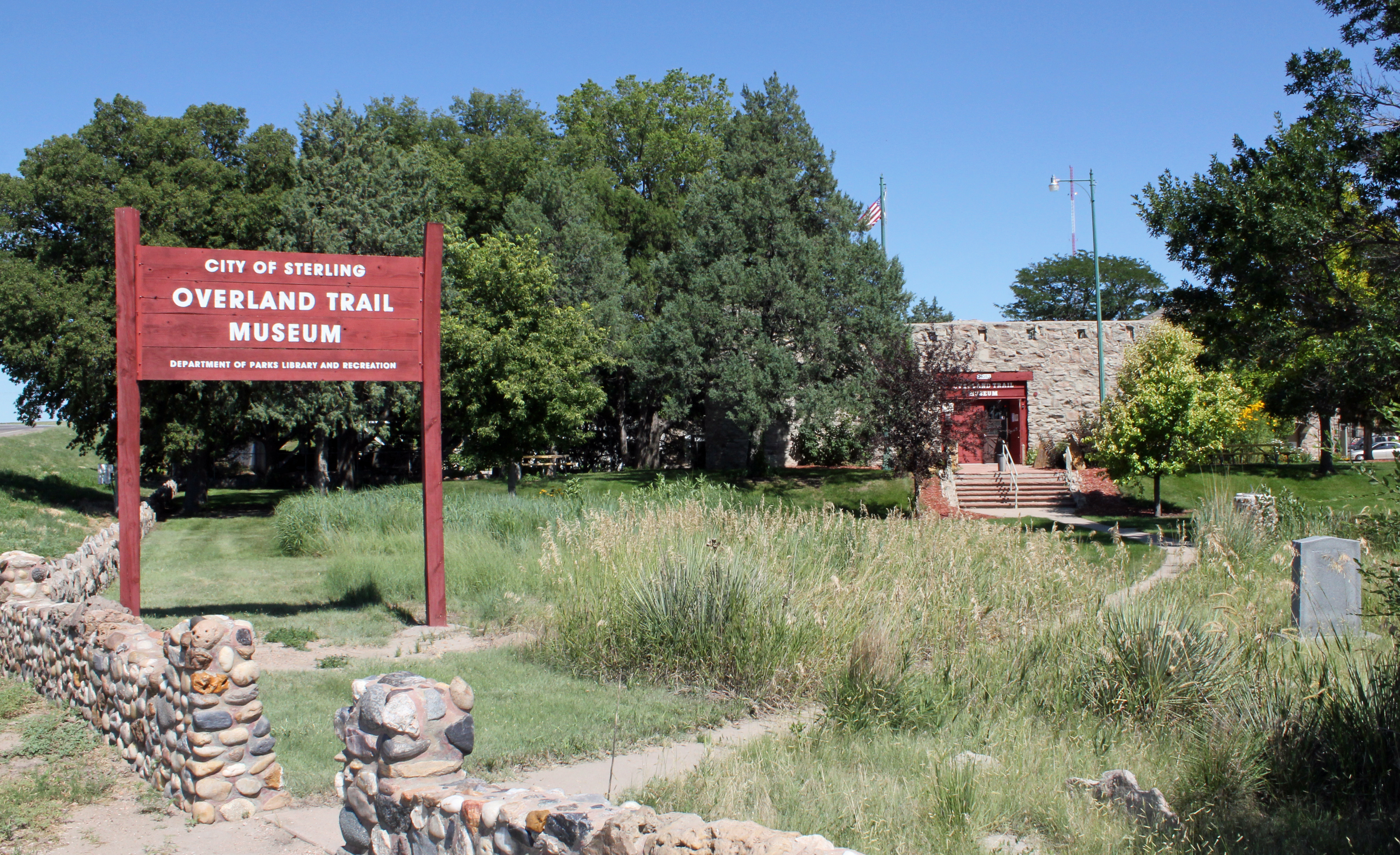
The Overland Trail Museum in Sterling

== Government ==
The Colorado Department of Corrections operates the Sterling Correctional Facility in Sterling.

== Education ==
Sterling is the home of Northeastern Junior College. Sterling is also the location of the RE-1 Valley School District.

Sterling High School on Tiger Avenue and Bengal Boulevard was built in 1958. It originally had grades 10-12, but expanded to include 9th grade in 1974. Building renovations occurred 2006–2007.

== Infrastructure ==
=== Transportation ===
Crosson Field serves as Sterling's airport, but there are no scheduled commercial flights available from there. The closest airport served by scheduled flights is Denver International Airport, located 121 miles (195 km) away.

Sterling is also served by railroads, although only freight carriers serve the town. The main rail operator is Burlington Northern Santa Fe (BNSF), but other operators, like Union Pacific, serve Sterling as well. The closest Amtrak station is located in Fort Morgan, Colorado, about 47 miles (76 km) away.

Intercity bus service is offered by and Express Arrow with service to Denver, as well as a number of cities in Nebraska including North Platte, Kearney, and Omaha. Sterling is also part of Colorado's Bustang network, as the eastern terminus of the Sterling–Denver and Sterling–Greeley routes, which operate two days per week and three days per week respectively.

==== Highways ====
- Interstate 76 connects Sterling to Denver (128 miles (206 km) southwest) and northeast to Interstate 80, in Big Springs, Nebraska, along the South Platte River.
- Business Loop 76 starts on the intersection of Interstate 76 and US 6, going through East Chestnut Street, North and South 4th Street, South Division Avenue, returning to US 6, connecting Sterling to Atwood and Merino.
- US 6 runs east–west linking Provincetown, Massachusetts with Bishop, California, via Nevada, Colorado, Illinois and 8 other states.
- US 138 Runs parallel to Interstate 76, connecting Sterling to US 30, north of Big Springs, Nebraska.
- State Highway 14 connects Sterling to Fort Collins located 102 miles (164 km) to the west.

=== Health care ===
Sterling is a regional center for health care as well and is the home of Sterling Regional MedCenter (SRMC).

=== Media ===
==== Radio ====
- KSRX (97.5 FM), Branded as Bob FM, plays "80's, 90's... and whatever!"

== See also ==
- Sterling, CO Micropolitan Statistical Area
