= Ovid, Colorado =

Town in Colorado, United States

- Town
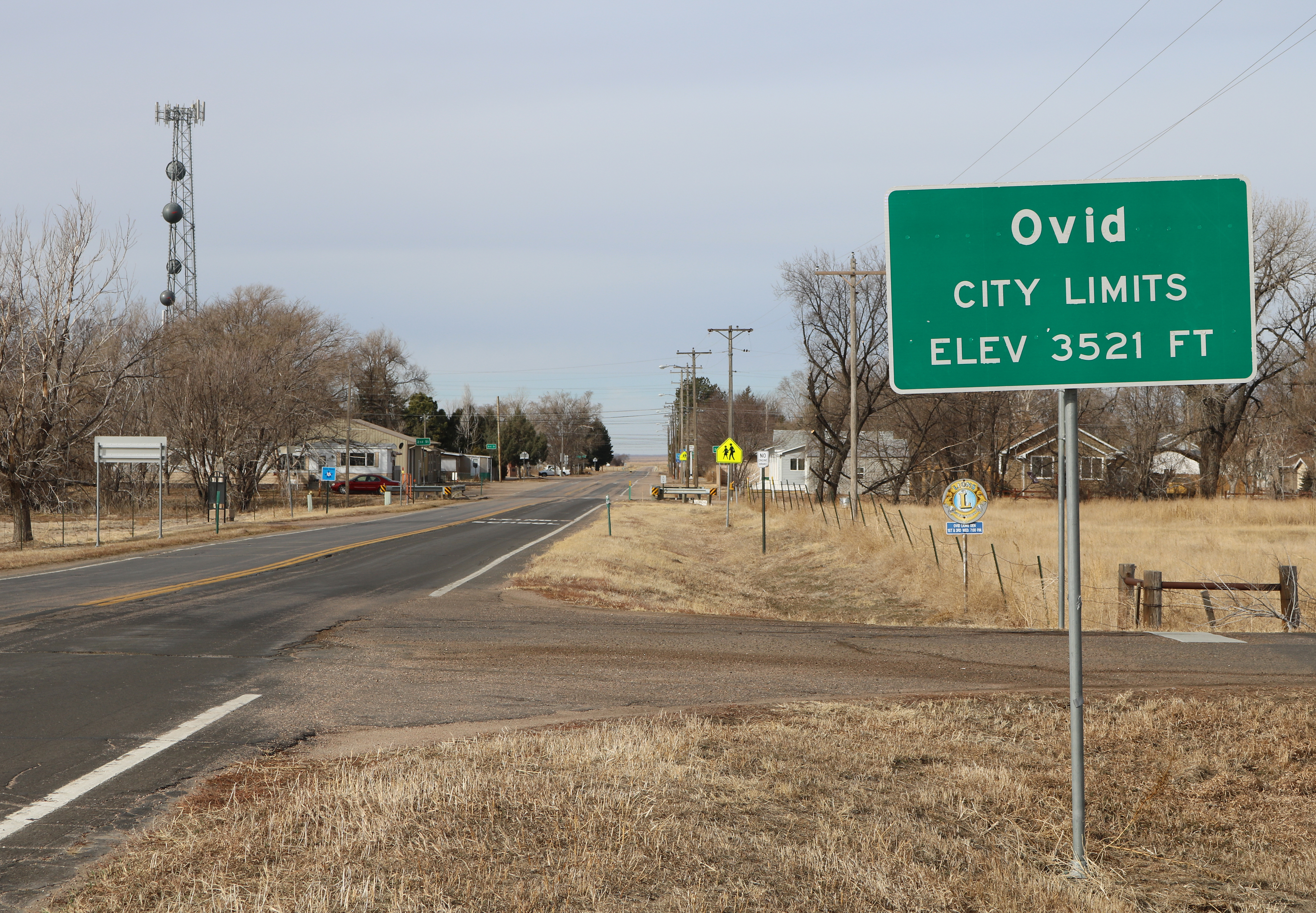
- Entering from east on U.S. Route 138 (2017)

- Location within Sedgwick County and Colorado
- Coordinates: 40°57′39″N 102°23′18″W
- Country: United States
- State: Colorado
- County: Sedgwick
- Incorporated: December 21, 1925

Area
  - Total: 0.15 sq mi (0.40 km^{2})
  - Land: 0.15 sq mi (0.40 km^{2})
  - Water: 0 sq mi (0.00 km^{2})
- Elevation: 3,530 ft (1,080 m)

Population (2020)
  - Total: 271
  - Density: 1,800/sq mi (680/km^{2})
- Time zone: UTC−7 (MST)
  - Summer (DST): UTC−6 (MDT)
- ZIP Code: 80744
- Area code: 970
- FIPS code: 08-56475
- GNIS ID: 182695
- Website: Town website

Ovid is a statutory town in Sedgwick County, Colorado, United States. The population was 271 at the 2020 census.

== History ==
The town was named after Newton Ovid, a local resident.

== Geography ==
Ovid is located at 40°57′36″N 102°23′20″W (40.959919, -102.388851).

According to the United States Census Bureau, the town has a total area of 0.2 square miles (0.52 km^{2}), all of it land.

== Demographics ==
Historical population
Census	Pop.	Note	%±
1930	649		—
1940	687		5.9%
1950	664		−3.3%
1960	571		−14.0%
1970	463		−18.9%
1980	439		−5.2%
1990	349		−20.5%
2000	330		−5.4%
2010	318		−3.6%
2020	271		−14.8%

== See also ==
- Index of Colorado-related articles
