= Simpson E. Stilwell =

Simpson Everett Stilwell
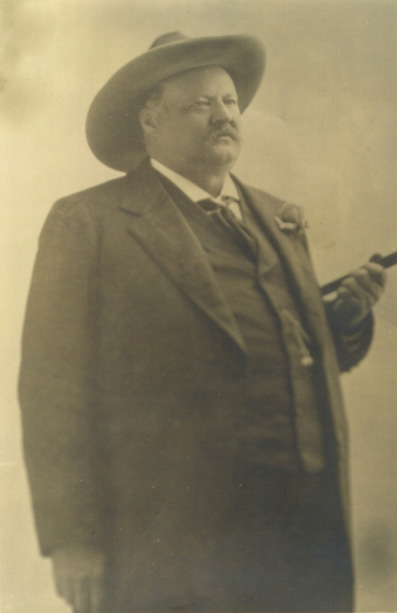
- Simpson E. Stilwell
- Born: Simpson Edwin Stilwell; September 18, 1850; Iowa City, Iowa
- Died: February 17, 1903 (aged 52); Cody, Wyoming
- Other names: Jack, Comanche Jack
- Occupations: U.S. Army Scout, lawman, judge
- Known for: Brought relief to besieged U.S. Army scout unit
- Spouse: Esther Hannah White
- Parent(s): William "Henry" Stilwell, Charlotte B. "Sarah" Winfrey

Simpson Everett Stilwell (August 18, 1850 – February 24, 1903) was a United States Army Scout, Deputy U.S. Marshal, police judge, and U.S. Commissioner in Oklahoma during the American Old West. He served in Major George A. Forsyth's company of scouts when it was besieged during the Battle of Beecher Island by Indian Cheyenne Chief Roman Nose and was instrumental in bringing relief to the unit.

== Early life ==
Stilwell was raised near Baldwin, Kansas. His parents were William "Henry" Stilwell and Charlotte B. "Sarah" Winfrey. He had a younger brother, Frank Stilwell, who was killed at age 26 by Deputy U.S. Marshal Wyatt Earp.

In the mid-1850s the Stilwells moved to Baldwin City or Palmyra Township, Douglas County, Kansas, where they took a land claim. In 1863 William and Charlotte divorced and William left with the three boys, Jack, Millard and Frank. Charlotte took the girls Elizabeth and Mary. William joined Company B, 18th Missouri Infantry for a time during the Civil War.

In 1863, at 14 years old, Simpson's parents sent him to fetch water from the family well. He left for Kansas City instead, where he joined a wagon train bound for Santa Fe, New Mexico Territory. He traveled between New Mexico, Kansas City, and Leavenworth several times, spending the winters in New Mexico.

== Joins U.S. Army ==
During the winters he joined others on buffalo hunts on the Canadian River, the Wolf River, and the Beaver River. In the spring he worked the wagon trains. In 1867 he joined the U.S. Army and served as post guide for troops at Fort Dodge, Kansas. In 1868, he headed south with General George Custer's expedition into Indian Territory.

=== Scouts for General Forsyth ===
On August 28, 1868, Jack Stilwell joined Major George A. Forsyth's company, one of fifty U.S. Army scouts from Fort Harker and Fort Hays. Jack was described as "a youth of six feet three or more, short of years but long on frontier lore."

On the morning of September 10, Forsyth's troops at Fort Wallace received information that Cheyenne Indians had attacked a freighter's train 13 kilometres (8.1 mi) east of Ft Wallace. The soldiers set out at dawn to find the hostile Indians. The scouts trailed the Indian raiding party from Sheridan, Indian Territory into Colorado; signs indicated that the opposing force considerably outnumbered the scouts, but the unit nonetheless pressed on.

The detachment went into camp on the Arikaree Fork of the Republican River. General Forsyth anticipated trouble and posted a watch. At dawn the Scouts were attacked by a large party of Cheyennes under the leadership of Roman Nose. Surrounded, the men took cover and dug in on a sand bar in the dry riverbed.

At around midnight on the first day of battle, Forsyth said, "Some one must go to Wallace for assistance." Stilwell volunteered and said he would choose a man to go with him. Forsyth tore the fly leaf out of his daybook, wrote a note to Col. Bankhead at Ft. Wallace, and gave it to Stilwell. Stilwell and Trudeau crawled for 3 miles (4.8 km) before they took cover for the day about 5 miles (8.0 km) of one of the Indian Villages. They took horse meat for food, and when it spoiled they got sick. Trudeau was so weak he could only stand with assistance, but after resting and traveling for four days they reached Fort Wallace.

There were some reports written much later that gave Stilwell credit for shooting Roman Nose, but this could not be proven. The scouts were discharged at Fort Wallace on October 5, 1868. Stilwell remained a scout for the army for a length of time.

=== Guides Kansas Volunteers ===
Samuel Johnson Crawford was elected Governor of Kansas and served from 1865 to 1868. He was unable to receive the support he'd hoped for from the federal government, who was still shipping arms to the Indians in keeping with several treaties.

After receiving constant appeals for aid, on November 4, 1868, Governor Crawford resigned as governor and was appointed Colonel of a newly recruited regiment, the 1200 strong Nineteenth Kansas Volunteers. General Sheridan gave Crawford instructions to rendezvous with General George Armstrong Custer's 7th Cavalry at Camp Supply, near the point of the Wold and Beaver Rivers. Custer was under orders to proceed to the Washita River, the winter encampment of Indians.

General Sheridan had sent two guides to lead Colonel Crawford through. Jack Stilwell and either William "Apache Bill" Seamans or Pierre Trudeau were assigned to the Kansas Volunteers as Scouts. Wichita resident James R. Mead wrote afterward that he talked to Stilwell and Tredeau and learned they had never been over the routes. He then went to Colonel Crawford and told him it was very dangerous to start across there at that time of year with inexperienced guides and offered to furnish a man who knew the country. Colonel Crawford replied, "I have no funds to employ scouts so I must trust the scouts that Sheridan sends." Sure enough, just as Mead predicted, they got lost. A big snow storm overtook them. Forage and rations were exhausted. The men suffered much and many of the horses froze to death on the picket line.

The Regiment began their trip Southward to Fort Supply where Custer and the 7th Cavalry was posted. After crossing the nearly frozen Arkansas River they began their tracking of the hostiles. The snow being around 12 inches deep, made it very difficult for the men and their horses, to travel, so their travels were very slow. On the 14th of November, the regiment was hit by a severe winter snowstorm and they had great difficulty finding a way to cross the Arkansas River. Shortly afterward 600 of their horses were somehow stampeded and they lost 100 of the valuable horses. The situation got worse when the men got lost in a blizzard in the Cimarron Canyon and finally began reaching Camp Supply on November 28.

Custer had grown impatient waiting for Crawford and left on November 24 for Washita. There they killed from 14 to upwards of 140 Indians at the Battle of Washita River, capturing 53 women and children, while losing only one officer in the fight around the Indian village. This was the battle for which the unit had been organized.

The Kansas Volunteers remained in active service all winter. They suffered from insufficient and poor rations, severe weather, and walked instead of rode due to the lack of horses, and saw little fighting.

In 1871 Stilwell was at Fort Sill as a post guide. He remained in the Indian Territory with the exception of a few travels until about 1887.

He also served during the campaign of 1874, where he made a daring ride from the Darlington agency to Fort Sill, seventy-five miles alone through hostile country, to bring news of the outbreak and get help. Later he was scout for General "Black Jack" Davidson.

In 1878 he was chief packer and then scout at Fort Davis and then Fort Stockton, Texas.

== Brother shot in Tucson ==
His brother Frank Stilwell was an outlaw Cowboy who was suspected of murdering Morgan Earp on March 18, 1882, in an ambush in Tombstone, Arizona Territory. Frank was killed in retaliation by Wyatt Earp two days later. Simpson soon learned of his brother's death and went west with hopes of avenging his brother's death. However, he soon returned without doing so. He returned to Indian Territory where he became a Deputy U.S. Marshal headquartered in Anadarko, Oklahoma.

== Becomes U.S. Marshal ==
In 1887 (actually was commissioned by the Northern District of Texas first in 1885 and then by the District of Kansas about 1887), Stilwell became a Deputy U.S. Marshall in Darlington, Oklahoma during the period when Oklahoma was opened up for settlement. He soon became a police judge at El Reno, Oklahoma about 6 miles (9.7 km) away. In March 1894, Stilwell was a witness in the case The United States vs. The State of Texas which determined Greer County was within the borders of Oklahoma Territory. A few years later he returned to Anadarko where he was appointed U.S. Commissioner. He was admitted to the bar and practiced law.

On May 2, 1895, in Braddock, Pennsylvania, he married Esther Hannah White. In 1898, Stilwell was invited by longtime friend William F. "Buffalo Bill" Cody to move to his ranch near Cody, Wyoming. Stilwell watched over Cody's interests while he toured with his Wild West shows. Stilwell owned a small ranch on the South Fork of the Shoshone River, where he died of Bright's disease in 1903. He was buried near Cody, Wyoming.
