= Arikaree River =

River in Colorado, Kansas, and Nebraska, U.S.

Arikaree River Arikara Fork Republican River
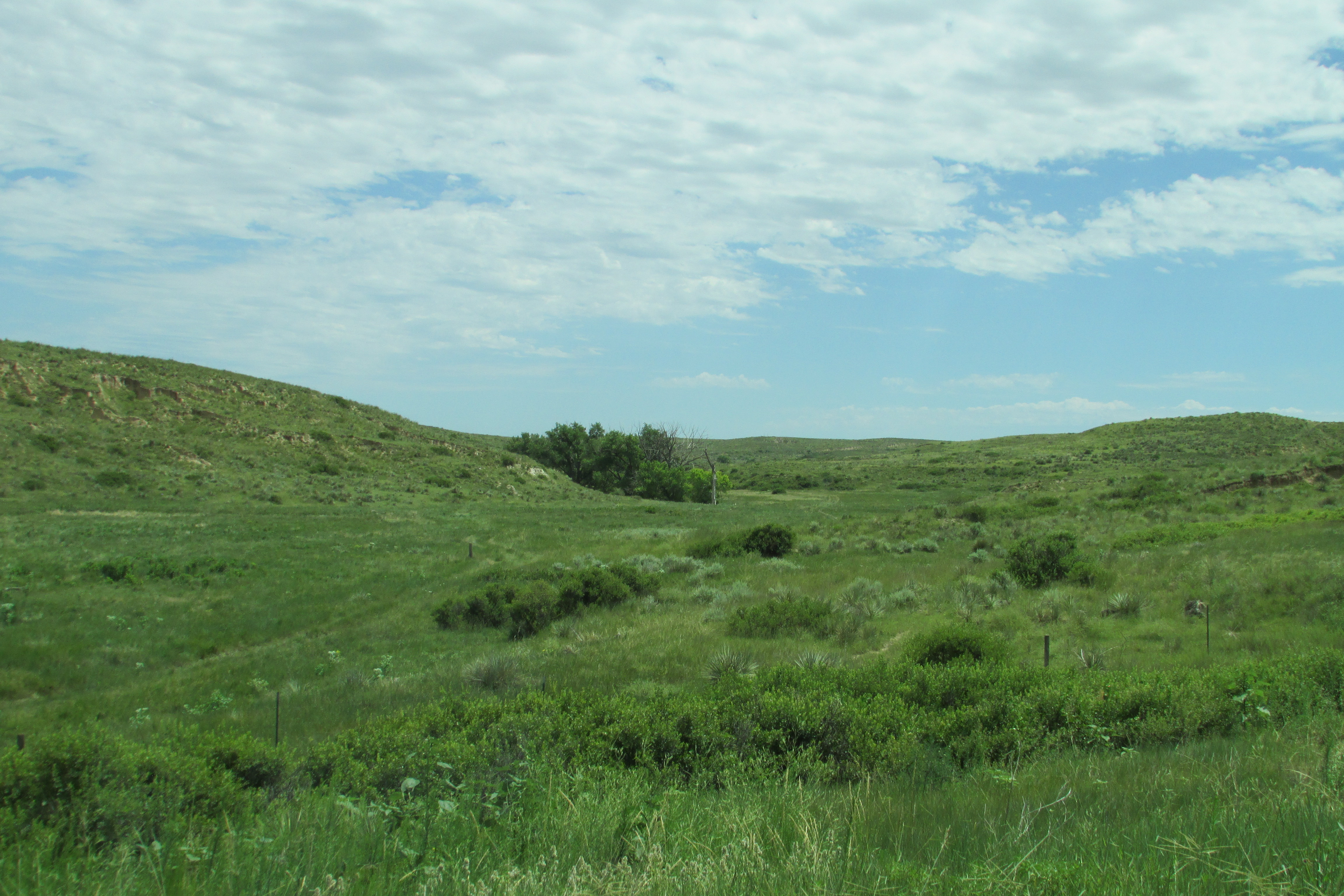
- Arikaree River Valley at the location of the Battle of Beecher Island near Wray, Colorado

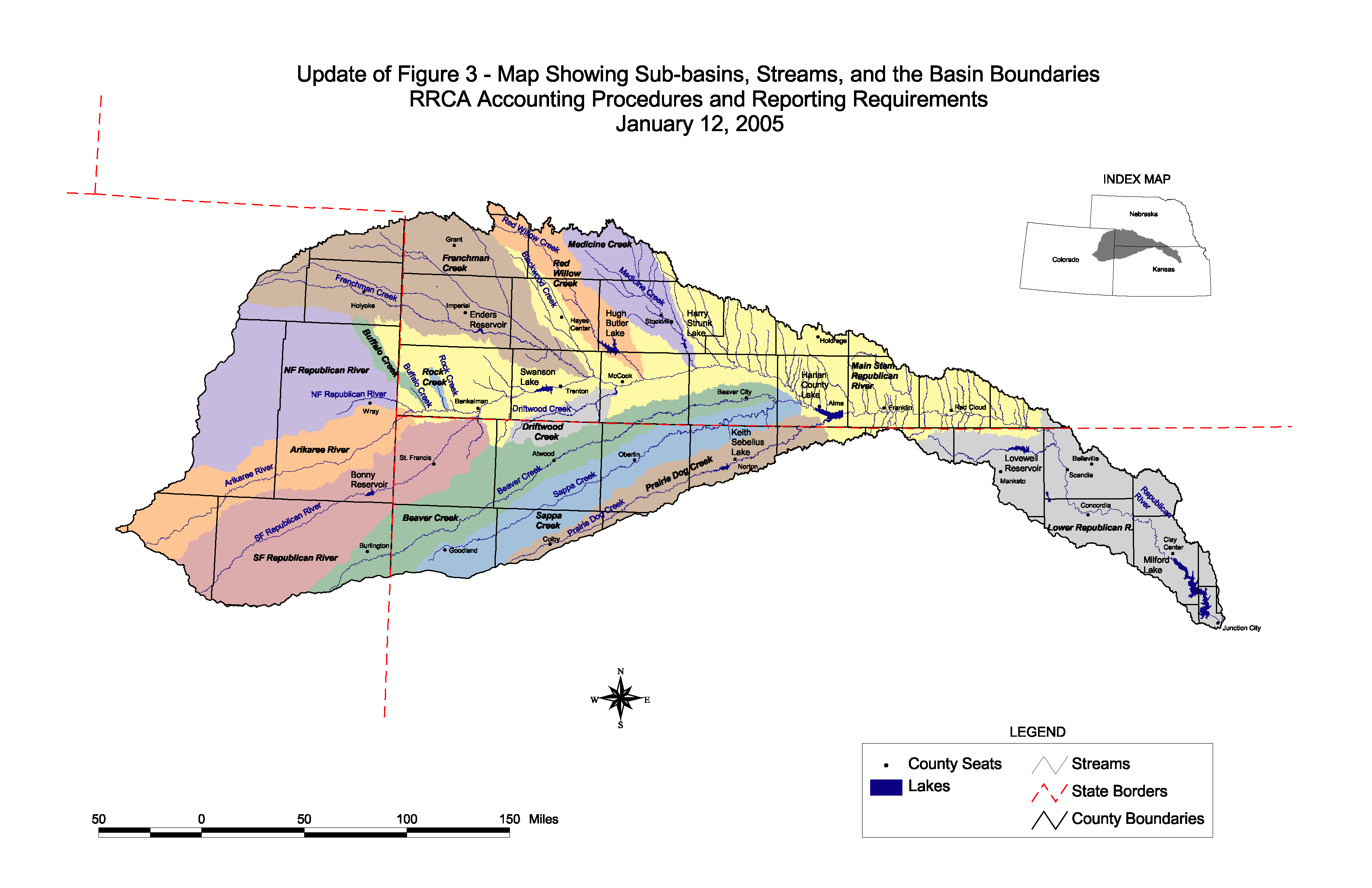
- Republican River watershed; the Arikaree is in orange at far left
- Etymology: Arikaree for "horn"
- Native name: Ononio'he (Arikara)

Location
- Country: United States
- State: Colorado, Kansas, Nebraska

Physical characteristics
- Source
  - location: Elbert County, Colorado
  - coordinates: 39°22′36″N 103°46′44″W
  - elevation: 5,908 ft (1,801 m)
- Mouth: Republican River
  - location: Haigler, Nebraska
  - coordinates: 40°01′13″N 101°56′17″W
  - elevation: 3,241 ft (988 m)
- Length: 156 mi (251 km)
- Basin size: 1,743 sq mi (4,510 km^{2})
- Discharge
  - location: USGS 06821500 at Haigler, NE
  - average: 16.7 cu ft/s (0.47 m^{3}/s)
  - minimum: 0 cu ft/s (0 m^{3}/s)
  - maximum: 17,000 cu ft/s (480 m^{3}/s)

Basin features
- Tributaries
  - left: North Fork Arikaree River - Black Wolf Creek
- Watersheds: Arikaree-North Fork Republican River-Republican-Kansas- Missouri-Mississippi

The Arikaree River /əˈrɪkəri/ is a 156-mile-long (251 km) river in the central Great Plains of North America. It lies mostly in the American state of Colorado, draining land between the North and South Forks of the Republican River, and it flows into the North Fork in Nebraska after flowing a short distance through Kansas. It is a designated area within the Colorado Natural Areas Program to protect native and uncommon species that may be endangered or threatened.

The Arikaree River is shrinking due to groundwater pumping at a rate that exceeds the recharge rate of the Ogallala Aquifer, from which the Arikaree River is fed. It is estimated that the Arikaree River will dry about one-half mile by 2045.

== Name ==
The river is named after the Arikara Native Americans, whose name is believed to mean "horn." The name also could mean "elk people" or "corn eaters".

== Geography ==
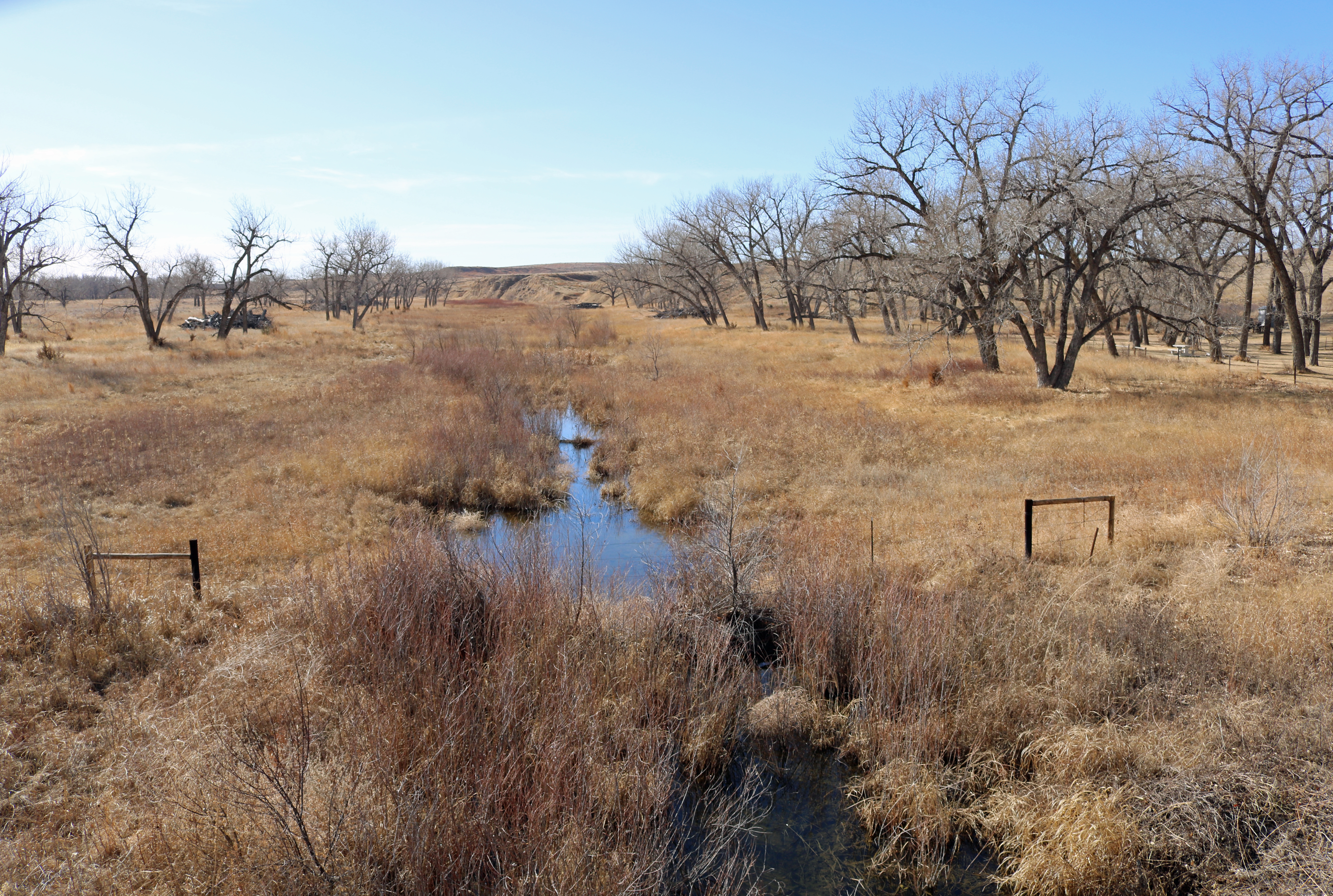
The Arikaree River at the Colorado–Kansas border, which is the lowest point in the state of Colorado

The source of the Arikaree River is in extreme eastern Elbert County, Colorado on the western edge of the High Plains region of the Great Plains. From there, the river flows generally northeast across the High Plains in eastern Colorado. It then crosses the extreme northwestern corner of Kansas before entering far southwestern Nebraska. At the town of Haigler, the Arikaree enters the North Fork Republican River. The point where the Arikaree River flows out of Yuma County, Colorado and into Cheyenne County, Kansas, located at 39°58′41″N 102°03′06″W, is the lowest point in Colorado at an elevation of 3,317 feet (1,011 m). It holds the distinction of being the highest low point of any U.S. state, higher than the highest points of 18 states and the District of Columbia.

== History ==
Along the river is the site of the 1868 Battle of Beecher Island, which was fought on the small sandbar later named Beecher Island in the middle of the Arikaree River. The battle took place in what is now Yuma County, Colorado. It was considered a loss for the Arapaho, Cheyenne, and Sioux tribes, with a confirmed 9 Native Americans killed and an unknown number of casualties taken, alongside a loss of the leader Roman Nose. The Battle of Beecher Island is commemorated annually by the Beecher Island Park and Memorial Association.

== Arikaree River Natural Area ==
The Arikaree River has been made one of the designated areas under the Colorado Natural Areas Program because it is "part of the largest and best remaining example of a naturally functioning Great Plains river system in Colorado." It has several species of reptiles, fish, and amphibians that are native and uncommon. The area serves as a sanctuary for numerous bird species, including burrowing owls, ferruginous hawks, and greater prairie chickens. The habitat is nearly pristine, featuring high-quality riparian and native prairie plants.

== See also ==
- Arikaree Breaks
- Beecher Island
- Battle of Beecher Island
- List of Colorado rivers
- List of Kansas rivers
- List of Nebraska rivers
