= Edmond Butler =

- Edmond Butler
- Born: 1827; Ireland
- Died: August 21, 1895 (aged 67–68); France
- Burial place: Holy Sepulchre Cemetery, Omaha, Nebraska
- Military career
- Allegiance: United States of America; Union
- Branch: United States Army; Union Army
- Service years: 1861–1891
- Rank: Lieutenant Colonel
- Unit: 5th U.S. Infantry Regiment
- Conflicts: American Civil War; Indian Wars
- Awards: Medal of Honor

Edmund or Edmond Butler (March 19, or September 19, 1827 – August 21, 1895) was a U.S. Army officer who served with the Union Army during the American Civil War and later became a prominent Indian fighter in the Northern Plains, Rocky Mountains and southwest United States in the post-Civil War era. In 1894, he was awarded the Medal of Honor for gallantry against the Sioux and Cheyenne at Battle of Wolf Mountain.

== Biography ==
Edmond Butler was born in Ireland and immigrated to the United States as a young man. Shortly after arriving in Brooklyn, New York, he enlisted in the U.S. Army and commissioned as a second lieutenant in the 5th U.S. Infantry in October 1861. He was also assigned to special duty with the inspector of volunteer units in Kansas and Missouri.

In 1862, he was sent to the New Mexico Territory and later assisted in the reconstruction of Fort Bliss after its recapture by the Union. Promoted to captain in 1864, he was eventually reassigned to Fort Wingate, New Mexico and, in 1865, commanded an expedition against the Navajos living in Canyon de Chelly. Intercepting a Navajo raiding party under Manuelito Grande, he recovered a number of sheep and other livestock taken from the neighboring Apache. After a period of 22 days, in which he had covered 720 miles, 31 Navajos were killed while another 27 were captured. He was also involved in the relocation of 3,000 Navajo to the Fort Sumner Reservation on the Pecos River.

Transferred to Kansas in 1866, he spent two years there before being assigned to the Beecher Island-site in December 1868 to bring in the bodies of the soldiers killed during the Battle of Beecher Island. Despite a large Sioux presence in the area, Butler successfully removed the bodies from the site despite being "under the fire of the main body of Sioux". However, he was unable to find the remains of Lieutenant Fredrick H. Beecher and Acting Surgeon J.H. Mooer, suggesting their bodies had been removed by the Sioux "probably in revenge for rifling Sioux graves on the Republican (earlier by camp followers)".

During 1869, while assigned to guard the Fort Wallace–Denver stage route, Butler volunteered to join an expedition under Lieutenant Colonel Charles R. Woods against the Pawnees.

Returning to Kansas in October 1871, he was assigned to operations to control "organized land-leaguers" in the southeast. Three years later, he served with Lieutenant General Nelson A. Miles during the Red River Campaign and in the Black Hills War in which he led six companies in pursuit of Sitting Bull. Although Sitting Bull and Gall escaped to Canada, he was involved in the capture of eight other Sioux chieftains and around 700 lodges.

On January 8, 1877, Butler took part in the engagement against the Sioux at Wolf Mountain. In command of Company C, he was commended for his actions during the battle for "conspicuous gallantry in leading his command against greatly superior numbers of hostile Indians, strongly entrenched" and receiving a brevet of major and awarded the Medal of Honor.

Later that year, he escorted Chief Joseph and other Nez Perce to Fort Buford between October and November 1877. During the early 1880s, he was stationed at Fort Snelling, Minnesota and Fort Keogh, Montana and guarded construction parties of the Northern Pacific Railroad. He also held numerous staff positions and eventually awarded the rank of lieutenant colonel on the day of his retirement on March 9, 1891. He died in France (in Trouville or Paris or Metz) three years later and, his body being returned to the United States, was later buried in Holy Sepulchre Cemetery in Omaha, Nebraska.

== See also ==
- List of Medal of Honor recipients
- List of Medal of Honor recipients for the Indian Wars
