= Hale, Colorado =

Unincorporated community in Yuma County, CO, USA

- Unincorporated community
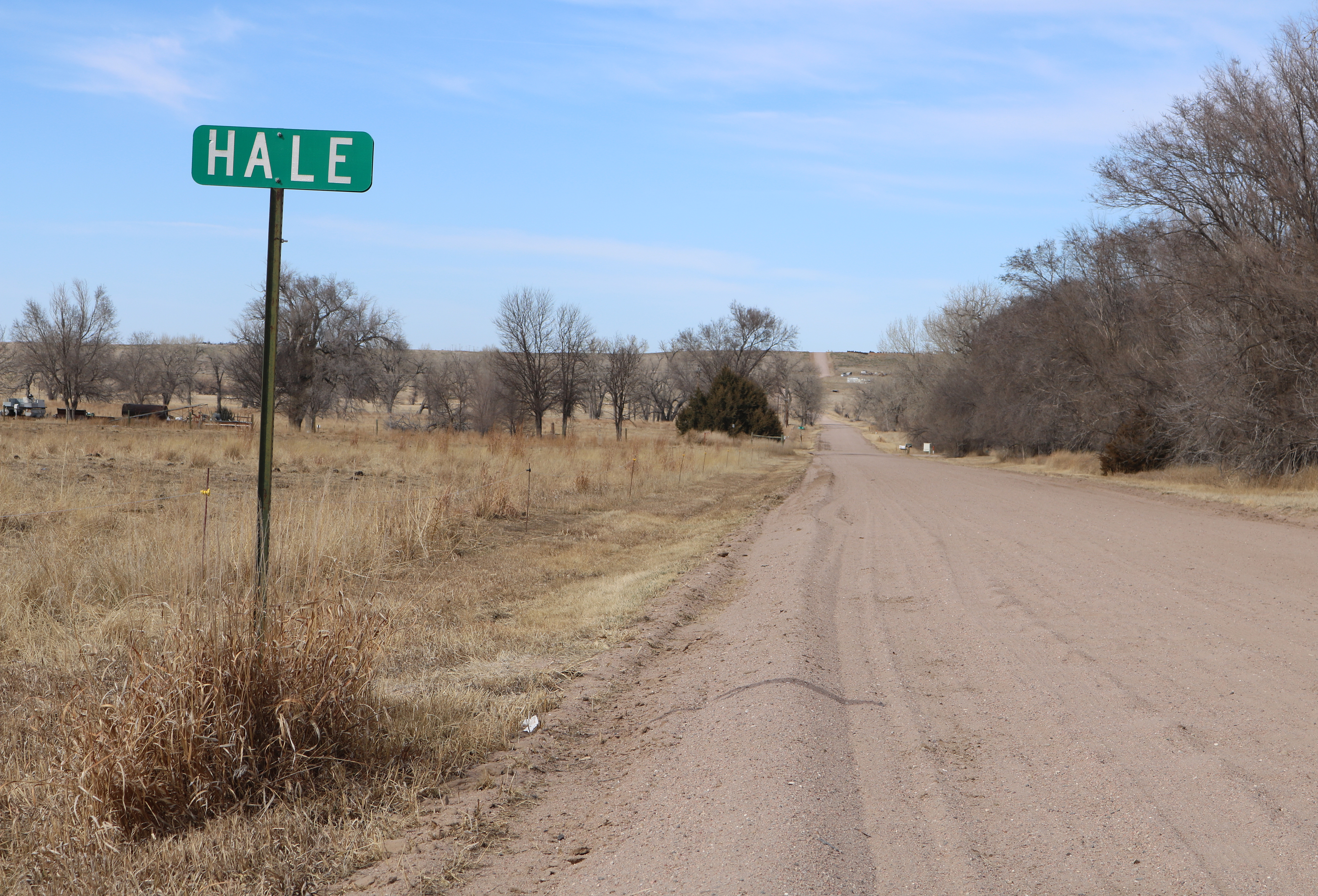
- County Road LL.5 in Hale, looking north (2017)

- Location within Colorado Location within the United States
- Coordinates: 39°37′47″N 102°08′34″W
- Country: United States
- State: Colorado
- Counties: Yuma
- Elevation: 3,606 ft (1,099 m)
- Time zone: UTC−7 (MST)
  - Summer (DST): UTC−6 (MDT)
- ZIP Code: 80735 (Idalia)
- Area code: 970
- FIPS code: 08-33805
- GNIS ID: 195046

Hale is an Unincorporated community in Yuma County, Colorado, United States. It is located along US 36.

== History ==
The U.S. Post Office at Idalia (ZIP Code 80735) now serves Hale postal addresses.
