= Cheyenne military societies =

Traditional institution of the Cheyenne nation

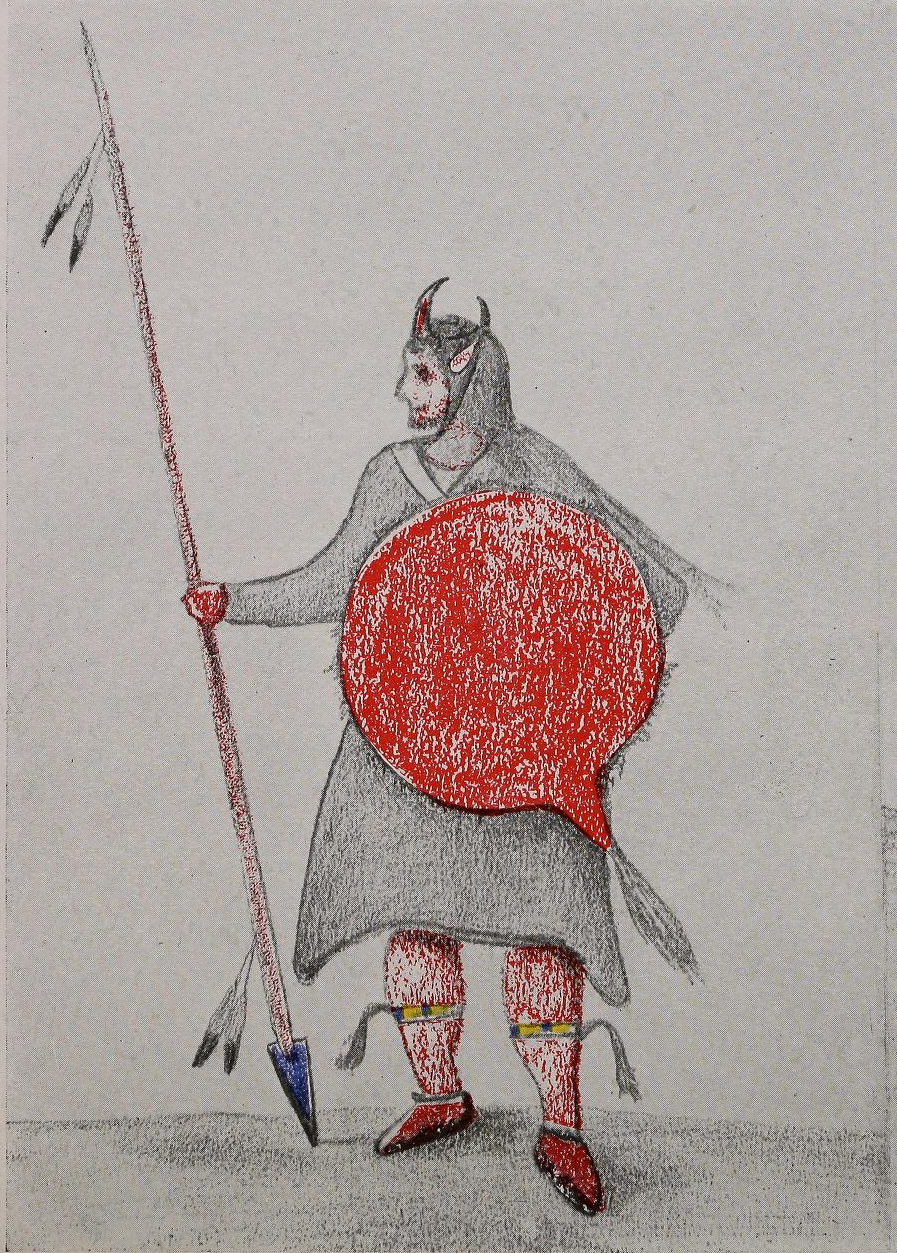
A member of the Cheyenne Soldier Society, The Red Shields

Cheyenne military societies are one of the two central institutions of traditional Cheyenne native American tribal governance, the other being the Council of Forty-four. While council chiefs are responsible for overall governance of individual bands and the tribe as a whole, the headmen of military societies are in charge of maintaining discipline within the tribe, overseeing tribal hunts and ceremonies, and providing military leadership. Historically, council chiefs selected which of the six military societies would assume these duties; after a period of time on-duty, the chiefs would select a different society to take up the duties.

== Four original societies ==
The prophet Sweet Medicine (Motsé'eóeve) was said to designate the four original Cheyenne warrior societies (pl. Nótȧxévėstotȯtse, sing. Nótȧxévestȯtse), which had their own society songs (nótȧxénootȯtse) and were governed by a head man (nótȧxévėhoneve). Over the ages, some have developed branches or have transformed.

=== Fox ===
Fox Warriors Society (Vóhkêséhetaneo'o or Monêsóonetaneo'o), also known as Swift Fox or Kitfox (sing. Mónėsóonetane, pl. Mótsėsóonetaneo'o; variant: sing. Vóhkėséhetane, pl. Vóhkėséhetaneo'o). This society is found among both the Northern and the Southern Cheyenne. The Coyote Warriors Society (O'ôhoménotâxeo'o) and Flintmen Society (sing. Mótsėsóonetane, pl. Motsêsóonetaneo'o) are branches of the Fox Warriors Society. Among the Northern Cheyenne the Kit Fox Soldiers always claimed superiority over the others. They had strong ties through marriages with Kit Fox Society (in Lakota: Toka'la) affiliated families of Lakota Sioux.

=== Elk ===
Elk Warriors Society also known as Elk Horn Scrapers (Hémo'eoxeso), Bone Scraper Society, Hoof Rattle, Crooked Lance, Headed Lance, Blue Soldiers or Medicine Lance. This society is found among both the Northern and the Southern Cheyenne. This was led by Chief White Hawk and had members like the famous warrior Roman Nose, and also of the mixed-race Cheyenne George Bent.

=== Shield ===
Shield Warriors Society (Ma'êhoohevaso), also known as Red Shield (sing. Ma'ėhoohēvȧhtse, pl. Ma'ėhoohevase - ′Redshields, lazy group. Lit: red-nails(shields)′). or Red Fox. This society was originally found in both the Northern and the Southern Cheyenne. Today it exists only among the Northern Cheyenne. Buffalo Warriors (Hotóanótâxeo'o), also known as Buffalo Bull or Bull, is a branch of the Shield Warriors Society.

=== Bowstring ===
Bowstring Men (Hema'tanónėheo'o, pl. Héma'tanóohese - ′Bowstrings, Lit: those who have bowstrings′), also known as the Owl Man's Bowstring, because it was founded by the Cheyenne warrior named Owl Man. This society was originally found in both the Northern and the Southern Cheyenne. Today it is only among the Southern Cheyenne under the alternate name Wolf Warriors Society (Ho'néhenótâxeo'o) for the Bowstring Men. The Crazy Dog Society developed out of the Bowstring Men in the 19th century through a vision given to Owl Friend. Among the Northern Cheyenne, the Wolf Warriors gradually adopted the name Crazy Dogs (Hotamémâsêhao'o). Both groups, the Wolf Warriors Society (Southern Cheyenne) and the Crazy Dogs (Northern Cheyenne), considered themselves constituents of the same organization originally called Bowstring Men. In the Northern Cheyenne tribe, both the Crazy Dogs and the Bowstrings or Wolf Warriors exist independently.

== Fifth society ==
Dog Warrior Society (Hotamétaneo'o), also known as Dog Men. This society was also called Dog Soldiers by the whites. The Dog Warrior Society was established by a directive given in a visionary dream after the prophet Sweet Medicine's departure. This society was originally found in both the Northern and the Southern Cheyenne. Today it exists only among the Southern Cheyenne.

Crazy Dogs (Hotamémâsêhao'o), also known as Foolish Dogs. This society is similar to the Bowstring Men in function, but is found only among the Northern Cheyenne. Among the Northern Cheyenne, Dog Warrior Society and Wolf Warriors merged. This resulted in the development of new Dog Warriors, now called the Crazy Dogs. The Crazy Dogs are considered by many to be a sixth society instead of a branch of the fifth society. "The...members imitate the coyote in their power of endurance, cunning and activity. They outstrip their fellow tribesmen in running long distances, playing games, etc. There are about 150 warriors in the society, and a head chief" (Dorsey, 1905, Vol. I: 19).

== Sixth society ==
Contrary Warriors Society (Hohnóhkao'o), also known as the Inverted Bow-string Society. Its members, the Contrary Warriors, have proved their bravery by riding backward into battle.

Contrary Society (sing. Hohnohka, pl. Hohnóhkao'o), also known as Clown Society. This society draws upon the same spiritual powers as the Contrary Warriors Society. It is primarily composed of Cheyenne elders and may be a mature variation of the Contrary Warriors Society. They were charged with teaching the Cheyenne ceremonial ways of the cultural "dos" and "don'ts" through humour, sarcasm and satire, in a fashion contrary to the traditional Cheyenne culture.

== Warrior Women's Society ==
Ehyophsta, who fought in the Battle of Beecher Island, was a member of a society of "women who had gone to war with their husbands". That qualification seems to be wrong since she is known to have become a warrior only when she was widowed. John Sipes Jr, late Southern Cheyenne tribal historian, mentioned that his ancestor Mochi was a warrior in her own right, had her own war pony and war medicine and was also a member of that society.
