= Harold Tabor =

American politician (1897–1977)

Harold Adelman Tabor (July 19, 1897 – April 7, 1977) was an American politician.

Tabor was born near Wray, Colorado, on July 19, 1897, to parents A. E. and Nancy Ann Tabor. He was educated in Yuma County, then left Colorado for Iowa to attend Graceland College for one year, 1917. He married Laura Lucille Curtis on November 23, 1919, with whom he raised five children.

Upon his return to Colorado, Tabor settled in Laird, where he farmed, and was elected to the Colorado House of Representatives as a Republican from 1937 to 1946. Tabor began moving eastward to Lamoni, Iowa, in 1945, where he continued farming alongside a son, Eugene. Between 1955 and 1957, Tabor held the District 6 seat in the Iowa House of Representatives.

Tabor was active in the Reorganized Church of Jesus Christ of Latter-Day Saints from his days in Colorado. He was a teacher in 1920, became a priest in 1930, an elder in 1932, and a high priest in 1942. From 1933 to 1945, Tabor was a pastor in Wray, as well as a bishop's agent. Upon moving to Lamoni, Tabor joined the Oland congregation, counseled the Lamoni Stake president from 1948 to 1958, and also served on the Lamoni Stake High Council for two decades. He died at the Decatur County Hospital in Leon on April 7, 1977.
