= Beecher Island =

Sandbar in Arikaree River in Yuma County, Colorado, United States

- Beecher Island Battleground
- U.S. National Register of Historic Places
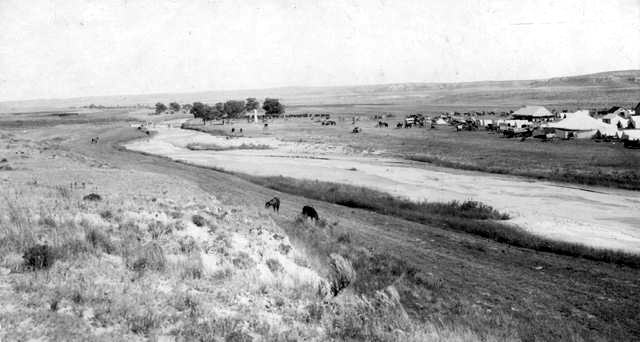
- Beecher Island in 1917: the south channel of the Arickaree River has been closed, owing to the sifting sands of the stream. The Battle of Beecher Island monument is visible in the distance.

- Location within the United States Location within Colorado
- Nearest city: Wray, Colorado
- Coordinates: 39°52′13″N 102°11′13″W
- Area: 240 acres (97 ha)
- Built: 1868
- NRHP reference No.: 76000569
- Added to NRHP: October 29, 1976

Beecher Island is a sandbar located along the lower course of the Arikaree River, a tributary of the North Fork of the Republican River near Wray in Yuma County, Colorado. The site is notable for having been the scene of an 1868 armed conflict between elements of the United States Army and several of the Plains Indian tribes. The island was named for Lt. Fredrick Henry Beecher of the 3rd Infantry (nephew of Henry Ward Beecher and veteran of the Battle of Gettysburg), one of the soldiers of the engagement who was killed during what became known as the Battle of Beecher Island. The "island" and the courses of the river have been modified by several floods since 1868.

The Battle of Beecher Island was fought along the Arickaree Fork of the Republican River with concentrated fighting on a small island. A few willow trees stood on the island; however, the banks on either side of the river were believed to have had minimal tree growth. Bluffs rise gently from the course of the river. The physical appearance of the actual battleground site was changed by a flood in 1935 which altered the river channel. A monument, erected in 1905, was swept from the island and virtually all traces of the island were destroyed. The major pieces of the monument were retrieved and have been erected on the north side of the river, overlooking picnic and camping grounds.

== Beecher Island Battleground Memorial Association ==
The Association purchased 240 acres (97 ha) at the battle site. This is a semi-arid region with native grasses, sagebrush, scrub plants, and trees along the river. The Association maintains a monument and the 1940 period auditorium, Sunday School building, kitchen hall, a one-room school house, modern showers and rest rooms, and a storage shed.

== History ==
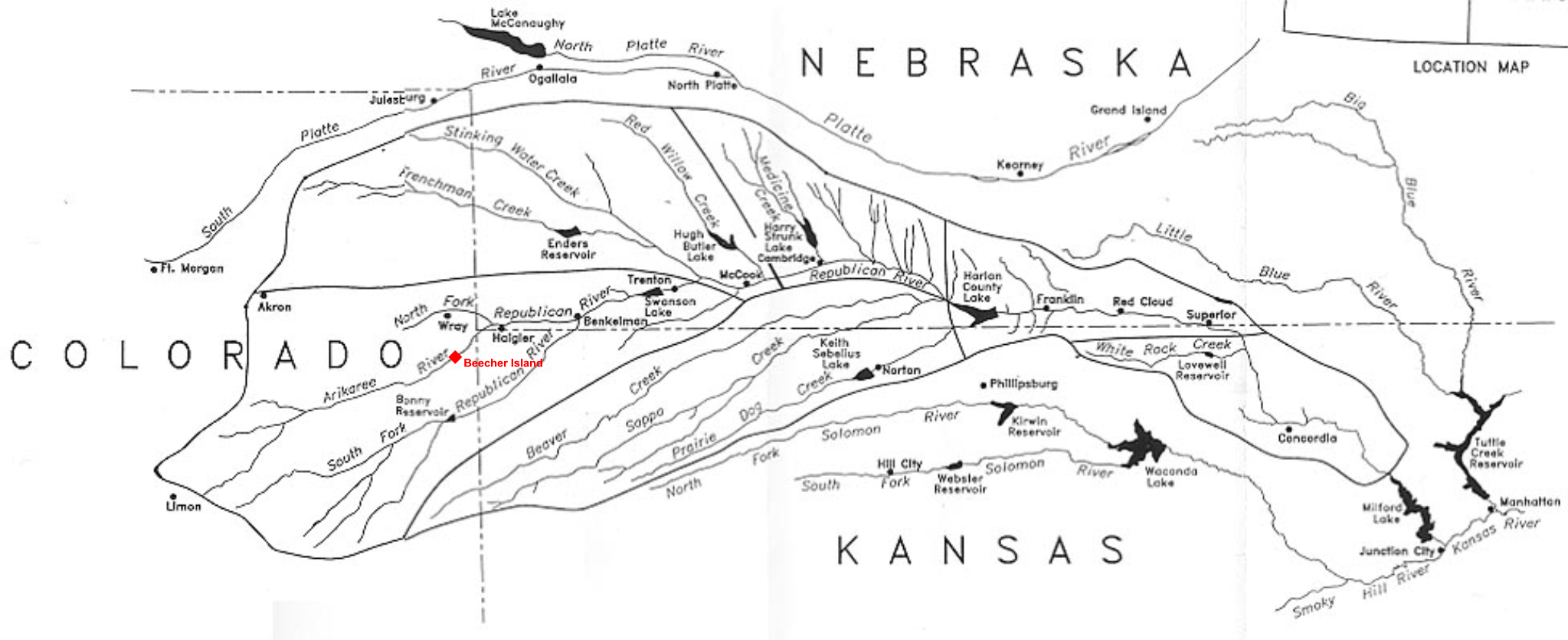
A map of the Republican River and its tributaries, with Beecher Island highlighted in red.

Westward immigration in the 1860s broke the treaties between the Great Plains tribes and the United States. The Cheyenne, Arapahoe, and Sioux Indians saw their hunting grounds being overrun by trails and homesteads. Alarmed, they began sporadic raids against settlers in 1864–1868.

Major George "Sandy" Forsyth was commissioned to take fifty frontiersmen and locate the Indians doing the raiding. On the afternoon of September 16, 1868, an Indian trail was found and the troop followed it towards an encampment. Sioux scouts alerted their warriors nearby to the threat. The Indians were located on the Arikaree Fork of the Republican River. Roman Nose, Indian war leader, was among those in the camp. The Forsyth setup camp on the south side of the Arickaree Fork. Toward dawn, Indian scouts happened onto the camp. Fighting began and reinforcements were called from the Indian camps.

Forsyth organized a defense on the low-lying island in the Arickaree. Protected by hastily dug rifle pits, Forsyth and his men held out for nine days. Six scouts were killed and fifteen, including Forsyth, were injured. Scouts were sent out at night to bring help from Fort Wallace.

Because his invulnerability had been damaged earlier, Roman Nose held back from the battle as he performed the rituals to restore his power. While watching the battle from a bluff, he was hit by rifle fire and died from his wounds. Indian losses are unknown and the numbers disputed.

The island was named in honor of Lieutenant Fred Beecher, who was killed during the engagement.

== Town ==
The Beecher, Colorado, post office operated from August 12, 1887, until November 3, 1905. The post office reopened as Glory on November 13, 1924, but was renamed Beecher Island on February 1, 1925. The Beecher Island, Colorado, post office closed on May 31, 1958.

== See also ==
  - List of battles fought in Colorado
  - List of ghost towns in Colorado
  - List of National Register of Historic Places in Yuma County, Colorado
