= Arikaree Breaks =

Landforms in Colorado, Kansas, and Nebraska, U.S.

Coordinates: 39°59′12″N 101°47′29″W

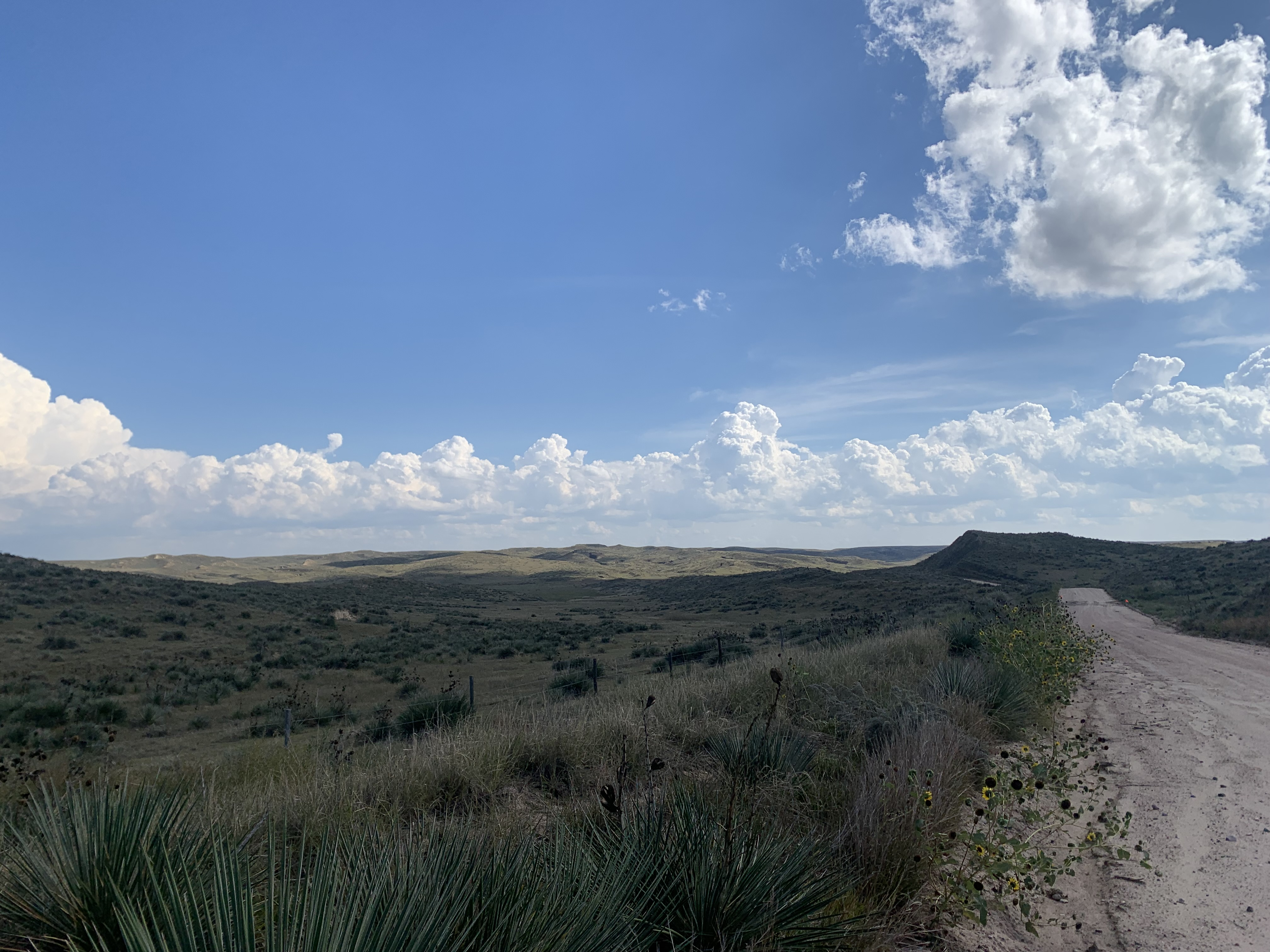
Arikaree Breaks in southwestern Nebraska facing south into Kansas.

The Arikaree Breaks are badlands primarily in northwest Kansas, but also extend some into eastern Colorado and southwestern Nebraska. They form a two-to-three-mile-wide break of rough terrain among the Great Plains in the Arikaree and Republican river basins.

The Arikaree Breaks were carved by water. The soil here, called Loess, exists in deposits as high as 100 feet (30 m). Other formations include deep ravines and vertical cliffs. The only access is by unpaved roads.
