= George Alexander Forsyth =

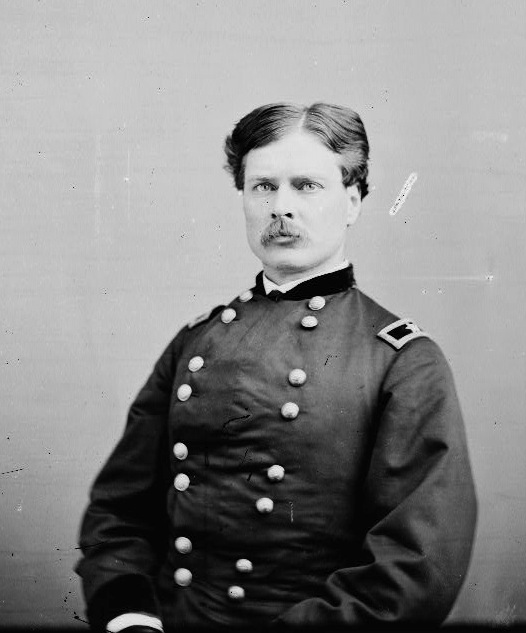
- Brevet Brig. Gen. George A. Forsyth
- Born: November 7, 1837; Muncy, Pennsylvania, US
- Died: September 12, 1915 (aged 77); Rockport, Massachusetts, US
- Burial place: Arlington National Cemetery
- Military career
- Allegiance: United States of America; Union
- Branch: U.S. Regular Army; Union Army
- Service years: 1861–1890
- Rank: Colonel; Brevet Brigadier General
- Nickname: Sandy
- Units: 8th Illinois Cavalry; 9th U.S. Cavalry; 4th U.S. Cavalry
- Conflicts: American Civil War; American Indian Wars

George Alexander Forsyth (November 7, 1837, – September 12, 1915) was a United States military officer most notable for his service in the cavalry.

== Early life ==
Forsyth was born in Muncy, Pennsylvania. He attended Canandaigua Academy and moved to Illinois before the American Civil War.

== Civil War ==
Forsyth enlisted on April 19, 1861, as a private in Barker's Company, Chicago Volunteer Dragoons (a 3-month regiment) and mustered out on August 18, 1861.

He received a commission as a first lieutenant in the 8th Illinois Cavalry on September 18, 1861, followed by promotions to captain on February 12, 1862, and major on September 1, 1863. He saw action in all major campaigns fought by the Army of the Potomac. He also fought in many cavalry actions in the Shenandoah Valley, where he served as aide-de-camp to Maj. Gen. Philip Sheridan and received a brevet promotion to colonel on October 19, 1864, for his service at Third Winchester and Cedar Creek. He was appointed a brevet brigadier general of volunteers on March 13, 1865, part of widespread ceremonial promotion of officers at the end of the war.

After the Civil War ended, he received a commission in the regular army as a major in the 9th U.S. Cavalry on July 28, 1866, with brevets on March 2, 1867, to lieutenant colonel for gallantry during the Civil War at the Battle of Dinwiddie Court House and to colonel for the Battle of Five Forks.

== Postbellum career ==
In 1868, Forsyth raised a band of fifty frontiersmen to serve as scouts into Indian Territory. He led this group to victory at the Battle of Beecher Island against Roman Nose. For this action, he received a brevet promotion to brigadier general effective September 18, 1868. Between 1869 and 1873, he served as military secretary to Lt. Gen. Sheridan, and between 1878 and 1881 as Sheridan's aide-de-camp. In his permanent rank, he received a promotion to lieutenant colonel of the 4th U.S. Cavalry on June 26, 1881.

On April 23, 1885, at Fort Bowie, Arizona, he married Natalie Sedgewick Beaumont, the twenty-two-year-old daughter of fellow 4th Cavalry officer Eugene B. Beaumont.

Forsyth retired from the Army in March 1890 and was promoted to colonel on the Retired List in April 1904. He died at Rockport, Massachusetts, and was buried in Arlington National Cemetery. He was the author of the 1900 work, Thrilling Days in Army Life.
