= Joes, Colorado =

Census-designated place in Yuma County, CO, USA

- Census-designated place
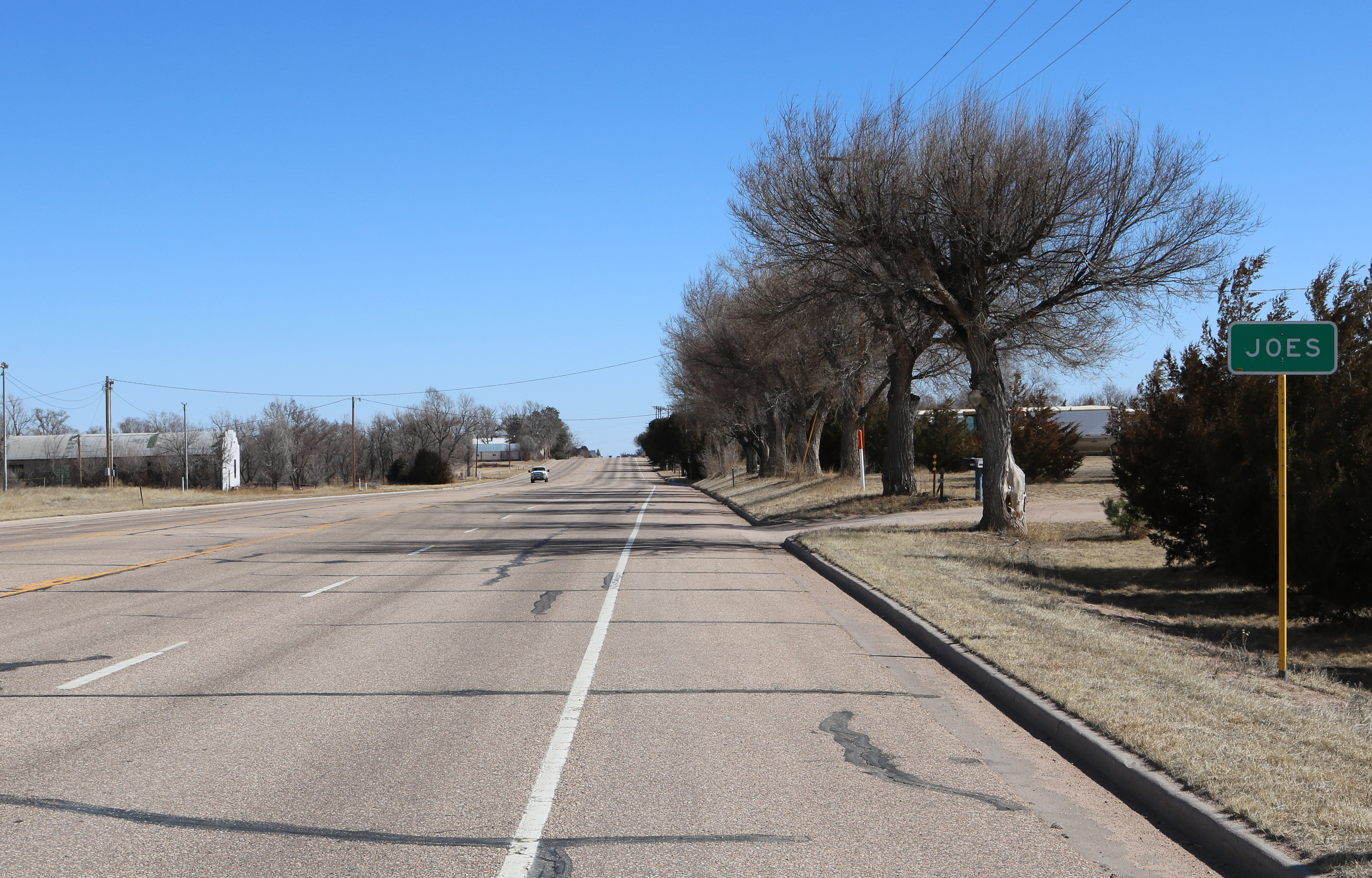
- Looking east on U.S. Route 36 (2017)

- Location within Yuma County and Colorado
- Coordinates: 39°39′21″N 102°40′43″W
- Country: United States
- State: Colorado
- County: Yuma

Area
  - Total: 2.088 sq mi (5.408 km^{2})
  - Land: 2.085 sq mi (5.401 km^{2})
  - Water: 0.0027 sq mi (0.007 km^{2})
- Elevation: 4,275 ft (1,303 m)

Population (2020)
  - Total: 82
  - Density: 39/sq mi (15/km^{2})
- Time zone: UTC−7 (MST)
  - Summer (DST): UTC−6 (MDT)
- ZIP Code: 80822
- Area code: 970
- FIPS code: 08-39745
- GNIS ID: 2583253

Joes is a census-designated place (CDP) in Yuma County, Colorado, United States. As of the United States Census 2020, its population was 82.

== History ==
The Joes post office has been in operation since 1912. The post office has the ZIP Code 80822. The community was named for the fact a share of the first settlers were named Joe.

== Geography ==
The Joes CDP has an area of 1,336 acres (5.408 km^{2}), including 1.7 acres (0.007 km^{2}) of water. Joes is home to Liberty High School.

=== Climate ===
Climate data for Joes, Colorado (1991–2020 normals, extremes 1980–2022)
Month	Jan	Feb	Mar	Apr	May	Jun	Jul	Aug	Sep	Oct	Nov	Dec	Year
Record high °F (°C)	77 (25)	81 (27)	87 (31)	92 (33)	99 (37)	111 (44)	109 (43)	112 (44)	102 (39)	94 (34)	85 (29)	80 (27)	112 (44)
Mean daily maximum °F (°C)	43.5 (6.4)	45.8 (7.7)	56.6 (13.7)	63.9 (17.7)	73.2 (22.9)	84.7 (29.3)	89.4 (31.9)	87.5 (30.8)	80.9 (27.2)	67.2 (19.6)	53.8 (12.1)	44.1 (6.7)	65.9 (18.8)
Daily mean °F (°C)	29.4 (−1.4)	31.9 (−0.1)	41.4 (5.2)	48.8 (9.3)	58.9 (14.9)	69.8 (21.0)	74.8 (23.8)	72.9 (22.7)	64.9 (18.3)	51.5 (10.8)	39.3 (4.1)	30.3 (−0.9)	51.2 (10.7)
Mean daily minimum °F (°C)	15.4 (−9.2)	18.0 (−7.8)	26.2 (−3.2)	33.6 (0.9)	44.7 (7.1)	54.9 (12.7)	60.1 (15.6)	58.2 (14.6)	49.0 (9.4)	35.8 (2.1)	24.7 (−4.1)	16.4 (−8.7)	36.4 (2.4)
Record low °F (°C)	−20 (−29)	−24 (−31)	−8 (−22)	4 (−16)	24 (−4)	35 (2)	44 (7)	38 (3)	19 (−7)	−1 (−18)	−13 (−25)	−29 (−34)	−29 (−34)
Average precipitation inches (mm)	0.43 (11)	0.40 (10)	0.80 (20)	1.80 (46)	2.61 (66)	2.88 (73)	2.95 (75)	2.22 (56)	1.23 (31)	1.17 (30)	0.51 (13)	0.51 (13)	17.51 (445)
Average snowfall inches (cm)	5.3 (13)	3.8 (9.7)	4.6 (12)	3.3 (8.4)	0.4 (1.0)	0.0 (0.0)	0.0 (0.0)	0.0 (0.0)	0.4 (1.0)	2.4 (6.1)	4.0 (10)	5.8 (15)	30.0 (76)
Average precipitation days (≥ 0.01 in)	2.8	3.1	4.1	5.7	7.7	7.2	8.0	7.1	4.1	4.1	3.0	2.7	59.6
Average snowy days (≥ 0.1 in)	2.3	2.5	2.3	1.6	0.2	0.0	0.0	0.0	0.1	0.8	2.0	2.6	14.4
Source: NOAA

== Demographics ==
The United States Census Bureau initially defined the Joes CDP for the United States Census 2010.

Historical population
Census	Pop.	Note	%±
2010	80		—
2020	82		2.5%
U.S. Decennial Census

== See also ==
- List of census-designated places in Colorado
