= Vernon, Colorado =

Unincorporated community in Yuma County, CO, USA

- Census-designated place
- Location within Yuma County and Colorado
- Coordinates: 39°56′24″N 102°18′26″W
- Country: United States
- State: Colorado
- County: Yuma

Area
  - Total: 1.133 sq mi (2.934 km^{2})
  - Land: 1.132 sq mi (2.933 km^{2})
  - Water: 0.00023 sq mi (0.0006 km^{2})
- Elevation: 3,875 ft (1,181 m)

Population (2020)
  - Total: 38
  - Density: 34/sq mi (13/km^{2})
- Time zone: UTC−7 (MST)
  - Summer (DST): UTC−6 (MDT)
- ZIP Code: 80755
- Area code: 970
- FIPS code: 08-80755
- GNIS ID: 2583312

Vernon is an unincorporated town and census-designated place (CDP) in Yuma County, Colorado, United States. At the United States Census 2020, the population of the total Vernon CDP was 38.

== History ==
The Vernon Post Office has been in operation since 1892. The Vernon post office has the ZIP Code 80755.

The community was named after a local minister with the name Vernon. The Vernon CDP was demarcated in 2010 by the United States Census Bureau for its internal use.

== Geography ==
The Vernon CDP has an area of 725 acres (2.934 km^{2}), including 0.15 acres (0.0006 km^{2}) of water.

== Demographics ==
The United States Census Bureau initially defined the Vernon CDP for the United States Census 2010.

Historical population
Census	Pop.	Note	%±
2010	29		—
2020	38		31.0%
U.S. Decennial Census

== See also ==
- Colorado census designated places
