= Idalia School =

Idalia School Location of Idalia School

Location
- Idalia, Colorado 80735; United States; 39.70499°N 102.29453°W

Information
- Type: Public
- Established: 1950
- School district: Idalia Schools RJ-3
- Superintendent: Myles Johnson
- Grades: PK-12
- Colors: Maroon and white
- Athletics: 1A
- Athletics conference: YWKC
- Mascot: Wolf
- Website: Idalia School

The Idalia School is a public school that is located in the small farming and ranching community of Idalia, Colorado, United States. The school serves PK-12 students in one main building.

== History ==
The first student to graduate from the current Idalia School was Rex Dean McEwen in 1950.

Prior to the school being opened, students living in the Idalia area attended different one-room school houses such as the Browning School, Newton School, Star School, Cook School, and another Idalia School that was in a different location.

=== Timeline ===
- 1950: The first student graduated from the current Idalia School.
- 1970s: A brick wing was added to the existing school, to be used as a high school.
- 1980s: A new library and music addition were added to the school.
- 1995: The current gymnasium was built.
- 2012-2013: After community members voted to raise their property taxes, the Idalia School received the BEST grant from the State of Colorado and built a new school.

=== Athletics ===
State championships:

- Football (6-man): 1998, 2000, 2001, 2003, 2005, 2006, 2009, 2010,2025
- Girls' basketball: (1A) 2015, 2016
- Girls' track: (1A) 2007

State runner-up:

- Football (6-man): 1991, 1999, 2002, 2008
- Girls' volleyball: 2014, 2015 (1A)

=== Activities ===
- Future Farmers of America
- Future Business Leaders of America
- Idalia Youth in Community Service
- Drama
- Art
- Choir
- Music
