= Alvin, Colorado =

Unincorporated community in Colorado, United States

- unincorporated community
- Location of Alvin, Colorado. Alvin (Colorado)
- Coordinates: 40°18′28″N 102°04′33″W
- Country: United States
- State: Colorado
- County: Yuma

Government
  - Type: unincorporated community
  - Body: Yuma County
- Elevation: 3,599 ft (1,097 m)
- Time zone: UTC−07:00 (MST)
  - Summer (DST): UTC−06:00 (MDT)
- Area code: 970
- GNIS pop ID: 182950

Alvin is an unincorporated community in Yuma County, Colorado, United States.

== History ==
The Alvin, Colorado, post office operated from September 12, 1910, until February 28, 1929.

== See also ==
- List of populated places in Colorado
