= Ehyophsta =

Cheyenne woman warrior

- Heóvėsta'é'e

Personal details
- Born: c. 1826
- Died: August 1915
- Relations: Bad Faced Bull
- Parent: Stands-in-the-Timber
- Known for: Fought in the Battle of Beecher Island

Ehyophsta (possibly Cheyenne: Heóvėsta'é'e, transl. Yellow-haired Woman (Note: In Cheyenne, "Yellowhead Woman" is Heóvėsta'é'e, while "Yellowhair Woman" is Heóvá'é'e or Heóvá'é'ke) c. 1826 – 1915) was a Cheyenne woman warrior. She was the daughter of a chief, Stands-in-the-Timber, who died in 1849, and the niece of Bad Faced Bull. She fought in the Battle of Beecher Island in 1868, and also fought the Shoshone that same year, where she counted coup against one enemy and killed another. She fought the Shoshone again in 1869, and during battle she stabbed and killed an enemy, saving a member of her own people.

It is said that she rode her father's horse, and sang songs alongside a fellow woman warrior, Buffalo Wallow Woman of the Lakota. She was also a member of a secret society composed exclusively of Cheyenne women. During this period, Cheyenne women often participated in battle, dressed and armed the same as the male warriors were.

She died in August of 1915 at the Tongue River Reservation in Montana, aged eighty-nine.

She is one of the women in the Heritage Floor of the famous feminist installation art work, The Dinner Party, by Judy Chicago.
