= Battle of Beecher Island =

1868 battle in the American Indian Wars

- Part of the Comanche War, American Indian Wars
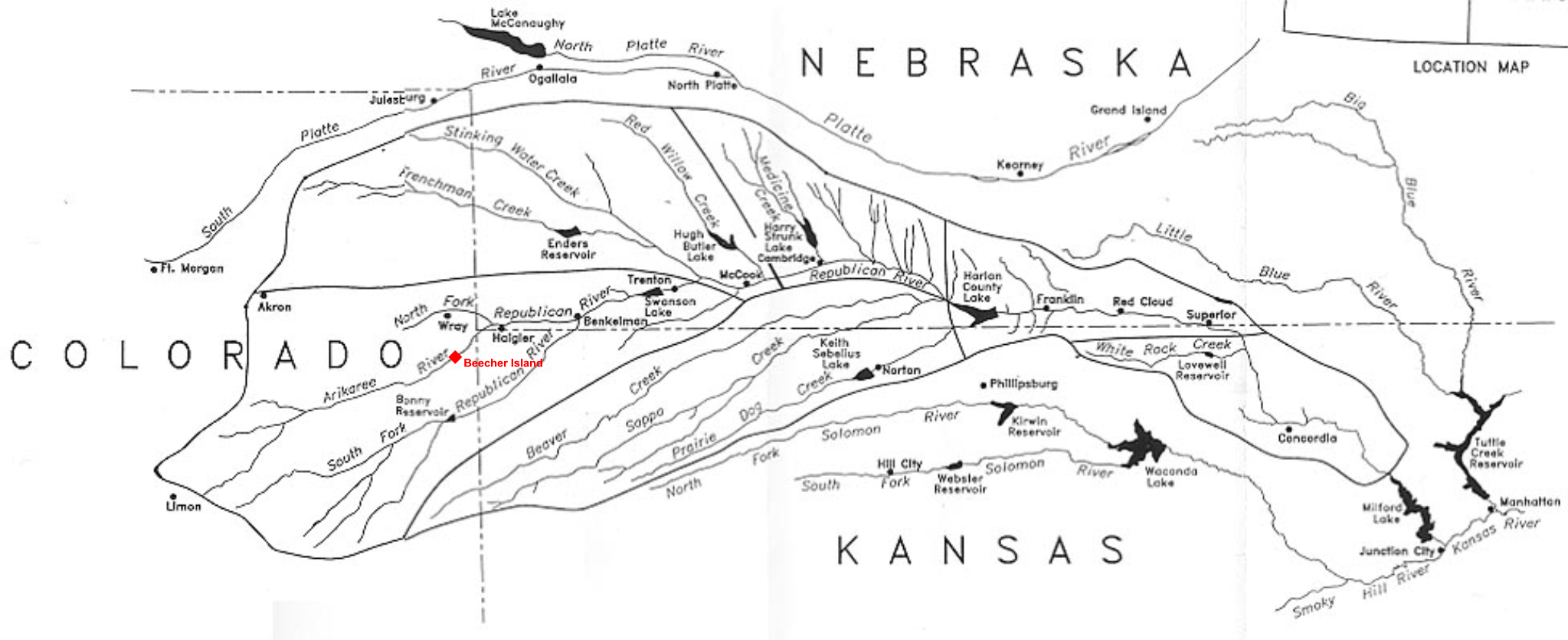
- A map of the Republican River and its tributaries, with the location of Beecher Island highlighted in red.
Date	17–19 September 1868
Location	Yuma County, Colorado 39°52′18″N 102°11′08″W
Result	United States victory

Belligerents
United States	Arapaho; Cheyenne; Sioux

Commanders and leaders
(United States) Brv-Col. G. A. Forsyth (United States) Lt. F. H. Beecher †; J. H. Mooers, Surgeon †	Roman Nose †

Strength
50 civilian scouts	200–1,000 warriors

Casualties and losses
6 killed 15 wounded	9–32 killed
- Location within Colorado

The Battle of Beecher Island, also known as the Battle of Arikaree Fork, was an armed conflict between several of the Plains Native American tribes and Forsyth's Scouts, a company of selected civilian frontiersmen, recruited and commanded by Brevet-Colonel George Alexander Forsyth. The battle occurred in late September 1868 with Forsyth and the scouts making a stand at Beecher Island, on the Arikaree River, then known as part of the North Fork of the Republican River, near present-day Wray, Colorado, named afterwards for Lieutenant Fredrick H. Beecher, Forsyth's executive officer killed during the battle.

== Background ==
In the summer and fall of 1868, continuing their annual seasonal raiding activities between the Arkansas and Platte Rivers in what was also the region of their best buffalo hunting, bands of Cheyenne and Arapaho Indians conducted raids against whites throughout the western Great Plains in Kansas. In addition, they found incentive in the warfare that had been waged specifically against their clans by the military in 1867 and by memories of such atrocities as the Sand Creek massacre. Finally, the westward movement of the transcontinental railroad had stretched all the way across Kansas, bringing with it many permanent white settlements.

During the period 1867–1868, the Cheyenne were in schism, with those advocating peace (possibly a majority) retreating south out of Kansas and the younger, intractable warrior societies continuing to raid. The latter during the summer of 1867 had successfully avoided a large expedition commanded by Maj. Gen. Winfield S. Hancock and in the process had garnered sympathy from Americans in the East who supported peaceful negotiations after Hancock attempted to force the Cheyenne to submit and burned their abandoned villages when they did not.

In August 1868, General Philip Sheridan replaced Hancock in command of the Department of the Missouri and was asked by acting Governor Frank Hall of Colorado for assistance after 79 settlers were killed in repeated attacks on farms, ranches, way stations, and travel routes. Sheridan's main effort was to be made south of the Arkansas during a winter campaign in the Indian Territory, but he remained active in Kansas during the warmer weather, patrolling the Arkansas with the 7th Cavalry and the area between the Republican and Smoky Hill Rivers using the 10th Cavalry.

=== Unit formation ===
As the Indians fought dispersed battles composed of small bands of warriors all over the frontier, U.S. Army troops and units were at a premium. General Sheridan decided to try an unusual tactic. He ordered his aide, Major George Alexander Forsyth of the 9th Cavalry, a Civil War veteran, to raise a company of "fifty first-class hardy frontiersmen, to be used as scouts against the hostile Indians." They were to seek out and engage the marauders using their tactics, rather than those of the traditional Army. As the scouts were civilians, Forsyth's orders authorized him to "enter into such articles of agreement with these men as will compel obedience."

At Fort Harker, Fort Hays, and Fort Wallace, Forsyth recruited over 50 civilian scouts, "selected from the best marksmen and hunters on the plains," and armed them with Spencer repeating rifles. Forsyth's executive officer was Lieutenant Fredrick H. Beecher of the 3rd Infantry, a decorated veteran of the Battle of Gettysburg. Also attached was Acting Assistant Surgeon J. H. Mooers, a civilian contract surgeon with a practice in Hays City.

Forsyth's company rode northwest nearly to Nebraska, then turned southwest and reached Fort Wallace the night of 5 September without finding any trace of Indians.

== The engagement ==
During the morning of 10 September, the troops at Fort Wallace received information that Indians had attacked a freighter's train 13 miles (21 km) east of Ft. Wallace, near the railhead (at that time) of the Kansas Pacific Railroad, which was the since-abandoned town of Sheridan in Logan County, Kansas. Brevet Colonel Forsyth and his group of scouts departed Fort Wallace with orders to counter the raid. Col. Forsyth took his command to investigate. They learned that a force of about 25 Indians had taken part in the attack. They followed their trail into what is now Yuma County, Colorado.

The trail was heavily beaten, indicating that the opposing force considerably outnumbered the scouts, but the unit nonetheless pressed on. Around dusk on the 16th, Forsyth and his men arrived in the vicinity of the "Dry Fork of the Republican River" (reported at the time as "Delaware Creek"—now the Arikaree River) and made camp on the south bank. They camped only 12 miles (19 km) downstream from a large encampment of two Lakota villages, one of Cheyenne Dog Soldiers (led by Roman Nose) and a few lodges of Arapaho. A group of Sioux warriors soon announced the arrival of Forsyth's men.

=== Indian surprise thwarted ===
By the morning of the 17th, hundreds of Indians (variously estimated to number 200, 600, or 1,000) had positioned themselves among the bluffs around Forsyth's camp. A group of eight tried to stampede the soldiers' horses, and Forsyth heard their war cries. Soldiers thwarted them, while the rest mounted their horses. Dozens of Indians galloped towards Forsyth on the riverbed opposite the way he and his men had entered it. These were driven back and Forsyth directed his men to cross the river's shallows to a sandbar, where they tied their horses to bushes to form a barricade.

The initial assault by the Indians was cut down by the accurate, quick-firing Spencer rifles. The combined force of Oglala Sioux and Cheyenne Indians were surprised and changed their tactics.

During the early morning of the first day of battle, small parties of Indians dashed up to the sand bar on horseback several times, but they did little damage to the scouts. The scouts killed their horses for breastworks and dug pits into the soft sand behind them. When the scouts opened fire, the Indians attacked the island on both sides. Later they crawled through the grass and shot through the grass. Several scouts who were killed or wounded were hit by the Indian snipers hidden in the grass. The Indians surrounded the island and repeatedly attacked the scouts. Three scouts hidden in hole on the riverbank shot several Indians from the shore.

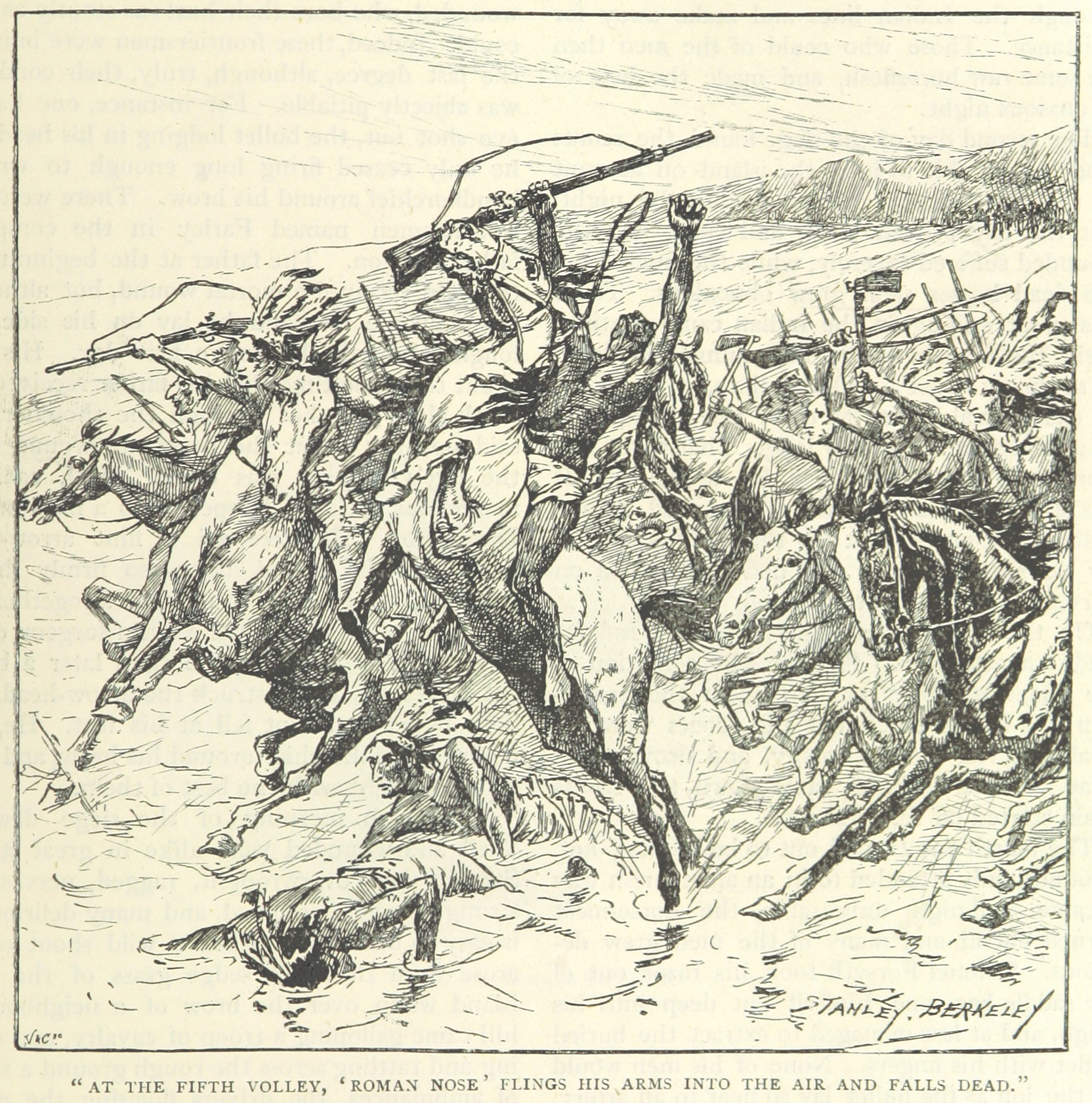
Roman Nose is shot (from an 1895 book)

Roman Nose initially abstained from the battle, believing he would die if he fought that day because he had violated a protective taboo. After another Indian accused him of cowardice, he decided to lead the next attack. When Forsyth saw the charge coming, he ordered his men to hold their fire until the Indians were 50 yards away. After several volleys, Roman Nose was shot in the back on the riverbank at the west end of the sand bar. He jumped back into the grass where other warriors retrieved him. He died at 10 pm that night.

Many other warriors fell, while four of the scouts including Beecher, Acting Surgeon J.H. Mooers, George W. Culver, and William Wilson were killed. Another 15 scouts were wounded, including Colonel Forsyth. Forsyth had received three gunshot wounds: one glancing his head, another shattering his left shin, and a ball was lodged against his right femoral artery.

=== Scouts sent for relief ===
Before dawn on the second day, Forsyth said, "Some one must go to Wallace for assistance." Sharp Grover, who was chief of scouts, said "It is impossible to get out." Then Stilwell came forward and said, "Let me choose the man to go with me and I will go." Grover said, "Jack is too young and inexperienced, he can't get through." Ft. Wallace was about 70 miles (110 km) to the south east. But Forsyth tore off the fly leaf out of his daybook, wrote a note to Col. Bankhead at Ft. Wallace, and gave it to Simpson "Jack" Stilwell.

Stilwell chose Pierre Trudeau to come with him. They crawled for 3 miles (4.8 km) the first day before they took cover in the daylight. They were forced to evade Indians for four days during their journey. They had only horse meat for food and when it spoiled they got sick. Trudeau was so weak he could only stand with assistance, but after resting and traveling for four days they reached Fort Wallace. Two nights after Stilwell and Trudeau left, Scouts John J. Donovan and Allison J. Pliley left the island to seek relief. It was unknown if Scouts Stilwell and Trudeau had made it through the Indian lines. On the fourth day of the battle, Forsyth asked his men to extract the bullet; when they refused, he used his own razor to remove it. Others thought Forsyth would die of his wounds before they would be rescued.

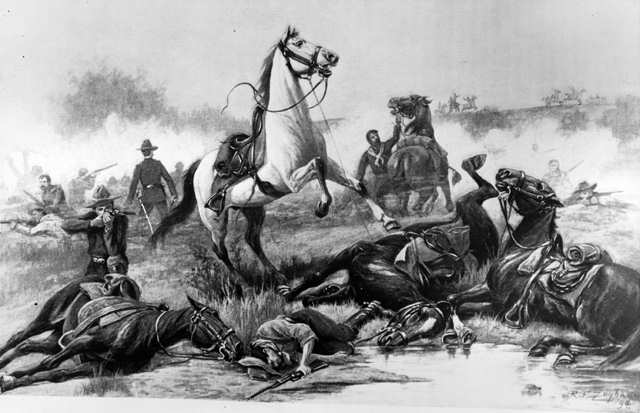
Defending the Island
One soldier and three horses have fallen, while others continue to wage the battle.

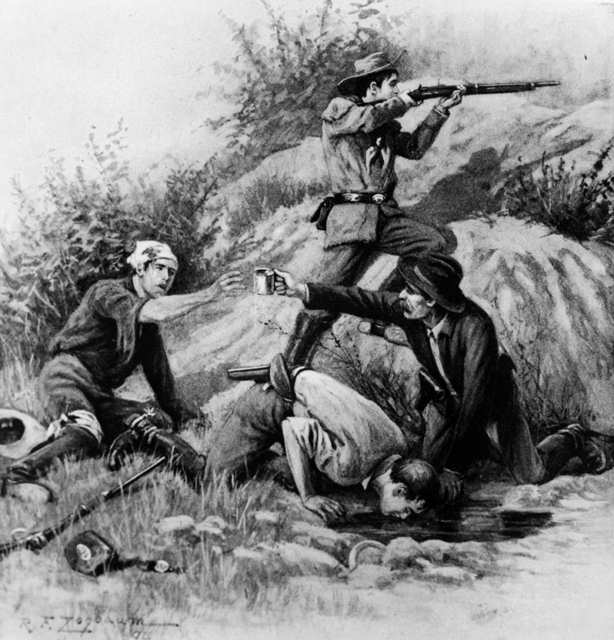
In the pits
An officer hands a wounded soldier water as another man drinks from a pool, while a third prepares to fire his rifle.

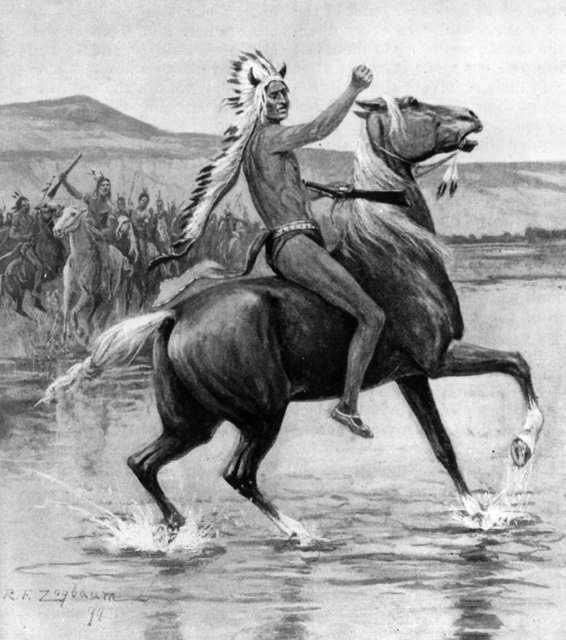
Chief Roman Nose
Roman Nose, on horseback, taunts the U.S. soldiers as a group of spectators on horseback cheer him on.

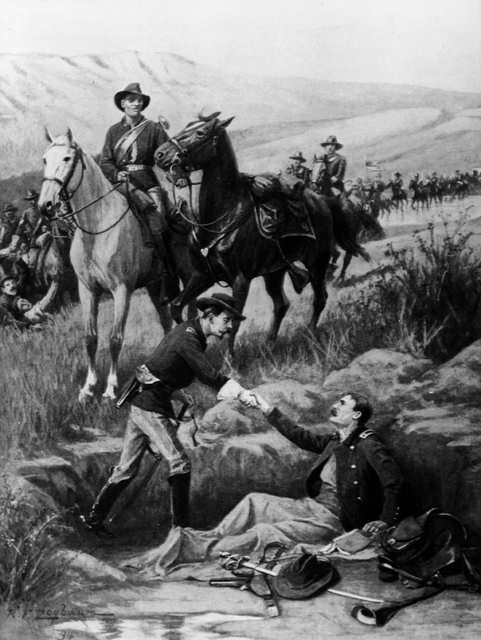
The Rescue
A soldier offers aid to his wounded comrade after the Battle of Beecher Island. The Harper's article states that this is Bvt. Col. Louis H. Carpenter greeting Lt. Col. G. A. Forsyth who was twice wounded. Notice officer shoulder boards.

=== Relieved ===
Three rescue parties departed following different routes due to the uncertainty of the Scout's location. The first was Lieutenant Colonel Louis H. Carpenter leading Troop H & I of the 10th Cavalry Regiment (Buffalo Soldiers) with Captain Baldwin. Major Brisbin in command of two troops of the 2nd Cavalry took another route. Captain Bankhead, went from Fort Wallace with about 100 men of the 5th Infantry, took a third route.

About daybreak on 25 September, Lt.Col. Carpenter's Troops H & I were intercepted on the plains by Scout John Donovan and four riders he had recruited after reaching Fort Wallace and starting back for the battlefield. They were the first to arrive and relieve Forsyth's unit. Carpenter later received the Medal of Honor for his relief of Forsyth's command and for his actions during the battle on Beaver Creek.

Over fifty dead horses greeted them with their putrid smell. Forsyth's command had been out of rations and forced to survive on the decaying horse flesh. The air around Forsyth was completely filled with a great stench and was swarming with black flies feasting on the rotting defensive line of dead horses. The square sandy hole, where Forsyth was lying was half encircled by dead mounts and would have become his grave if help had not arrived when it did. Other gun pits, interconnected, contained the living and the dead of his unit.

Carpenter immediately secured the area and pitched a number of tents up wind nearby. The wounded men were carefully carried there for more healthy air and the dead men were buried to reduce the stench and possibility of disease. Twenty-six hours later, Carpenter sent a detachment to look for Bankhead's unit. They found Stilwell and Trudeau several miles in advance of Bankhead. Captain Bankhead followed bringing with him the two troops of the 2nd Cavalry.

The following day, a fifth scout died of his wounds and was buried on the battlefield with the other four scouts. Walter Armstrong died in a hospital later. Beecher, Culver, Farley, Wilson and Doctor Mooers were buried on the island. Sixteen others were wounded. On 27 September, the Forsyth Scouts departed for Fort Wallace, escorted by the 10th Cavalry.

== Aftermath ==
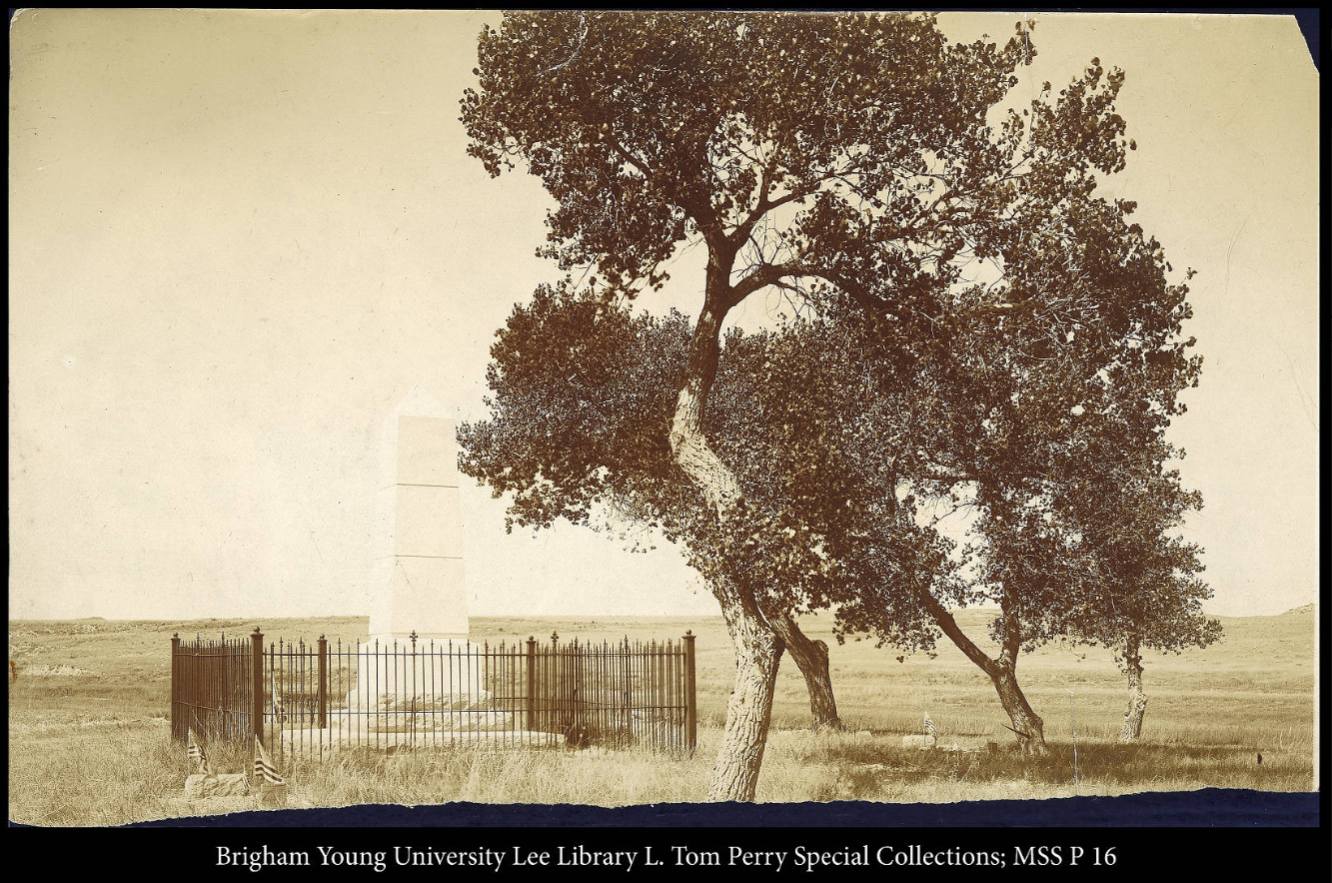
Beecher Island Monument, 1899

The "Forsyth Scouts" arrived back at Fort Wallace on 30 September. General George Custer later proclaimed that the Arickaree fight was "…the greatest battle on the plains." To the Cheyenne, the engagement would be remembered as "The Fight when Roman Nose was Killed." Only nine Indians were confirmed killed, but the U.S. soldiers claimed to have slain hundreds. Years later Forsyth had a chance encounter with a Brule Lakota warrior who was at the battle. Through an interpreter this warrior recounted that the natives had suffered 75 dead and numerous more wounded. The fight's significance as a tactical model for combating the Indians was largely ignored. The location of the battle was listed on the National Register of Historic Places in 1976.

The next spring Captain Brown returned to retrieve the bodies. He found Culver and Farley's remains, but Beecher, Wilson and Doctor Mooers' graves were empty, apparently removed by Indians. Culver and Farley were re-buried at Ft. Wallace.

A monument was erected by the states of Colorado and Kansas at the site of the battle.

== Historic designations ==
- National Register of Historic Places #NPS–76000569 — "Beecher Island Battleground Memorial" site
- Colorado State Register Property

== See also ==
- Ehyophsta
- List of battles fought in Colorado
