= Wauneta, Colorado =

Unincorporated community in Yuma County, CO, USA

- Unincorporated community
- Location within Colorado Location within the United States
- Coordinates: 40°17′35″N 102°15′17″W
- Country: United States
- State: Colorado
- County: Yuma
- Elevation: 3,724 ft (1,135 m)
- Time zone: UTC−7 (MST)
  - Summer (DST): UTC−6 (MDT)
- Area code: 970
- FIPS code: 08-82970
- GNIS ID: 182949

Wauneta is an unincorporated community in Yuma County, Colorado, United States.
