= Idalia, Colorado =

Unincorporated community in Yuma County, CO, USA

- Census-designated place
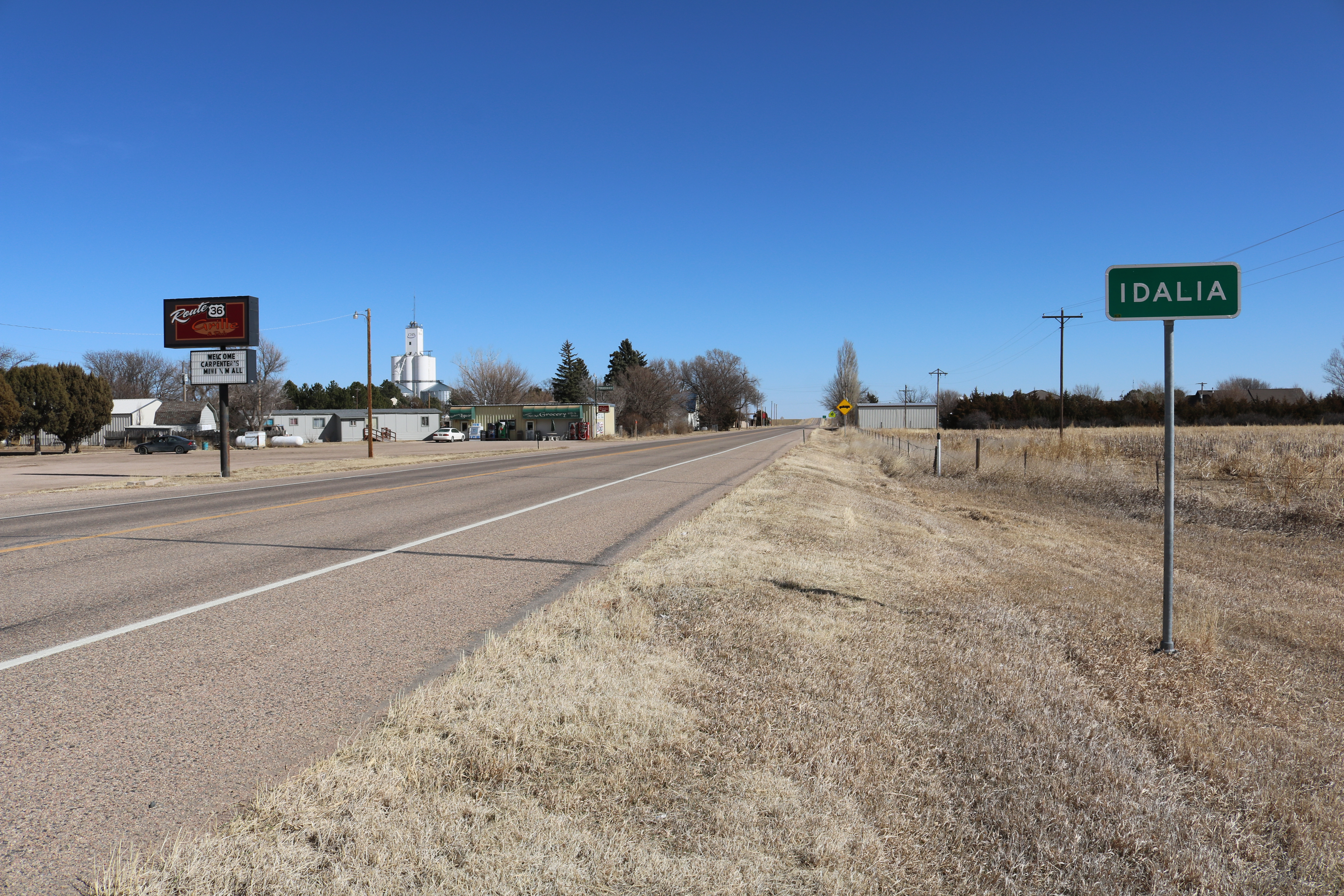
- Looking east on U.S. Route 36 (2017)
- Nickname: Jewel of the Plains
- Location within Yuma County and Colorado
- Coordinates: 39°42′11″N 102°17′38″W
- Country: United States
- State: Colorado
- County: Yuma
- Founded: 1887

Government
  - Type: unincorporated community

Area
  - Total: 0.085 sq mi (0.220 km^{2})
  - Land: 0.085 sq mi (0.220 km^{2})
  - Water: 0 sq mi (0.000 km^{2})
- Elevation: 3,967 ft (1,209 m)

Population (2020)
  - Total: 97
  - Density: 1,100/sq mi (440/km^{2})
- Time zone: UTC−7 (MST)
  - Summer (DST): UTC−6 (MDT)
- ZIP Code: 80735
- Area code: 970
- FIPS code: 08-38425
- GNIS ID: 2583249

Idalia is an unincorporated town and census-designated place (CDP) in Yuma County, Colorado, United States. At the United States Census 2020, the population of the Idalia CDP was 97. The Idalia post office has the ZIP Code 80735.

== History ==
Idalia was originally founded in 1887 as Alva. The Alva, Colorado, post office operated from August 6, 1887, until September 18, 1888, when the name was changed to Idalia. The community derives its name from Edaliah Helmick, a pioneer settler.

Located on the Eastern Plains of Colorado in southern Yuma County, approximately 150 miles east of Denver and 15 miles from the Kansas border, Idalia has been home for many generations of families. The primary industries of the area are farming, ranching, and natural gas production. The community has many amenities for a small rural community, including the Idalia Vision Foundation, Inc., two churches, local Co-Op, convenience store, restaurants, and a motel. A new Kindergarten through grade-12 school building opened in the fall of 2013 providing state-of-the-art educational programs & facilities.

== Geography ==
Idalia is located along U.S. highway route 36 approximately two miles west of U.S. highway route 385.

The Idalia CDP has an area of 54 acres (0.220 km^{2}), all land.

=== Climate ===
Climate data for Idalia, Colorado (1991–2020 normals, extremes 1941–1946, 1987–2021)
Month	Jan	Feb	Mar	Apr	May	Jun	Jul	Aug	Sep	Oct	Nov	Dec	Year
Record high °F (°C)	75 (24)	81 (27)	84 (29)	92 (33)	99 (37)	110 (43)	107 (42)	104 (40)	101 (38)	93 (34)	83 (28)	78 (26)	110 (43)
Mean daily maximum °F (°C)	42.1 (5.6)	44.1 (6.7)	54.7 (12.6)	62.2 (16.8)	71.6 (22.0)	83.9 (28.8)	89.6 (32.0)	86.9 (30.5)	79.0 (26.1)	65.4 (18.6)	52.3 (11.3)	42.7 (5.9)	64.5 (18.1)
Daily mean °F (°C)	29.1 (−1.6)	31.1 (−0.5)	40.3 (4.6)	47.7 (8.7)	57.7 (14.3)	69.1 (20.6)	75.1 (23.9)	72.6 (22.6)	64.2 (17.9)	50.7 (10.4)	38.6 (3.7)	29.8 (−1.2)	50.5 (10.3)
Mean daily minimum °F (°C)	16.2 (−8.8)	18.1 (−7.7)	26.0 (−3.3)	33.3 (0.7)	43.9 (6.6)	54.4 (12.4)	60.6 (15.9)	58.2 (14.6)	49.4 (9.7)	36.0 (2.2)	24.9 (−3.9)	16.9 (−8.4)	36.5 (2.5)
Record low °F (°C)	−27 (−33)	−24 (−31)	−11 (−24)	6 (−14)	24 (−4)	33 (1)	36 (2)	40 (4)	26 (−3)	0 (−18)	−7 (−22)	−26 (−32)	−27 (−33)
Average precipitation inches (mm)	0.47 (12)	0.46 (12)	1.03 (26)	1.83 (46)	2.82 (72)	2.84 (72)	2.96 (75)	3.19 (81)	1.20 (30)	1.38 (35)	0.53 (13)	0.43 (11)	19.14 (486)
Average snowfall inches (cm)	4.4 (11)	5.0 (13)	5.1 (13)	3.4 (8.6)	0.2 (0.51)	0.0 (0.0)	0.0 (0.0)	0.0 (0.0)	0.5 (1.3)	3.2 (8.1)	2.9 (7.4)	3.8 (9.7)	28.5 (72)
Average precipitation days (≥ 0.01 in)	2.4	3.0	3.8	5.9	8.1	7.8	7.0	6.3	3.9	4.3	2.9	2.7	58.1
Average snowy days (≥ 0.1 in)	2.0	2.5	2.0	1.3	0.2	0.0	0.0	0.0	0.1	0.6	1.7	2.3	12.7
Source: NOAA

== Demographics ==
The United States Census Bureau initially defined the Idalia CDP for the United States Census 2010.

Historical population
Census	Pop.	Note	%±
2010	88		—
2020	97		10.2%
U.S. Decennial Census

== Events ==
=== Idalia Days Celebration ===
Community members headed a project aimed at emulating the summer annual town celebrations of neighboring towns. The event, Idalia Days, takes place each summer if enough interest is provided. During its inaugural celebration, Idalia Days provided activities and events in which the community could partake. Drawing on themes used in previous town celebrations, events include bed races, an old-time baseball game, old man six-man football, a melodrama illustrating the history of the towns relocation, a softball tournament, and a town dance, often featuring live music and food.

== Education ==
There is one school, Idalia School, which teaches preschool through twelfth grade. The school mascot is the wolf. The town also has a preschool and daycare.

Timeline

- (1950) First students graduate from the Idalia school.
- (1970's) A high school wing was added to the preexisting school.
- (1995) A new gymnasium is built.
- (2012-2013) The old school is torn down and a new school is built after the State of Colorado awards Idalia the BEST grant.

=== Sports ===
Due to low enrollment of the high school, Idalia, like hundreds of schools throughout Kansas, Nebraska, Wyoming, Utah, and Texas, plays six-man football, a variation of football involving six players on each side off the ball rather than the traditional eleven. Idalia had a dominant program from the late 1990s into the 2000s, winning eight state titles between 1998 and 2010. In recent years, the football program has struggled in the face of low-enrollment and as rival schools have consolidated sports programs in the wake of their own enrollment and budgetary constraints.

However, as the football program continues to rebuild, the Idalia girls' sports teams have had some very successful years. In 2015, the Idalia girls' volleyball team advanced to the Colorado Class 1A volleyball championship match, ultimately falling to Otis High School in five sets. In addition, the girls' basketball program won consecutive state championships in 2015 and 2016.

== See also ==
- Outline of Colorado
