= Yuma County, Colorado =

County in Colorado, United States

- County
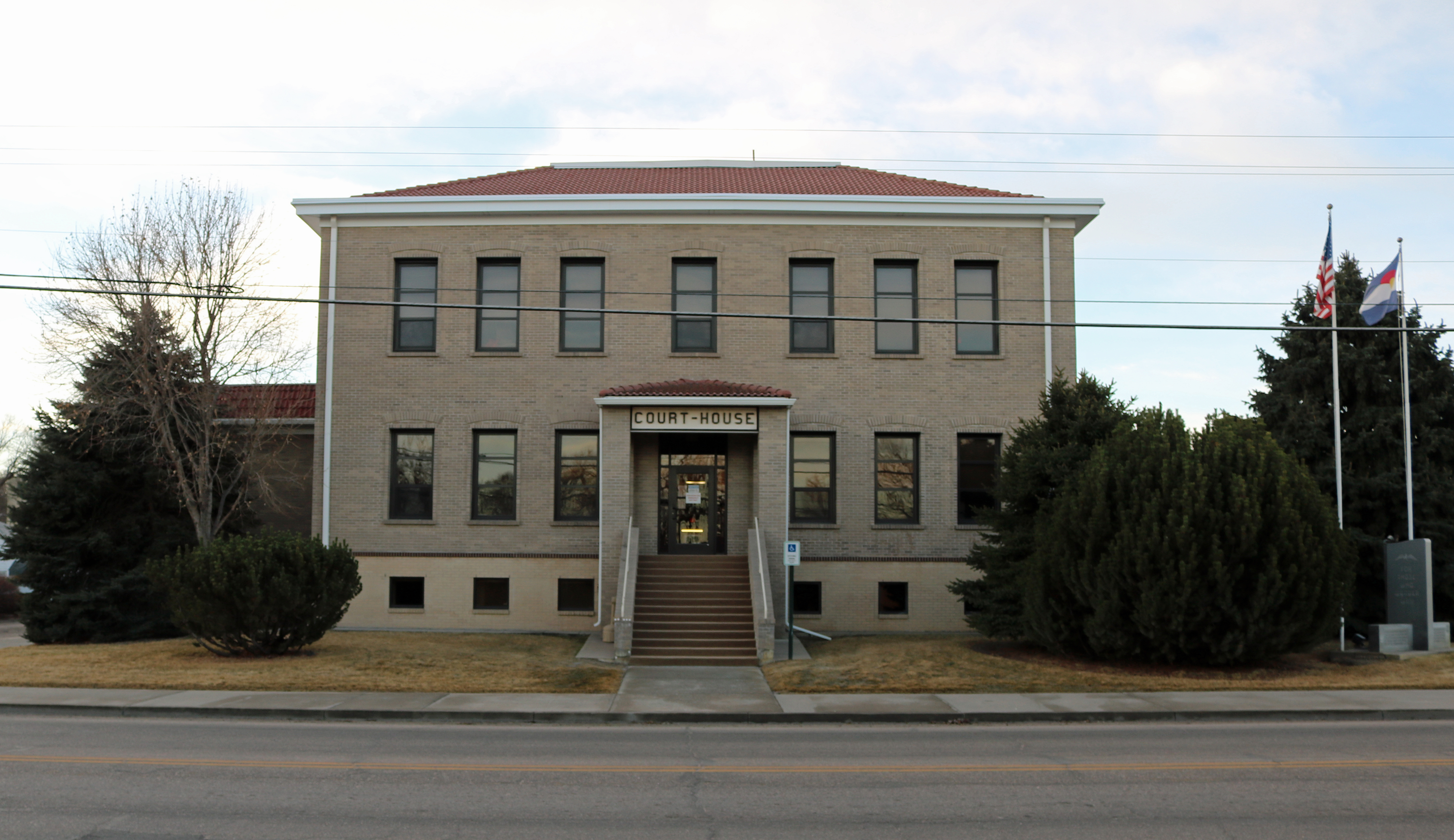
- The Yuma County Court-House in Wray.

- Location within the U.S. state of Colorado
- Coordinates: 40.00°N 102.42°W
- Country: United States
- State: Colorado
- Founded: March 15, 1889
- Seat: Wray
- Largest city: Yuma

Area
  - Total: 2,369 sq mi (6,140 km^{2})
  - Land: 2,364 sq mi (6,120 km^{2})
  - Water: 4.3 sq mi (11 km^{2}) 0.2%

Population (2020)
  - Total: 9,988
  - Estimate (2025): 9,896 ▼
  - Density: 4.225/sq mi (1.631/km^{2})
- Time zone: UTC−7 (Mountain)
  - Summer (DST): UTC−6 (MDT)
- Congressional district: 4th
- Website: www.yumacounty.net

Yuma County is a county located in the U.S. state of Colorado. As of the 2020 census, the population was 9,988. The county seat is Wray.

== Geography ==
According to the U.S. Census Bureau, the county has a total area of 2,369 square miles (6,140 km^{2}), of which 2,364 square miles (6,120 km^{2}) is land and 4.3 square miles (11 km^{2}) (0.2%) is water.

The point where the Arikaree River flows out of Yuma County and into Cheyenne County, Kansas is the lowest point in the State of Colorado at 1,010 meters (3,310 feet) elevation. This crossing point is the highest low point of any U.S. state.

=== Adjacent counties ===
- Phillips County (north)
- Chase County, Nebraska (northeast)
- Cheyenne County, Kansas (east/Central Time border)
- Dundy County, Nebraska (east)
- Kit Carson County (south)
- Washington County (west)
- Logan County (northwest)

=== Major highways ===
- U.S. Highway 34
- U.S. Highway 36
- U.S. Highway 385
- State Highway 59

== Demographics ==
Historical population
Census	Pop.	Note	%±
1890	2,596		—
1900	1,729		−33.4%
1910	8,499		391.6%
1920	13,897		63.5%
1930	13,613		−2.0%
1940	12,102		−11.1%
1950	10,827		−10.5%
1960	8,912		−17.7%
1970	8,544		−4.1%
1980	9,682		13.3%
1990	8,954		−7.5%
2000	9,841		9.9%
2010	10,043		2.1%
2020	9,988		−0.5%
2025 (est.)	9,896	▼	−0.9%
U.S. Decennial Census; 1790-1960 1900-1990; 1990-2000 2010-2020

=== 2020 census ===
As of the 2020 census, the county had a population of 9,988. Of the residents, 26.7% were under the age of 18 and 18.3% were 65 years of age or older; the median age was 38.0 years. For every 100 females there were 101.5 males, and for every 100 females age 18 and over there were 102.1 males. 0.0% of residents lived in urban areas and 100.0% lived in rural areas.

Yuma County, Colorado – Racial and ethnic composition Note: the US Census treats Hispanic/Latino as an ethnic category. This table excludes Latinos from the racial categories and assigns them to a separate category. Hispanics/Latinos may be of any race.
Race / Ethnicity (NH = Non-Hispanic)	Pop 2000	Pop 2010	Pop 2020	% 2000	% 2010	% 2020
White alone (NH)	8,474	7,824	6,948	86.11%	77.90%	69.56%
Black or African American alone (NH)	10	16	21	0.10%	0.16%	0.21%
Native American or Alaska Native alone (NH)	21	33	16	0.21%	0.33%	0.16%
Asian alone (NH)	7	20	26	0.07%	0.20%	0.26%
Pacific Islander alone (NH)	2	3	2	0.02%	0.03%	0.02%
Other race alone (NH)	0	9	27	0.00%	0.09%	0.27%
Mixed race or Multiracial (NH)	59	50	177	0.60%	0.50%	1.77%
Hispanic or Latino (any race)	1,268	2,088	2,771	12.88%	20.79%	27.74%
Total	9,841	10,043	9,988	100.00%	100.00%	100.00%

The racial makeup of the county was 74.5% White, 0.2% Black or African American, 0.7% American Indian and Alaska Native, 0.3% Asian, 0.1% Native Hawaiian and Pacific Islander, 13.7% from some other race, and 10.5% from two or more races. Hispanic or Latino residents of any race comprised 27.7% of the population.

There were 3,852 households in the county, of which 33.9% had children under the age of 18 living with them and 21.8% had a female householder with no spouse or partner present. About 27.7% of all households were made up of individuals and 13.8% had someone living alone who was 65 years of age or older.

There were 4,315 housing units, of which 10.7% were vacant. Among occupied housing units, 69.1% were owner-occupied and 30.9% were renter-occupied. The homeowner vacancy rate was 1.4% and the rental vacancy rate was 8.7%.

=== 2000 census ===
At the 2000 census there were 9,841 people, 3,800 households, and 2,644 families living in the county. The population density was 4 people per square mile (1.5 people/km^{2}). There were 4,295 housing units at an average density of 2 units per square mile (0.77 units/km^{2}). The racial makeup of the county was 94.17% White, 0.11% Black or African American, 0.28% Native American, 0.07% Asian, 0.02% Pacific Islander, 4.14% from other races, and 1.21% from two or more races. 12.88% of the population were Hispanic or Latino of any race. Of the 3,800 households 33.30% had children under the age of 18 living with them, 59.60% were married couples living together, 6.80% had a female householder with no husband present, and 30.40% were non-families. 27.40% of households were one person and 13.30% were one person aged 65 or older. The average household size was 2.55 and the average family size was 3.13.

The age distribution was 28.30% under the age of 18, 7.10% from 18 to 24, 26.00% from 25 to 44, 22.30% from 45 to 64, and 16.30% 65 or older. The median age was 37 years. For every 100 females there were 96.80 males. For every 100 females age 18 and over, there were 94.90 males.

The median household income was $33,169 and the median family income was $39,814. Males had a median income of $26,124 versus $18,578 for females. The per capita income for the county was $16,005. About 8.80% of families and 12.90% of the population were below the poverty line, including 15.50% of those under age 18 and 10.70% of those age 65 or over.

== Politics ==
As all on the High Plains, Yuma County is a Republican Party stronghold in presidential elections. Only nine presidential elections from 1892 to the present day have seen the county fail to back the Republican candidate, the most recent being 1964 during Lyndon B. Johnson's statewide & national landslide.

United States presidential election results for Yuma County, Colorado
Year	Republican		Democratic		Third party(ies)	
Year	No.	%	No.	%	No.	%
1892	198	35.29%	0	0.00%	363	64.71%
1896	180	28.44%	442	69.83%	11	1.74%
1900	316	42.25%	392	52.41%	40	5.35%
1904	1,110	63.50%	525	30.03%	113	6.46%
1908	1,061	44.67%	1,148	48.34%	166	6.99%
1912	466	14.42%	1,170	36.20%	1,596	49.38%
1916	1,436	34.51%	2,466	59.26%	259	6.22%
1920	2,673	63.42%	1,254	29.75%	288	6.83%
1924	2,789	57.91%	865	17.96%	1,162	24.13%
1928	3,401	69.07%	1,383	28.09%	140	2.84%
1932	2,129	37.34%	3,220	56.48%	352	6.17%
1936	2,462	45.26%	2,878	52.90%	100	1.84%
1940	3,531	64.11%	1,917	34.80%	60	1.09%
1944	2,847	67.45%	1,374	32.55%	0	0.00%
1948	2,277	54.05%	1,907	45.26%	29	0.69%
1952	3,404	71.92%	1,292	27.30%	37	0.78%
1956	2,782	64.26%	1,544	35.67%	3	0.07%
1960	2,806	65.18%	1,489	34.59%	10	0.23%
1964	2,007	48.12%	2,145	51.43%	19	0.46%
1968	2,529	62.68%	1,175	29.12%	331	8.20%
1972	2,873	71.03%	1,066	26.35%	106	2.62%
1976	2,350	52.20%	2,025	44.98%	127	2.82%
1980	3,220	68.89%	1,043	22.31%	411	8.79%
1984	3,394	74.32%	1,121	24.55%	52	1.14%
1988	2,513	56.93%	1,835	41.57%	66	1.50%
1992	2,019	44.82%	1,269	28.17%	1,217	27.01%
1996	2,589	58.72%	1,439	32.64%	381	8.64%
2000	3,156	72.42%	1,082	24.83%	120	2.75%
2004	3,456	75.81%	1,064	23.34%	39	0.86%
2008	3,286	73.30%	1,117	24.92%	80	1.78%
2012	3,490	76.25%	987	21.56%	100	2.18%
2016	3,850	80.36%	726	15.15%	215	4.49%
2020	4,107	82.45%	785	15.76%	89	1.79%
2024	3,807	81.64%	758	16.26%	98	2.10%

United States Senate election results for Yuma County, Colorado2
Year	Republican		Democratic		Third party(ies)	
Year	No.	%	No.	%	No.	%
2020	4,273	85.85%	652	13.10%	52	1.04%

United States Senate election results for Yuma County, Colorado3
Year	Republican		Democratic		Third party(ies)	
Year	No.	%	No.	%	No.	%
2022	3,086	77.79%	740	18.65%	141	3.55%

Colorado Gubernatorial election results for Yuma County
Year	Republican		Democratic		Third party(ies)	
Year	No.	%	No.	%	No.	%
2022	3,079	77.67%	656	16.55%	229	5.78%

== Communities ==
=== Cities ===
- Wray
- Yuma

=== Town ===
- Eckley

=== Census-designated places ===
- Idalia
- Joes
- Kirk
- Laird
- Vernon

=== Unincorporated communities ===
- Abarr
- Alvin
- Clarkville
- Hale
- Wauneta

=== Ghost towns ===
- Arlene
- Armel
- Arnold
- Avoca
- Beecher
- Bolton
- Bryant
- Condon
- Ford
- Fox
- Friend
- Gurney
- Happyville
- Heartstrong
- Hermes
- Hughes
- Ladlum
- Lansing
- Leslie
- Logan
- Mildred
- Newton
- Robb
- Rogers
- Schramm
- Shields
- Steffens
- Wages
- Waverly
- Weld City
- Witherbee

== See also ==
- Bibliography of Colorado
- Geography of Colorado
- History of Colorado
  - National Register of Historic Places listings in Yuma County, Colorado
- Index of Colorado-related articles
- List of Colorado-related lists
  - List of counties in Colorado
- Outline of Colorado
