= Wray, Colorado =

City in Colorado, United States

- Home rule municipality
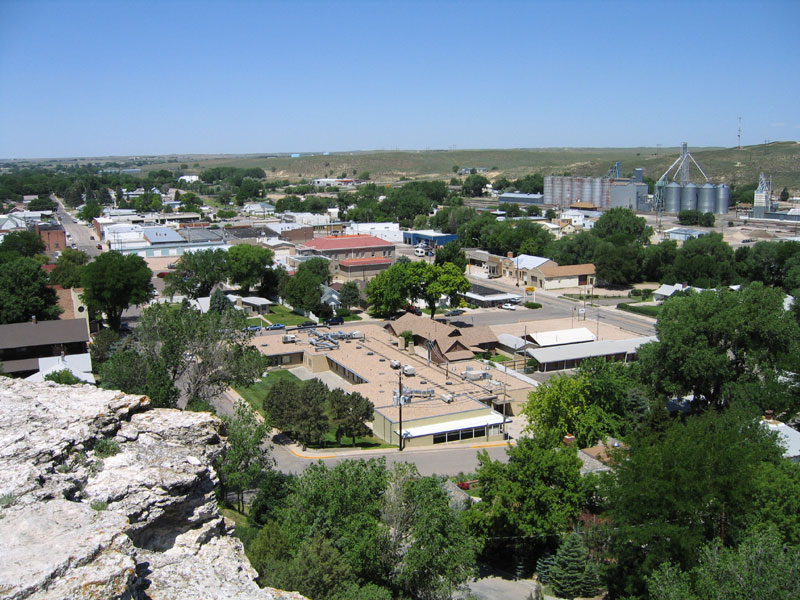
- Wray (2004)

- Flag Logo

- Location within Yuma County and Colorado
- Coordinates: 40°4′32.96″N 102°13′23.7″W
- Country: United States
- State: Colorado
- County: Yuma
- Incorporated: June 22, 1906
- Named for: John Wray

Area
  - Total: 3.51 sq mi (9.10 km^{2})
  - Land: 3.51 sq mi (9.10 km^{2})
  - Water: 0.0039 sq mi (0.01 km^{2})
- Elevation: 3,563 ft (1,086 m)

Population (2020)
  - Total: 2,358
  - Density: 671/sq mi (259/km^{2})
- Time zone: UTC−7 (MST)
  - Summer (DST): UTC−6 (MDT)
- ZIP Code: 80758
- Area code: 970
- FIPS code: 08-86310
- GNIS ID: 183032
- Website: cityofwray.org

Wray (/ˈreɪ/) is the home rule municipality that is the county seat of Yuma County, Colorado, United States. The population was 2,358 at the 2020 United States census. It is located 9 miles west of the Nebraska state line in the northeast Colorado Plains.

== History ==
A post office called Wray has been in operation since 1882. The community was named after John Wray, a cattleman.

Wray was named an "All-America City" in 1993 by the National Civic League.

== Geography ==
Wray is located at 40°4′36″N 102°13′33″W (40.076721, -102.225873), near the intersection of U.S. Highway 34 and U.S. Highway 385. According to the United States Census Bureau, the city has a total area of 3.0 square miles (7.8 km^{2}), all land.

=== Climate ===
Wray has a semi-arid continental climate.

Climate data for Wray, Colorado (1991–2020 normals, extremes 1893–present)
Month	Jan	Feb	Mar	Apr	May	Jun	Jul	Aug	Sep	Oct	Nov	Dec	Year
Record high °F (°C)	80 (27)	80 (27)	88 (31)	94 (34)	103 (39)	110 (43)	112 (44)	110 (43)	105 (41)	96 (36)	90 (32)	78 (26)	112 (44)
Mean daily maximum °F (°C)	43.2 (6.2)	45.8 (7.7)	56.3 (13.5)	64.0 (17.8)	73.2 (22.9)	84.9 (29.4)	90.7 (32.6)	88.2 (31.2)	80.7 (27.1)	67.2 (19.6)	54.0 (12.2)	43.8 (6.6)	66.0 (18.9)
Daily mean °F (°C)	29.3 (−1.5)	31.8 (−0.1)	41.0 (5.0)	48.7 (9.3)	59.0 (15.0)	70.2 (21.2)	75.9 (24.4)	73.4 (23.0)	64.8 (18.2)	51.2 (10.7)	39.1 (3.9)	30.0 (−1.1)	51.2 (10.7)
Mean daily minimum °F (°C)	15.5 (−9.2)	17.7 (−7.9)	25.7 (−3.5)	33.4 (0.8)	44.8 (7.1)	55.5 (13.1)	61.1 (16.2)	58.7 (14.8)	48.8 (9.3)	35.1 (1.7)	24.2 (−4.3)	16.1 (−8.8)	36.4 (2.4)
Record low °F (°C)	−28 (−33)	−32 (−36)	−24 (−31)	−5 (−21)	10 (−12)	25 (−4)	39 (4)	34 (1)	18 (−8)	0 (−18)	−15 (−26)	−33 (−36)	−33 (−36)
Average precipitation inches (mm)	0.43 (11)	0.59 (15)	0.80 (20)	1.88 (48)	2.88 (73)	2.33 (59)	3.43 (87)	2.47 (63)	1.22 (31)	1.37 (35)	0.59 (15)	0.40 (10)	18.39 (467)
Average snowfall inches (cm)	5.0 (13)	6.2 (16)	4.4 (11)	2.4 (6.1)	0.3 (0.76)	0.0 (0.0)	0.0 (0.0)	0.0 (0.0)	0.2 (0.51)	1.9 (4.8)	3.3 (8.4)	4.4 (11)	28.1 (71)
Average precipitation days (≥ 0.01 in)	2.9	3.7	4.4	7.0	10.2	8.7	9.6	7.9	5.5	5.2	3.5	3.5	72.1
Average snowy days (≥ 0.1 in)	2.4	3.1	2.5	1.3	0.1	0.0	0.0	0.0	0.1	0.8	1.8	2.7	14.8
Source: NOAA

== Demographics ==
Historical population
Census	Pop.	Note	%±
1890	125		—
1900	271		116.8%
1910	1,000		269.0%
1920	1,538		53.8%
1930	1,785		16.1%
1940	2,061		15.5%
1950	2,198		6.6%
1960	2,082		−5.3%
1970	1,953		−6.2%
1980	2,131		9.1%
1990	1,998		−6.2%
2000	2,187		9.5%
2010	2,342		7.1%
2020	2,358		0.7%

== Education ==
The school mascot is the Eagles for high school and Eaglets in the lower grades. School colors are purple and white. The Eaglets' colors were originally blue and white but were changed to purple and white in 2011 to match the high school. The school was recently renovated and now encompasses K-12 at the same location.

Morgan Community College operates a center in Wray.

== Healthcare ==
The town and surrounding area are served by the Wray Community District Hospital. The Hospital is one of the few on the Eastern Plains that offer obstetric care.

== Notable people ==
- Harold Tabor (1897-1977) - politician

== See also ==
- Colorado
  - Bibliography of Colorado
  - Index of Colorado-related articles
  - Outline of Colorado
  - Colorado cities and towns
    - Colorado municipalities
  - Colorado counties
    - Yuma County, Colorado
