= Fort Wicked =

Fort Wicked, also known as Godfrey Ranch
- Civilian fort
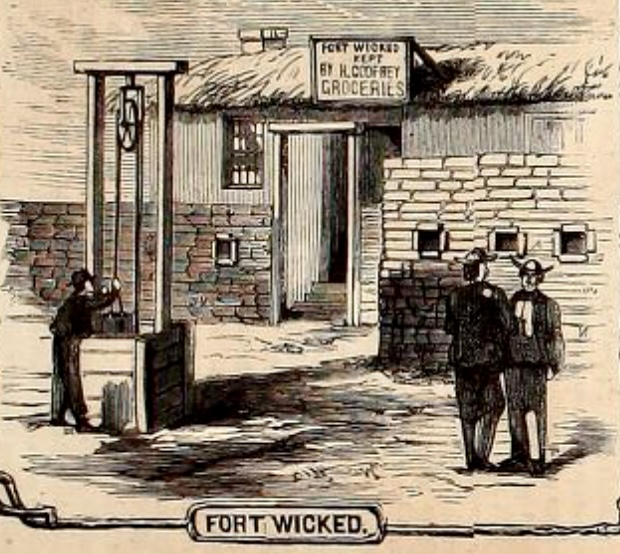
- "Fort Wicked" by James F. Gookins (Harper's Weekly, October 13, 1866)

- Location of the historical marker, near the site of the fort
- Country: United States
- State: Colorado
- County: Logan
- Town: Merino

Fort Wicked was a ranch and stage station on the Overland Trail (South Platte Trail) from 1864 to 1868 in present-day Merino, Colorado. A historical marker commemorating the ranch is located at US 6 and CR-2.5. The ranch itself was located near a ford of the South Platte River, near where US-6 now crosses over the river. Fort Wicked was one of the few places along the trail to Denver that withstood an attack by Lakota (Souix), Cheyenne, and Arapaho Native Americans (Indians) in the Colorado War of 1864. It was named Fort Wicked for the "bitter defence" made by Holon Godfrey, his family, and his employees.

== Godfrey Ranch and establishment of a fort ==
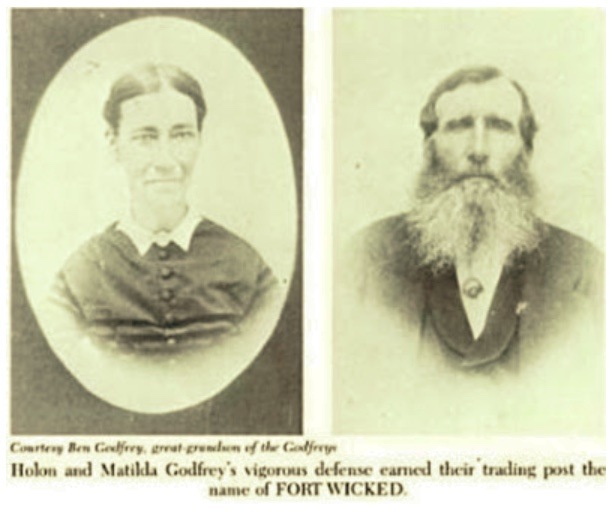
Matilda and Holon Godfrey, who died 1879 and 1899, respectively.

After having followed the gold rush to California and then returned to his family in Wisconsin, Holon Godfrey moved to Colorado with the Pike's Peak Gold Rush (1859) and then settled in the Merino area about 1863, where he established a farm and built a sod house and stable. Most of his family of seven children followed him to Colorado.

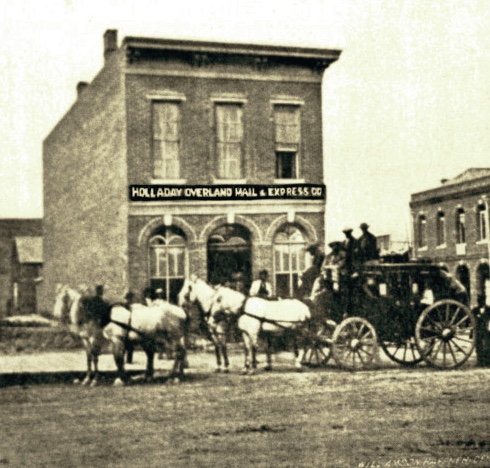
The Holladay Overland Mail & Express Co. stagecoach office was on the southwest corner of fifteenth and Market Streets in Denver. Circa 1860s.

After the Overland Stage Route was established along the South Platte Trail in 1862, Holon Godfrey and his wife Matilda operated a stage station, rest stop, and general store along the route near Merino. Godfrey was also a blacksmith and he bought road-weary horses from pioneers and after giving them a rest and reconditioning them, sold the now healthy horses to other travelers. The ranch sold "needle-gun whiskey" and occasionally provided lodging. In 1864, there was increased likelihood of attacks by Native Americans in the area and he made a fortress out of his ranch with gun ports put in between adobe bricks, a lookout tower on top of the house, and a six-foot high wall surrounding the property.

== Retribution for Sand Creek Massacre ==
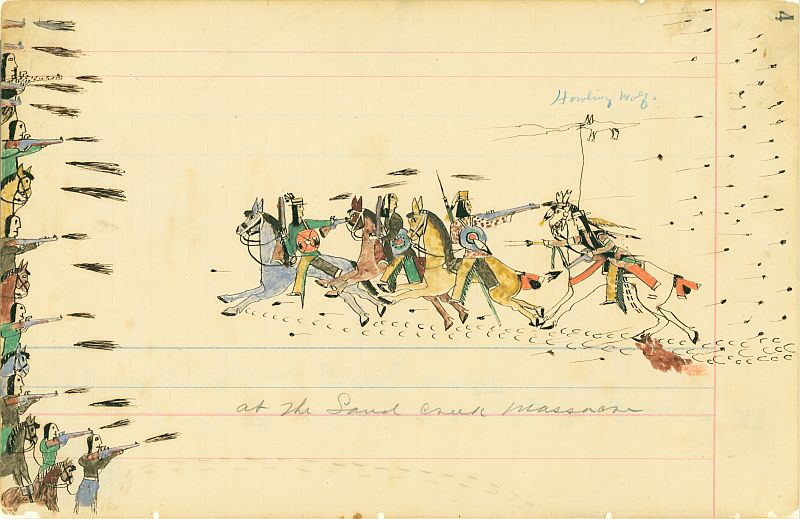
Depiction of the Sand Creek massacre by Cheyenne eyewitness and artist Howling Wolf

Julesburg was attacked on January 7, 1865, by about 1,000 Cheyenne and Sioux men in retribution for the Sand Creek massacre. At Fort Sedgwick, the Native Americans (Indians) killed ten soldiers and four civilians and gathered so much looted food from the settlement of Julesburg that it took three days to remove it to their village at Cherry Creek Three groups of Native Americans, the Arapaho, Cheyenne, and Sioux then attacked stage stations and ranches along the South Platte Trail over six days. In the Colorado War the Indians killed more people, counting both soldiers and civilians, than were killed at the Sand Creek Massacre with few losses of their own. They burned ranches and tore down telegraph lines. They also looted horses, 2000 cattle, and wagon trains, one of which had 22 wagons.

== Raid ==
Holon Godfrey and his family held off an attack by Native Americans, called the Raid on Godfrey Ranch, on January 15, 1865. The story told by Godfrey was that the ranch was attacked by a band of 130 Lakota and Cheyenne warriors. Godfrey, his family, and his ranch hands, fortified their ranch for the attack. The Indian warriors attacked the ranch from which they were met by gunfire from the cowboys stationed inside. They also set the grass surrounding the house on fire, which Godfrey put out with pails of water. The battle lasted from night till morning, with the Indians using various tactics such as trying to burn the house with flaming arrows to kill the men inside, all of which failed. A ranch hand, Mr. Perkins, risked his life by leaving the fort to ride to Fort Morgan to get soldiers or send a telegraph to Denver requesting help. By morning the tribesmen finally left and, according to Godfrey, the bodies of 3 to 17 of their dead laid outside. Godfrey's ranch, which was then christened as Fort Wicked, was one of the few ranches to survive the January 1865 attacks. The cavalry arrived after the Native Americans had left. The nearby American Ranch was also attacked.

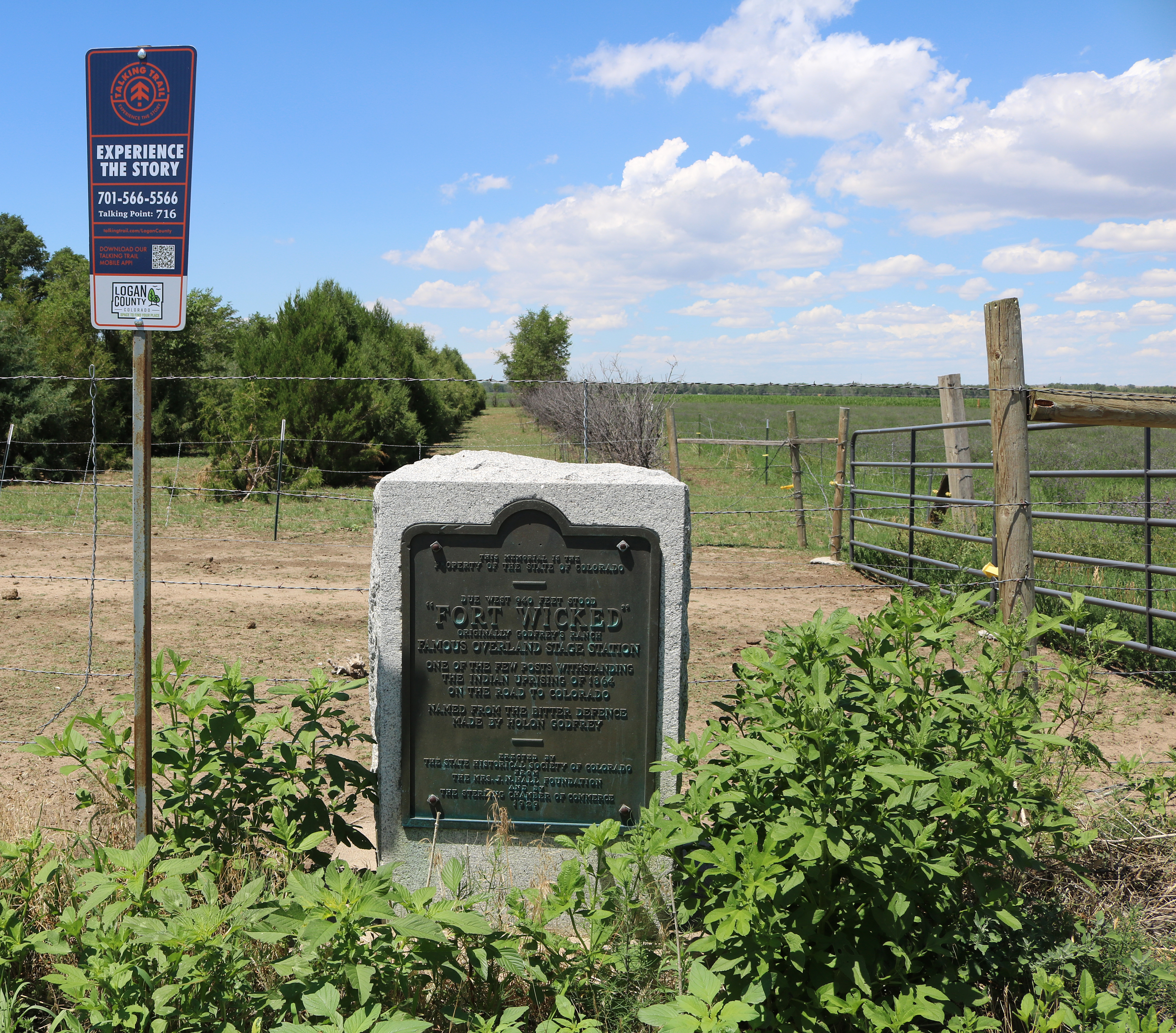
The Fort Wicked historical marker

George Bent, a Cheyenne warrior and a participant in the war, recounted many events during the raids along the South Platte. He describes attacks on ranches, but not specifically the Godfrey Ranch, and he discounts many exaggerated claims of casualties among the Indians, saying that "about the only Indians I can remember being killed in these raids and small fights with the troops" were "three Sioux" killed in an attack on a wagon train.

== Aftermath ==
After the raid, Godfrey painted a sign with the ranch's new name, "Fort Wicked", on the gate of his fort. There was another raid in 1867. The Godfreys left their ranch about 1868, when the Union Pacific Railroad reached Cheyenne, Wyoming. In 1869 or 1870, the Godfreys moved to Platte River district of LaSalle, Colorado, south of Greeley, and raised stock and farmed. He and his wife are considered pioneers there, with the Godfrey ditch and Godfrey Bottoms named for him. Nothing remains of the former ranch and stage station, but a historical marker was placed at the site, which is about three miles southwest of Merino.
