= Raid on Godfrey Ranch =

- Part of the Colorado War
Date	January 15, 1865
Location	Colorado Territory 40°26′36.6″N 103°22′45.2″W
Result	United States victory

Belligerents
United States	Lakota; Cheyenne

Commanders and leaders
Holon Godfrey	Unknown

Strength
3 men	130 warriors

Casualties and losses
None	0–17 killed

The Raid on Godfrey Ranch, also known as Skirmish with Indians at Godfrey's Ranch, occurred from January 15–16, 1865 in which a large band of Lakota and Cheyenne warriors attacked an isolated ranch in Colorado owned by Holon Godfrey. The raid was one of the numerous January raids committed by the Cheyenne and their Indian allies as retaliation for the Sand Creek massacre that happened on November 29, 1864 during the Colorado War. After their victory at the Battle of Julesburg, the Indians raided up and down the South Platte River valley. Among the ranches the Indians attacked was the American Ranch, in which a white family and some of their workers perished before the Cheyenne set their sights on Godfrey's ranch nearby. Godfrey learned of the Indians' upcoming attack and fortified his ranch together with his family and ranch hands. At night, Godfrey estimated that 130 Indian warriors surrounded and attacked his ranch. The men inside managed to hold off them off the whole night. By morning, one of Godfrey's men managed to sneak out of the siege and call for help from the U.S. cavalry, which forced the Indians to finally retreat. The ranch, though burned and having lost some of its horses, remained standing and Godfrey's stand was successful. Godfrey christened his ranch as Fort Wicked.

== Background ==
The attack was part of a larger conflict in Colorado between white settlers and their neighboring Indian tribes. Tension arose when both parties started arming themselves because of distrust that stemmed from atrocities committed by both sides. Many Indians, who sided with the Dog Soldiers society, started raiding military outposts and settlements throughout the territory. In the Sand Creek Massacre, a Colorado militia consisting of white volunteers retaliated by attacking a Cheyenne village which had declared itself as peaceful and displayed U.S. and white flags. The militiamen may have killed more than 200 Indians, mostly women and children. This would set up many of the war’s future events, and enraged the Indians who further increased their raids, focusing much of them on the Colorado ranching business. Ranches, farms, and cattle drives were soon raided upon in the span of a month. The raids weren't just a retaliation in the Indian's part, they were also important for them to gather resources such as horses.

Holon Godfrey heard of the Indian's warpath coming towards them after a raid on American Ranch occurred a night before which killed almost an entire family of white settlers. Godfrey quickly took action to fortify his ranch in order to avoid suffering the same fate. He surrounded his ranch with 6-foot tall adobe walls and fireports, as well as well-placed shooting nests and bucket brigades in case of fire. Together with his wife, cowboys, and others who sought refuge, they prepared themselves to stand their ground.

== Attack ==
On the night of January 15, Godfrey claimed that a band consisting of 130 Lakota and Cheyenne warriors besieged his ranch. On horseback and encircling the ranch, the Indians tried to punch their way through the well-fortified position. Godfrey's fort repulsed the Indians’ numerous attempts. The women inside loaded the guns, even melting lead bars to make bullets, and the men fired from well-stationed gun ports.

The Indians managed to break into the corral and steal the horses inside, but Godfrey insisted that his men leave it be as their main priority was to defend those inside. Having their attacks on the main house repulsed, the Indians tried setting fire to the dry grass surrounding the ranch to burn the building down. The defenders quickly put the fire out with buckets of water that were already prepared. At one point, as Godfrey and his men were trying to put out a fire, a warrior suddenly ambushed the rancher by the front, who was shot and killed. When the initial attacks failed, the Indians started shooting flaming arrows at the ranch's roof and dry grass that surrounded it, but these too were extinguished quickly by the ranchers.

One of the ranch hands named Perkins volunteered to get help from the outside. He was able to sneak out during the night and sent a telegraph message to Denver asking for help. He managed to contact the military, though only four soldiers accompanied him to the ranch. By morning, the Indians gave up and departed before Perkins' reinforcements arrived.

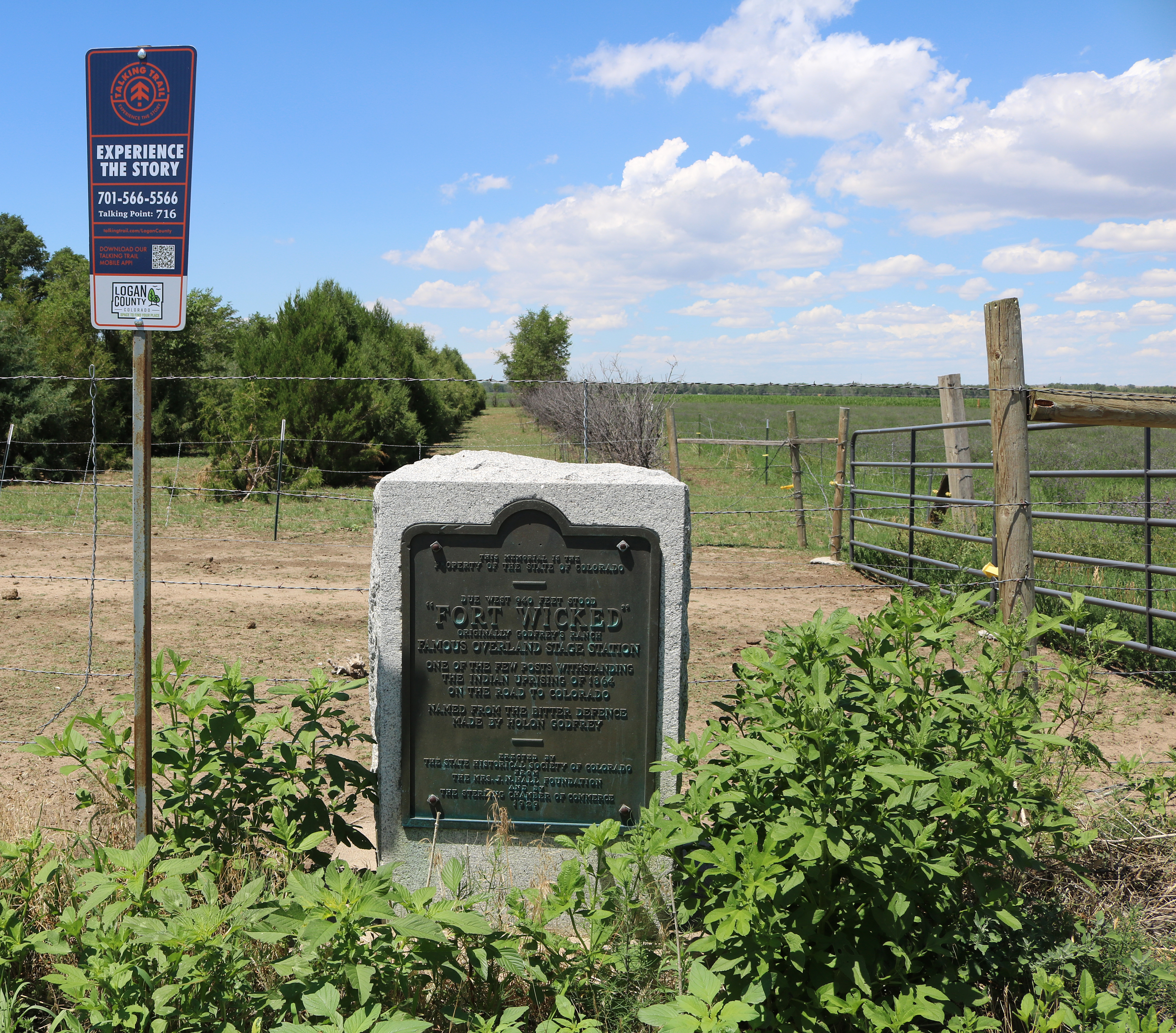
The Fort Wicked historical marker

== Aftermath ==
Between zero and 17 Indians were estimated to have been killed by Godfrey and his men during the defense. Col. Robert R. Livingston of the 1st Nevada Cavalry was the first to report of the attack, which he entitled "Skirmish with Indians at Godfrey's Ranch". Godfrey, on the other hand, christened his ranch as Fort Wicked. His story was published in the New York Tribune, Harper's Weekly, and today a historical marker stands near Merino to commemorate the event.

George Bent, a Cheyenne warrior and a participant in the war, recounted many events during the raids along the South Platte. He describes attacks on ranches, but not specifically the Godfrey Ranch, and he discounts many exaggerated claims of casualties among the Indians, saying that "about the only Indians I can remember being killed in these raids and small fights with the troops" were "three Sioux" killed in an attack on a wagon train.

== Bibliography ==
- Godfrey, Michael L. Footprints in the Sand: The Godfrey Story, Lulu, 2012.
