= List of battles fought in Colorado =

Coordinates: 38.9972°N 105.5478°W

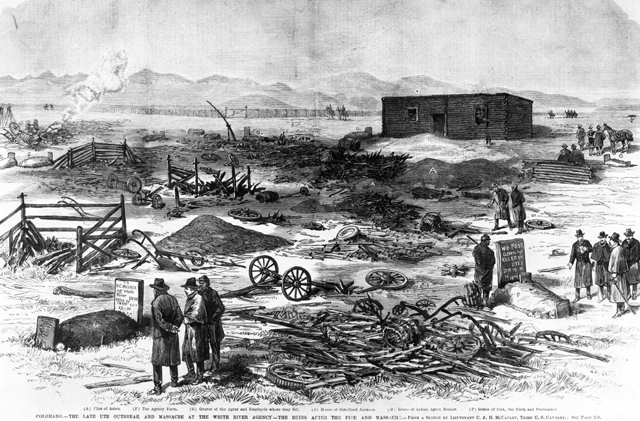
Illustration from Frank Leslie's Illustrated Newspaper, December 6, 1879, depicting the aftermath of the Meeker Massacre. Meeker's grave is at lower left; W. H. Post's grave is at lower right.

This list of battles fought in Colorado is an incomplete list of military and other armed confrontations that have occurred within the boundaries of the modern U.S. State of Colorado since European contact. The region was part of the Viceroyalty of New Spain from 1535 to 1682, New France from 1682 to 1762, Kingdom of Spain from 1762 to 1800, French First Republic 1800 to 1803, and part of the United States of America 1803–present (boundaries were disputed by Spain). The southern portion of Colorado was considered by Spain as part of its northern territories. Large portions of Colorado were subsequently under the administrative control of Mexico from 1800 to 1835, and the Republic of Texas from 1836 to 1846. Full administrative control of Colorado was established on February 2, 1848 with the signing of the Treaty of Guadalupe Hidalgo which ended the Mexican–American War.

The Plains Indian Wars directly affected the region during westward expansion. By the end of the Nineteenth Century, Colorado became a focal point of labor violence and the Coal Wars, with instances of large-scale armed conflict between workers, private detectives, and state soldiers and police stretching into the 1920s.

== Battles ==
Name	Date	Location	War	Campaign	Dead	Belligerents
Sand Creek Massacre	November 29, 1864	near modern Eads	Colorado War		187 (Note: Reports of Native Americans killed in action vary from 70 to 163.)	United States of America vs. Cheyenne & Arapaho
Battle of Julesburg	January 7, 1865	near modern Julesburg	Colorado War		14	United States of America & civilian volunteers vs. Cheyenne, Arapaho, & Lakota Sioux
American Ranch massacre	January 14, 1865	near modern Sterling	Colorado War		10	United States of America vs. Cheyenne & Sioux
Battle of Beecher Island	September 17–19, 1868	modern Yuma County	Comanche campaign		41 (Note: Reports of Native Americans killed in action vary from 9 to 32.)	United States of America vs. Arapaho, Cheyenne & Lakota Sioux
Battle of Summit Springs	July 11, 1869	near modern Sterling	Comanche campaign		~35	United States of America vs. Arapaho, Cheyenne & Sioux
Meeker Massacre	September 29, 1879	White River Indian Agency, near modern Meeker			11	White River Ute vs. United States civilians
Battle of Milk Creek	September 29 - October 25, 1879	near modern Meeker	Ute Wars	White River War	32–50 (Note: 13 US soldiers killed in the action; Native Americans killed varies from 19-37.)	White River Ute vs. United States of America
Battle of Berwind Canyon	October 24, 1913	Berwind	Coal Wars	Colorado Coalfield War	1	Colorado Fuel and Iron Company, Baldwin-Felts Detective Agency, & Colorado National Guard vs. United Mine Workers of America
Ludlow Massacre	April 20, 1914	Ludlow	Coal Wars	Colorado Coalfield War	23–29	Colorado Fuel and Iron Company, Colorado National Guard, & Baldwin-Felts Detective Agency vs United Mine Workers of America
Battle of Walsenburg	April 28–29, 1914	Walsenburg	Coal Wars	Colorado Coalfield War	3+	United Mine Workers of America-aligned strikers vs. Colorado National Guard
Battle of Forbes	April 30, 1914	Forbes	Coal Wars	Colorado Coalfield War	12+	United Mine Workers of America and other armed strikers vs. Rocky Mountain Fuel Company mine guards and streakbreakers
Columbine Mine massacre	November 21, 1927	Serene	Coal Wars		6	Rocky Mountain Fuel Company, Colorado Mounted Rangers & Colorado National Guard vs. United Mine Workers of America-aligned strikers

== See also ==
- Plains Indians Wars
- Bibliography of Colorado
- Geography of Colorado
- History of Colorado
- Index of Colorado-related articles
- List of Colorado-related lists
- Outline of Colorado
