= Padroni, Colorado =

Census-designated place in Logan County, CO, USA

- Census-designated place
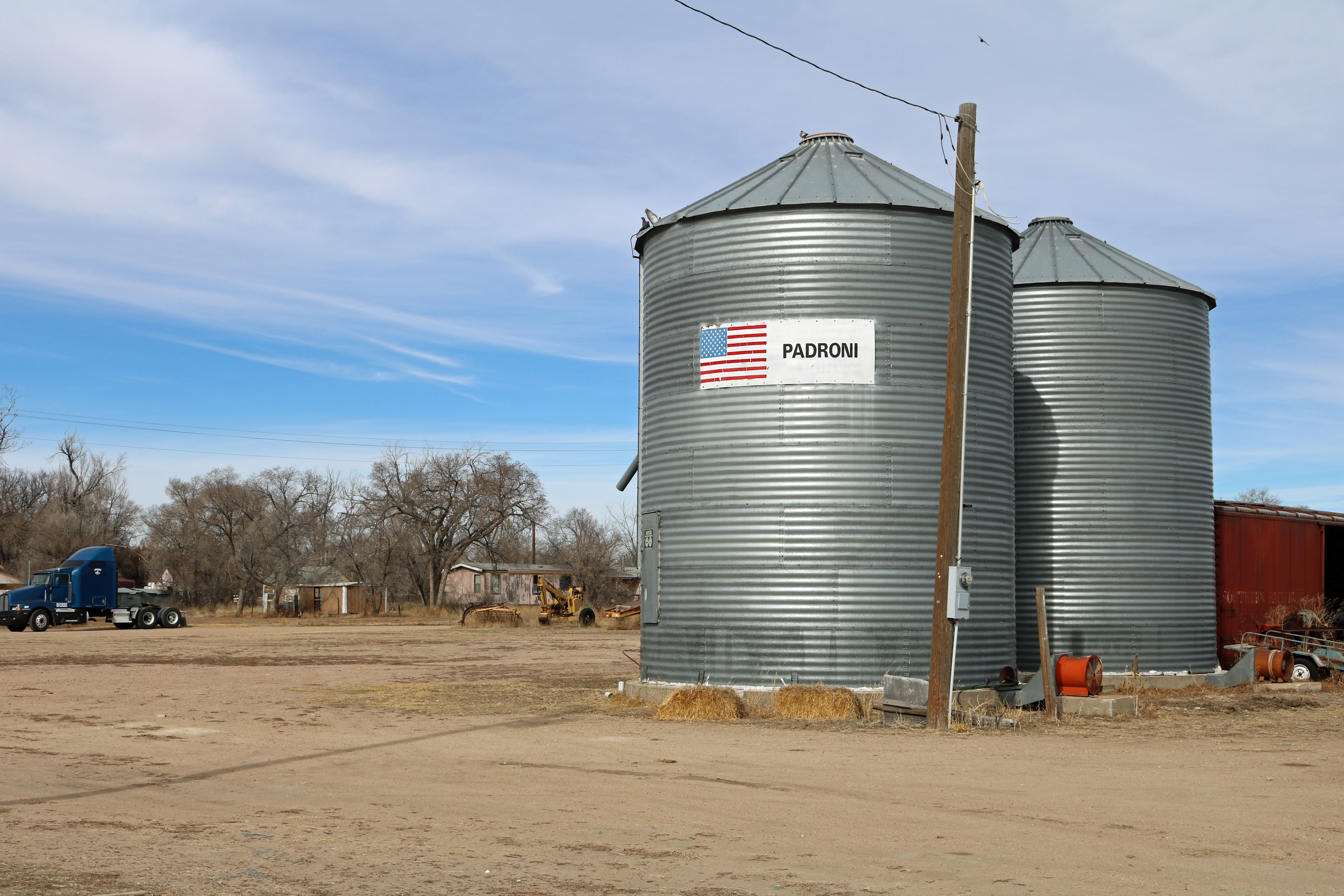
- Grain silos in Padroni.

- Location of the Padroni CDP in Logan County, Colorado
- Coordinates: 40°46′55″N 103°10′24″W
- Country: United States
- State: Colorado
- County: Logan County
- Platted: 1909

Government
  - Type: unincorporated community

Area
  - Total: 0.811 sq mi (2.101 km^{2})
  - Land: 0.811 sq mi (2.101 km^{2})
  - Water: 0 sq mi (0.000 km^{2})
- Elevation: 4,013 ft (1,223 m)

Population (2020)
  - Total: 75
  - Density: 92/sq mi (36/km^{2})
- Time zone: UTC-7 (MST)
  - Summer (DST): UTC-6 (MDT)
- ZIP Code: 80745
- Area code: 970
- GNIS feature ID: 2409014

Padroni is an unincorporated town, a census-designated place (CDP), and a post office located in and governed by Logan County, Colorado, United States. The CDP is a part of the Sterling, CO Micropolitan Statistical Area. The Padroni post office has the ZIP Code 80745. At the United States Census 2020, the population of the Padroni CDP was 75.

== History ==
Padroni was named for George and Tom Padroni, early settlers.

== Geography ==
Padroni is located just northwest of the center of Logan County. It is on County Route 43, 11 miles (18 km) north of Sterling, the county seat, and 16 miles (26 km) southwest of Peetz.

The Padroni CDP has an area of 519 acres (2.101 km^{2}), all land.

== Demographics ==
The United States Census Bureau initially defined the Padroni CDP for the United States Census 2000.

Padroni CDP, Colorado
Year	Pop.	±%
2000	97	—
2010	76	−21.6%
2020	75	−1.3%
Source: United States Census Bureau

== See also ==
- Sterling, CO Micropolitan Statistical Area
