= Colorado State Highway 113 =

State highway in Colorado, United States

State Highway 113
- SH 113 highlighted in red

Route information
- Maintained by CDOT
- Length: 18.8 mi (30.3 km)

Major junctions
- South end: US 138 northeast of Sterling
- North end: N-19 at the Nebraska state line near Peetz

Location
- Country: United States
- State: Colorado
- Counties: Logan

Highway system
- Colorado State Highway System; Interstate; US; State; Scenic
← SH 112	→ SH 114

State Highway 113 (SH 113) is an 18.8-mile-long (30.3 km) state highway in northeastern Colorado. It runs from U.S. Highway 138 (US 138) in rural Logan County north to Nebraska Highway 19 (N-19) at the Nebraska state line.

== Route description ==
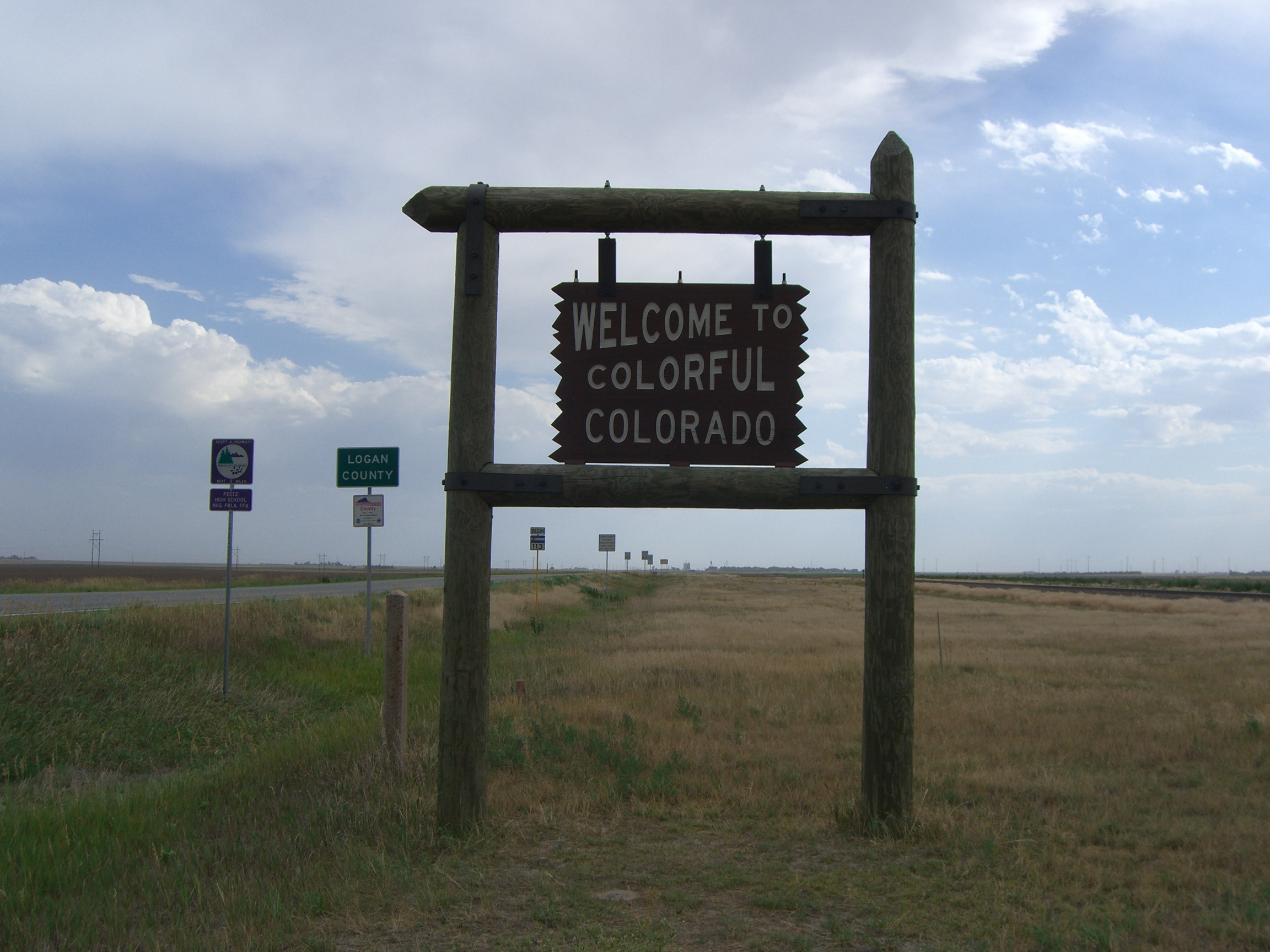
Northern terminus where SH 113 enters from Nebraska

SH 113 begins at a junction with US 138 approximately nine miles (14 km) northeast of Sterling and proceeds north for almost 16 miles (26 km) before passing through the small town of Peetz and continuing a further three miles (4.8 km) northeast to the Nebraska state line, where the road becomes N-19.

== History ==
The route was established in the 1920s with its current routing from U.S. Highway 138 to Nebraska Highway 19 at the Nebraska state line. The route was entirely paved by 1939. Since then, there have been no major alignment changes in the routing.

== Major intersections ==
The entire route is in Logan County.

Location	mi	km	Destinations	Notes
	0.000	0.000	US 138 – Iliff, Sterling	Southern terminus
	18.830	30.304	N-19 north – Sidney	Continuation beyond Nebraska state line
1.000 mi = 1.609 km; 1.000 km = 0.621 mi
