= Dailey, Colorado =

Unincorporated community in Colorado, US

- Unincorporated community
- Location of Dailey, Colorado. Dailey (Colorado)
- Coordinates: 40.6567°N 102.7238°W
- Country: United States
- State: Colorado
- County: Logan

Government
  - Type: unincorporated community
  - Body: Logan County
- Elevation: 4,144 ft (1,263 m)
- Time zone: UTC−07:00 (MST)
  - Summer (DST): UTC−06:00 (MDT)
- ZIP code: Sterling 80751
- Area codes: 970/748
- GNIS place ID: 182772

Dailey is an unincorporated community located in eastern Logan County, Colorado, United States. Dailey is a part of the Sterling, CO Micropolitan Statistical Area.

== History ==
The Dailey, Colorado, post office operated from June 28, 1915, until July 7, 1961. The Fleming and Haxtun, Colorado, post office (ZIP code 80728 and 80731) now serves the area. The community was named after James Dailey, a railroad official.

== See also ==
- Sterling, CO Micropolitan Statistical Area
- List of populated places in Colorado
- List of post offices in Colorado
