= North Sterling State Park =

State park in Logan County, Colorado

- IUCN category III (natural monument or feature)
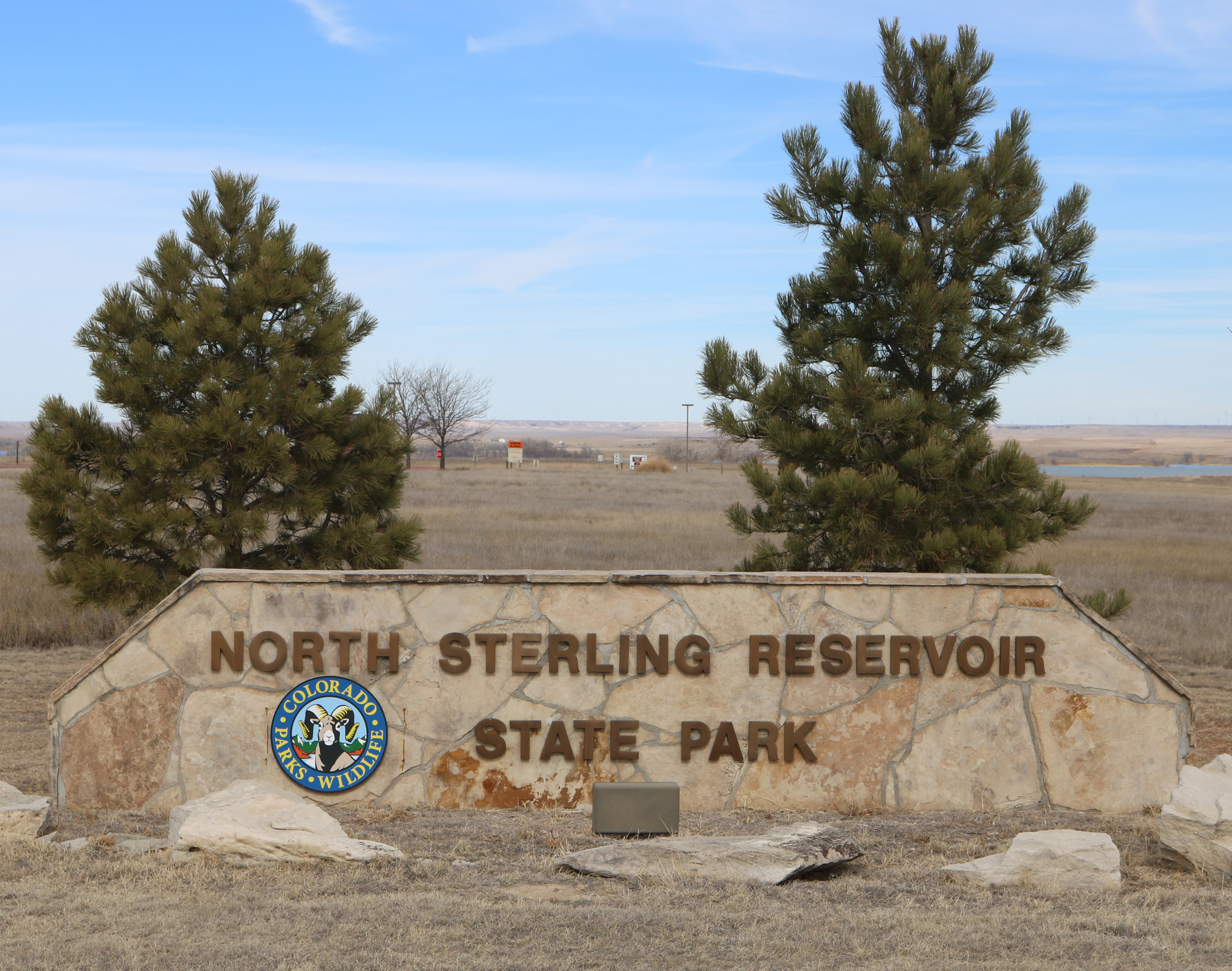
- The park entrance sign.

- Location within Colorado
- Location: Logan County, Colorado, USA
- Nearest city: Sterling, CO
- Coordinates: 40°47′21″N 103°15′55″W
- Area: 5,022 acres (2,032 hectares)
- Established: 1992
- Visitors: 222,735 (in 2021)
- Governing body: Colorado Parks and Wildlife

North Sterling State Park is a state park in northeastern Colorado, located approximately 11 miles north of Sterling, Colorado in Logan County. The park encompasses 5,022 acres (2,032 hectares) of land and water, centered around the North Sterling Reservoir.

== History ==
The reservoir was constructed in 1911 by the North Sterling Irrigation District to provide agricultural water storage. The surrounding land remained largely undeveloped until 1992, when the area was designated as a state park managed by Colorado Parks and Wildlife.

== Recreation ==
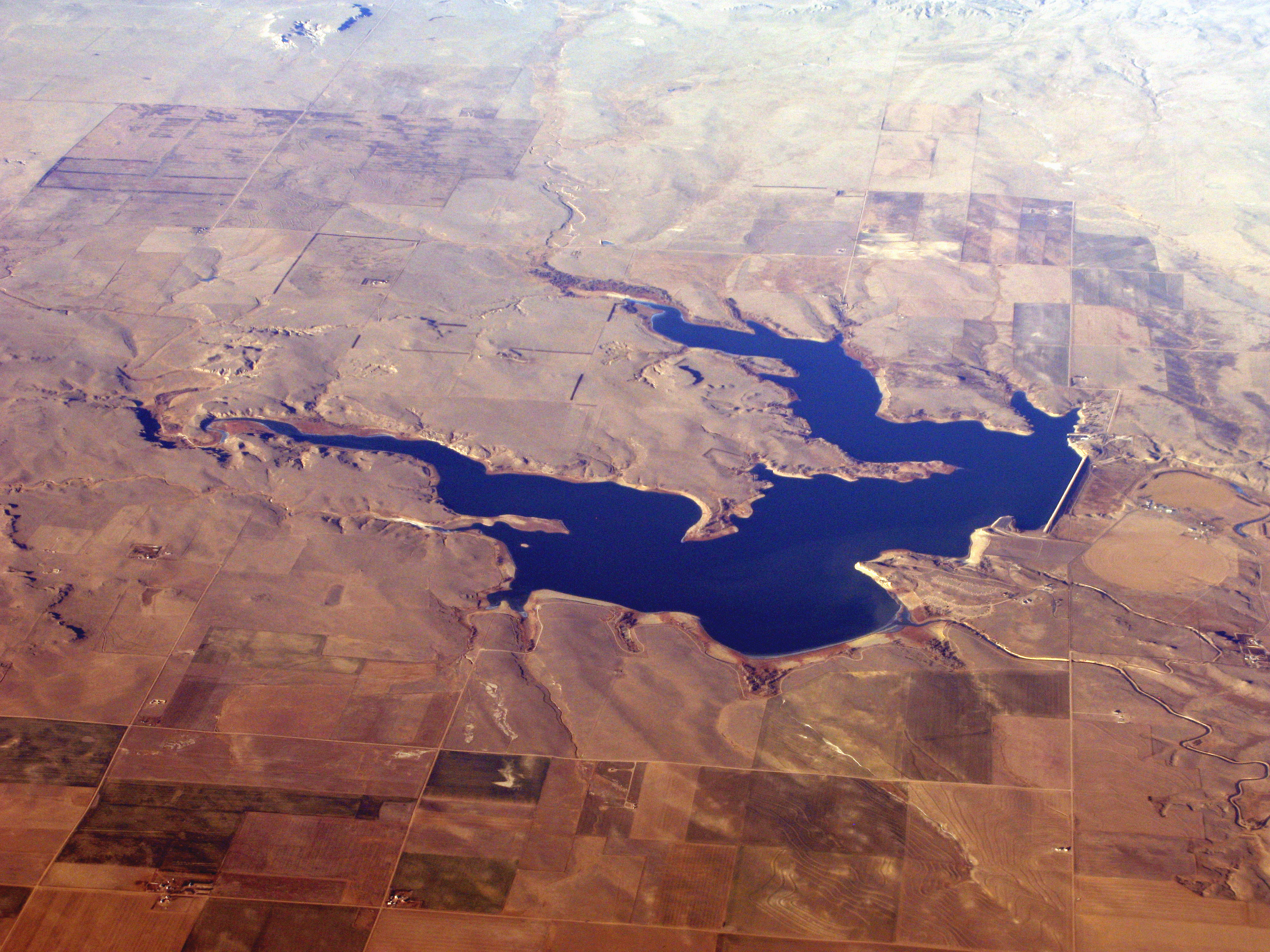
Aerial view of the reservoir

Recreational opportunities include fishing, boating, camping, hiking, and wildlife observation. The reservoir covers approximately 2,880 acres (1,170 ha) and supports warm-water fish species such as walleye, wiper, channel catfish, largemouth bass, and yellow perch. The park contains three boat ramps and a designated swim beach during summer months. There are over 100 campsites spread across three campgrounds, with a mix of electric and non-electric sites.

Several short trails totaling about 6 miles (9.7 km) are available for walking or wildlife viewing. Common wildlife includes deer, waterfowl, and raptors, especially during spring and fall migration.

== Facilities ==
Facilities include a visitor center, picnic areas, restrooms, a dump station, and parking areas. Aquatic Nuisance Species (ANS) inspections are conducted seasonally at boat ramps.

== Ecology ==
The park lies in the western High Plains and consists primarily of shortgrass prairie. Vegetation includes blue grama, buffalo grass, yucca, and rabbitbrush. The reservoir and its adjacent wetlands provide habitat for migratory birds and are part of the South Platte River corridor.

== Access ==
North Sterling State Park is open year-round. A valid Colorado State Parks pass is required for entry. Campsites may be reserved in advance through the state parks reservation system.
