= Nebraska Highway 19 =

State highway in Nebraska, U.S.

State Highway 19

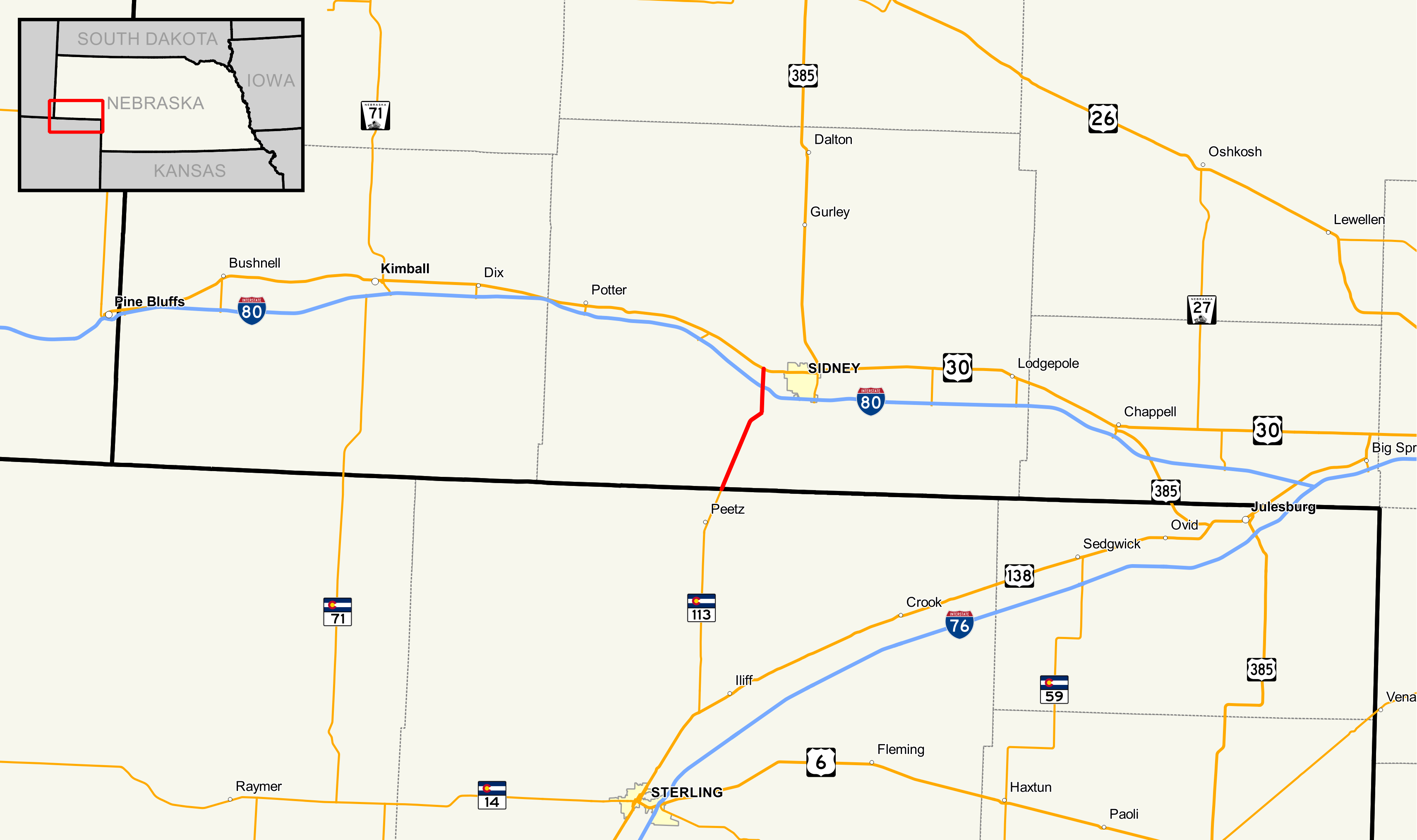
- Nebraska Highway 19 highlighted in red

Route information
- Maintained by NDOT
- Length: 10.91 mi (17.56 km)
- Existed: 1925–present

Major junctions
- South end: SH 113 south of Lorenzo
- I-80 west of Sidney
- North end: US 30 west of Sidney

Location
- Country: United States
- State: Nebraska
- Counties: Cheyenne

Highway system
- Nebraska State Highway System; Interstate; US; State; Link; Spur; State Spurs; Recreation
← N-18	→ US 20

Nebraska Highway 19 is a highway in Nebraska. It has a southern terminus at the Colorado border south of Sidney and a northern terminus west of Sidney at an intersection with U.S. Highway 30.

== Route description ==
Nebraska Highway 19 begins at the Colorado border at a point which is also the north terminus of Colorado State Highway 113. It goes northeasterly through Lorenzo. It continues this way, then goes due north shortly before meeting Interstate 80 at Exit 55 of that interstate highway. It continues due north and ends at U.S. Highway 30 west of Sidney.

== History ==
Nebraska Highway 19 was a highway which spanned the width of the Nebraska Panhandle. It followed the original route of U.S. Highway 385, going north to the South Dakota border. In 1958, US 385 was designated over the former route of Nebraska Highway 19 north of Sidney. Today, the former route follows US 385 except for the section north of Alliance, which follows Nebraska Highway 2 in Alliance, Nebraska Highway 87 north out of Alliance, and Nebraska Link 7E west from N-87 to the current US 385.

== Major intersections ==
The entire route is in Cheyenne County.

Location	mi	km	Destinations	Notes
	0.00	0.00	SH 113 south – Sterling	Continuation into Colorado
	7.12	11.46	Road 19A – I-80 interchange No. 59	Serves Sidney Municipal Airport
	9.41	15.14	I-80 – Cheyenne WY, North Platte	Exit 55 on I-80; former western terminus of I-80 Bus.
	10.91	17.56	US 30 (Lincoln Highway) – Kimball, Sidney	Northern terminus; US 30 east is former I-80 Bus. east
1.000 mi = 1.609 km; 1.000 km = 0.621 mi

== See also ==
- List of state highways in Nebraska
