= Logan County, Colorado =

County in Colorado, United States

- County
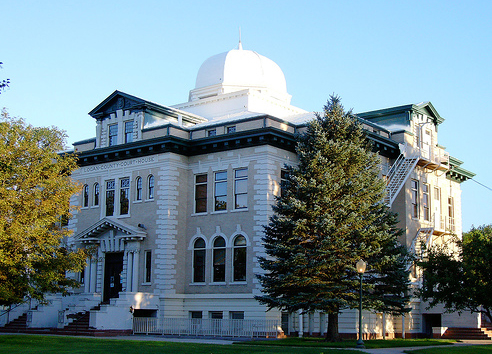
- Logan County Courthouse

- Location within the U.S. state of Colorado
- Coordinates: 40.73°N 103.11°W
- Country: United States
- State: Colorado
- Founded: February 25, 1887
- Named for: John A. Logan
- Seat: Sterling
- Largest city: Sterling

Area
  - Total: 1,845 sq mi (4,780 km^{2})
  - Land: 1,839 sq mi (4,760 km^{2})
  - Water: 6.3 sq mi (16 km^{2}) 0.3%

Population (2020)
  - Total: 21,528
  - Estimate (2025): 20,654 ▼
  - Density: 11.71/sq mi (4.520/km^{2})
- Time zone: UTC−7 (Mountain)
  - Summer (DST): UTC−6 (MDT)
- Congressional district: 4th
- Website: logancounty.colorado.gov

Logan County is a county located in the U.S. state of Colorado. As of the 2020 census, the population was 21,528. The county seat is Sterling. The county was named for General John A. Logan. Logan County comprises the Sterling micropolitan area (a Micropolitan Statistical Area).

== Geography ==
According to the U.S. Census Bureau, the county has a total area of 1,845 square miles (4,780 km^{2}), of which 1,839 square miles (4,760 km^{2}) is land and 6.3 square miles (16 km^{2}) (0.3%) is water.

=== Adjacent counties ===
- Cheyenne County, Nebraska - north
- Phillips County - east
- Sedgwick County - east
- Yuma County - southeast
- Washington County - south
- Morgan County - southwest
- Weld County - west
- Kimball County, Nebraska - northwest

=== Major highways ===
- Interstate 76
- I-76 BS
- U.S. Highway 6
- U.S. Highway 138
- State Highway 14
- State Highway 61
- State Highway 63
- State Highway 113

=== Transit ===
- Burlington Trailways
- Express Arrow

=== State protected area ===
- North Sterling State Park

=== Trails and byways ===
- American Discovery Trail
- Pawnee Pioneer Trails
- South Platte Trail

== Demographics ==
Historical population
Census	Pop.	Note	%±
1890	3,070		—
1900	3,292		7.2%
1910	9,549		190.1%
1920	18,427		93.0%
1930	19,946		8.2%
1940	18,370		−7.9%
1950	17,187		−6.4%
1960	20,302		18.1%
1970	18,852		−7.1%
1980	19,800		5.0%
1990	17,567		−11.3%
2000	20,504		16.7%
2010	22,709		10.8%
2020	21,528		−5.2%
2025 (est.)	20,654	▼	−4.1%
U.S. Decennial Census; 1790–1960 1900–1990; 1990–2000 2010–2020

A July 1, 2009, U.S. Census Bureau estimate placed the population at 20,772.

=== 2020 census ===
As of the 2020 census, the county had a population of 21,528. Of the residents, 19.0% were under the age of 18 and 18.3% were 65 years of age or older; the median age was 39.6 years. For every 100 females there were 127.3 males, and for every 100 females age 18 and over there were 131.9 males. 57.0% of residents lived in urban areas and 43.0% lived in rural areas.

Logan County, Colorado – Racial and ethnic composition Note: the US Census treats Hispanic/Latino as an ethnic category. This table excludes Latinos from the racial categories and assigns them to a separate category. Hispanics/Latinos may be of any race.
Race / Ethnicity (NH = Non-Hispanic)	Pop 2000	Pop 2010	Pop 2020	% 2000	% 2010	% 2020
White alone (NH)	17,310	17,754	16,337	84.42%	78.18%	75.89%
Black or African American alone (NH)	411	881	753	2.00%	3.88%	3.50%
Native American or Alaska Native alone (NH)	89	177	161	0.43%	0.78%	0.75%
Asian alone (NH)	77	117	119	0.38%	0.52%	0.55%
Pacific Islander alone (NH)	11	13	17	0.05%	0.06%	0.08%
Other race alone (NH)	3	15	52	0.01%	0.07%	0.24%
Mixed race or Multiracial (NH)	164	201	578	0.80%	0.89%	2.68%
Hispanic or Latino (any race)	2,439	3,551	3,511	11.90%	15.64%	16.31%
Total	20,504	22,709	21,528	100.00%	100.00%	100.00%

The racial makeup of the county was 80.2% White, 3.6% Black or African American, 1.1% American Indian and Alaska Native, 0.6% Asian, 0.1% Native Hawaiian and Pacific Islander, 7.5% from some other race, and 7.0% from two or more races. Hispanic or Latino residents of any race comprised 16.3% of the population.

There were 7,919 households in the county, of which 27.0% had children under the age of 18 living with them and 25.0% had a female householder with no spouse or partner present. About 32.0% of all households were made up of individuals and 13.5% had someone living alone who was 65 years of age or older.

There were 8,668 housing units, of which 8.6% were vacant. Among occupied housing units, 66.8% were owner-occupied and 33.2% were renter-occupied. The homeowner vacancy rate was 1.4% and the rental vacancy rate was 9.5%.

=== 2000 census ===
At the 2000 census there were 20,504 people, 7,551 households, and 5,066 families in the county. The population density was 11 people per square mile (4.2 people/km^{2}). There were 8,424 housing units at an average density of 5 per square mile (1.9/km^{2}). The racial makeup of the county was 91.65% White, 2.05% Black or African American, 0.64% Native American, 0.40% Asian, 0.07% Pacific Islander, 3.77% from other races, and 1.43% from two or more races. 11.90% of the population were Hispanic or Latino of any race.

Of the 7,551 households 31.90% had children under the age of 18 living with them, 54.80% were married couples living together, 8.60% had a female householder with no husband present, and 32.90% were non-families. 28.50% of households were one person and 12.40% were one person aged 65 or older. The average household size was 2.45 and the average family size was 3.02.

The age distribution was 24.70% under the age of 18, 10.80% from 18 to 24, 28.30% from 25 to 44, 21.70% from 45 to 64, and 14.50% 65 or older. The median age was 36 years. For every 100 females there were 112.00 males. For every 100 females age 18 and over, there were 114.60 males.

The median household income was $32,724 and the median family income was $42,241. Males had a median income of $28,155 versus $21,110 for females. The per capita income for the county was $16,721. About 9.00% of families and 12.20% of the population were below the poverty line, including 13.40% of those under age 18 and 10.90% of those age 65 or over.

== Politics ==
Logan County is strongly Republican in presidential elections. Since 1888, the county has failed to back the Republican candidate in only six presidential elections, most recently in 1964 in the midst of Lyndon B. Johnson's national landslide victory.

United States presidential election results for Logan County, Colorado
Year	Republican		Democratic		Third party(ies)	
Year	No.	%	No.	%	No.	%
1888	1,086	56.30%	669	34.68%	174	9.02%
1892	322	56.00%	0	0.00%	253	44.00%
1896	231	26.52%	603	69.23%	37	4.25%
1900	594	46.59%	583	45.73%	98	7.69%
1904	821	57.13%	486	33.82%	130	9.05%
1908	1,054	49.86%	950	44.94%	110	5.20%
1912	664	20.18%	1,338	40.66%	1,289	39.17%
1916	1,422	33.51%	2,679	63.14%	142	3.35%
1920	3,123	59.71%	1,893	36.20%	214	4.09%
1924	3,103	55.60%	946	16.95%	1,532	27.45%
1928	4,377	71.92%	1,620	26.62%	89	1.46%
1932	3,157	45.44%	3,641	52.41%	149	2.14%
1936	3,136	42.61%	4,070	55.30%	154	2.09%
1940	4,613	61.38%	2,819	37.51%	83	1.10%
1944	3,998	61.63%	2,471	38.09%	18	0.28%
1948	3,223	49.98%	3,179	49.30%	46	0.71%
1952	5,237	67.67%	2,459	31.77%	43	0.56%
1956	5,199	64.50%	2,841	35.25%	20	0.25%
1960	5,002	59.97%	3,334	39.97%	5	0.06%
1964	3,497	45.23%	4,222	54.61%	12	0.16%
1968	4,323	56.95%	2,521	33.21%	747	9.84%
1972	5,352	67.27%	2,426	30.49%	178	2.24%
1976	4,256	53.32%	3,543	44.39%	183	2.29%
1980	5,238	63.16%	2,332	28.12%	723	8.72%
1984	5,883	72.33%	2,155	26.50%	95	1.17%
1988	4,485	56.24%	3,382	42.41%	108	1.35%
1992	3,420	40.98%	2,718	32.57%	2,207	26.45%
1996	4,032	53.15%	2,765	36.45%	789	10.40%
2000	5,531	68.32%	2,296	28.36%	269	3.32%
2004	6,168	70.36%	2,491	28.42%	107	1.22%
2008	6,002	66.86%	2,846	31.70%	129	1.44%
2012	6,179	67.72%	2,712	29.72%	233	2.55%
2016	7,282	74.90%	1,851	19.04%	589	6.06%
2020	8,087	76.79%	2,218	21.06%	227	2.16%
2024	7,855	77.27%	2,098	20.64%	213	2.10%

United States Senate election results for Logan County, Colorado2
Year	Republican		Democratic		Third party(ies)	
Year	No.	%	No.	%	No.	%
2020	8,167	77.92%	2,117	20.20%	197	1.88%

United States Senate election results for Logan County, Colorado3
Year	Republican		Democratic		Third party(ies)	
Year	No.	%	No.	%	No.	%
2022	5,980	72.37%	1,954	23.65%	329	3.98%

Colorado Gubernatorial election results for Logan County
Year	Republican		Democratic		Third party(ies)	
Year	No.	%	No.	%	No.	%
2022	5,925	71.77%	1,860	22.53%	471	5.70%

== Communities ==
=== City ===
- Sterling

=== Towns ===
- Crook
- Fleming
- Iliff
- Merino
- Peetz

=== Census-designated places ===
- Atwood
- Padroni

=== Unincorporated communities ===
- Dailey
- Proctor
- Saint Petersburg
- Willard

=== Ghost towns ===
- Ackerman
- Armstrong
- Beta
- Buchanan
- Galien
- Graylin
- Griff
- Jessica
- Kelly
- Lesy
- Logan
- Marcott
- Mount Hope
- New Haven
- Powell
- Red Lion
- Rockland
- Selma
- Shahan
- Tobin
- Twin Mills
- Westplains
- Winston

== See also ==
- Bibliography of Colorado
- Geography of Colorado
- History of Colorado
  - National Register of Historic Places listings in Logan County, Colorado
- Index of Colorado-related articles
- List of Colorado-related lists
  - List of counties in Colorado
  - List of statistical areas in Colorado
- Outline of Colorado
