= Saint Petersburg, Colorado =

Unincorporated community in Logan County, CO, USA

Coordinates: 40°32′20″N 102°49′02″W

- Named after: (Saint Petersburg) Sankt-Petersburg, (Russia) Rossiya

Saint Petersburg is an unincorporated community in Logan County, in the U.S. state of Colorado.

The community derives its name from Pete Lousberg, who built the town a church in exchange for the naming rights.
