= American Ranch massacre =

American Ranch Massacre
- Part of the Colorado War
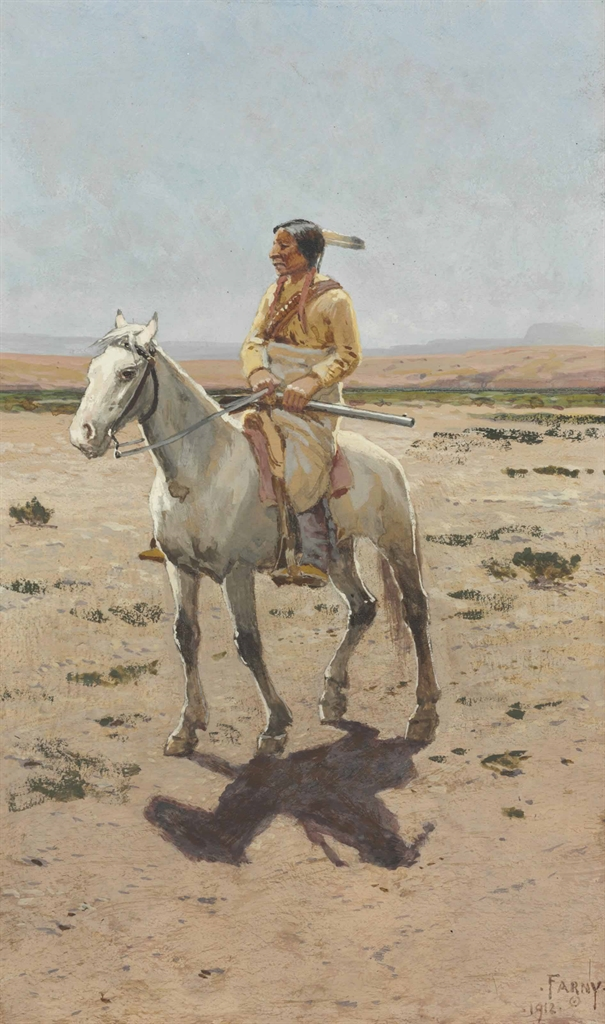
- "Cheyenne Scout" by Henry F. Farny.
Date	January 14, 1865
Location	Colorado Territory; Near present-day Sterling, Colorado 40.472241°N 103.343643°W
Result	Cheyenne/Lakota victory

Belligerents
United States	Cheyenne; Sioux

Commanders and leaders
N/A	unknown

Strength
3 civilians 5 cowboys	~100 warriors

Casualties and losses
7 killed 1 wounded 3 captured	3 killed
- The three captives were Sarah Morris and her sons, one of whom was killed later on.

The American Ranch massacre occurred in 1865 during the Colorado War. Cheyenne and Sioux warriors attacked a ranch near present-day Sterling, Colorado where they killed all of the male settlers and took three captives.

== Massacre ==
In the first winter of 1865, the Lakota Sioux and the Cheyenne were raiding in the Colorado Eastern Plains when they attacked American Ranch, about thirteen miles up the South Platte River. On the morning of January 14, two ranch hands named Gus Hall and Big Steve were crossing the South Platte to cut wood when around 100 natives on horseback appeared. A skirmish began and Big Steve was killed, Hall was shot in the ankle and was forced to defend a part of the sand bluffs by the river. Some of the warriors remained behind to harass Hall while the rest proceeded to American Ranch. At the ranch were Bill Morris and his wife Sarah with two young boys and five cowboys. The Cheyenne and Lakota charged in shooting and quickly set the buildings of the ranch on fire forcing the ranchers away from cover where they were killed. Sarah Morris was about to be killed when a warrior named White White saved her to keep for himself. The two young boys were also taken and one was later killed while in captivity. Gus Hall watched the massacre at the ranch from across the river but because of his wound, he was unable to do anything. One of the natives snuck up behind the wounded cowboy while he was distracted and shot an arrow that cut Hall's chest and landed behind him. Hall then shot and killed the bowman with his revolver.

After this, the Indians moved on to continue raiding so Hall had to walk twelve miles down the river to Wisconsin Ranch which was also attacked during the war. Though wounded twice in the foot and across his chest, Hall managed to survive the cold journey and eventually relayed his account of the event to the United States Army who arrived at Wisconsin Ranch soon after. At American Ranch, the soldiers found ten bodies, seven whites and three natives next to whiskey decanters. Hall later said that Bill Morris intended to poison the whiskey with strychnine because he suspected an attack and knew the Cheyenne and Lakota would drink his alcohol.

== See also ==
- American Indian Wars
- List of battles fought in Colorado
- Fort Wicked, nearby scene of the attack
- Navajo Wars
