= Peetz, Colorado =

Town in Colorado, United States

- Town
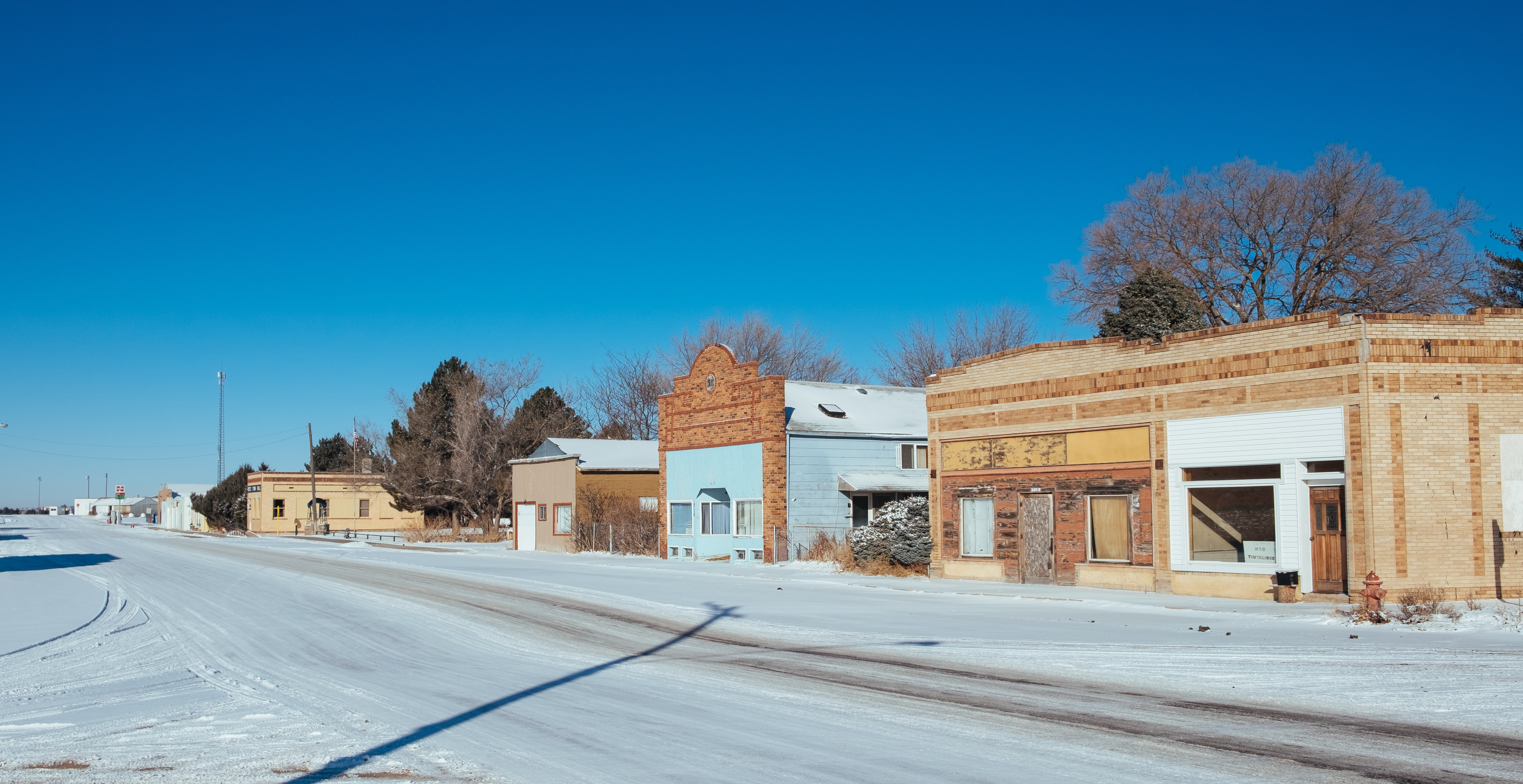
- Main Street in Peetz

- Location in Logan County, Colorado
- Coordinates: 40°57′43″N 103°06′50″W
- Country: United States
- State: Colorado
- County: Logan County
- Incorporated (town): May 17, 1917

Government
  - Type: Statutory town

Area
  - Total: 0.22 sq mi (0.58 km^{2})
  - Land: 0.22 sq mi (0.58 km^{2})
  - Water: 0 sq mi (0.00 km^{2})
- Elevation: 4,433 ft (1,351 m)

Population (2020)
  - Total: 213
  - Density: 950/sq mi (370/km^{2})
- Time zone: UTC-7 (MST)
  - Summer (DST): UTC-6 (MDT)
- ZIP code: 80747
- Area code: 970
- FIPS code: 08-58235
- GNIS feature ID: 2413123
- Website: Official website

Peetz is a statutory town in Logan County, Colorado, United States. The population was 213 at the 2020 census.

== History ==
The community was named after Peter Peetz, an early settler.

== Geography ==
According to the United States Census Bureau, the town has a total area of 0.19 square miles (0.49 km^{2}), all of it land.

Peetz is located on the Peetz Plateau.

== Demographics ==
Historical population
Census	Pop.	Note	%±
1920	322		—
1930	244		−24.2%
1940	207		−15.2%
1950	232		12.1%
1960	218		−6.0%
1970	186		−14.7%
1980	220		18.3%
1990	179		−18.6%
2000	227		26.8%
2010	238		4.8%
2020	213		−10.5%
U.S. Decennial Census

== Economy ==
Peetz's commerce mainly is focused on farming. In the town of Peetz, there is one restaurant/bar (the Hot Spot), a grain elevator and service station (Peetz Co-op), a telephone and internet provider (Peetz Telephone Company), and a laundromat.

== Education ==
Peetz is home to the RE-5 School District and Peetz K-12 School.

== Transportation ==
There are no forms of public transportation in Peetz, but a BNSF Railway line runs past the town. Peetz lies next to Colorado State Highway 113.

== See also ==
- Sterling, CO Micropolitan Statistical Area
- Peetz Wind Farm
