= South Platte Trail =

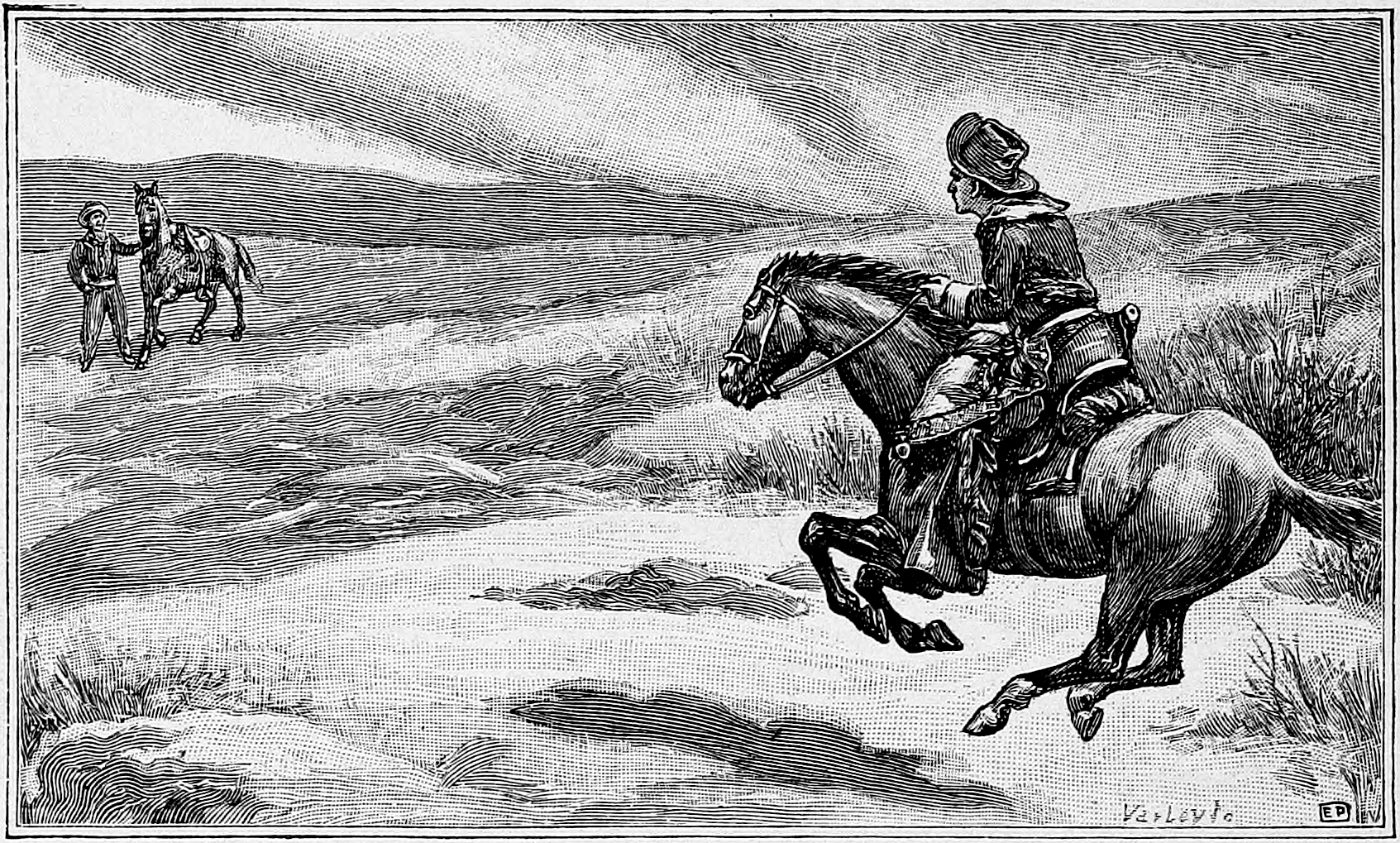
Pony Express across the Plains

South Platte Trail was a historic trail that followed the southern side of South Platte River from Fort Kearny in Nebraska to Denver, Colorado. Plains Indians, such as the Cheyenne and the Arapaho, hunted in the lands around the South Platte River. They also traded at trading posts along the route, as did white travelers. Travelers included trappers, traders, explorers, the military, and those following the gold rush. The trail was also used by the Pony Express.

Stage stations provided fresh horses and food. Simple buildings of sod, logs, or adobe, the stations were located about every 10 to 15 miles apart along the trail. In some cases, they also offered lodging and supplies for travelers.

== History ==
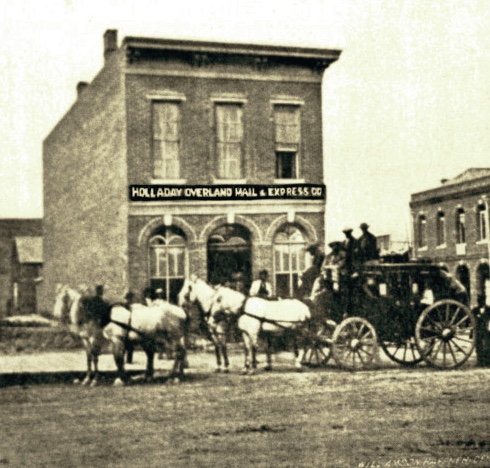
The Holladay Overland Mail & Express Co. stagecoach office was on the southwest corner of fifteenth and Market Streets in Denver. Circa 1860s.

Julesburg, established in 1850, was a supply hub for Denver via the South Platte Trail. It became an important station on the Overland Stage Route for the delivery of passengers and mail between Atchison, Kansas and Salt Lake City. The Overland Trail followed much of the South Platte Trail to and from Denver, before heading north to Wyoming. Julesburg was also near the connection to the Oregon-California Trail at the North Platte River.

It is estimated that the Pike's Peak Gold Rush drew about 100,000 people to Colorado. There were three routes, the safest of which was the South Platte Trail, the others were Smoky Hill Trail and the Oregon Trail to Fort Laramie and then south to Denver. In 1859, a branch of the trail away from the South Platte River was established in the wilderness near the present day city of Fort Morgan during the gold rush to reduce the length of the trip to Denver. Fort Morgan and Fort Sedgwick were established in the mid-1860s as a defensive measure against the threat of attack by Native Americans. Fort Sedgwick was built on the south side of the South Platte River and one mile west of Julesburg.

A number of Cheyenne north of Denver on the South Platte Trail were killed by soldiers of the First Colorado Cavalry in the spring of 1864. Julesburg was attacked on January 7, 1865 by about 1,000 Cheyenne and Sioux men in retribution for the Sand Creek massacre (November 29, 1864). At Fort Sedgwick, several Native Americans and some soldiers were killed, and there was so much food looted from Julesburg that it took three days to remove it to their village at Cherry Creek or Sand Creek. After that, three groups of Native Americans, the Arapaho, Cheyenne, and Sioux, engaged in an attack on stage stations and ranches along the South Platte Trail over a period of six days. They killed more people than were killed at the Sand Creek Massacre, burned building, tore down telegraph lines, and looted horses, 2000 cattle, and wagon trains, one of which had 22 wagons. There were further attacks in 1865 between Julesburg and Fort Morgan, including burning down the town of Julesburg in February. The town was rebuilt.

A group of 120 men of the newly formed Colorado militia was tasked with guarding the trail beginning about 1865. In 1866, George Armstrong Custer drove the 7th Cavalry Regiment to South Platte. There were other conflicts near the South Platte Trail in the later 1860s.
