= Merino, Colorado =

Town in Colorado, United States

Town of Merino, Colorado
- Statutory Town
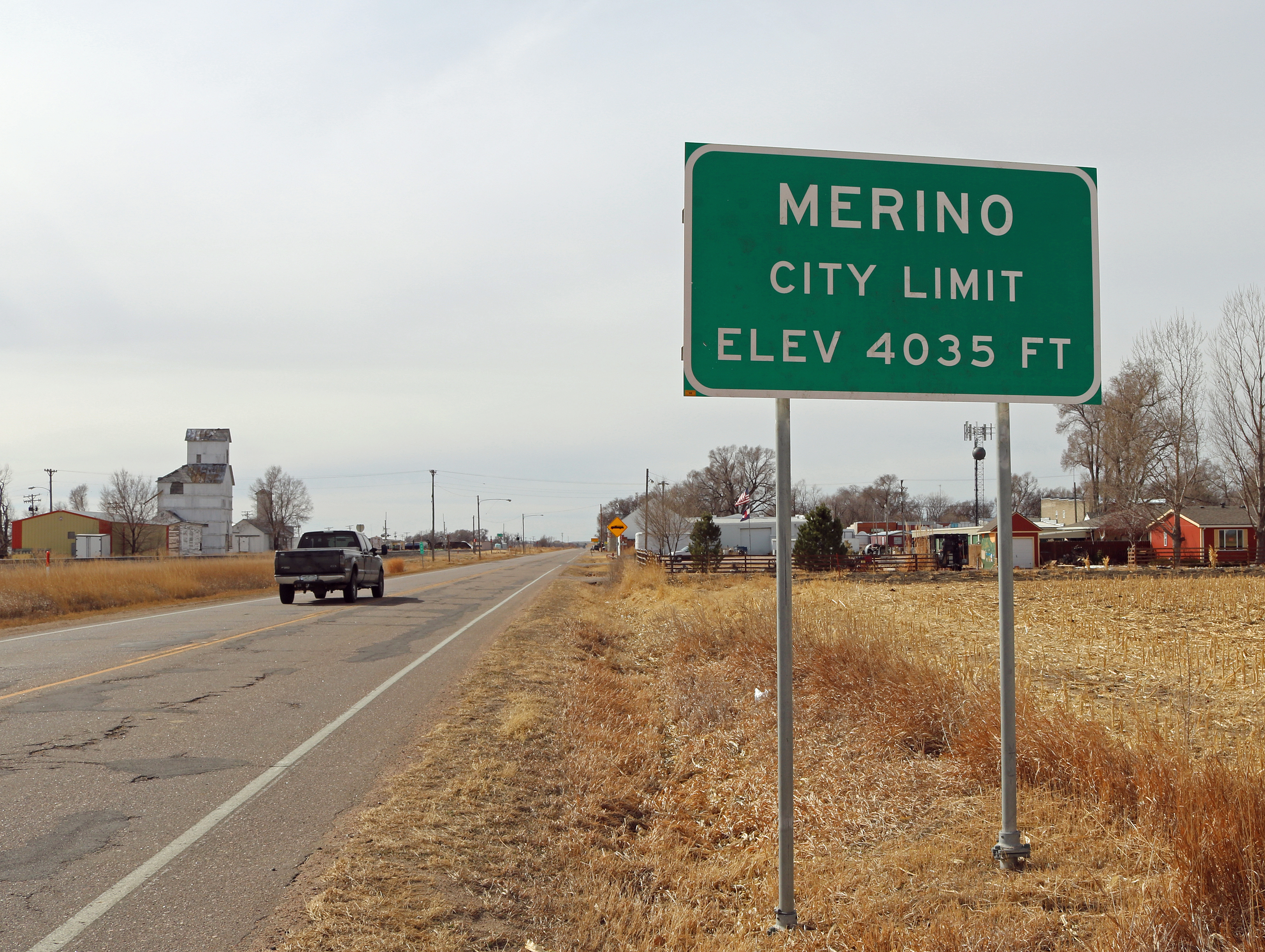
- Platte Street in Merino.

- Location of Merino in Logan County, Colorado.
- Coordinates: 40°29′01″N 103°21′13″W
- Country: United States
- State: Colorado
- County: Logan
- Incorporated (town): January 4, 1917

Government
  - Type: Statutory Town

Area
  - Total: 0.15 sq mi (0.39 km^{2})
  - Land: 0.15 sq mi (0.39 km^{2})
  - Water: 0 sq mi (0.00 km^{2})
- Elevation: 4,039 ft (1,231 m)

Population (2020)
  - Total: 281
  - Density: 1,900/sq mi (720/km^{2})
- Time zone: UTC-7 (Mountain (MST))
  - Summer (DST): UTC-6 (MDT)
- ZIP code: 80741
- Area code: 970
- FIPS code: 08-50040
- GNIS feature ID: 2412985
- Website: townofmerino.colorado.gov

The Town of Merino is a Statutory Town in Logan County, Colorado, United States. The town population was 281 at the 2020 United States census.

The town was named for the merino sheep which grazed there.

== Geography ==
According to the United States Census Bureau, the town has a total area of 0.152 square miles (0.39 km^{2}), all of it land.

=== Climate ===
According to the Köppen Climate Classification system, Merino has a semi-arid climate, abbreviated "BSk" on climate maps.

== Demographics ==
Historical population
Census	Pop.	Note	%±
1920	263		—
1930	230		−12.5%
1940	259		12.6%
1950	209		−19.3%
1960	268		28.2%
1970	260		−3.0%
1980	255		−1.9%
1990	238		−6.7%
2000	246		3.4%
2010	284		15.4%
2020	281		−1.1%
U.S. Decennial Census

== Notable people ==
Radio and television host Ralph Edwards was born in Merino. Ralph Edwards Avenue was named in his memory.

== See also ==
- Sterling, CO Micropolitan Statistical Area
