= Colorado War =

19th-century armed conflict of the American Indian Wars

- Part of the American Indian Wars, Sioux Wars, and American Civil War
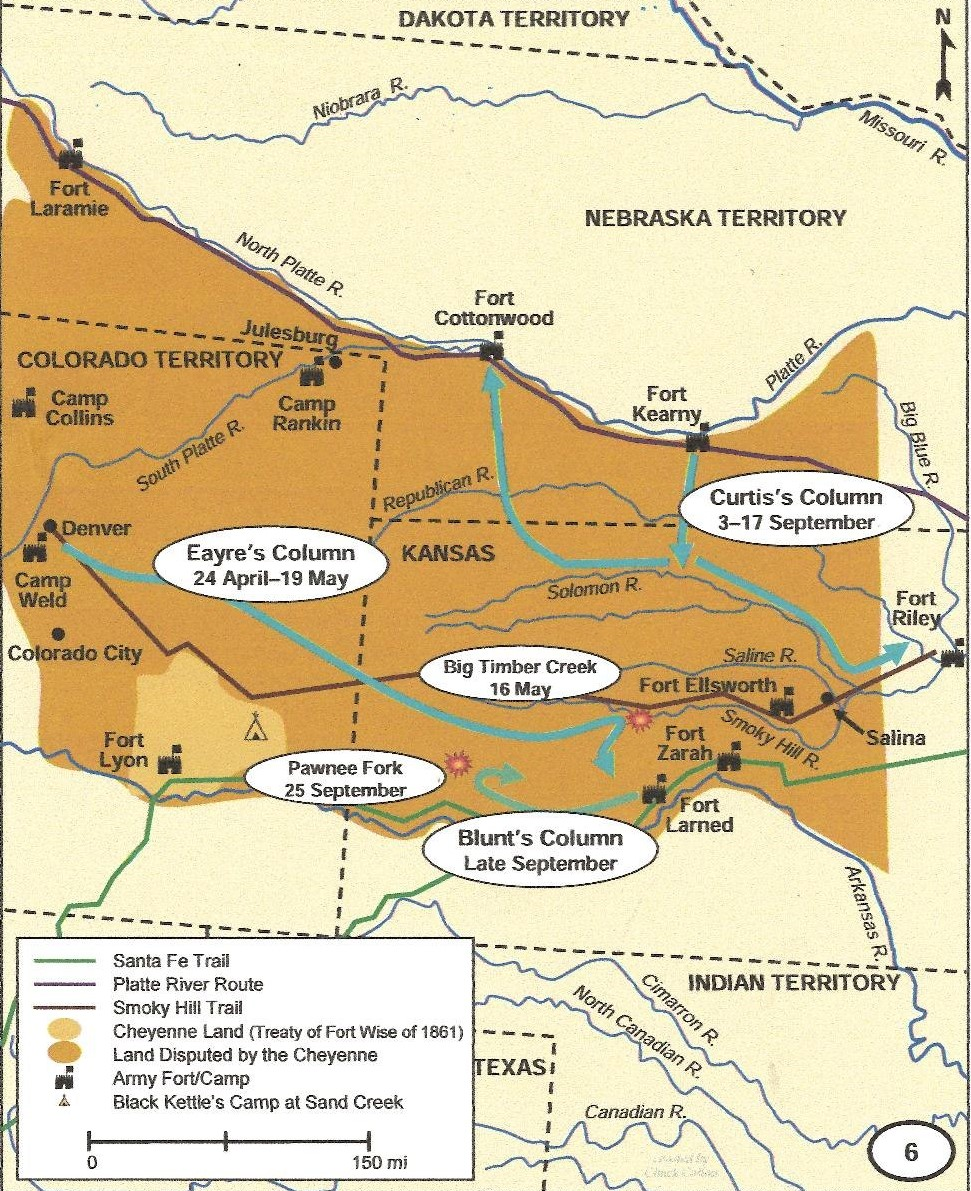
- Map of the Colorado War
Date	April 12, 1864 – July 26, 1865
Location	Colorado, Kansas, Wyoming, Nebraska
Result	Inconclusive

Belligerents
United States	Cheyenne; Arapaho; Lakota Sioux

Commanders and leaders
(United States) John M. Chivington; William O. Collins	Black Kettle; Roman Nose; Spotted Tail; Pawnee Killer

The Colorado War was an Indian War fought in 1864 and 1865 between the Southern Cheyenne, Arapaho, and allied Brulé and Oglala Lakota (or Sioux) peoples versus the U.S. Army, the Colorado militia, and white settlers in Colorado Territory and adjacent regions. The Kiowa and the Comanche played a minor role in actions that occurred in the southern part of the Territory along the Arkansas River. The Cheyenne, Arapaho, and Lakota Sioux played the major role in actions that occurred north of the Arkansas River and along the South Platte River, the Great Platte River Road, and the eastern portion of the Overland Trail. The United States government and Colorado Territory authorities participated through the 1st Colorado Cavalry Regiment, often called the Colorado volunteers. The war was centered on the Colorado Eastern Plains, extending eastward into Kansas and Nebraska.

The war included an attack in November 1864 against the winter camp of the Southern Cheyenne Chief Black Kettle known as the Sand Creek massacre. The engagement, initially hailed as a great victory, was later publicly condemned as an act of genocidal brutality. The massacre resulted in military and congressional hearings which established the culpability of John M. Chivington, the commander of the Colorado Volunteers, and his troops.

The Indians' response to the Sand Creek Massacre was a move northward to the more isolated lands of Wyoming to join their relatives, the Northern Cheyenne, the Northern Arapaho, and the main body of the Lakota Sioux. En route they carried out extensive raids along the South Platte River and attacked U.S. military forts and forces, successfully eluding defeat and capture by the U.S. army.

== Background ==
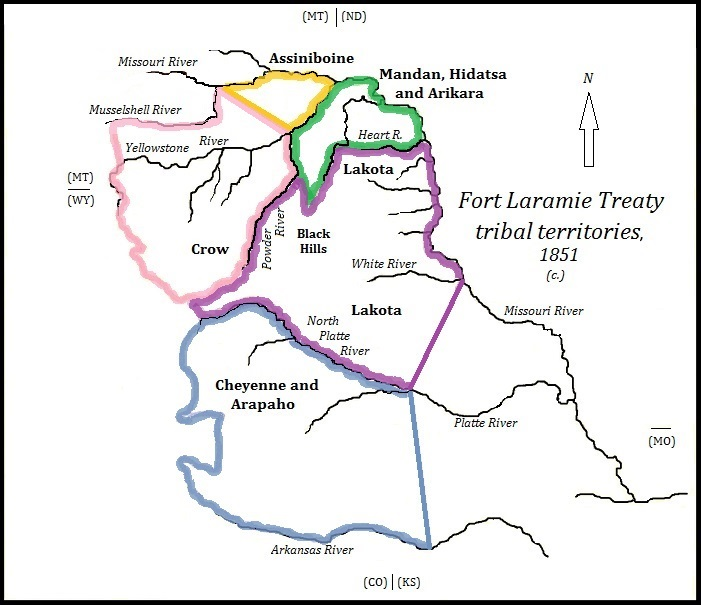
Indian land as defined by the Treaty of Fort Laramie

By the terms of the 1851 Treaty of Fort Laramie between the United States and a few representatives of various tribes including the Cheyenne and Arapaho, the United States unilaterally defined and recognized Cheyenne and Arapaho territory as ranging from the North Platte River in present-day Wyoming and Nebraska southward to the Arkansas River in present-day Colorado and Kansas. The treaty also acknowledged that the tribal territories defined therein were minimum territories and that it didn't preclude the existence of additional tribal territories not mentioned in the treaty. The treaty did not – as is often falsely assumed – "allocate territory" to various tribes but endeavoured to make declaratory delineations of already existing sovereign tribal lands through which the US merely secured a right of way. Initially, the land, often called "the Great American Desert," was of little interest to the United States and white settlers. However, the discovery in November 1858 of gold in the Rocky Mountains in Colorado (then part of the western Kansas Territory) brought on a gold rush and a consequent flood of white emigration across Cheyenne and Arapaho lands. Colorado territorial officials pressured federal authorities to redefine and reduce the extent of Indian treaty lands.

On February 18, 1861, six chiefs of the Southern Cheyenne and four of the Arapaho signed the Treaty of Fort Wise with the United States at Bent's New Fort at Big Timbers near what is now Lamar, Colorado. They ceded more than 90 percent of the lands designated for them by the Fort Laramie Treaty. Their new, much reduced reserve was located in eastern Colorado. Some Cheyenne including the Dog Soldiers, a militaristic band of Cheyennes and Lakotas that had evolved beginning in the 1830s, disavowed the treaty and refused to abide by its constraints. They continued to live and hunt in the bison-rich lands of eastern Colorado and western Kansas, becoming increasingly belligerent over the tide of white immigration across their lands. Cheyennes opposed to the treaty said that it had been signed by a small minority of the chiefs without the consent or approval of the rest of the tribe, that the signatories had not understood what they signed, and that they had been bribed to sign by a large distribution of gifts. The settlers, however, claimed the treaty was a "solemn obligation" and considered that those Indians who refused to abide by it were hostile and planning a war.

== Opening shots ==
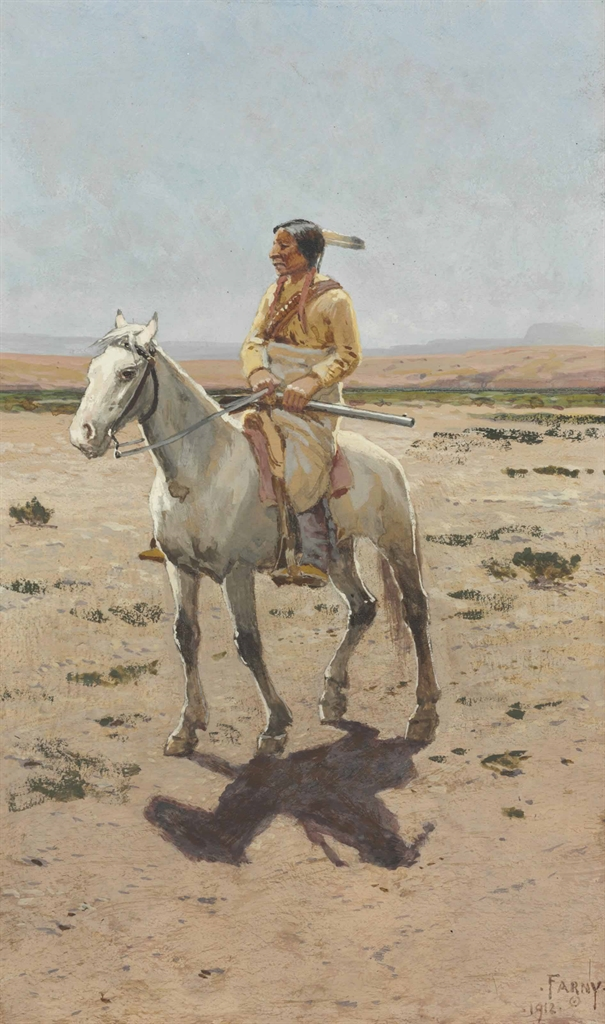
Painting of a Cheyenne scout

In early 1864, territorial officials and military leaders in Colorado still expected a degree of stability on the Plains, despite rising tensions with Cheyenne and Arapaho communities. On April 9, however, Colonel John Chivington, commander of the Colorado volunteers, reported that Indians had stolen 175 head of cattle from whites. The Cheyenne later stated that they found cattle wandering freely on the plains and took them to their camps. Lt. George Eayre with soldiers and a howitzer was despatched to recover the cattle. On April 12, Eayre encountered a band of Cheyenne. A fight ensued in which a soldier was killed. Eayre burned the seventy tipis of a nearby encampment and returned to Denver with 20 head of cattle. This fight took place near the headwaters of the Republican River.

Around the same time, a band of fourteen Cheyenne Dog Soldiers encountered a group of fifteen to twenty U.S. soldiers just north of the South Platte River. The soldiers demanded that the Dog Soldiers lay down their weapons, suspecting them of having stolen four mules from a white settler. A fight ensued, resulting in the deaths of two soldiers and wounding three Dog Soldiers. The mixed blood Cheyenne warrior, George Bent, said that the Indians were puzzled by what they regarded as unprovoked attacks by soldiers. Bent speculated that the altercations between soldiers and Indians were an effort by Colonel Chivington and the Colorado Volunteers to avoid being ordered to go to Kansas to fight the Confederates by establishing a need for them to remain in Colorado because of an Indian war.

== The war expands ==
Skirmishes continued to occur, sparked by both the Indians and U.S. soldiers and militia. In May 1864, Lt. Eayre was in the field again with 100 men and 2 howitzers. Near the Smoky Hill River in Kansas, Eayre had a battle with the Dog Soldiers. He claimed the Indians started the battle; the Indians claimed the soldiers attacked them. Eayre claimed that he killed 28 Indians at a loss of four men of his own. Bent claimed that only three Indians were killed, but among the Indian dead was Lean Bear, a prominent Dog Soldier leader. Eayre finished his raid at Fort Larned, near present Larned, Kansas, where 240 of his horses and mules were stolen by the Kiowa. Arapahoes offering assistance to recover the stolen horses were fired on by soldiers and thereafter turned hostile.

Also, in May, Major Jacob Downing and a force of Colorado volunteers attacked a Cheyenne village in Cedar Canyon north of the South Platte River. The people in the village were mainly old women and children. Downing reported killing 26 Indians. One soldier was killed.

The Hungate massacre involved the murder of the family of Nathan Hungate along Running Creek (Box Elder Creek near present-day Elizabeth, Colorado) on June 11, 1864. It was a precipitating factor leading to the Sand Creek massacre of November 29, 1864.

On July 12, a band of Miniconjou Sioux attacked a wagon train on the Oregon Trail, killing 4 men. Soldiers pursued the raiders but were ambushed and had one man killed. On August 20, the Indians killed 5 members of a family in Nebraska. A total of 51 people were reported killed by Indians along the Little Blue River in Kansas and Nebraska. The roads to Denver across the Great Plains were closed from August 15 to September 24.

Soldiers from Kansas also got involved in the war. On September 25, Major General James G. Blunt with 400 soldiers and Delaware Indian scouts encountered Cheyennes on the Pawnee Fork of the Arkansas River. Blunt claimed to have killed 9 Indians at the cost of two dead soldiers.

== Peace feelers ==
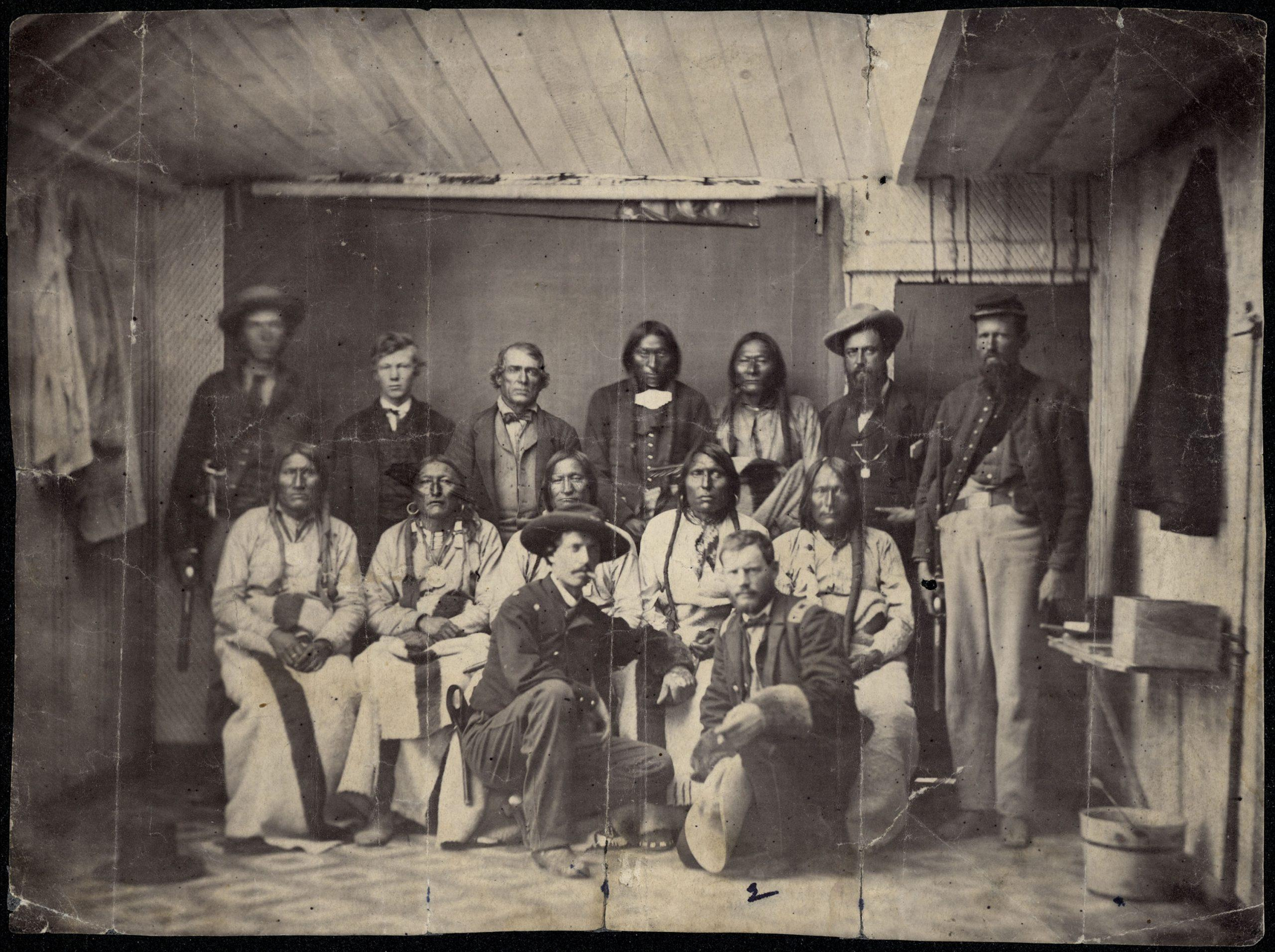
The Camp Weld Conference, September 28, 1864, with the Cheyenne and Arapaho. Major Wynkoop is kneeling left. Black Kettle is third from the left in the middle row.

In July 1864, Colorado governor John Evans sent a circular to the Plains Indians, inviting those who were friendly to go to a place of safety at Fort Lyon (near present Lamar, Colorado) on the eastern plains, where their people would be given provisions and protection by the United States troops. A substantial number of the Indians desired peace, while the Dog Soldiers pursued war. On August 29, 1864, the two mixed-blood Cheyennes, George Bent and Edmund Guerrier, wrote letters on behalf of "Black Kettle and Other Chiefs" offering to make peace and return seven white prisoners in exchange for Indian prisoners held by the whites. In response, Major Edward W. Wynkoop, the commander of Fort Lyon led a force of 130 men to try to recover the prisoners. They were met by a band of 600 or more Cheyenne warriors on the Smoky Hill River. In talks with Black Kettle and others, Wynkoop invited the chiefs to visit Denver to meet with the governor, John Evans, and Colonel Chivington. The meetings at Camp Weld ended with Black Kettle and the other chiefs apparently believing that they had made peace with the whites.

On their return to Fort Lyon, Wynkoop promised the peaceful Indians protection if they established a village on Sand Creek, 60 kilometres (37 miles) northeast of Fort Lyon, and within the area allocated to the Cheyenne and Arapaho by the Treaty of Fort Wise. Black Kettle and his followers moved to Sand Creek. On October 17, however, Wynkoop was relieved of his command by Chivington, apparently because of his advocacy for a peaceful settlement of the war.

Despite efforts by chiefs such as Black Kettle to maintain peace, the Dog Soldiers and other bands continued to raid ranches, stage attacks on wagon trains, and clash with U.S. Army forces throughout the fall of 1864, particularly in the territories of Kansas and Nebraska. The U.S. Army launched several expeditions to suppress these attacks, but many were poorly coordinated, lightly manned, or strategically ineffective, even failing to prevent further violence.

== Sand Creek massacre ==
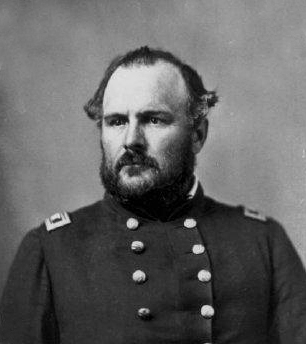
Colonel John M. Chivington

Damn any man who sympathizes with Indians! ... I have come to kill Indians, and believe it is right and honorable to use any means under God's heaven to kill Indians. ... Kill and scalp all, big and little; nits make lice.

— Colonel John Chivington

On November 29, 1864, 675 men, mostly members of the Colorado Volunteers under the command of Colonel John M. Chivington, crossed into Cheyenne and Arapaho territory, in lands designated to them by the Treaty of Fort Wise. The soldiers attacked the village of Black Kettle, where both an American flag and a white flag of truce were flying, killing approximately 150 Indigenous people, the majority of whom were unarmed women, children, and the elderly. There were no Dog Soldiers nor other hostile Indians in the village at the time of Chivington's attack.

== Indian retaliation ==
At night the whole [South Platte River] valley was lighted up with the flames of burning ranches and stage stations, but the places were soon all destroyed and darkness fell on the valley."

— George Bent

The plains, from Julesburg west, for more than one hundred miles, are red with the blood of murdered men, women, and children – ranches are in ashes – stock all driven off – the country utterly desolate.

— Nebraska Republican

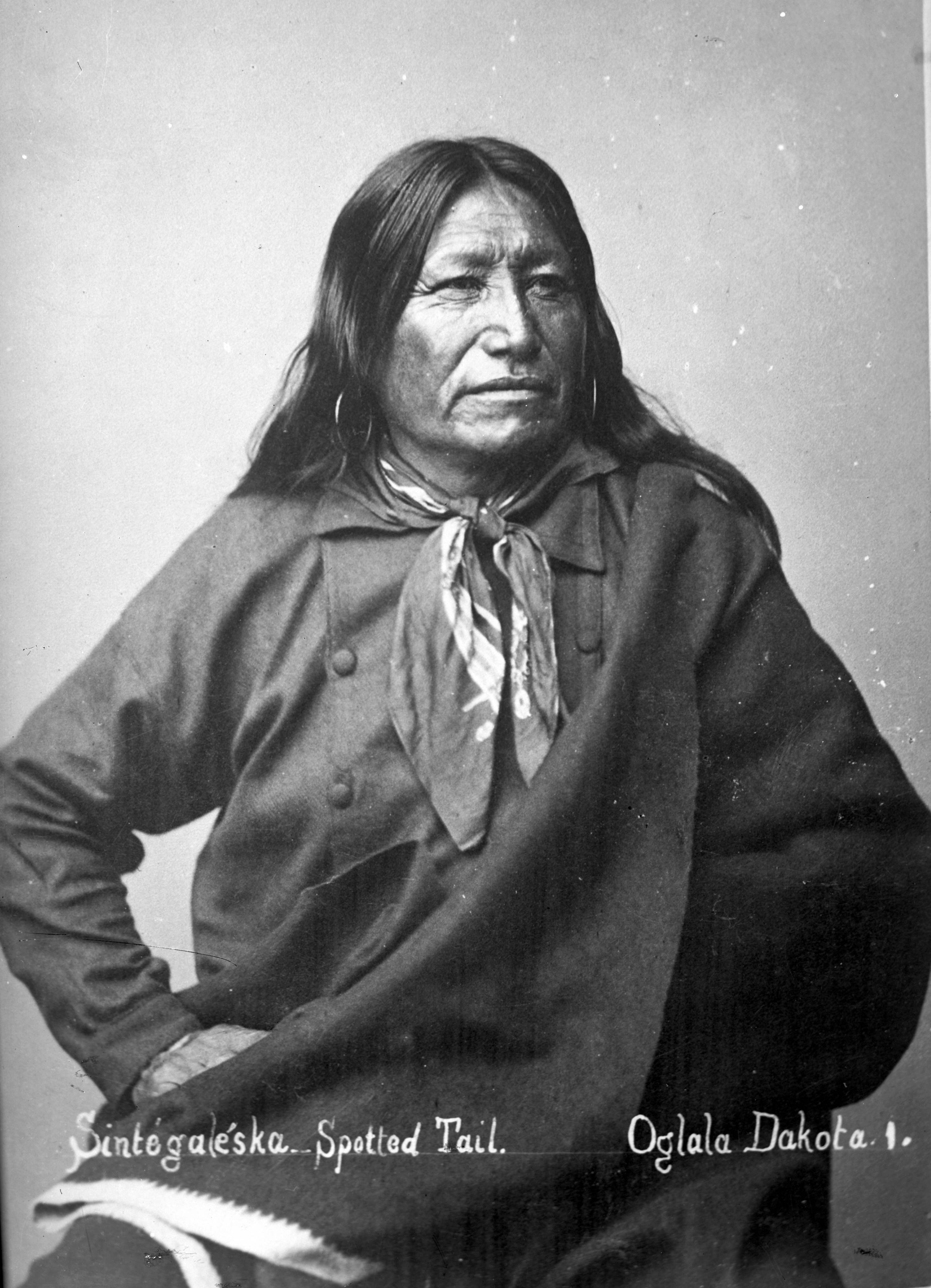
Spotted Tail, the Brulé Sioux leader

After the Sand Creek massacre, according to George Bent, the Cheyenne, Northern Arapaho, and the Brulé and Oglala sub-tribes of the Lakota met about January 1, 1865 on Cherry Creek in present-day Cheyenne County, Kansas. They agreed on war with the whites and decided to attack Camp Rankin and the nearby settlement of Julesburg, Colorado. The Sioux, the first to agree to war, had the honor of leading a column of possibly 1,000 warriors and an additional 3,000 women and children. After the attack on Julesburg, the Indians planned to march northward and join their relatives in Wyoming.

Julesburg consisted of a stagecoach station, stables, an express and telegraph office, a warehouse, and a large store that catered to travelers going to Denver along the South Platte. Its population was about 50 armed men. One mile west was Camp Rankin, with one company, about 60 men, of cavalry. High sod walls surrounded both settlements. On January 7, 1,000 warriors attacked Julesburg and Camp Rankin killing 14 soldiers and four armed civilians at little or no loss to themselves. The surviving soldiers and civilians took refuge inside Camp Rankin while the Indians plundered the settlement.

Not all the Indians were committed to war. After the raid, Black Kettle and 80 lodges of his followers (perhaps 100 men and their families) left the main body and joined the Kiowa and Comanche south of the Arkansas River. Many of the Southern Arapaho likewise had moved south of the Arkansas. Towards the end of January, several ranches and farms belonging to white settlers were attacked and raided upon, mainly the American Ranch, Godfrey Ranch, Wisconsin Ranch, Gittrell Ranch and many others, resulting in an additional small number of casualties.

From January 28 to February 2, the Indians embarked on a great raid along the valley of the South Platte River. The Cheyenne raided west of Julesburg, the Northern Arapaho near Julesburg, and the Sioux east of Julesburg, destroying a dozen or more ranches and stagecoach stations along 150 kilometres (93 miles) of the river valley and accumulating a large herd of captured cattle. Near Valley Station (present day Sterling, Colorado), the Cheyenne had a brush with soldiers. Illustrating the difference in accounts between soldiers and Indians, Lt. J. J. Kennedy said that his force had a battle with the raiders and killed 10 to 20 Indians and recovered 400 stolen cattle. George Bent said it was a minor skirmish in which no Indians were killed or wounded and the only cattle the soldiers recovered were the ones the Indians had abandoned as too poor to steal. During the raid, the Cheyenne encountered a group of nine former soldiers. They killed all nine of them and discovered two Cheyenne scalps in their luggage from the Sand Creek massacre. Although soldiers and ranchers claimed to have inflicted heavy casualties on the raiders, Bent said he knew of only four Indians who were killed during the raids. Three were Sioux who were killed while attacking a wagon train and one was an Arapaho who was killed accidentally by a Cheyenne.

On February 2, the Indians left their large camp on the South Platte River and continued north toward the Powder River country of Wyoming to join their relatives there. The Sioux led the way as they were most familiar with the territory. En route the Indians had two more skirmishes in Nebraska with the U.S. army at Mud Springs and Rush Creek. In subsequent months, the Indians frequently raided wagon trains and military establishments along the Oregon Trail in Wyoming. In the summer of 1865, the Indians launched a large-scale offensive in the Battle of Platte Bridge (present-day Casper, Wyoming) achieving a minor victory. Later that summer, the U.S. army invaded Indian territory in Wyoming with more than 2,000 soldiers in the ineffective Powder River Expedition.

== Aftermath ==
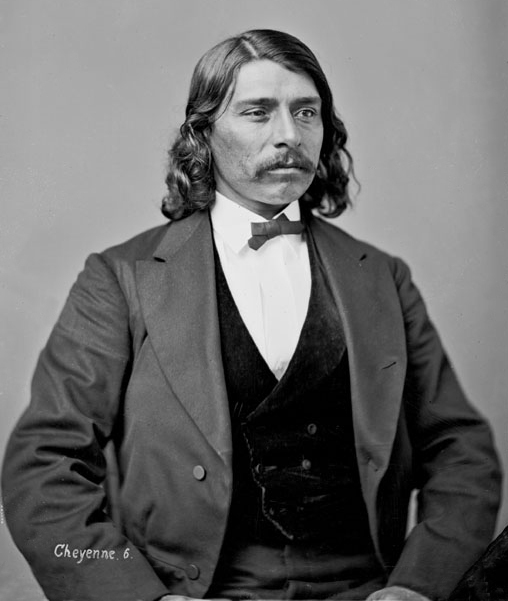
Edmond Guerrier was the son of Frenchman William Guerrier and Walks In Sight, a Cheyenne. A survivor of the Sand Creek massacre, Guerrier testified to Congressional investigators at Fort Riley, Kansas in 1865 about the massacre.

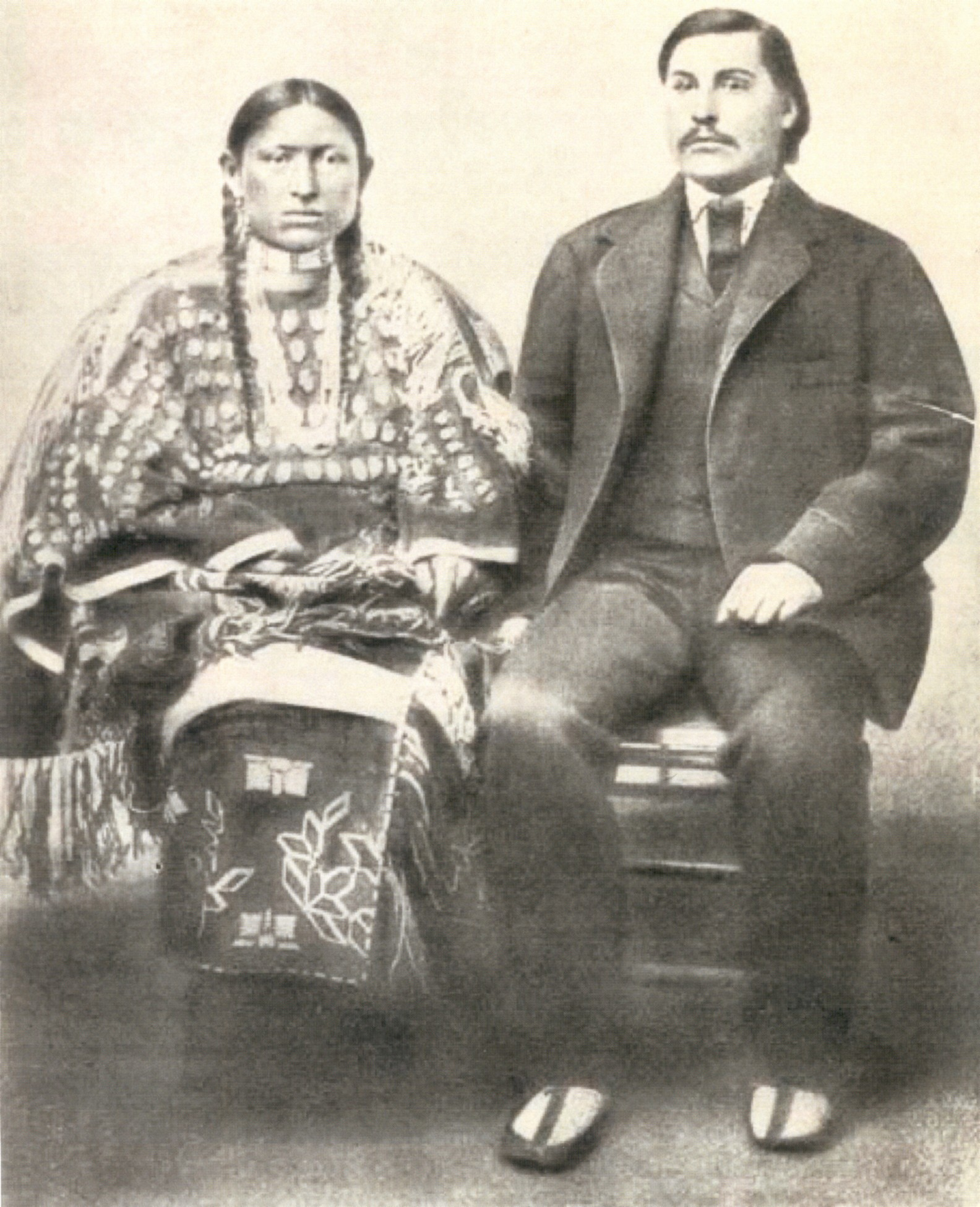
Mixed blood Cheyenne warrior George Bent and his wife, Magpie. Bent was a survivor of the Sand Creek massacre.

Historian John D. McDermott said that the Colorado War was the last time the Northern and Southern Cheyennes and Arapahos and the Brulé Sioux were united to effectively resist the tide of white settlers and soldiers traveling through and settling on what had formerly been their lands. "Never again would the Sioux and their allies take the offensive as they did at Julesburg, Mud Springs, Rush Springs," and other battles of the Colorado War. Thereafter, the battles between Indians and whites "would become more reactive, rather than active, meant to defend a homeland rather than punish a perpetrator" as the Indian reaction to the Sand Creek massacre was intended to be.

By December 1865, the Colorado War had fizzled out. Most of the Southern Cheyenne and Arapaho who had journeyed north to Wyoming had returned to the southern Great Plains. The Brulé Sioux under Spotted Tail who had been allies of the Cheyenne and Arapaho had peacefully settled near Fort Laramie. Black Kettle, always seeking peace, signed the Little Arkansas Treaty in October 1865 obligating his band of Southern Cheyenne to move to Indian Territory (present-day Oklahoma). Roman Nose and the Dog Soldiers continued to be hostile and to raid and fight the U.S. army in Kansas and Colorado.

The two mixed-blood Cheyennes, George Bent and Edmund Guerrier, also returned to the southern plains. Bent became an interpreter between the Cheyenne and the whites and, through a series of letters to scholar George Hyde, a historian of the Colorado War and the Cheyenne. Guerrier worked for a time as a scout for George Armstrong Custer in campaigns against his Cheyenne relatives and as an interpreter for many interactions between the tribe and the United States. Guerrier married Julia Bent, sister of George Bent and also a survivor of the Sand Creek massacre.

== Investigations of Sand Creek massacre ==
In 1865, the Joint Committee on the Conduct of the War investigated the Sand Creek massacre and concluded the following: "the truth is that he [Col. Chivington] surprised and murdered, in cold blood, the unsuspecting men, women, and children on Sand creek, who had every reason to believe they were under the protection of the United States authorities, and then returned to Denver and boasted of the brave deed he and the men under his command had performed."

Another congressional committee, the Joint Special Committee on Conditions of Indian Tribes, also investigated the Sand Creek massacre in 1865 as part of a larger review of U.S.-Native American affairs across the country and territories. Of the five conclusions outlined in their report, the first linked the ongoing conflicts with Indigenous Peoples directly to the actions of "lawless white men." A group of legislators from the committee visited Fort Lyon in 1865 and told tribe members there that the government disapproved of Chivington's actions.

Chivington had already resigned his military commission and thus was not prosecuted for the massacre. After Sand Creek, Chivington changed residences frequently and was involved in several scandals. He defended his actions at Sand Creek until the end of his life in 1894. The Methodist Church, of which he was a lay preacher, apologized for his actions in 1996 and a street named after him in Longmont, Colorado was renamed in 2005.

== See also ==
- Red Cloud's War
- Colorado in the American Civil War
- Battle of Julesburg
- Battle of Mud Springs
- Battle of Rush Creek
- Battle of Platte Bridge
- Powder River Expedition
- Battle of the Tongue River
- Raid on Godfrey Ranch
- Sawyers Fight
