= Rogers =

Rogers may refer to:

== Places ==
=== Canada ===
- Rogers Pass (British Columbia)
- Rogers Island (Nunavut)

=== United States ===
- Rogers, Arkansas, a city
- Rogers, alternate name of Muroc, California, a former settlement
- Rogers, Connecticut, a village in the town of Killingly
- Rogers, Kansas, an unincorporated community
- Rogers, Kentucky, an unincorporated community
- Rogers, Minnesota, a city
- Rogers, Nebraska, a village
- Rogers, New Mexico, an unincorporated community
- Rogers, North Dakota, a city
- Rogers, Ohio, a village
- Rogers, Texas, a town
- Rogers, Virginia, an unincorporated community
- Petroleum, West Virginia, also known as Rogers, an unincorporated community
- Rogers Brook, Pennsylvania
- Rogers City, Michigan, a city
- Rogers Corner, Michigan, an unincorporated community
- Rogers County, Oklahoma
- Rogers Creek (Missouri)
- Rogers Creek (Pennsylvania)
- Rogers Island (Connecticut)
- Rogers Island (New York)
- Rogers Lake (disambiguation)
- Rogers Pass (Colorado)
- Rogers Pass (Montana)
- Rogers Peak (California)
- Mount Rogers (Virginia)
- Rogers Township (disambiguation)

=== Elsewhere ===
- Mount Rogers (Australian Capital Territory), Australia

== Companies ==
- Rogers Communications, a Canadian media corporation
  - Rogers Bank, a financial services company
  - Rogers Cable, cable provider
  - Rogers Hi-Speed Internet, Canadian internet service provider
  - Rogers Home Phone, Canadian telephone service provider
  - Rogers Media, media, print and publisher
  - Rogers Personal TV, Canadian television service provider
  - Rogers Radio
  - Rogers Sportsnet, Canadian sports channel
  - Rogers Telecom, integrated communications provider
  - Rogers Wireless, Canadian mobile phone service provider
- Rogers Corporation, an American manufacturer of specialty materials such as laminates
- Rogers Drums, a drum manufacturer
- Rogers Group, a Mauritius-based conglomerate
- Rogers International, the British brand name for the Chinese audio electronics manufacturer Wo Kee Hong Holdings Ltd
- Rogers Locomotive and Machine Works, a major steam locomotive manufacturing company in the 19th century
- Rogers Sugar, a Canadian income trust that includes sugar refining company Rogers Sugar Ltd.
- Rogers Vacuum Tube Company

== People ==
- Rogers (surname)
- Rogers (given name)

== Schools ==
- Rogers State University, Claremore, Oklahoma
- Rogers High School (disambiguation)
- Rogers Middle School for the Creative and Performing Arts, Pittsburgh, Pennsylvania

== Sports facilities ==
- Rogers Arena, an arena in Vancouver, British Columbia, Canada
- Rogers Centre, a sports stadium in Toronto, Canada, formerly called "SkyDome"
- Rogers Place, an arena in Edmonton, Alberta, Canada

== Other uses ==
- USS Rogers, two ships
- Rogers Airfield, a former World War II airfield in Papua New Guinea
- Rogers baronets, an extinct title in the Baronetage of England
- Rogers Theater, a movie theater in Rogers City, Michigan listed on the National Register of Historic Places

== See also ==
- Rodgers
- Justice Rogers (disambiguation)
