= Rogers Pass =

Rogers Pass may refer to:

- Rogers Pass (British Columbia)
- Rogers Pass (Montana)
- Rogers Pass (Colorado), part of James Peak Wilderness Area

== See also ==
- Rogers (disambiguation)
- List of mountain passes
