= Superior, Colorado =

Town in Colorado, United States

- Town
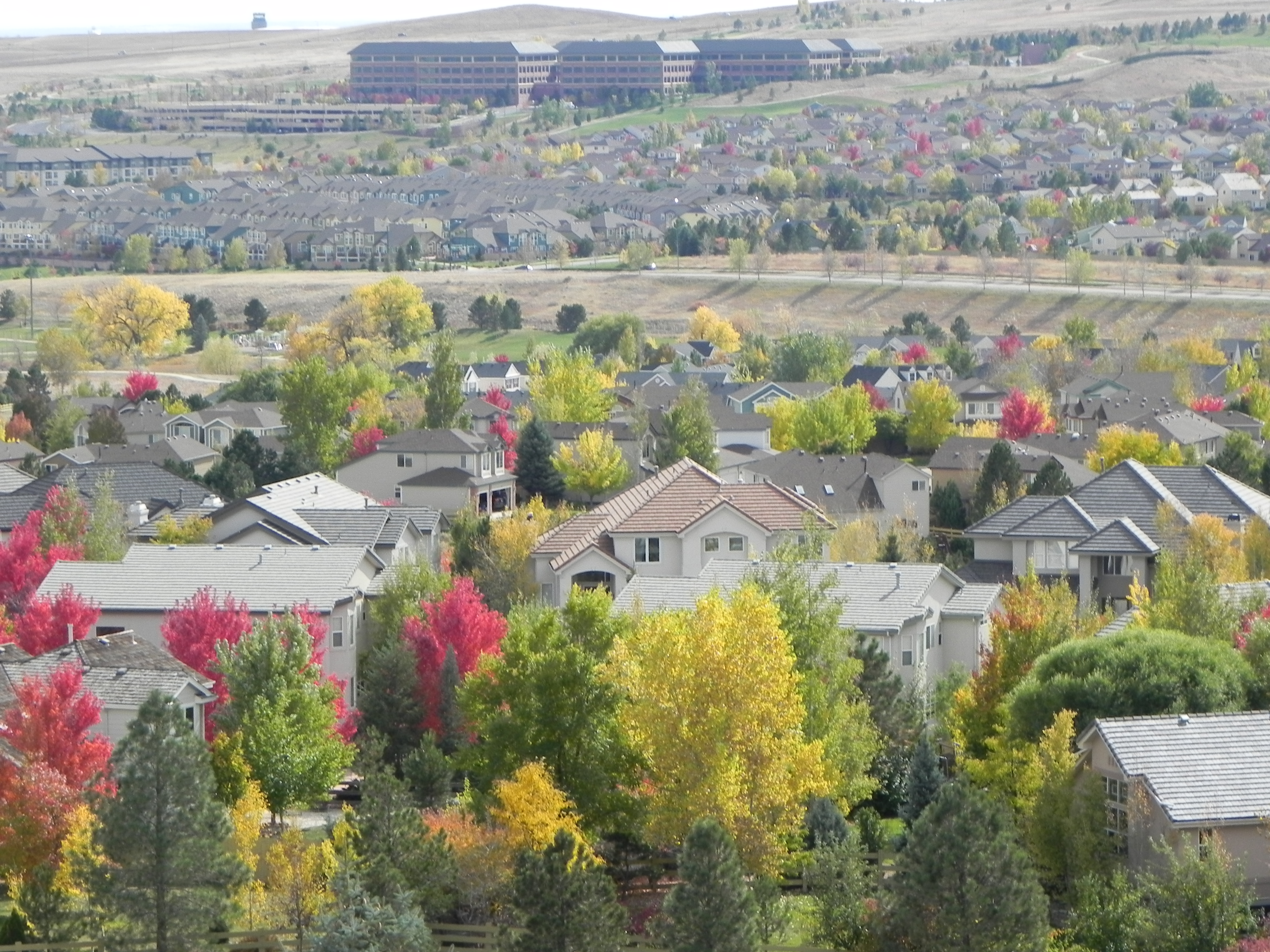
- Rock Creek Ranch subdivision in Superior

- Flag

- Location of Superior in Boulder County and Jefferson County, Colorado
- Coordinates: 39°56′02″N 105°09′32″W
- Country: United States
- State: Colorado
- Counties: Boulder County, Jefferson County
- Founded: 1896
- Incorporated: June 10, 1904

Government
  - Type: Home Rule Municipality
  - Mayor: Mark Lacis

Area
  - Total: 3.97 sq mi (10.27 km^{2})
  - Land: 3.93 sq mi (10.17 km^{2})
  - Water: 0.039 sq mi (0.10 km^{2})
- Elevation: 5,522 ft (1,683 m)

Population (2020)
  - Total: 13,094
  - Density: 3,335/sq mi (1,288/km^{2})
- Time zone: UTC−7 (MST)
  - Summer (DST): UTC−6 (MDT)
- ZIP code: 80027
- Area codes: Both 303 and 720
- FIPS code: 08-75640
- GNIS feature ID: 2413354
- Highways: US 36, SH 128, SH 170
- Website: Town Website

Superior is a Home Rule Town in Boulder County, Colorado, United States, with a small, uninhabited segment of land area extending into Jefferson County. Superior is a suburban community with a population of 13,361 as of 2024. Located in Colorado's Front Range urban corridor, it is close to the cities of Boulder, Denver, and the foothills of the Front Range mountains.

== History ==
=== Geology ===
Superior is located in Colorado’s Front Range on the western side of the Denver Basin and is a part of the Laramie Formation. The formation is known for its deposits of bituminous and lignite coal, which led to the area’s development as a coal mining hub in the late 1800s. The area became known as the “Northern Field,” covering a 20-mile (32.19 km) radius from the city of Boulder, extending through the present-day counties of Adams, Boulder, Broomfield, Gilpin, Jefferson, Larimer and Weld.

=== Early Peoples ===
The land was originally used by Native American people including the Arapaho and Ute. It was territory of the Southern Arapaho in February 1861, when Colorado Territory and Boulder County were created and the tribe was forced to relocate as part of the Treaty of Fort Wise.

=== Modern History ===
From the perspective of the United States, the area was on the western edge of the Kansas Territory when gold was discovered near Idaho Springs, spawning the Colorado Gold Rush of 1859.

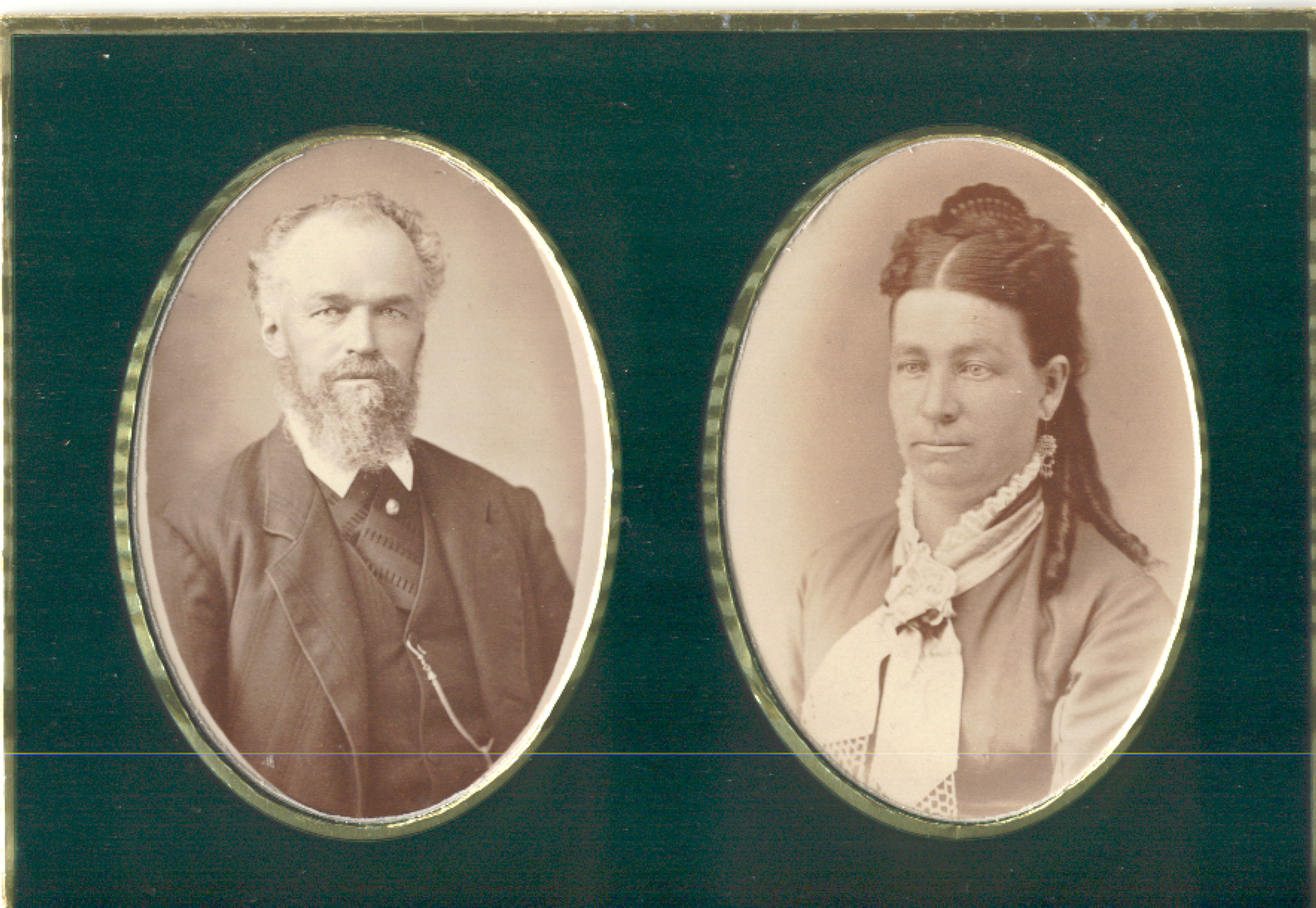
Superior’s founder, William Charles Hake, and his wife, Emeline Hake, circa 1859. Credit: Town of Superior, courtesy of Vera Taylor and Lola Gaudreau, great granddaughters of the Hakes

William C. and Emmaline Hake emigrated from their home in Platteville, Wisconsin as a part of the Colorado gold rush and settled along present-day Coal Creek in 1860. Coal was discovered on the Hake homestead in 1864 after heavy floods exposed a seam along the creek. Hake formalized his ownership of the land in 1870 under the Homestead Acts. He founded the Town of Superior in 1896, and it was formally incorporated in 1904. It was reportedly named after the “superior” quality of coal found in the area, a sub-bituminous grade rather than the lignite predominant in the Northern Field.

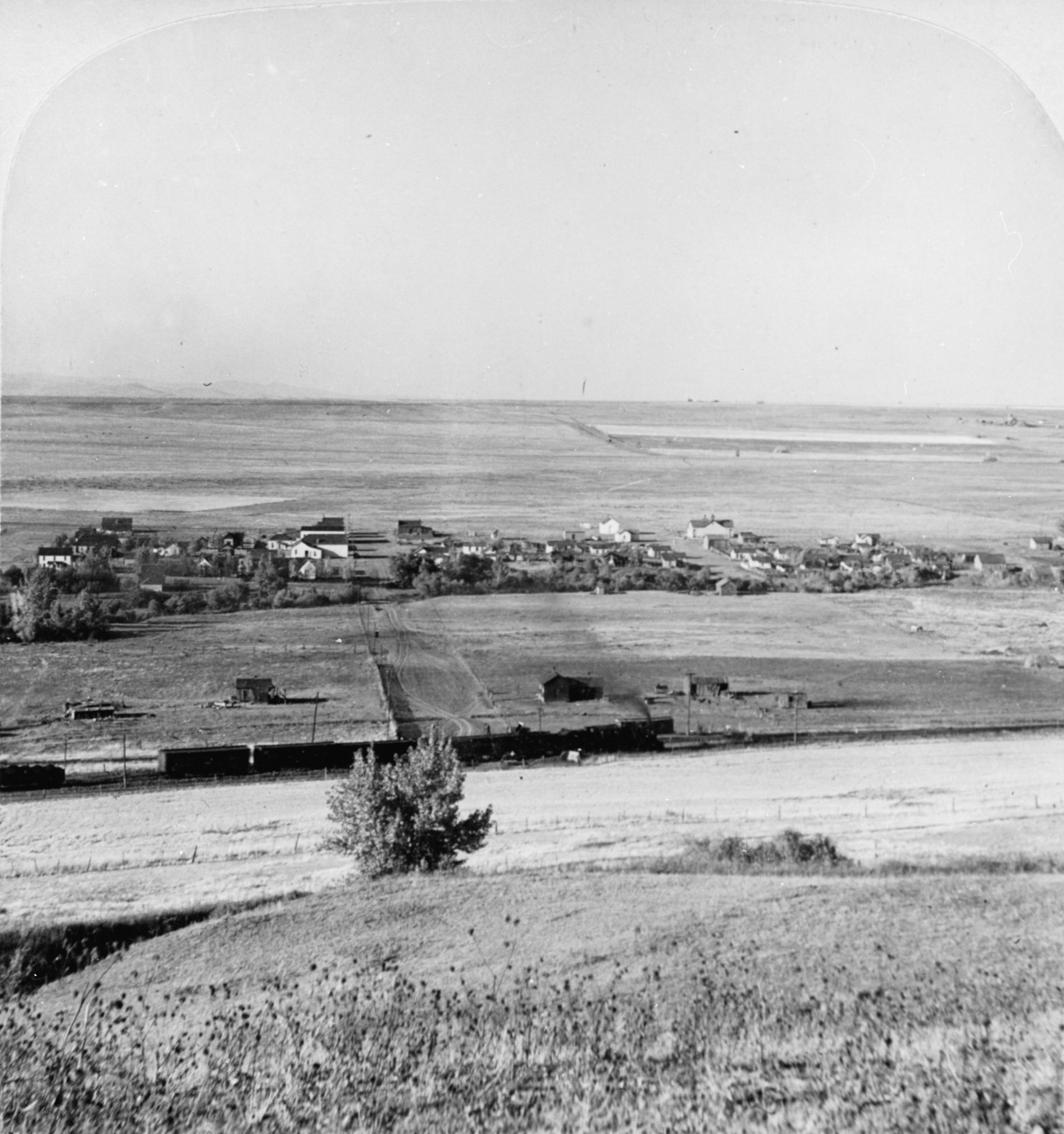
Overlook of Superior, Colorado in 1904. Note the train and tracks in the foreground.

In 1892, Hake contracted with James Hood to build the Industrial Coal Mine just south of Coal Creek and present-day Original Town Superior. The mine was fully operational by 1895. In 1900, the Hakes sold the Industrial Mine to Northern Coal and Coke Company, which was acquired by the Rocky Mountain Fuel Company, which owned the mine from 1911 until it closed in 1945. Northern Coal and Coke and Rocky Mountain Fuel were among the six major coal operators in the Northern Field who signed the first union agreement with the United Mine Workers District 15 in June 1908. The success of the union movement was attributed in part to the self-sufficient socioeconomic base of the Northern Field, which remained largely agrarian even as the mines flourished. Mining was a winter employment and the majority of miners also held small landholdings, which they farmed in summer.

Two local history museums display artifacts from Superior's past. Recollections of members of pioneer families in Superior, including the Hakes and Autreys, are preserved as part of the Maria Rogers Oral History Program at the Carnegie Library for Local History in Boulder, Colorado.

After the Industrial Mine closed in 1945, many residents moved out of the area and Superior evolved into a quiet ranching and farming community. The population hovered around 250 until the 1990s, when Rock Creek Ranch, Sagamore, and other subdivisions were built in the town and the population rose dramatically to 9,011 by 2000. More recently, infill and the Downtown Superior mixed-use development have added additional businesses and residences.

=== Recent events ===
Marshall Fire

On December 30, 2021, the Marshall Fire swept through southwestern Boulder County, destroying 1,084 structures in Louisville, Superior and unincorporated Boulder County. Of these, Superior lost 398 structures - 393 residential, four commercial and one public. In Original Town Superior, only seven of the historic homes survived. The Sagamore subdivision was totally lost. The Marshall Fire was the most destructive wildfire in Colorado history. It forced the evacuation of 37,000 residents, killed two persons and caused $2 billion in damages. It was attributed to downed power lines and a possible secondary source of a licensed burn. High winds and unseasonably dry conditions were contributing factors.

Rocky Mountain Metropolitan Airport

In 1960, the Rocky Mountain Metropolitan Airport ("RMMA") was opened on the northern edge of Jefferson County. At the time, the population of Superior was approximately 175 citizens. Since the first flight from RMMA, the airport has continued to experience annual growth. As a result of a perceived national pilot shortage, numerous flight schools have established their base of operations at the airport. This has led to conflict between Superior and RMMA. As a result, the Town of Superior has filed a lawsuit against the airport. This lawsuit was dismissed on March 28, 2025 by the Boulder County District Court, citing federal preemption. Superior also ignored previous letters sent by Jefferson County, who is the airport sponsor, warning the town that the new developments of Rock Creek and schools were too close to the airport, and that these new homes would experience repeated noise events and vibrations.

Home Rule

On December 10, 2024, Superior held an election adopting a Home Rule Charter.

== Geography ==
Superior is at 39°55′52″N 105°09′33″W (39.93119, −105.159085) with an elevation of 5,522 ft (1,683 m). It is bordered by the city of Louisville to the northeast, the city of Broomfield to the east and south, Rocky Flats National Wildlife Refuge to the south, and Boulder County open space to the west. U.S. Highway 36, also known as the Denver-Boulder Turnpike, runs along the northeast boundary of the town, and Colorado Route 128A runs along the south.

A current land use map of Superior is maintained by the Planning and Building Department.

According to the United States Census Bureau as of 2021, Superior has a total area of 3.972 sq mi (10.29 km^{2}), of which 3.933 sq mi (10.186 km^{2}) is land and 0.039 sq mi (0.101 km^{2}) is water.

== Climate ==
According to the Köppen climate classification system, Superior has Dry, Semi-arid, cold climate (BSk). According to the United States Department of Agriculture, the Plant Hardiness zone is 6a, with an average annual extreme minimum temperature of −10 to −5 °F (−23 to −21 °C).

Climate data for Superior, Colorado. 1991-2020
Month	Jan	Feb	Mar	Apr	May	Jun	Jul	Aug	Sep	Oct	Nov	Dec	Year
Mean daily maximum °F (°C)	46 (8)	47 (8)	55.4 (13.0)	61.3 (16.3)	70 (21)	82.1 (27.8)	88.3 (31.3)	86.1 (30.1)	78.4 (25.8)	65.4 (18.6)	53.8 (12.1)	45.5 (7.5)	64.9 (18.3)
Mean daily minimum °F (°C)	20 (−7)	21 (−6)	28.1 (−2.2)	34.2 (1.2)	43.4 (6.3)	52.8 (11.6)	58.9 (14.9)	56.7 (13.7)	48.8 (9.3)	36.8 (2.7)	27.2 (−2.7)	19.9 (−6.7)	37.3 (2.9)
Average precipitation inches (mm)	0.60 (15)	0.75 (19)	1.59 (40)	2.49 (63)	2.69 (68)	1.67 (42)	1.66 (42)	1.55 (39)	1.64 (42)	1.30 (33)	0.67 (17)	0.67 (17)	17.51 (445)
Source: PRISM Climate Group

== Amenities and Recreation ==
Superior has 788.2 acres (319.0 ha) of parks and open space, which is about 31% of its total land area. This includes owned natural space, natural space under conservation easements, and developed open space. Recreational trails (on-road, hard, and soft) extend for 29.75 mi (47.88 km). Recreational amenities include 13 playgrounds, 6 pickleball courts, 4 tennis courts, 3 multipurpose fields, 3 baseball/softball fields, 2 outdoor pools, 3 basketball courts, 1 skate park, 1 disc golf course, and 2 dog parks.

The Superior Community Center serves as a public venue for diverse uses.

== Demographics ==
Historical population
Census	Pop.	Note	%±
1910	349		—
1920	233		−33.2%
1930	160		−31.3%
1940	205		28.1%
1950	134		−34.6%
1960	173		29.1%
1970	171		−1.2%
1980	208		21.6%
1990	255		22.6%
2000	9,011		3,433.7%
2010	12,483		38.5%
2020	13,094		4.9%
2023 (est.)	13,361	▲	2.0%

As of the 2023 American Community Survey, there were 13,136 people and 4,692 households in Superior. Additional demographic information is available from the US Census profile of Superior and US Census Quick Facts about Superior. Data here are from the 2020 census and 2023 American Community Survey (ACS) 5-year estimates.

=== 2020 census ===
As of the 2020 census, Superior had a population of 13,094. The median age was 36.8 years. 25.5% of residents were under the age of 18 and 7.5% of residents were 65 years of age or older. For every 100 females there were 102.6 males, and for every 100 females age 18 and over there were 101.8 males age 18 and over.

99.9% of residents lived in urban areas, while 0.1% lived in rural areas.

There were 4,805 households in Superior, of which 39.4% had children under the age of 18 living in them. Of all households, 58.5% were married-couple households, 17.2% were households with a male householder and no spouse or partner present, and 17.1% were households with a female householder and no spouse or partner present. About 19.0% of all households were made up of individuals and 4.0% had someone living alone who was 65 years of age or older.

There were 5,025 housing units, of which 4.4% were vacant. The homeowner vacancy rate was 0.9% and the rental vacancy rate was 4.7%. The population density was 3,332 inhabitants per square mile (1,286/km^{2}), and 61.7% of occupied housing units were owner-occupied.

Racial composition as of the 2020 census
Race	Number	Percent
White	9,504	72.6%
Black or African American	142	1.1%
American Indian and Alaska Native	33	0.3%
Asian	1,794	13.7%
Native Hawaiian and Other Pacific Islander	7	0.1%
Some other race	239	1.8%
Two or more races	1,375	10.5%
Hispanic or Latino (of any race)	1,066	8.1%

=== Demographic estimates ===
Age distribution estimates from 2023 showed 5.3% of the population under age 5, 26.5% under age 18, 7.4% from 18 to 24, 29.6% from 25 to 44, 27.5% from 45 to 64, and 9.1% 65 or older. There were approximately 1.05 males per female, and the median age was 38.1 years.

The racial makeup of the town, considering races alone or in combination with one or more other races, was 80.3% White, 19.4% Asian, 8.1% Hispanic or Latino, and 4.7% some other race, with less than 1% in any other category. A language other than English was spoken at home by 20.9% of the population.

Family and household characteristics included 63.2% married-couple families, 17.6% family households with a male householder and no spouse present, and 14.1% family households with a female householder and no spouse present. The average household size was 2.80 and the average family size was 3.22.

=== Households and housing ===
The median value of owner-occupied housing units reported in the 2023 American Community Survey 5-year estimate was $795,500. The median gross rent for the same period was $2,355.

=== Income and poverty ===
Median income levels are high. The median income for a household in 2023 (in 2023 inflation-adjusted dollars), according to 2023 American Community Survey 5-Year Estimates, was $157,909 +/- $11,968, compared to $92,911 for Colorado. The median income for families was $168,636. The employment rate was 72.2%. About 2.9% of the population were living below the poverty line, and 4.1% were without health care coverage.

Educational levels are also high. Characteristics of residents 25 years and over in 2023 were that 98.8% were high school graduates or higher, 77.1% held a bachelor's degree or higher (which compares with 46.4% for Colorado), and 37.4% held a graduate or professional degree.

== Businesses ==
Superior’s diverse businesses include national chain retailers and diverse independent retailers, restaurants, service providers, and offices. As of 2026, the Downtown Superior mixed-use development is partially complete, with the central plaza and several commercial units now operational. Construction continues on the 251-unit Alta Flatirons residential complex and a Hyatt Studios hotel, with completion expected in 2027.

== Educational Institutions ==
Superior is part of the Boulder Valley School District (BVSD) and is home to two public schools: Superior Elementary and Eldorado PK-8. The home public high school is Monarch High School in neighboring Louisville. The school district's open enrollment policy also allows students to attend any other BVSD public school as long as space is available. Nearby institutions of higher education include the University of Colorado at Boulder, Naropa University in Boulder, and Front Range Community College campuses in Longmont and Westminster.

== In popular culture ==
Sections of the 1985 movie American Flyers were filmed in Superior.

== Notable people ==
- Marcelo Balboa – soccer star
- Josh Sims – lacrosse player

== Sister city ==
Superior has a sister city, as designated by Sister Cities International:

- Khandbari, Koshi Province, Nepal

== See also ==
- Jefferson Parkway
- Rocky Flats National Wildlife Refuge
