= Colorado State Highway 170 =

State highway in Colorado, United States

State Highway 170
- SH 170 highlighted in red

Route information
- Maintained by CDOT
- Length: 6.969 mi (11.216 km)

Major junctions
- West end: Eldorado Canyon State Park
- East end: US 36 in Superior

Location
- Country: United States
- State: Colorado
- Counties: Boulder

Highway system
- Colorado State Highway System; Interstate; US; State; Scenic
← SH 167	→ SH 172

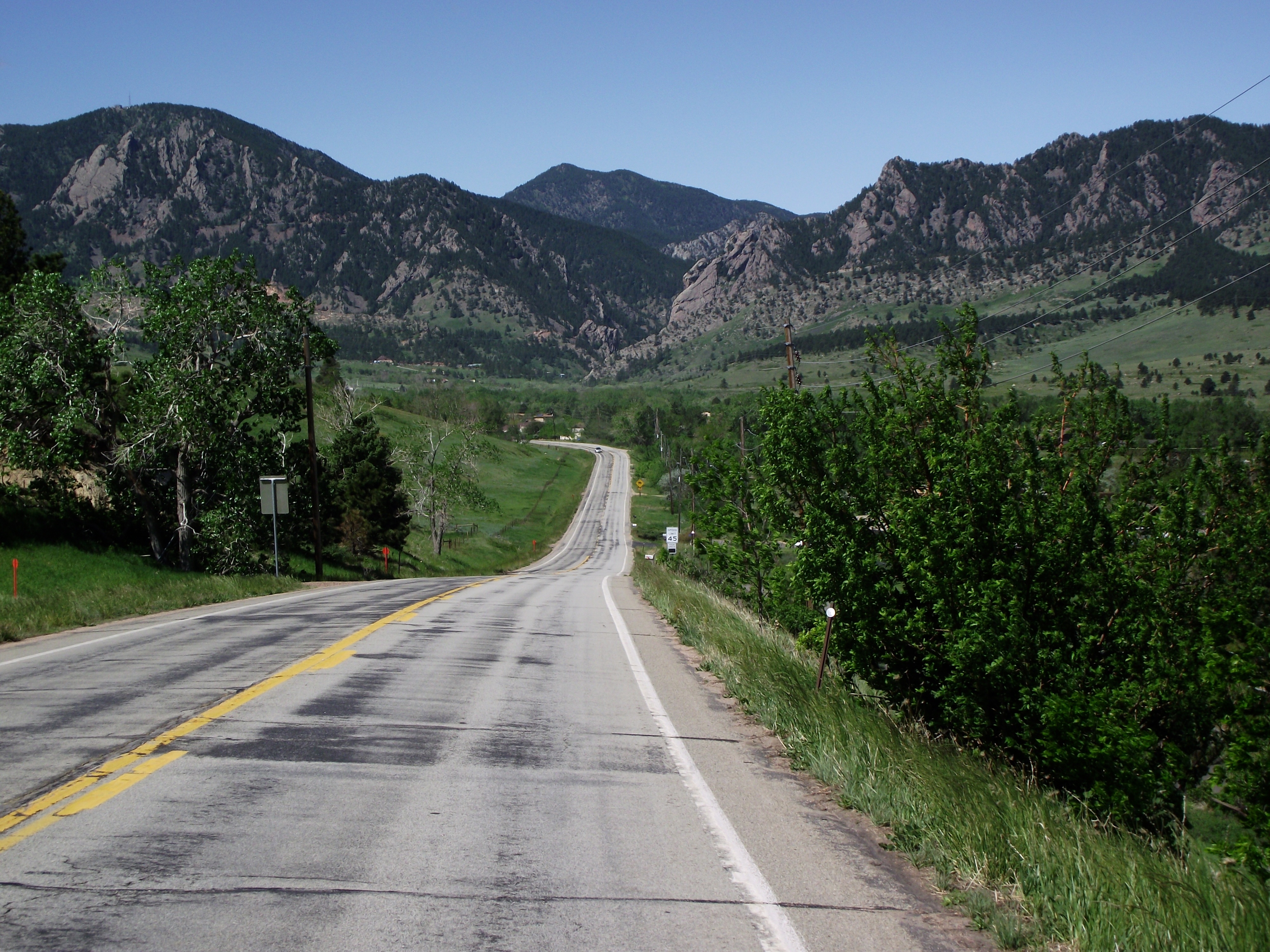
State Highway 170 approaching Eldorado Springs

State Highway 170 (SH 170) is a state highway in Colorado that connects Eldorado Springs and Superior. SH 170's western terminus is at Eldorado Canyon State Park, and the eastern terminus is at U.S. Route 36 (US 36) in Superior.

== Route description ==
The road begins at the edge of Eldorado Canyon State Park at El Dorado Springs as a dirt road. Speed limit in this area is at 10 mph. As the route leaves Downtown Eldorado Springs, it becomes a paved road and the speed limit increases to 25 mph. . SH 170 then heads eastward, meeting County Road 67 before passing through a rural grassy area. The route then meets SH 93, where it becomes Marshall Drive, just north of Marshall Lake. The road then finds its eastern terminus at US 36, the Denver-Boulder Turnpike, passing through the city of Superior.

== Major intersections ==
The entire route is in Boulder County.

Location	mi	km	Destinations	Notes
Eldorado Springs	0.000	0.000	Eldorado Canyon State Park	Western terminus
	2.735	4.402	SH 93 – Boulder, Arvada	
Superior	6.969	11.216	US 36 – Boulder, Denver	Eastern terminus; diverging diamond interchange
1.000 mi = 1.609 km; 1.000 km = 0.621 mi: Concurrency terminus; Proposed; Incomplete access; Route transition
