= Rogers Creek =

Rogers Creek may refer to:

- Rogers Creek (Current River tributary)
- Rogers Creek (Pennsylvania)
- Rogers Creek (Lake Erie), a watershed administered by the Long Point Region Conservation Authority, that drains into Lake Erie
- Sams Creek (New Zealand), originally known as Rogers Creek

== See also ==
- Rogers Brook
- Rodgers Creek, Queensland, Australia
