= Judge Rogers =

Judge Rogers may refer to:

- Henry Wade Rogers (1853–1926), judge of the United States Court of Appeals for the Second Circuit
- John Henry Rogers (1845–1911), judge of the United States District Court for the Western District of Virginia
- John M. Rogers (born 1948), judge of the United States Court of Appeals for the Sixth Circuit
- Judith W. Rogers (born 1939), judge of the United States Court of Appeals for the District of Columbia Circuit
- Richard Dean Rogers (1921–2016), judge of the United States District Court for the District of Kansas
- Waldo Henry Rogers (1908–1964), judge of the United States District Court for the District of New Mexico
- Yvonne Gonzalez Rogers (born 1965), judge of the District Court for the Northern District of California

== See also ==
- M. Casey Rodgers (born 1964), judge of the United States District Court for the Northern District of Florida
- Justice Rogers (disambiguation)
