= South Boulder Creek =

River in Boulder County, Colorado, United States

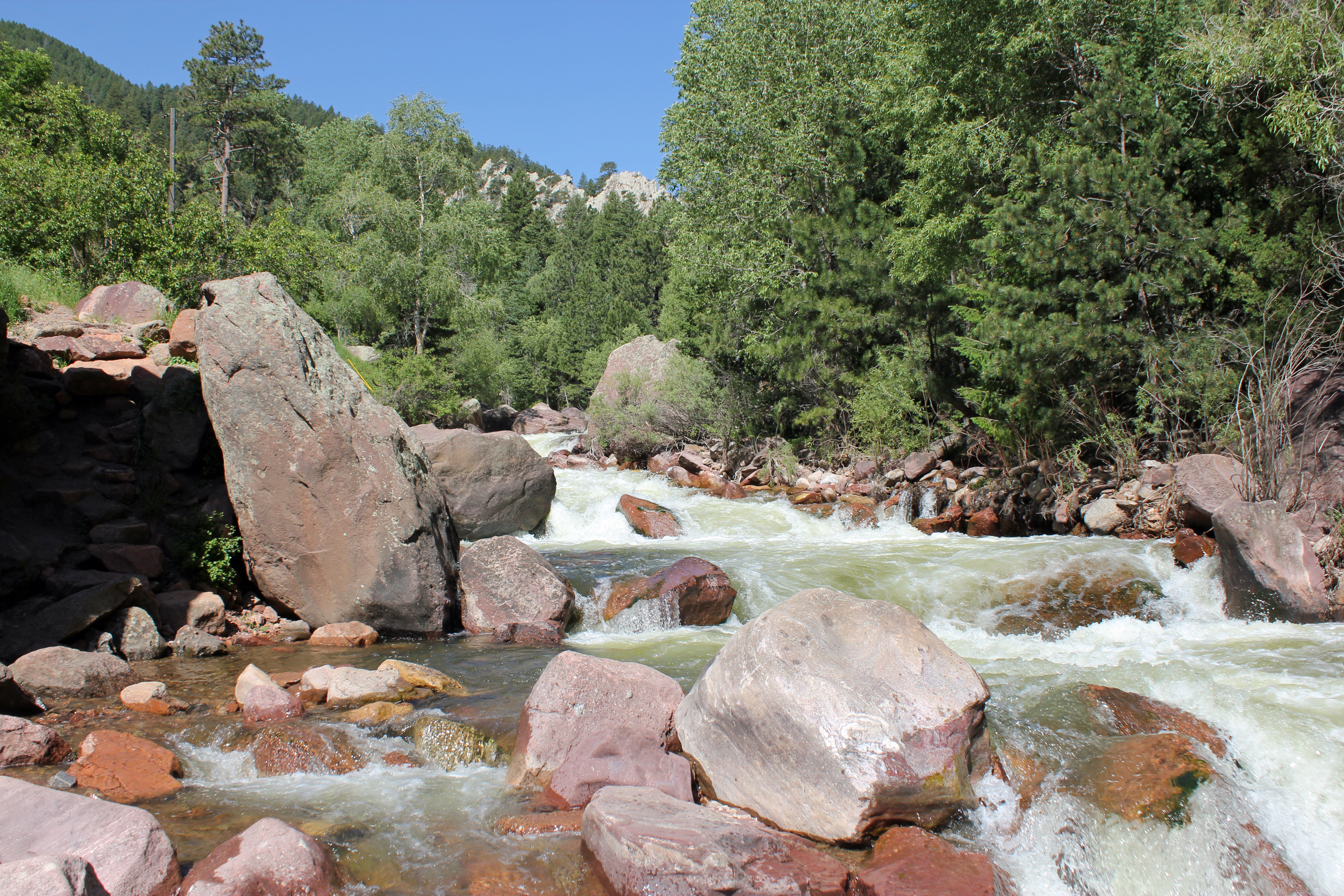
- The creek in Eldorado Canyon State Park.

Physical characteristics
- Source
  - location: Gilpin County, Colorado
  - coordinates: 39°52′13″N 105°41′30″W
- Mouth
  - location: Confluence with Boulder Creek
  - coordinates: 40°02′03″N 105°12′59″W
  - elevation: 5,174 ft (1,577 m)

Basin features
- Progression: Boulder—St. Vrain; South Platte—Platte; Missouri—Mississippi

South Boulder Creek is a tributary of Boulder Creek in central Colorado in the United States. Its source is near Rogers Pass on the Continental Divide. The stream flows to a confluence with Boulder Creek in northeast Boulder. Gross Dam is located on South Boulder Creek, approximately 4 1/2 miles west of Eldorado Springs, Colorado.

== See also ==
- List of rivers of Colorado
