= Rogers Lake =

Rogers Lake may refer to the following lakes in the United States:

- Rogers Dry Lake, California
- Rogers Lake (Minnesota)
- Rogers Lake (Flathead County, Montana), in Glacier National Park
- Lake Rogers Park, Odessa, Florida
