= Eldorado Springs, Colorado =

Census-designated place in Boulder County, Colorado, United States

- census-designated place
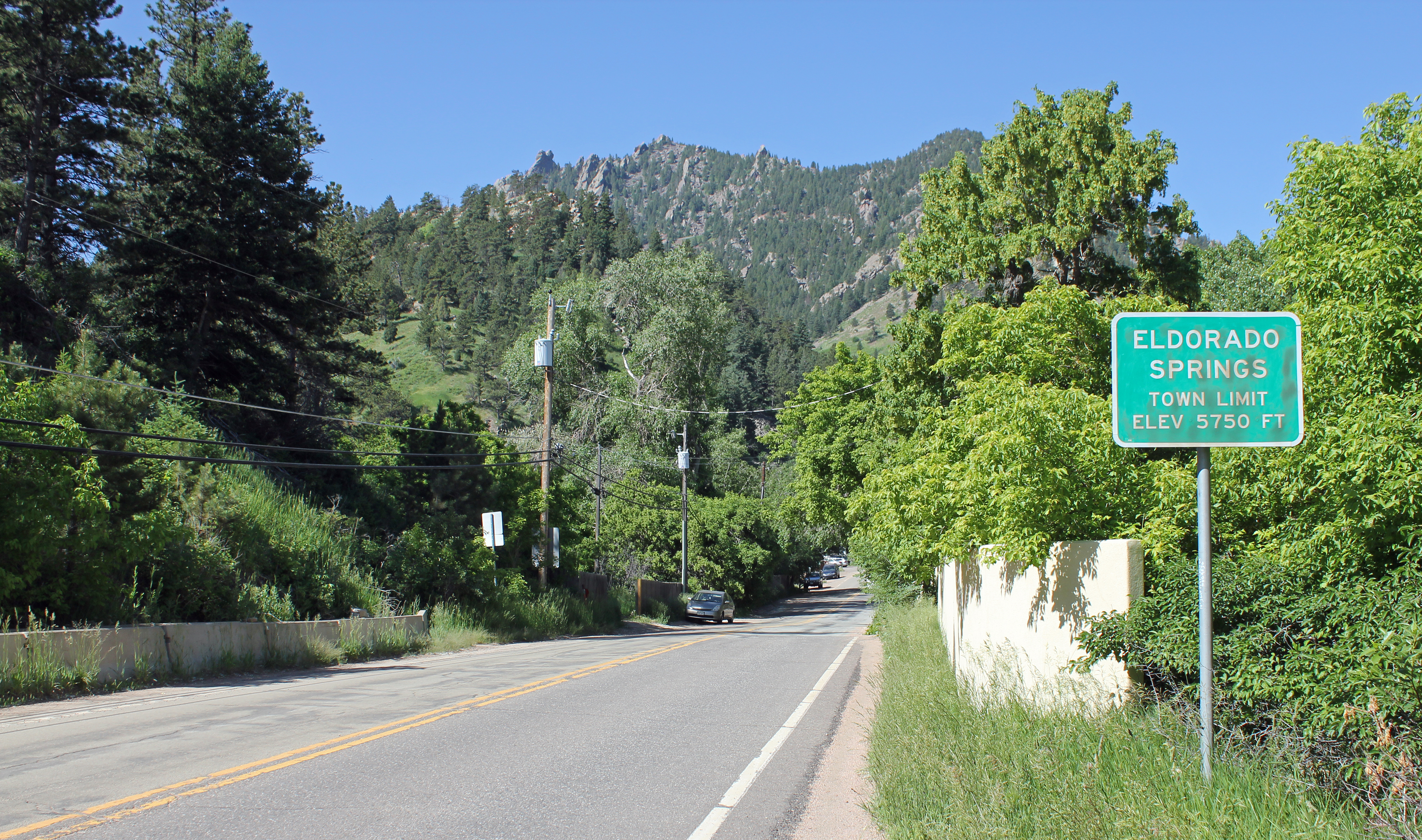
- Eldorado Springs in 2014.

- Location of the Eldorado Springs CDP in Boulder County, Colorado
- Coordinates: 39°56′30″N 105°15′10″W
- Country: United States
- State: Colorado
- County: Boulder

Government
  - Type: unincorporated community
  - Body: Boulder County

Area
  - Total: 2.585 sq mi (6.696 km^{2})
  - Land: 2.584 sq mi (6.692 km^{2})
  - Water: 0.0015 sq mi (0.004 km^{2})
- Elevation: 5,683 ft (1,732 m)

Population (2020)
  - Total: 559
  - Density: 216/sq mi (83.5/km^{2})
- Time zone: UTC−07:00 (MST)
  - Summer (DST): UTC−06:00 (MDT)
- ZIP code: 80025
- Area codes: 303/720/983
- GNIS place ID: 181177
- GNIS CDP ID: 2408071
- FIPS code: 08-23630

Eldorado Springs is an unincorporated community, a census-designated place (CDP), and a post office located in and governed by Boulder County, Colorado, United States. The CDP is a part of the Boulder, CO Metropolitan Statistical Area. The Eldorado Springs post office has the ZIP code 80025 (post office boxes). At the 2020 United States census, the population of the Eldorado Springs CDP was 559.

Eldorado Canyon State Park, adjacent and upstream, is famous for its classic North-American climbing routes.

== History ==
The Moffat Lakes Resort opened on July 4, 1905. The Eldorado Hotel open at the resort in 1908, and the resort became known as Eldorado Springs. In 1916, future president Dwight Eisenhower and new bride Mamie Eisenhower celebrated their honeymoon in one of the cabins at the resort. The Eldorado Springs, Colorado, post office opened on May 1, 1930. Known for its good tasting spring water, "Eldorado Springs" bottled water is sold in stores around Colorado. Eldorado Canyon State Park opened in August 1978 adjacent to the community.

=== Notable residents ===
- Ivy Baldwin (1866–1953), best known locally for his Eldorado Canyon tightrope walks across South Boulder Creek
- Mark Udall (1950–), former U.S. Congressman and U.S. Senator

== Geography ==
Eldorado Springs is located along South Boulder Creek in southern Boulder County.

The Eldorado Springs CDP has an area of 1,655 acres (6.696 km^{2}), including 0.99 acres (0.004 km^{2}) of water. To the southwest is Eldorado Mountain.

=== Climate ===
Climate data for Eldorado Springs, Colorado
Month	Jan	Feb	Mar	Apr	May	Jun	Jul	Aug	Sep	Oct	Nov	Dec	Year
Mean daily maximum °F (°C)	46 (8)	49 (9)	56 (13)	63 (17)	72 (22)	81 (27)	86 (30)	85 (29)	77 (25)	65 (18)	54 (12)	46 (8)	65 (18)
Mean daily minimum °F (°C)	22 (−6)	23 (−5)	29 (−2)	36 (2)	44 (7)	51 (11)	56 (13)	55 (13)	47 (8)	38 (3)	28 (−2)	22 (−6)	37.6 (3.1)
Source: Accuweather

== Demographics ==
The United States Census Bureau initially defined the Eldorado Springs CDP for the United States Census 2000.

Eldorado Springs CDP, Colorado
Year	Pop.	±%
2000	557	—
2010	585	+5.0%
2020	559	−4.4%
Source: United States Census Bureau

== See also ==
- Front Range Urban Corridor
- Eldorado Canyon State Park
