= Eldorado Canyon State Park =

State park in Colorado, United States

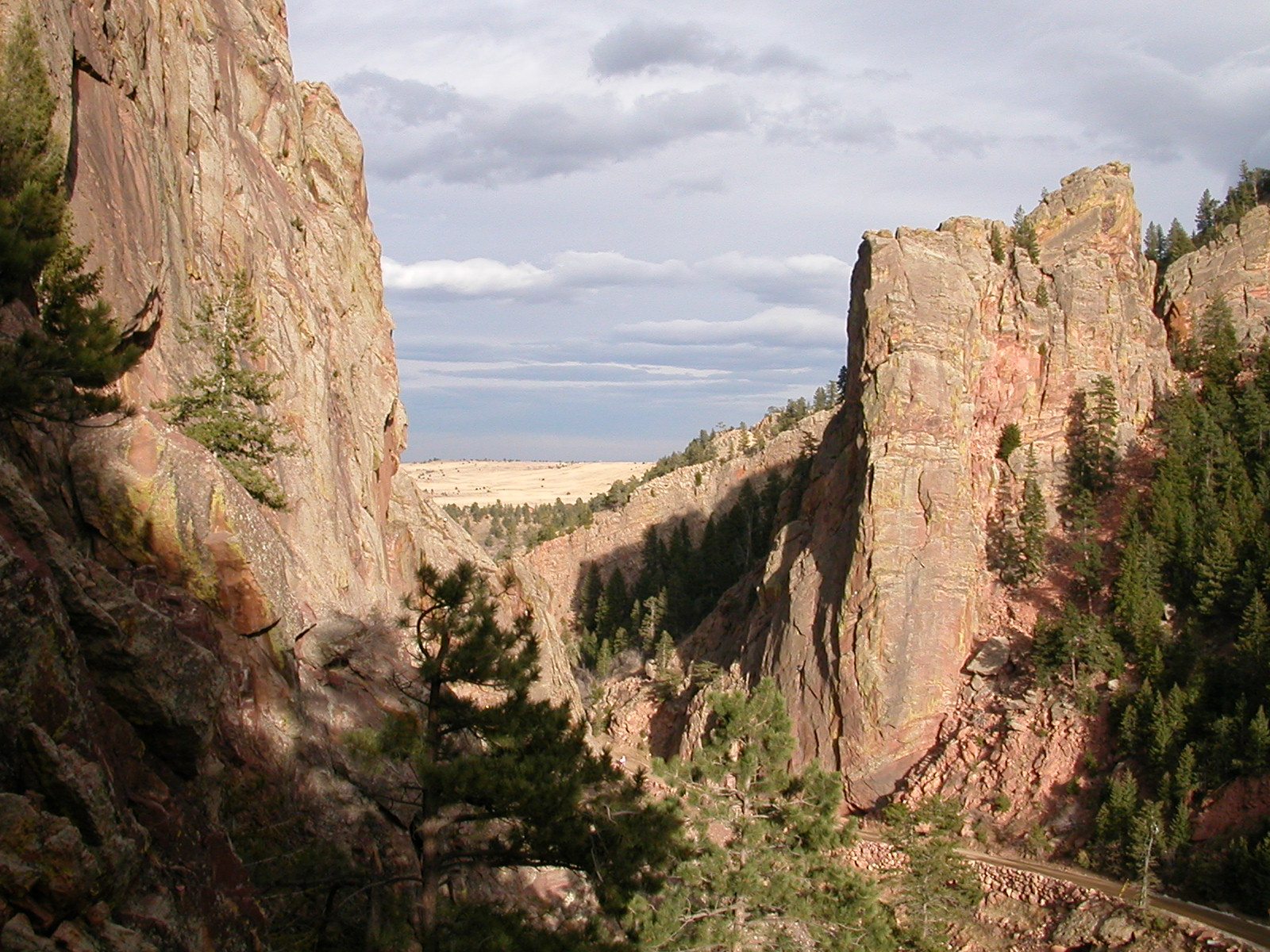
- View from the climbers access trail to the Redgarden Wall a portion of which can be seen on the left. The Bastille sits across South Boulder Creek to the right.

- Location within Colorado
- Location: Boulder County, Colorado, U.S.
- Nearest city: Boulder
- Coordinates: 39°55′50″N 105°17′30″W
- Area: 885 acres (3.58 km^{2})
- Created: 1978
- Operator: Colorado Parks and Wildlife
- Visitors: 643,147 (in 2021)

Eldorado Canyon State Park is part of the Colorado State Park system. It was established in 1978 and is located in Boulder County south of the city of Boulder. The park consists of two areas, the Inner Canyon (developed area) and Crescent Meadows (undeveloped area). The park encompasses 885 acres (3.6 km^{2}) with a variety of recreation opportunities available. Eldorado Canyon is home to one of the world's most accessible and comprehensive rock climbing areas. This state park is open during daylight hours only, visitors are expected to leave before dusk. Timed vehicle entry reservations are required on weekends and federal holidays between May 1 and October 1.

== History ==
Ute Indians were the first inhabitants into this area that is nestled against the foothills near Boulder. The Indians lived within the walls of the canyon because they provided protection from the harsh Colorado winters. Settlers soon followed in search of gold and agriculture. Eldorado Canyon is known for its geologic history dating back billions of years. Rock formations near the visitors center are estimated to be over 1.5 billion years old.

At the beginning of the twentieth century, the community of Eldorado Springs was established and became known as a resort for the elite. The town offered visitors warm artesian springs and lush hotels, including the Crags Hotel, the Eldorado and the Grand View. Numerous celebrities and Denver residents enjoyed the beautiful getaway until a fire burned the Crags Hotel in 1912. Crags Hotel operated from 1908 to 1912.

The town also received attention between 1906 and 1949, when Ivy Baldwin performed tight rope acts across the canyon 580 feet (180 m). More recent visitors appreciate views of the park from a higher perspective, but as rock climbers rather than from a tight rope.

== Recreation ==
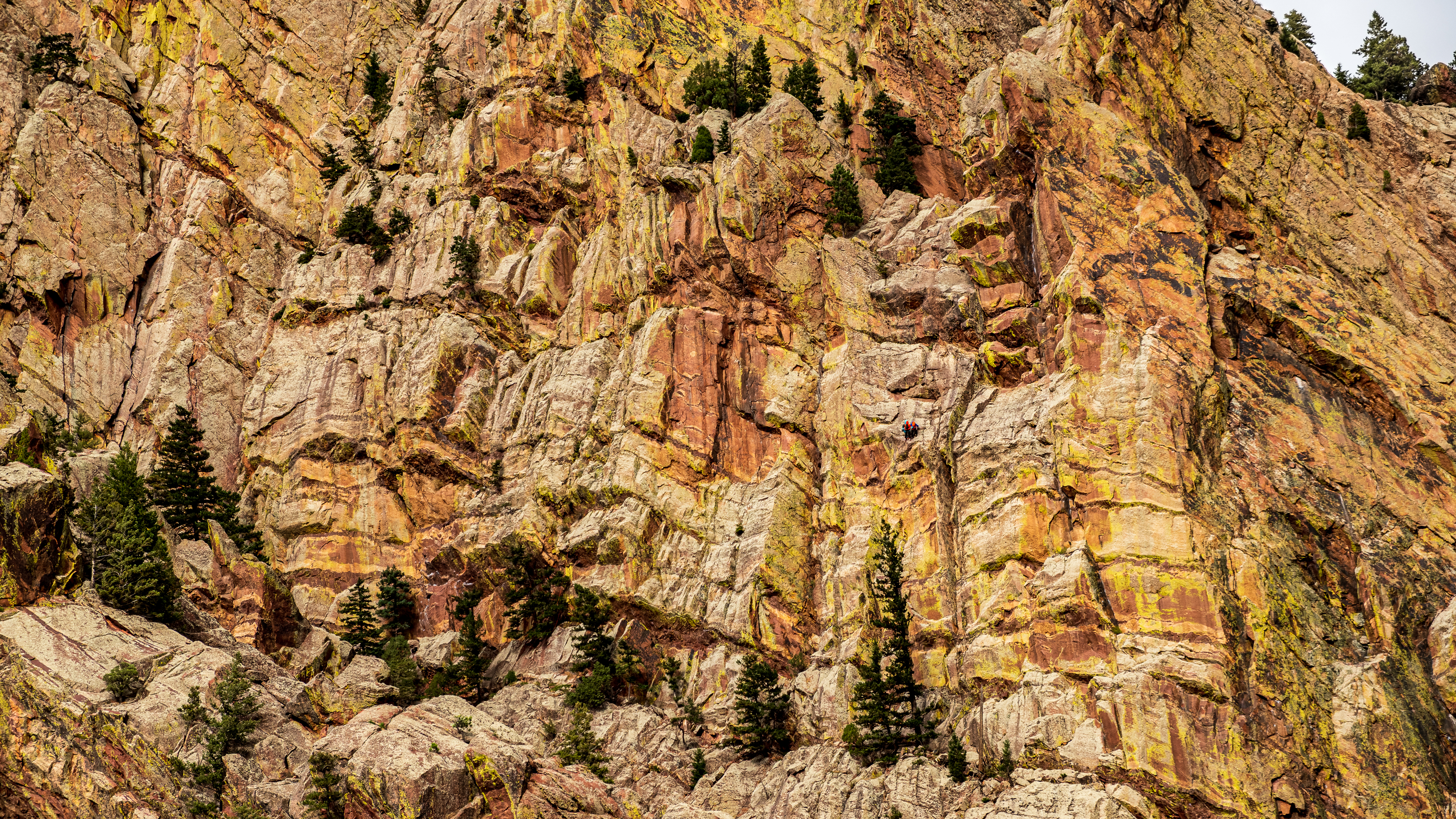
Climbers partway up a vertical wall in Eldorado Canyon

The biggest draw to Eldorado Canyon State Park is rock climbing. Eldorado Canyon offers over 1000 technical rock climbing routes. The beauty of this canyon also engages the non-climber. Park visitors may hike or mountain bike over some of 11 miles (18 km) of picturesque trails that vary from easy to difficult and reach out to adjoining public lands outside the park. Rattlesnake Gulch Trail leads to the Crags Hotel Site and Continental Divide Overlook. Visitors may also picnic by or fish in scenic South Boulder Creek. In the winter, Eldorado offers hiking and cross-country skiing and snowshoeing.

== Geography ==
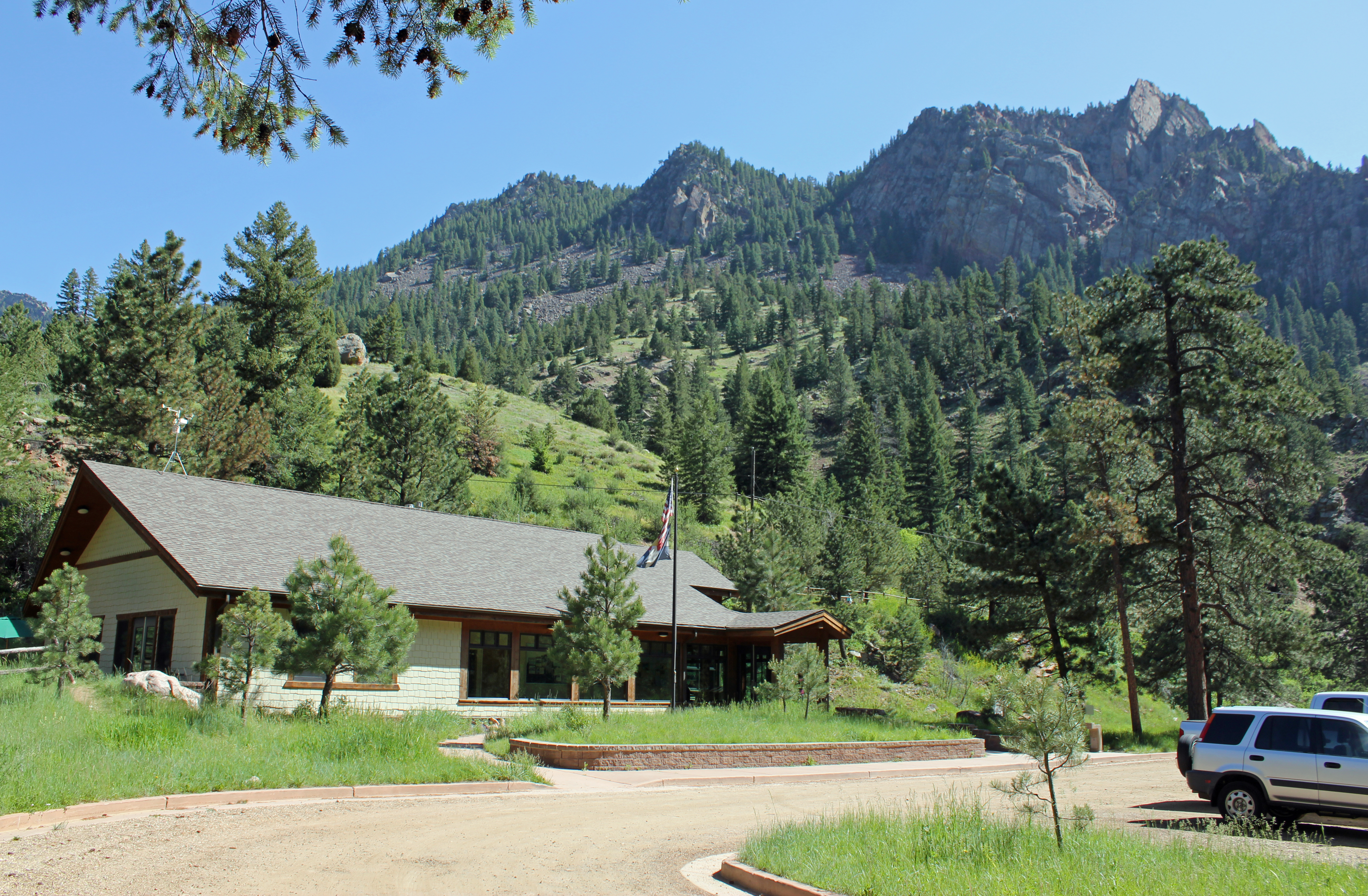
The park's ranger station and visitors' center, with Shirttail Peak in the background.

The park entrance lies immediately west of Eldorado Springs on State Highway 170. To the west of Eldorado Canyon State Park are the Roosevelt National Forest and Colorado's Front Range. East of the site, there are the heavily populated areas of Boulder and Denver on the High Plains.

=== Climate ===
Snow and ice are common on roads and trails from mid-October through late April. In the summer months, snow is still possible but less common. Varying conditions throughout a given day can be expected throughout the year. Summer days can typically have beautiful sunny mornings and short sudden thunderstorms in the afternoon.

== See also ==
- Boulder, Colorado
- Eldorado Springs, Colorado
- List of Colorado state parks
- Eldorado Mountain
