= Boulder Creek (Colorado) =

River in Colorado

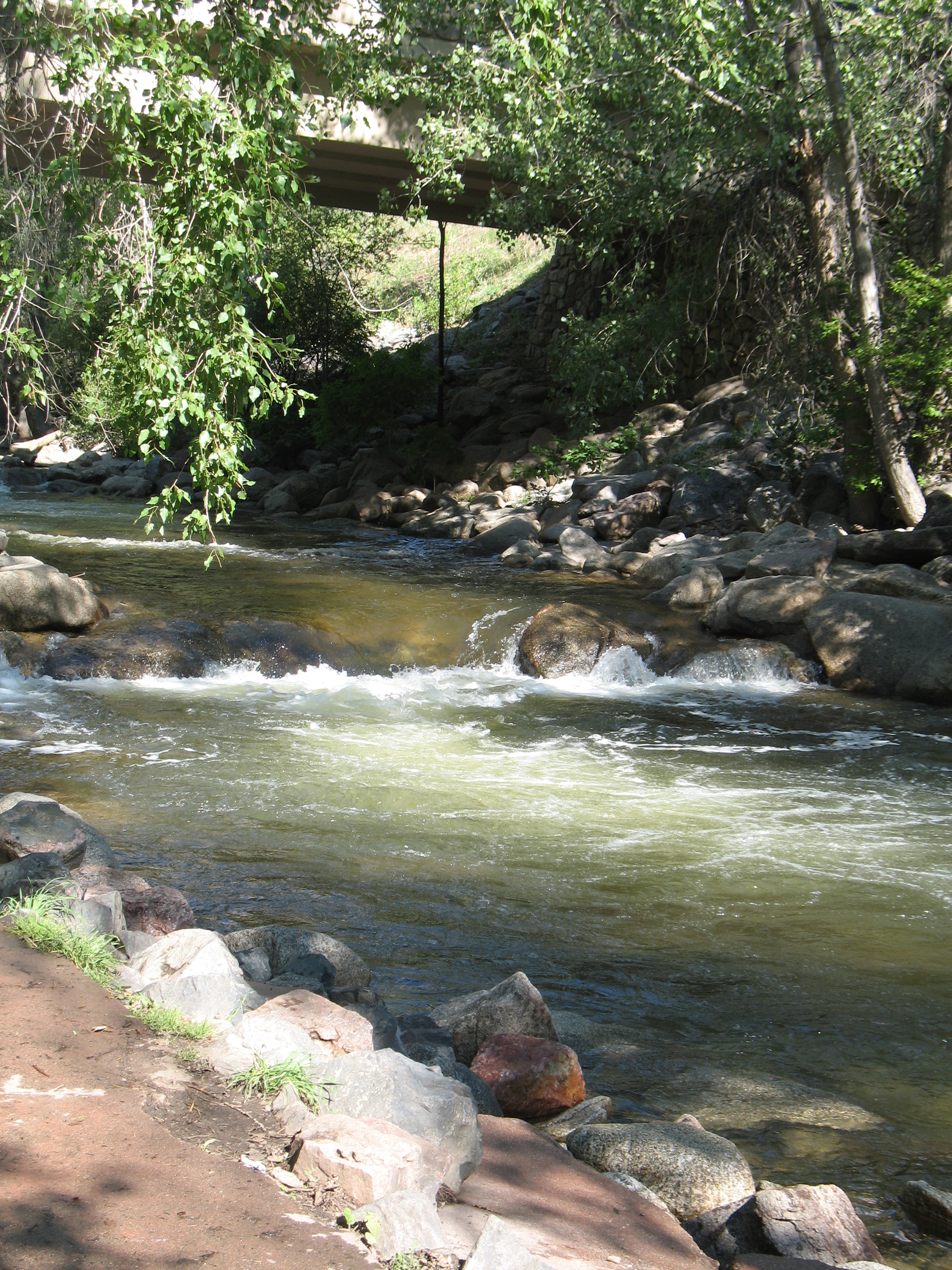

Physical characteristics
- Source
  - location: Confluence of North Boulder Creek and Middle Boulder Creek
  - coordinates: 40°00′15″N 105°24′21″W
- Mouth
  - location: Confluence with Saint Vrain
  - coordinates: 40°09′33″N 105°00′35″W
  - elevation: 4,852 ft (1,479 m)

Basin features
- Progression: Saint Vrain—South Platte—Platte— Missouri—Mississippi

Boulder Creek is a 31.4-mile-long (50.5 km) creek draining the Rocky Mountains to the west of Boulder, Colorado, as well as the city itself and surrounding plains.

== Route ==
The creek is formed by two main tributaries rising along the Continental Divide: North and Middle Boulder Creek, and later joined by South Boulder Creek.

North Boulder Creek forms in a valley between Navajo Peak and Arikaree Peak on the Continental Divide, in the Green Lakes chain of lakes. The creek flows 17.8 miles (28.6 km) past the community of Switzerland Park to join Middle Boulder Creek.

Middle Boulder Creek rises as two forks from the Continental Divide: the North Fork rises in a cirque below Mount Neva and flows 7.5 miles (12.1 km) to the South Fork. The South Fork rises at Rollins Pass on the Continental Divide and flows 5.5 miles (8.9 km) to the North Fork. From the junction of the two forks, Middle Boulder Creek, 13.7 miles (22.0 km) long, flows east through the towns of Eldora and Nederland into Barker Meadow Reservoir, a water supply for the city of Boulder, before joining North Boulder Creek to form the main stem of Boulder Creek.

From its source at the confluence of the North and Middle Boulder forks, Boulder Creek flows down Boulder Canyon and through downtown Boulder. On the east edge of the city, the creek receives South Boulder Creek, which rises at Rogers Pass on the Continental Divide, just south of the Moffat Tunnel. South Boulder Creek flows 40.0 miles (64.4 km) through Rollinsville, Gross Reservoir, and Eldorado Canyon before leaving the mountains and curving past the south and east sides of Boulder to its mouth at Boulder Creek.

After leaving the city, Boulder Creek flows northeast into Weld County, where it joins St. Vrain Creek, and on to a confluence with the South Platte River. Its waters flow into the Missouri River and Mississippi River and, ultimately, the Gulf of Mexico.

== Recreation ==
Boulder Creek is a summer recreational spot for outdoor activities, including tubing, fly fishing, and wading. The annual Boulder Creek Festival, held along the creekside civic area between the library and Central Park, opens the summer season on Memorial Day weekend.

== Fish species ==
Fish surveys from 1990, 1995, and 2006 found the following species of fish in Boulder Creek.

Common name	Scientific name	Native to Colorado?	Image
Sand shiner	Notropis stramineus	Yes	
Iowa darter	Etheostoma exile	Yes	
White sucker	Catostomus commersoni	Yes	
Creek chub	Semotilus atromaculatus	Yes	
Longnose sucker	Catostomus catostomus	Yes	
Fathead minnow	Pimephalus promelas	Yes	
Longnose dace	Rhinichthys cataractae	Yes	
Largemouth bass	Micropterus salmoides	No	
Bluegill	Lepomis macrochirus	No	
Common carp	Cyprinus carpio	No	
Yellow perch	Perca flavescens	No	
Plains topminnow	Fundulus sciadicus	Yes	
Black crappie	Promoxis nigromaculatus	No	
Brown trout	Salmo trutta	No	
Rainbow trout	Oncorhynchus mykiss	No	
Cutbow trout	Oncorhynchus clarkia × mykiss	No	
Golden shiner	Notemigonus crysoleucas	No	
Green sunfish	Lepomis cyanellus	Yes	
Pumpkinseed	Lepomis gibbosus	No	
Western mosquitofish	Gambusia affinis	No	
Central stoneroller	Campostoma anomalum	Yes	
Orangespotted sunfish	Lepomis humilis	Yes	

== See also ==
- List of rivers of Colorado
- Bibliography of Colorado
- Geography of Colorado
- History of Colorado
- Index of Colorado-related articles
- List of Colorado-related lists
- Outline of Colorado
