= Rogers Township =

Rogers Township may refer to:

- Rogers Township, Sebastian County, Arkansas, in Sebastian County, Arkansas
- Rogers Township, Ford County, Illinois
- Rogers Township, Presque Isle County, Michigan
- Rogers Township, Cass County, Minnesota
- Rogers Township, Barnes County, North Dakota
