= Maria Rogers Oral History Program =

The Maria Rogers Oral History Program, or MROHP, collects and archives oral histories about Boulder County. Started in 1976, the program began with a handful of donated interviews, but now includes more than 1600 interviews, available both on the internet and at the Boulder Public Library's Carnegie Branch Library for Local History.

== The Woman Behind the Collection ==
The Oral History Program is named for Maria M. Rogers, the woman who directed and developed the program for more than twelve years from 1985 to 1997. Maria gleaned information from hundreds of the program's oral history interviews for her book, In Other Words: Oral Histories of the Colorado Frontier, which captures the personal and public history of the pioneers and early residents of Colorado.

== About the Collection ==
The Maria Rogers Oral History Program Collection contained more than 1,650 interviews as of 2010, with 40 to 100 new interviews being added each year. Many of the interviews have been recorded, transcribed and archived by volunteers for the program. Some interviews have been donated to the collection by other educational, governmental, and cultural organizations or individuals in the community.

The interviews are about all aspects of life in Boulder County, providing a detailed account of both daily life and major events. The lives of a wide range of people are recorded, including pioneers and other settlers, cattlemen, farmers, housewives, university professors, local government officials and political activists, attorneys, physicians, coal miners, teachers, artists, scientists, and more. Although interviews are drawn from residents of Boulder County, they often cover topics that are of general interest, such as city planning and open space, political activism, mountaineering and issues involving the disposal of nuclear waste, among many others.

== Digital Archive - Access ==
Donations from the Rogers family and from the Boulder Library Foundation have allowed the program to digitize all of its interviews and create a digital archive that is linked to the Boulder Public Library's catalog, making it easy to research the contents of the interviews by doing a search for names, places or keywords.

The collection is housed in the Carnegie Library for Local History, a branch of the Boulder Public Library, located at 1125 Pine Street in Boulder, Colorado. Patrons may listen to audio of all of the interviews or watch DVDs of the newer interviews at the library. Access to files that often include supplementary information about the narrators is also available at the library.

Full audio with summaries or transcripts of the oral histories are also available online at

== Special Collections ==
There are several special projects that have been conducted consisting of groups of interviews on specific topics related to the history of the city of Boulder and Boulder County. These special collections currently include the following:

- Activist Women in Boulder County;
- Boulder City Government;
- Boulder County Parks and Open Space Interviews;
- City Planning in Boulder;
- First United Methodist Church of Boulder;
- Industrial Mine Camp;
- Naropa and Buddhism in Boulder;
- Post-WWII Housing in Boulder;
- Rocky Flats Nuclear Weapons Plant;
- Voices of Black Women of Boulder County.
