= Justice Rogers =

Justice Rogers may refer to:

- Chase T. Rogers (born 1956), chief justice of the Connecticut Supreme Court
- Horatio Rogers Jr. (1836–1904), associate justice of the Rhode Island Supreme Court
- John G. Rogers (1849–1926), associate justice of the Maryland Court of Appeals
- Wynne Grey Rogers (1874–1946), associate justice of the Louisiana Supreme Court

== See also ==
- Judge Rogers (disambiguation)
