= Rogers Lake (Minnesota) =

Lake in the state of Minnesota, United States

- Location within Minnesota
- Location: Dakota County, Minnesota
- Coordinates: 44°52′17″N 93°8′22″W
- Type: lake

Rogers Lake is a lake in Dakota County, in the U.S. state of Minnesota.

Rogers Lake was named for E. G. Rogers, a pioneer farmer who settled there.

Wagon Wheel Trail divides the two sections of the lake (the northern is sometimes referred to as "Mendakota Lake") which are connected by a culvert (a popular fishing spot). The south shore is occupied by Saint Thomas Academy and the Patterson Companies headquarters. Interstate 35E is routed along the western shore. A paved trail runs between 35E and the lake, from Mendota Heights Road to Rogers Lake Parm. The park is located on the northwest corner of the lower lake, and is a popular area for fishing and skateboarding in the summer. Mendakota Country Club surrounds the northern section. The remainder of the shoreline is occupied by private homes and accompanying land.

== See also ==
- List of lakes in Minnesota
