= Rogers (given name) =

Rogers is a masculine given name which may refer to:

- Rogers Aloro, Ugandan footballer
- Rogers Badgett (1917–2005), American businessman and philanthropist
- Rogers Beckett (born 1977), American football player
- Rogers Birnie (1851–1939), American army officer and explorer of Death Valley
- Rogers Blood (1922–1944), American Marine Corps officer
- Rogers Brubaker (born 1956), American professor of sociology
- Rogers Cadenhead (born 1967), American technology writer
- Rogers Caldwell (1890–1968), American businessman and banker
- Rogers Covey-Crump (born 1944), British tenor and early music performer
- Rogers Gaines (born 1989), American football player
- Rogers Govender (born 1960), South African Anglican priest, Dean of Manchester
- Rogers Hornsby (1896–1963), American baseball player, manager and coach, member of the National Baseball Hall of Fame
- Rogers Lehew (1928–2021), American football player, coach and executive
- Rogers Masson (born 1968), American record producer and songwriter
- Rogers McVaugh (1909–2009), American professor of botany
- Rogers Morton (1914–1979), American politician, U.S. Secretary of the Interior and Secretary of Commerce
- Rogers Mtagwa (born 1979), Tanzanian featherweight boxer
- Rogers Ofime (born 1973), Nigerian-Canadian television producer and director
- Rogers Olipa (born 2001), Ugandan cricketer
- Rogers Ruding (1751–1820), English cleric and numismatist
- Rogers Smith (born 1953), American political scientist
- Rogers Stevens (born 1970), American rock guitarist
- Rogers E. M. Whitaker (1900–1981), American editor of and contributor to The New Yorker magazine
- Rogers H. Wright (1927–2013), American psychologist
