= Rogers High School =

Rogers High School can refer to:

- Rogers High School (Arkansas), Rogers, Arkansas
- Rogers Heritage High School, Rogers, Arkansas
- Rogers High School, Michigan City, Indiana, now merged into Michigan City High School
- Rogers High School (Wyoming, Michigan)
- Rogers High School (Rogers, Minnesota)
- Rogers High School (Toledo, Ohio)
- Will Rogers High School, Tulsa, Oklahoma
- Rogers High School (Rhode Island), Newport, Rhode Island
- Rogers High School (Rogers, Texas)
- Governor John R. Rogers High School, Puyallup, Washington
- John R. Rogers High School, Spokane, Washington

== See also ==
- George Rogers Clark High School (Kentucky), Winchester, Kentucky
- T. H. Rogers School, Houston, Texas
