= Rogers Creek (Current River tributary) =

Stream in the U.S. state of Missouri

Rogers Creek is a stream in Carter and Shannon counties in the Ozarks of southeast Missouri. It is a tributary of the Current River.

The stream headwaters are in eastern Shannon County at 37°04′08″N 91°13′52″W and its confluence with the Current River in northwestern Carter County is at 37°02′56″N 91°03′42″W.

Rogers Creek most likely was named after John Rogers, a pioneer settler.

== See also ==
- List of rivers of Missouri
