= Rogers Pass (Colorado) =

Mountain pass in Colorado, USA

- Interactive map of Rogers Pass
- Elevation: 11,886 feet (3,623 m)
- Traversed by: trail

Third Approach
- Location: Boulder / Grand counties, Colorado, U.S.
- Range: Front Range
- Coordinates: 39°52′13″N 105°41′47″W
- Topo map: USGS Empire

Rogers Pass, elevation 11,866 ft (3,617 m), is a mountain pass in the Front Range of central Colorado. The pass crosses the continental divide in the James Peak Wilderness.
