= Colorado State Highway 72 =

State highway in Colorado, United States

State Highway 72
- SH 72 highlighted in red

Route information
- Maintained by CDOT
- Length: 51.01 mi (82.09 km)

Major junctions
- South end: I-70 in Wheat Ridge
- SH 93 in rural Jefferson County; SH 119 at Nederland
- North end: SH 7 east of Allenspark

Location
- Country: United States
- State: Colorado
- Counties: Jefferson, Boulder, Gilpin

Highway system
- Colorado State Highway System; Interstate; US; State; Scenic
← SH 71	→ SH 74

State Highway 72 (SH 72) is a 51-mile-long (82 km) state highway passing through the foothills and the eastern edge of the Front Range. Its southern terminus is at Interstate 70 (I-70) in Wheat Ridge, and its northern terminus is at SH 7 east of Allenspark.

== Route description ==
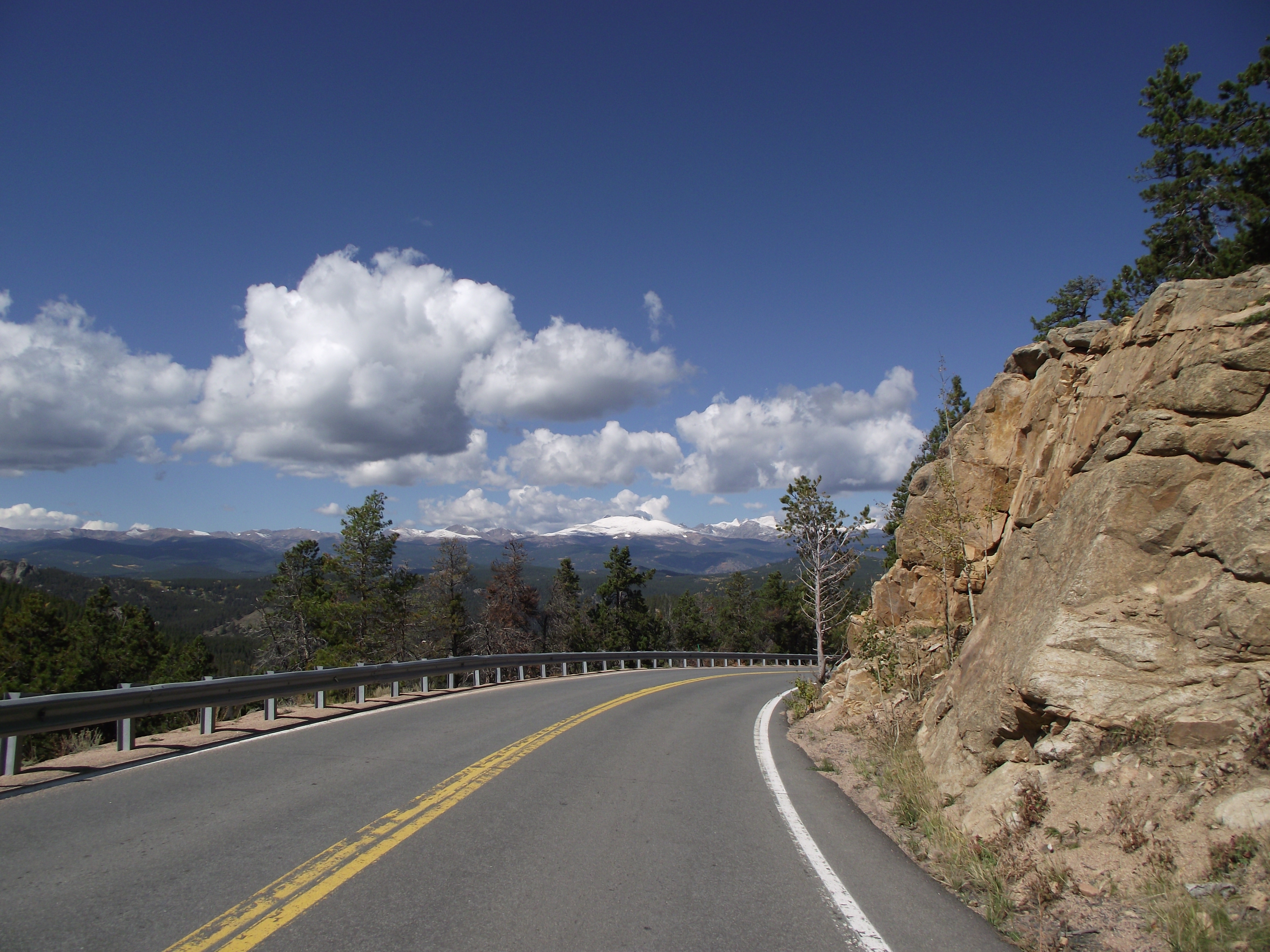
View of Continental Divide from State Highway 72 west of Wondervu

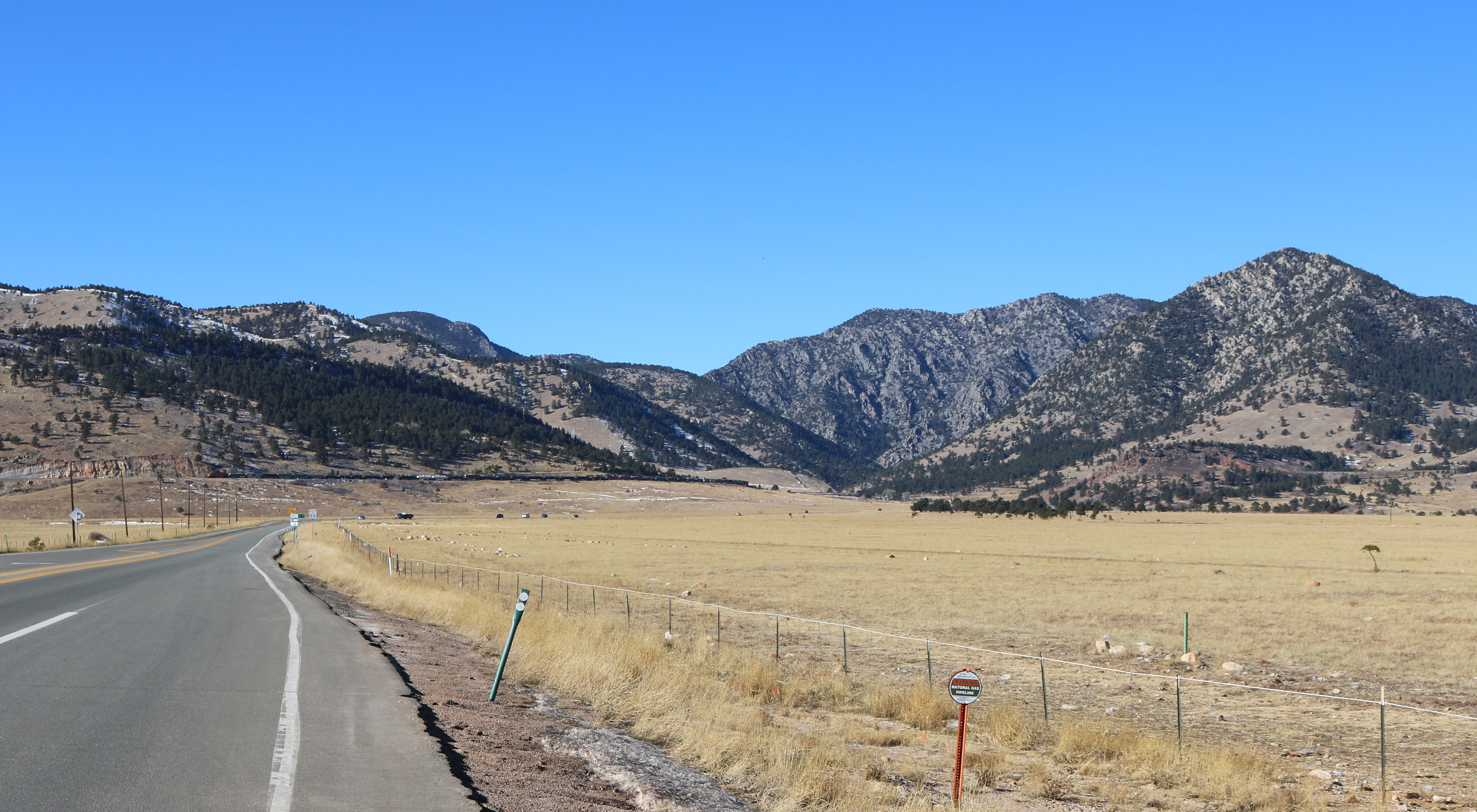
SH 72 looking west as it enters Coal Creek Canyon, just to the west of the intersection with SH 93

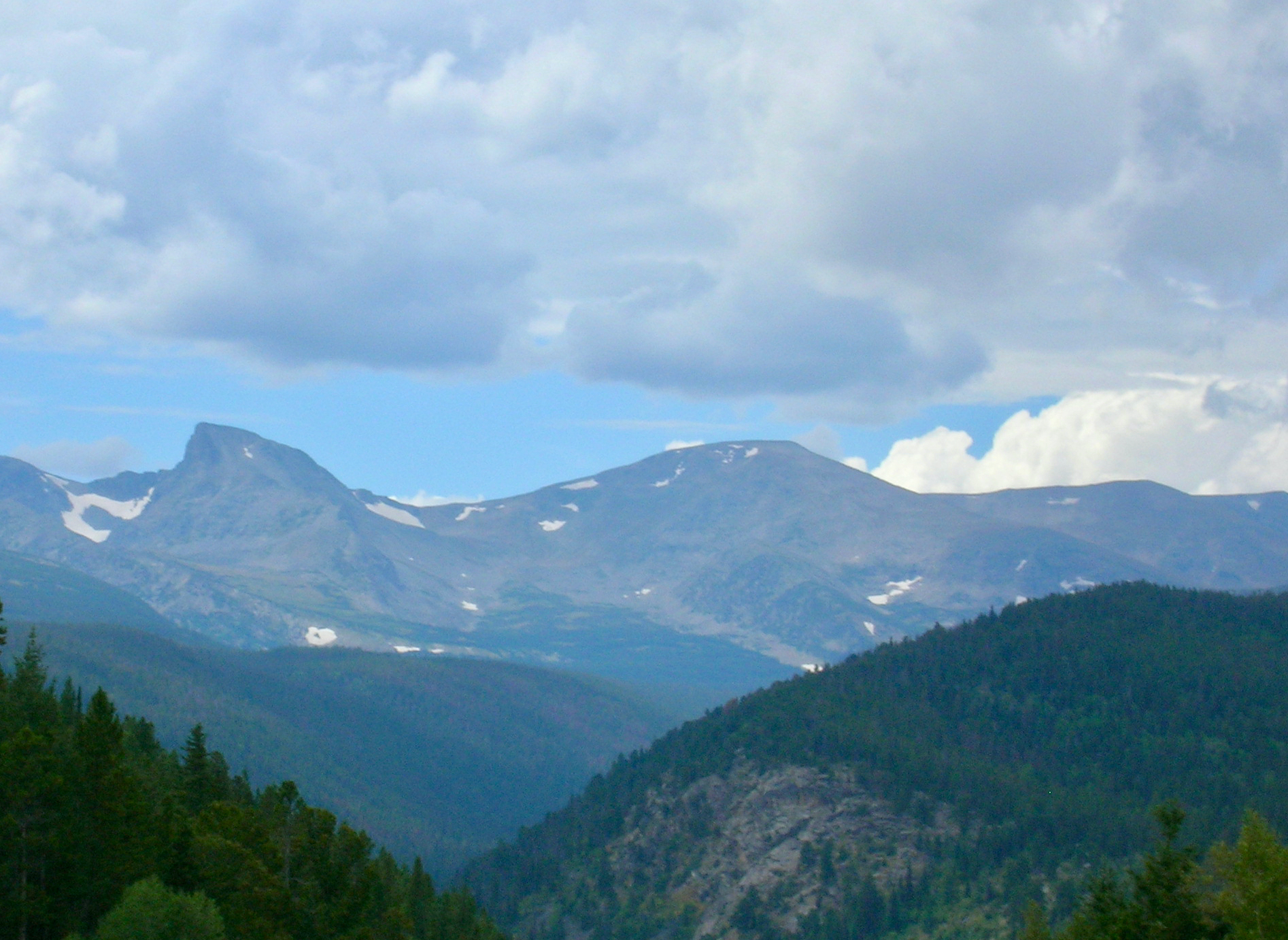
Westward view of Sawtooth Mountain from SH 72, just south of its northern terminus in Lyons

The route is a mainly rural, scenic, mountainous highway; not having many junctions. It begins at I-70 (Exit 266) in Wheat Ridge as Ward Road. It continues north through the western parts of Arvada where it becomes Coal Creek Canyon Rd. The highway continues west-north-west through Coal Creek Canyon and aptly named Wondervu, across the Union Pacific Railroad tracks at Pinecliffe, eventually joining the Peak to Peak Scenic Byway northbound. For three miles along the Byway it coincides with SH 119. The two routes diverge at Nederland. From Nederland, SH 72 continues north along the Byway past Ward to its terminus with SH 7 east of Allenspark.

== History ==
The route was established in the 1920s, when it began at 46th Avenue in Denver and headed northwest to Nederland. The section of the present-day SH 72 north of Nederland was designated as SH 160. By 1936, the southeastern terminus had been moved to SH 58, itself since relocated. The section from SH 93 east was paved by 1946, and the route was paved entirely by 1958. In 1968, SH 160 was deleted and SH 72 took the route from Nederland to Raymond.

== Major intersections ==
County	Location	mi	km	Destinations	Notes
Jefferson	Wheat Ridge	0.00	0.00	I-70 – Denver	Southern terminus; I-70 exit 266; interchange
Jefferson	Arvada	10.65	17.14	SH 93 – Golden, Eldorado Springs, Boulder	
Boulder	No major junctions				
Gilpin	No major junctions				
Boulder	Nederland	29.37	47.27	SH 119 south – Rollinsville, Black Hawk, Central City	South end of SH 119 overlap
Boulder	Nederland	32.37	52.09	SH 119 north – Boulder	North end of SH 119 overlap
Boulder		54.06	87.00	SH 7 – Estes Park, Lyons	Northern terminus
1.000 mi = 1.609 km; 1.000 km = 0.621 mi: Concurrency terminus
