= Colorado State Highway 46 =

State highway in Colorado, United States

State Highway 46
- SH 46 highlighted in red

Route information
- Maintained by CDOT
- Length: 6.610 mi (10.638 km)

Major junctions
- West end: SH 119 near Black Hawk
- East end: CR 70

Location
- Country: United States
- State: Colorado
- Counties: Gilpin

Highway system
- Colorado State Highway System; Interstate; US; State; Scenic
← SH 45	→ SH 47

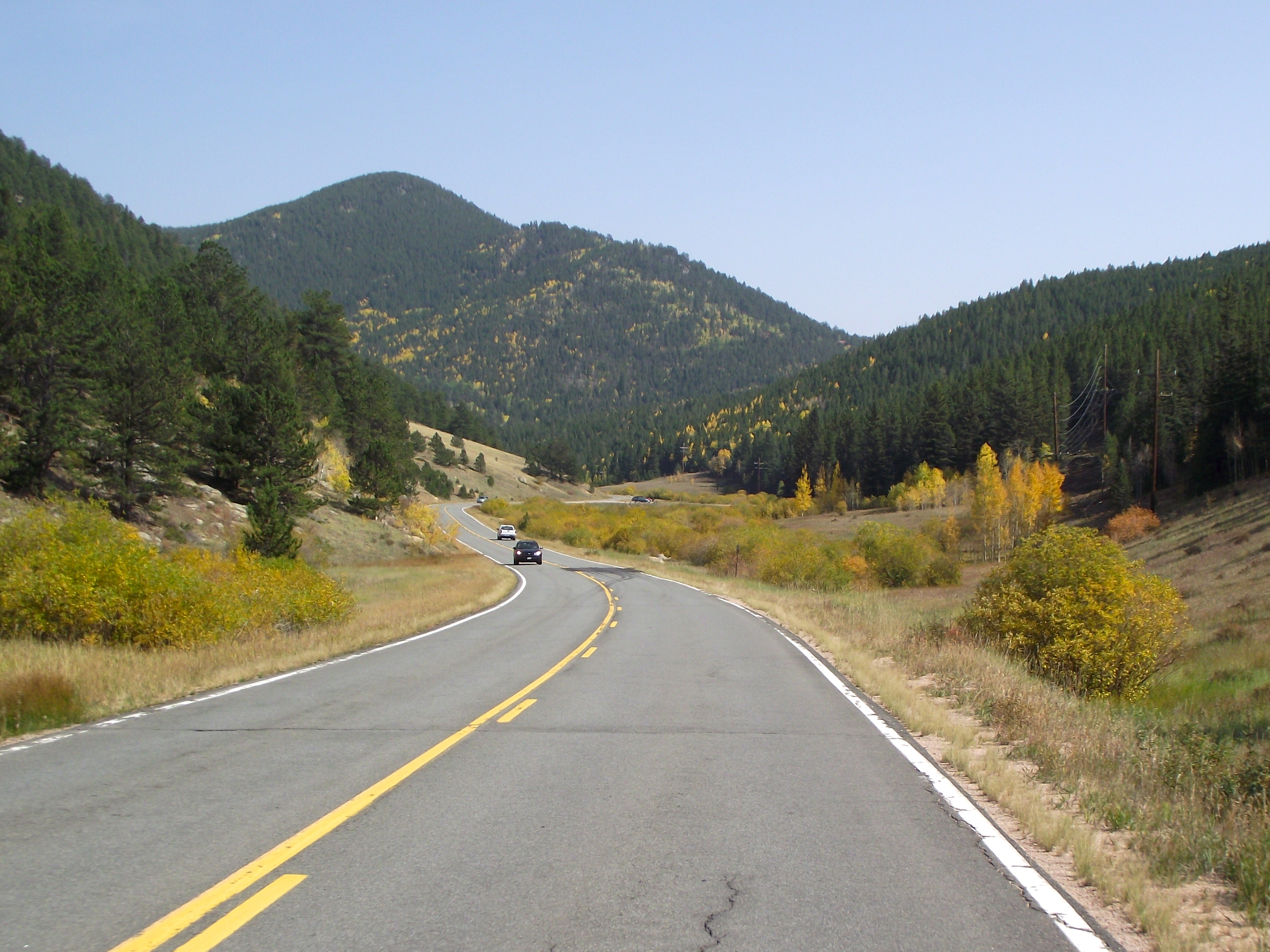
SH 46 in Golden Gate Canyon State Park

State Highway 46 (SH 46) is a state highway in Colorado that connects Golden Gate Canyon State Park to State Highway 119 near Black Hawk.

== Route description ==
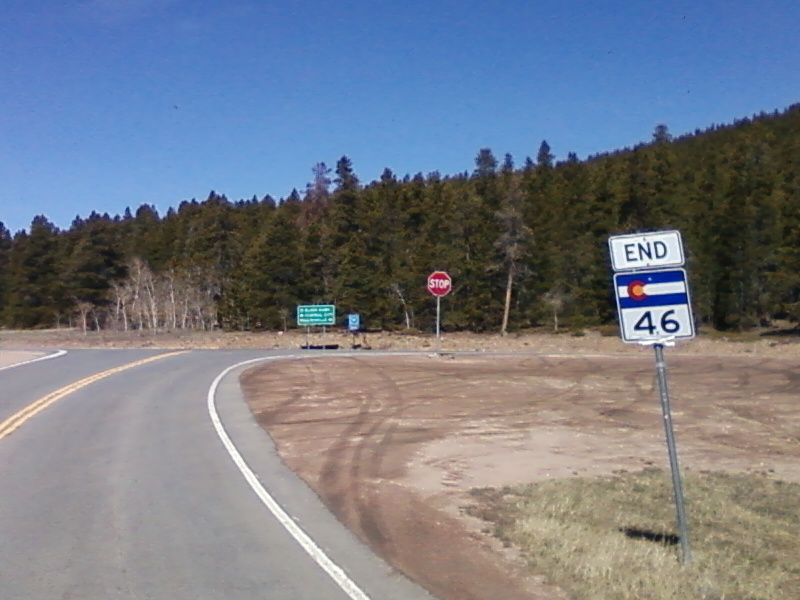
Intersection of SH 46 and SH 119

SH 46 runs 6.6 miles (10.6 km), starting at a junction with SH 119 northwest of Black Hawk. It runs east through Golden Gate Canyon State Park. At the Jefferson County line the state highway ends and the road continues east as Golden Gate Canyon Road (County Road 70) over Golden Gate Pass to SH 93 in northern Golden.

== History ==
SH 46 was formerly part of State Highway 58. As designated in 1912–1914, Primary Road No. 58 connected Central City and Golden, leaving Central City on Gregory Street (former SH 279) and following present SH 119 alongside North Clear Creek. It turned northeast on Smith Hill Road and then, as originally defined, along present Golden Gate Canyon Road (including about 1/2 mile (0.80 km) of modern SH 46) past Guy Hill. Some early maps, however, show the state highway following Crawford Gulch Road significantly north of Guy Hill. By May 1923, the west end had been shifted north to SH 119 north of Central City and Black Hawk, and at about the same time the Golden Gate Canyon Road alignment was permanently adopted. (SH 58 was also extended east from Golden to Denver along what had been Primary Road No. 1, and the number remains to this day on a parallel freeway replacement.) As part of a 1953 reorganization that eliminated a large number of state highways, SH 58 was cut back to its modern Denver-to-Golden extent. Former SH 58 west of Golden Gate Canyon State Park was reacquired in 1972-1973 as a new State Highway 46 and paved in 1974. In 1985-1986 SH 46 was extended east to the county line along already-paved county road, and at the same time Jefferson County completed the paving of its section of Golden Gate Canyon Road.

== Major intersections ==
County	Location	mi	km	Destinations	Notes
Gilpin		0.000	0.000	SH 119 – Black Hawk, Central City, Rollinsville	Western terminus
Jefferson		6.610	10.638	CR 70 (Golden Gate Canyon Road)	Continuation beyond eastern terminus
1.000 mi = 1.609 km; 1.000 km = 0.621 mi
