= Colorado State Highway 119 =

State highway in Colorado, United States

State Highway 119
- SH 119 highlighted in red

Route information
- Maintained by CDOT
- Length: 63.7 mi (102.5 km)

Major junctions
- South end: US 6 in Clear Creek Canyon west of Golden
- SH 72 in Nederland; US 36 / SH 7 in Boulder; SH 52 in Niwot; US 287 in Longmont
- North end: I-25 / US 87 east of Longmont

Location
- Country: United States
- State: Colorado
- Counties: Jefferson, Gilpin, Boulder, Weld

Highway system
- Colorado State Highway System; Interstate; US; State; Scenic
← SH 116	→ SH 120

State Highway 119 (SH 119) is a 63.7-mile-long (102.5 km) state highway in north central Colorado. It extends in a southwest to northeast direction, from a junction with U.S. Route 6 (US 6) in Clear Creek Canyon between Golden and Idaho Springs to a junction with Interstate 25 (I-25) east of Longmont. The southwest portion of the road is a scenic mountain drive providing dramatic vistas of the Front Range, while the northeast portion is a busy interurban thoroughfare. The city of Boulder separates these two vastly different sections of SH 119.

== Route description ==
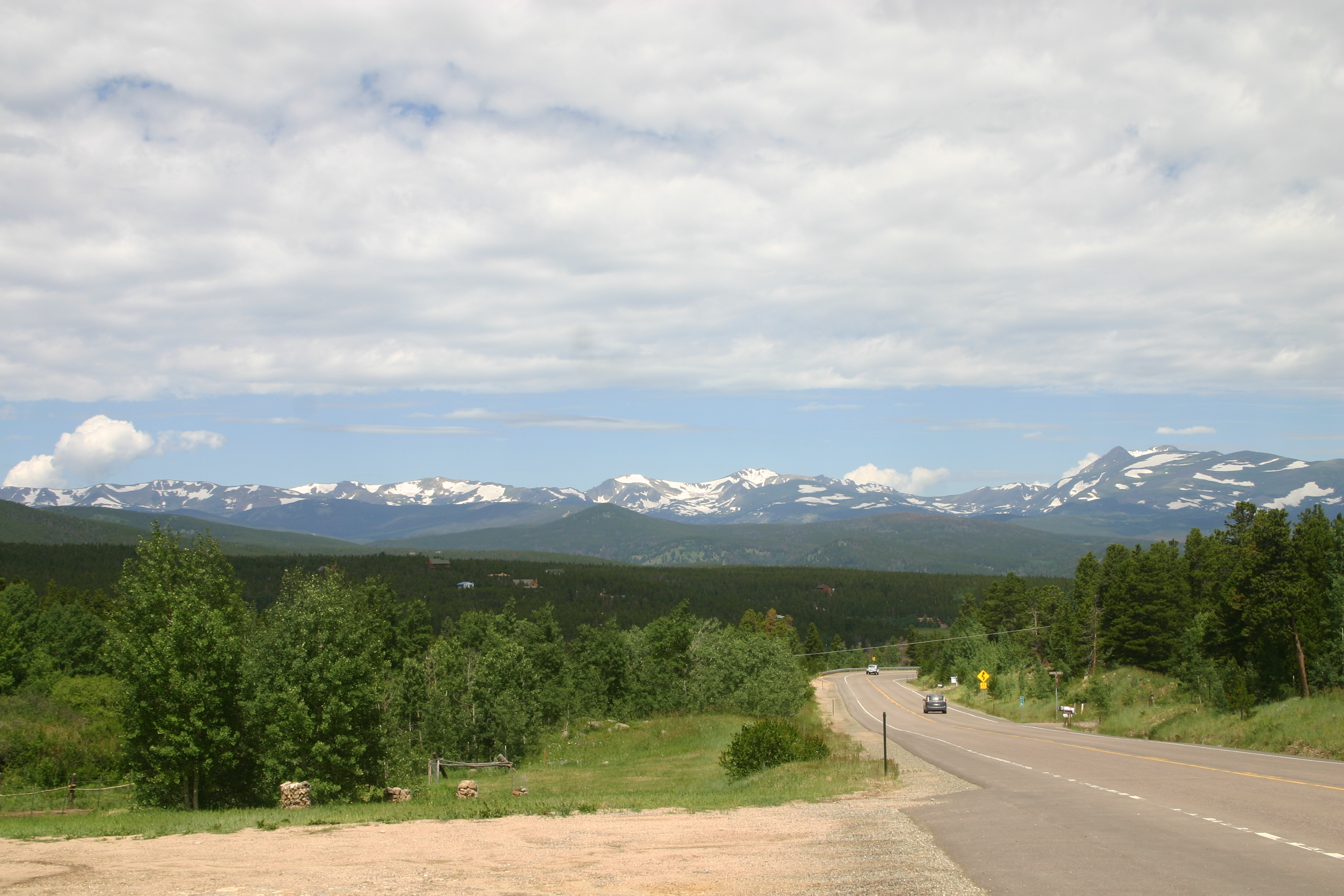
Front Range mountains as seen from northbound State Highway 119, between Black Hawk and Rollinsville

Highway 119 begins at a signalized T intersection with U.S. Highway 6 in Clear Creek Canyon between Golden and Idaho Springs. It then heads north, alongside North Clear Creek, to the gambling town of Black Hawk, Colorado; this section of the road carries heavy traffic to the casinos of Black Hawk and Central City and experiences many accidents.

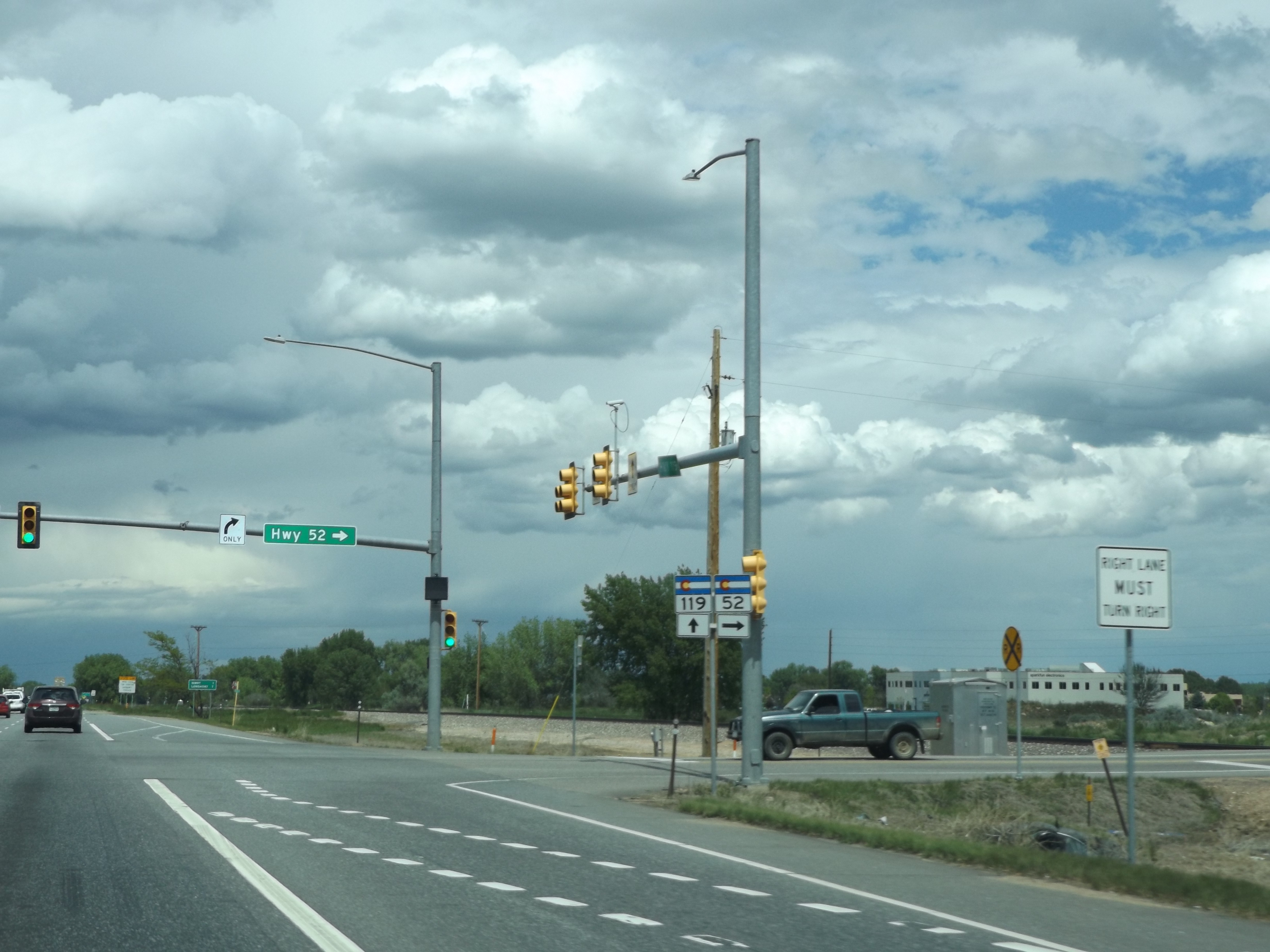
SH 119 at junction with SH 52

It continues north from Black Hawk as the Peak to Peak Scenic and Historic Byway, skirting the western edge of Golden Gate Canyon State Park where it intersects State Highway 46. It continues north through the village of Mid Gilpin to Rollinsville, where it crosses over South Boulder Creek and the tracks of the Union Pacific Railroad, on its way from Denver to the Moffat Tunnel. East Portal Road in Rollinsville provides access to the east portal of the railroad tunnel, and to the Moffat Road historic railroad grade across Rollins Pass. SH 119 continues northward, intersecting State Highway 72 with which it will be concurrent to Nederland. It provides access to the Eldora Mountain Resort ski area, about 3 miles (4.8 km) west of Nederland. In Nederland, SH 119 and SH 72 diverge at a roundabout intersection where SH 72 takes the Peak to Peak Highway designation with it to the north, and Route 119 turns to the east. Leaving Nederland, SH 119 passes along the northern shore of Barker Meadow Reservoir and enters the scenic Boulder Canyon, alongside Boulder Creek. In the canyon, the road experiences grades of up to 10%, which can be dangerous for heavy trucks heading downhill, as it does not have a runaway truck ramp. The walls of the canyon are popular for rock climbing, and the scenic Boulder Falls is an easy walk from the highway.

SH 119 northbound past SH 93 in Boulder

At the mouth of the canyon, SH 119 suddenly enters Boulder as Canyon Boulevard, intersecting State Highway 93 at Broadway, and turning north on 28th Street where it begins concurrency with U.S. Highway 36 and with unsigned State Highway 7. This busy section of State 119 and US 36 on 28th Street serves Boulder's main shopping area. The overlap with US 36 ends at the northern edge of Boulder where US 36 continues north to Rocky Mountain National Park, and SH 119 turns east becoming Diagonal Highway. At an intersection with State Highway 157, SH 119 bends northeast, paralleling the tracks of the Burlington Northern Santa Fe Railway, and becomes an expressway with a very wide median, possibly intended to accommodate a future freeway. At Niwot it passes a very large facility for the IBM Corporation at an intersection with State Highway 52. The Diagonal Highway expressway ends in Longmont, as SH 119 becomes Ken Pratt Blvd. and intersects U.S. Highway 287. East of US 287 in Longmont, a new expressway carries SH 119 directly to its northeastern terminus at a diamond interchange at Interstate 25 exit 240.

== History ==
SH 119 was established in the 1920s, extending from Idaho Springs to Boulder. It went up Virginia Canyon on the aptly named Oh My God Road, and then through Central City to Blackhawk. This section from Idaho Springs to Blackhawk was changed to the present, easier alignment in 1938, with the southern terminus no longer in Idaho Springs but instead at a road junction with US 6 several miles to the east in Clear Creek Canyon. In 1998, the somewhat confusing triangle intersection with US 6 was simplified to a T intersection controlled by a traffic signal, and the west side of the triangle was abandoned and its tunnel boarded up.

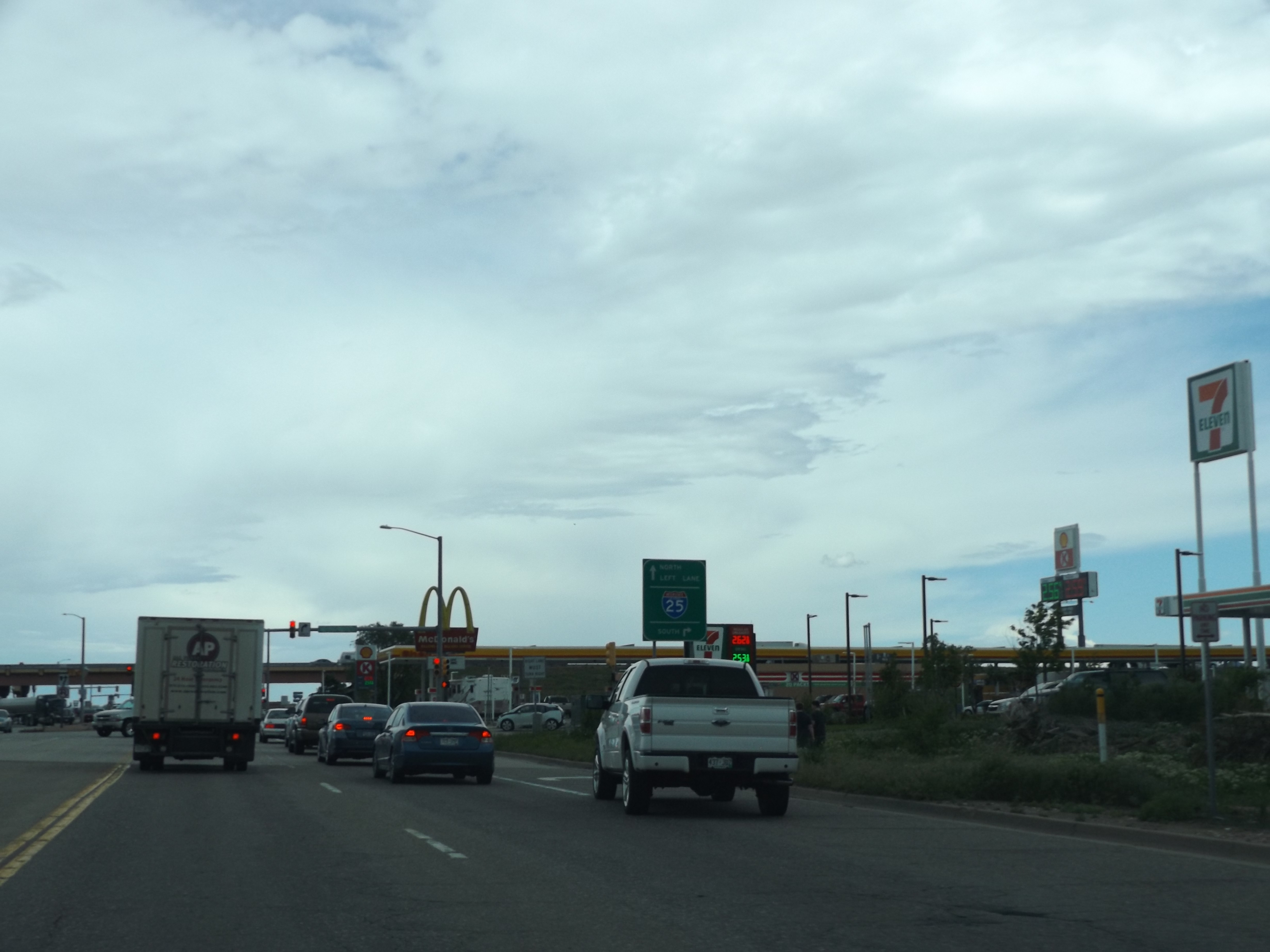
SH 119 approaching its northern terminus

In 1939 SH 119 was extended from Boulder to Longmont, zig-zagging along existing county roads. By 1960 it had been completely paved and straightened on a diagonal route (hence the name "Diagonal Highway") alongside the railroad tracks between Boulder and Longmont. When Interstate 25 was built east of Longmont by 1963, SH 119 was extended by overlapping US 287 to Third Avenue, where it replaced the previous SH 254 to connect to I-25. In 2003, a new expressway alignment for SH 119 was opened in Longmont, connecting directly from its intersection with US 287 to its terminus at I-25, bypassing the previous congested overlap with US 287.

== Future ==
CDOT plans various safety upgrades for the section between US 6 and Blackhawk. A diamond interchange is planned for the very busy intersection with SH 52 to ease the congestion at the large IBM facility.

== Major intersections ==
County	Location	mi	km	Destinations	Notes
Jefferson		0.000	0.000	US 6 to I-70 – Golden, Idaho Springs	Southern terminus
Gilpin	Black Hawk	7.283	11.721	Black Hawk Street – Central City	Former SH 279
Gilpin		12.492	20.104	SH 46 east – Golden Gate Canyon State Park	Western terminus of SH 46
Boulder		22.748	36.609	SH 72 east	South end of SH 72 overlap
Boulder	Nederland	25.754	41.447	SH 72 west / Bridge Street / 2nd Street – Estes Park	North end of SH 72 overlap
Boulder	Boulder	41.892	67.419	SH 93 south (Broadway) – Lyons, Golden	Northern terminus of SH 93
Boulder	Boulder	44.237	71.193	US 36 east / SH 7 south (28th Street)	South end of US 36 overlap
Boulder	Boulder	45.574	73.344	US 36 west (28th Street)	North end of US 36 overlap
Boulder	Boulder	45.766	73.653	SH 157 south (Foothills Parkway)	Northern terminus of SH 157; interchange
Boulder		49.543	79.732	SH 52 east to US 287 – Fort Lupton	Western terminus of SH 52
Boulder	Longmont	56.202	90.448	US 287 (South Main Street) – Fort Collins, Lafayette, Front Range Community College, Museum	
Weld		63.700	102.515	I-25 / US 87	Northern terminus; I-25 exit 240
1.000 mi = 1.609 km; 1.000 km = 0.621 mi
