= Eldora Mountain Resort =

Ski area in Boulder County, Colorado

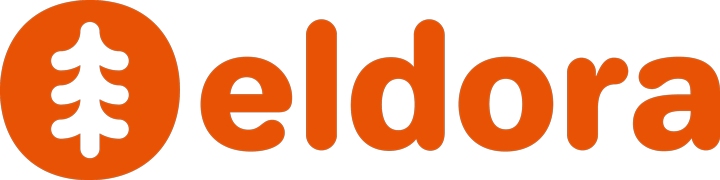

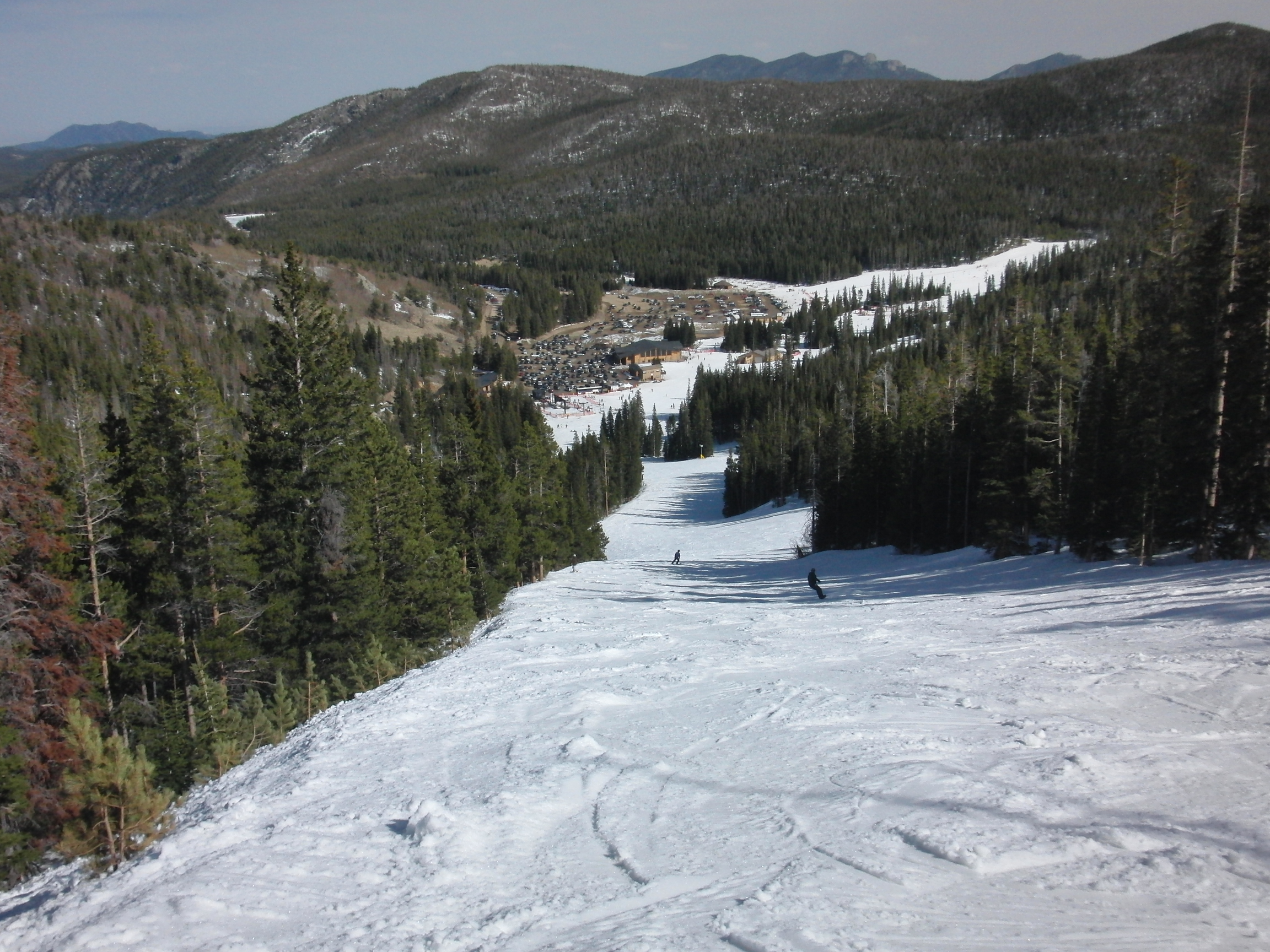
- View of base area from International in 2011

- Location in the United States Location in Colorado
- Location: Boulder County, Colorado, U.S.
- Nearest city: Nederland – 3 mi (5 km); Boulder – 18 mi (29 km)
- Coordinates: 39°56′15″N 105°35′1″W
- Owner: POWDR
- Vertical: 1,240 ft (378 m)
- Top elevation: 10,600 ft (3,231 m)
- Base elevation: 9,360 ft (2,853 m)
- Skiable area: 680 acres (2.8 km^{2})
- Trails: 53 total – 20% easiest – 50% more difficult – 30% most difficult
- Longest run: 3 miles (5 km)
- Lift system: 7 chairlifts – 1 detachable six – 2 quad – 1 triple – 3 double 2 surface lifts
- Terrain parks: 4
- Snowfall: 300 inches (25 ft; 7.6 m)
- Snowmaking: Yes
- Night skiing: No
- Website: eldora.com

Eldora Mountain Resort is a ski area in the Western United States, located in the southwest corner of Boulder County, Colorado, near the unincorporated community of Eldora and three miles (5 km) west of Nederland.

== Location ==
One of only a few Colorado ski resorts on the east side of the continental divide, Eldora sits eighteen miles (29 km) west of Boulder and about fifty miles (80 km) from Downtown Denver. A bus (Route NB), operated by RTD, runs between Boulder and the ski area seven times daily during ski season and serves as easy transportation from town to mountain. Founded 64 years ago in 1962, Eldora is commonly accessed by Colorado State Highway 72 and Colorado State Highway 119. Eldora is unique among most other ski areas near Denver, which are instead served by notoriously busy Interstate 70. This, in addition to its proximity to Denver and Boulder, makes Eldora a popular choice among convenience-seeking skiers.

The summit of the ski area sits at 10,600 feet (3,231 m) above sea level on Bryan Mountain, with a lift-served vertical drop of 1,240 feet (378 m). The slopes face primarily north and east, and the main base area is at 9,360 feet (2,853 m).

The resort caters mostly to day skiers and snowboarders, though some overnight accommodations are available in Nederland, and many hotel rooms are available in Boulder. In addition to alpine skiing, the Eldora Nordic Center also includes 25 miles (40 km) of cross-country skiing and snowshoeing trails, as well as rentals, lessons, and packages.

Though Eldora is small in area compared to some of the bigger resorts in Colorado, the terrain variety is well-known and challenging. There are beginner-friendly trails located on Little Hawk Mountain, intermediate and advanced trails on Challenge Mountain through Indian Peaks, and expert terrain is found in Corona Bowl and on the West Ridge trail, which varies from 45 to 70% slope. Given its location near the Continental Divide, Eldora occasionally sees powerful wind; for example, the area was shut down for most of its operating hours during one day in late 2019 due to hurricane-force winds.

After a brief campaign to solicit patron feedback in 2010, an updated master plan was published for 2011. Among the main objectives listed are lift replacements and additions, as well as terrain improvements.

== History ==
Eldora was first conceived in 1961 when four men purchased a 400-acre parcel of land from the United States Forest Service near Nederland. This land consists of the base-area lodge and the parking lot. A road from Nederland was constructed the following year, along with two T-bars. To stay competitive with many of the other front-range ski areas (all of which are now defunct, with the exception of Squaw Pass, since renamed Echo Mountain Park), a lodge was erected and the road was regraded. The resort installed its first chairlift, Little Hawk, in 1967. The lift, which was constructed by Miner-Denver, still runs today and is the oldest operating chairlift in Colorado.

In 1973, two more double chairlifts were installed: Cannonball, which paralleled the T-bar on the main mountain, and Corona, which opened a new area to the north. An additional two double chairlifts, Caribou and Sundance, were constructed by Lift Engineering in the late 1970s, on the beginner hill.

Beginning in 1979, the resort started losing money, in part because the construction of the Eisenhower Tunnel on Interstate 70 made it more convenient to reach the larger ski areas west of the Continental Divide. The resort stayed open until 1986, when it closed from the 1986–1987 season because of ownership issues. When the resort reopened the following season, the new management included the former president of Copper Mountain (Colorado).

In 1989, the Corona Bowl, which had been left abandoned for years, reopened. The bowl was named after an alternative name for Rollins Pass, the mountain pass used by the Denver and Salt Lake Railway to traverse the Continental Divide from 1904 to 1928 prior to the opening of the Moffat Tunnel. The right-of-way for the Rollins Pass route can be seen from the top of Corona.

In 1992, Challenge, a triple chairlift purchased from Sun Valley in Idaho, was installed parallel to Cannonball. Two fixed-grip quad chairs were installed in 1998: one, which replaced the original Corona lift, and another one just east of it, Indian Peaks, which opened 150 new acres of terrain.

In 2013, it was announced that Eldora Mountain Resort would be added to Vail Resorts' Epic Pass for the 2013–2014 season.

In 2014, it was announced that Eldora Mountain Resort would leave the Vail Resorts' Epic Pass and join Winter Park & Copper Mountain's Rocky Mountain Super Pass Plus for the 2014–2015 year.

In 2016, it was announced that Powdr Corporation had acquired Eldora Mountain Resort and rebranded their terrain park as a Woodward facility.

For the 2017/2018 season, Eldora Mountain Resort installed the Alpenglow chairlift, a new high-speed detachable six-person chairlift.

The resort started the 2018/2019 ski season on Wednesday, November 7, its earliest opening day in more than two decades (and roughly 12 days earlier than the average opening day since 2010).

In late 2019, Eldora submitted plans to add to its 1,600 parking spaces an additional 800 spaces, expanding an existing lot and creating a new one.

In mid-March 2020, with the 2020 COVID-19 coronavirus deemed a pandemic, Eldora discontinued free RTD tickets as well as the free shuttle bus for the rest of the season and canceled events and live music through the end of the month.

With increasing climate change impacts, in December 2023, Eldora started looking into water sources for expanded snowmaking capabilities.

In August 2024, POWDR announced that Eldora was for sale. A few months later, in mid-November, the neighboring small town of Nederland announced its interest in purchasing the resort for an estimated $100–200M. In July 2025, Nederland announced it would issue municipal revenue bonds backed by the resort's earnings to finance the purchase. After initial reports that the deal would close in December 2025, the Nederland Board of Trustees voted on January 6, 2026 to approve the ski resort purchase, with expected regulatory approvals continuing into 2026 before final purchase execution.
