= Colorado State Highway 93 =

State highway in Colorado connecting Golden and Boulder

State Highway 93
- SH 93 highlighted in red

Route information
- Maintained by CDOT
- Length: 18.849 mi (30.335 km)

Major junctions
- South end: US 6 / SH 58 in Golden
- North end: SH 119 in Boulder

Location
- Country: United States
- State: Colorado
- Counties: Jefferson, Boulder

Highway system
- Colorado State Highway System; Interstate; US; State; Scenic
← SH 92	→ SH 94

State Highway 93 (SH 93) is a state highway in Colorado that connects Golden and Boulder. SH 93's southern terminus is at U.S. Route 6 (US 6) and SH 58 in Golden, and the northern terminus is at SH 119 in Boulder.

== Route description ==
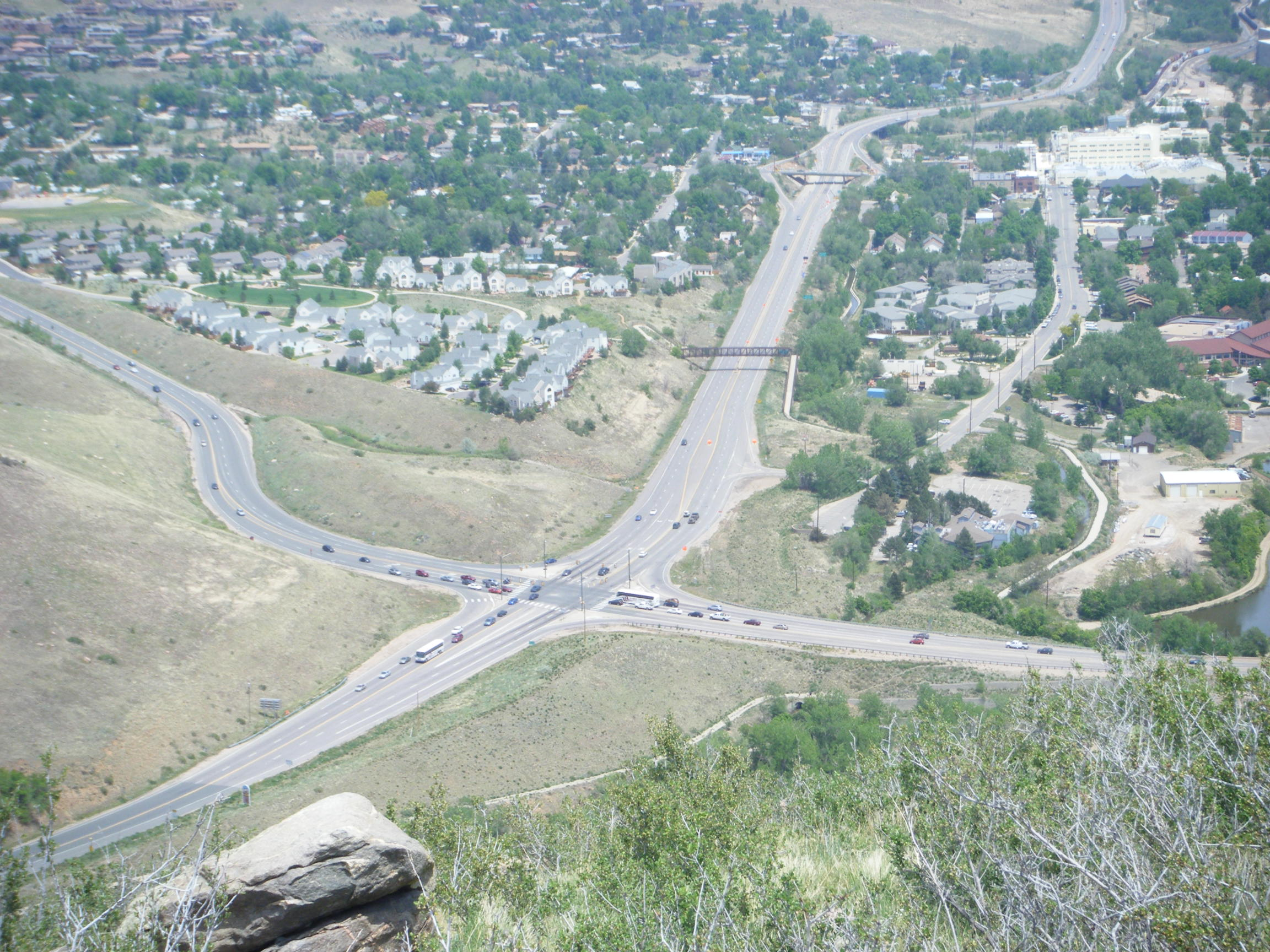
Intersection of SH 93, SH 58 and US 6 in Golden as seen from Mount Zion

SH 93 runs 18.8 miles (30.3 km), starting at its southern junction with US 6 and SH 58 at the entrance to Clear Creek Canyon in Golden. It runs north, just east of the mountains, ending at a junction with SH 119 in central Boulder.

== Major intersections ==
County	Location	mi	km	Destinations	Notes
Jefferson	Golden	0.000	0.000	US 6 / SH 58 east to SH 119 – Denver, Idaho Springs, Black Hawk, Central City	Southern terminus, western terminus of SH 58
Jefferson	Arvada	7.573	12.188	SH 72 – Pinecliffe, Arvada	
Boulder		11.781	18.960	SH 128 east – Broomfield, Rocky Mountain Metro Airport	Western terminus of SH 128
Boulder		13.632	21.939	SH 170 to US 36 – Eldorado Springs, Marshall, Eldorado Canyon State Park	
Boulder	Boulder	17.422	28.038	Baseline Road (SH 36E east)	
Boulder	Boulder	18.849	30.335	SH 119 (Canyon Boulevard) to SH 7 – Lyons, Nederland, Lafayette	Northern terminus
1.000 mi = 1.609 km; 1.000 km = 0.621 mi
