= Wondervu, Colorado =

Unincorporated community in Colorado, USA

Coordinates: 39°55′32″N 105°23′42″W

Wondervu (/ˈwʌndərvjuː/ WUN-dər-VYOO) is an unincorporated community in Boulder and Gilpin counties in the U.S. state of Colorado. It lies within a valley known as Coal Creek Canyon and is a part of the larger census-designated place of Coal Creek. The settlement was developed in the late 1920s and the early 1930s by the prominent Denver lawyer Otto Friedrichs as a vacation community for the working class.

All businesses and homes in the village have a Golden ZIP Code. Businesses in Wondervu include the Wondervu Café.

The welcome sign for the village of Wondervu is near the junction of Coal Creek Canyon Road and Ramona Road.
