= Rollinsville, Colorado =

Census-designated place in Gilpin County, CO, USA

- Census-designated place
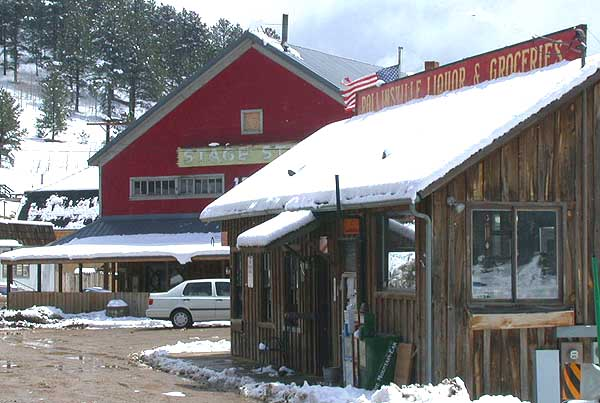
- Businesses along State Highway 119 in Rollinsville, April 2005

- Location of the Rollinsville CDP in Gilpin County, Colorado
- Coordinates: 39°55′13″N 105°30′05″W
- Country: United States
- State: Colorado
- County: Gilpin County

Government
  - Type: unincorporated town

Area
  - Total: 1.412 sq mi (3.658 km^{2})
  - Land: 1.412 sq mi (3.658 km^{2})
  - Water: 0 sq mi (0.000 km^{2})
- Elevation: 8,668 ft (2,642 m)

Population (2020)
  - Total: 194
  - Density: 137/sq mi (53.0/km^{2})
- Time zone: UTC-7 (MST)
  - Summer (DST): UTC-6 (MDT)
- ZIP Code: 80474
- Area codes: 303 & 720
- GNIS feature ID: 2583288

Rollinsville is a census-designated place (CDP) and post office in and governed by Gilpin County, Colorado, United States. The CDP is a part of the Denver–Aurora–Lakewood, CO Metropolitan Statistical Area. The Rollinsville post office has the ZIP Code 80474 (post office boxes). At the United States Census 2020, the population of the Rollinsville CDP was 194.

== History ==
The Rollinsville Post Office has been in operation since 1871. The community was named for John Q. A. Rollins, a prominent mining executive in Gilpin County in the 1860s and 1870s.

== Geography ==
Rollinsville is located in the mountains southwest of the city of Boulder, on the flank of a hill above South Boulder Creek along State Highway 119 between Nederland and Black Hawk. It consists of a small cluster of residences and several businesses at the terminus of the road leading westward up to Rollins Pass at the summit of the Front Range.

The South Boulder Creek flows just south of the town. The creek follows the railroad tracks into a small canyon and emerges near the Boulder/Gilpin county border before flowing through Pinecliffe.

The Rollinsville CDP has an area of 904 acres (3.658 km^{2}), all land.

=== Climate ===
Pickle Gulch (RAWS) and Rollinsville 1.1 SSW (CoCoRaHS) are weather stations located around Rollinsville with temperature and precipitation data, respectively. Pickle Gulch has a humid continental climate (Köppen Dfb), bordering on a subalpine climate (Köppen Dfc).

Climate data for Pickle Gulch (RAWS), Colorado, 2001–2020 normals: 9380ft (2859m)
Month	Jan	Feb	Mar	Apr	May	Jun	Jul	Aug	Sep	Oct	Nov	Dec	Year
Record high °F (°C)	60 (16)	60 (16)	67 (19)	68 (20)	78 (26)	87 (31)	88 (31)	88 (31)	84 (29)	74 (23)	68 (20)	59 (15)	88 (31)
Mean maximum °F (°C)	52.3 (11.3)	52.5 (11.4)	58.4 (14.7)	63.7 (17.6)	72.4 (22.4)	80.5 (26.9)	83.1 (28.4)	80.4 (26.9)	76.9 (24.9)	69.0 (20.6)	60.1 (15.6)	52.1 (11.2)	84.4 (29.1)
Mean daily maximum °F (°C)	35.3 (1.8)	35.5 (1.9)	42.8 (6.0)	48.3 (9.1)	56.3 (13.5)	68.8 (20.4)	74.1 (23.4)	71.6 (22.0)	66.0 (18.9)	53.0 (11.7)	43.7 (6.5)	35.4 (1.9)	52.6 (11.4)
Daily mean °F (°C)	26.7 (−2.9)	25.5 (−3.6)	32.4 (0.2)	37.8 (3.2)	46.1 (7.8)	56.9 (13.8)	62.4 (16.9)	60.0 (15.6)	54.3 (12.4)	42.4 (5.8)	34.1 (1.2)	26.6 (−3.0)	42.1 (5.6)
Mean daily minimum °F (°C)	18.0 (−7.8)	15.4 (−9.2)	21.9 (−5.6)	27.2 (−2.7)	34.6 (1.4)	45.0 (7.2)	50.7 (10.4)	48.5 (9.2)	42.5 (5.8)	31.7 (−0.2)	24.4 (−4.2)	17.6 (−8.0)	31.5 (−0.3)
Mean minimum °F (°C)	−0.9 (−18.3)	−6.2 (−21.2)	3.5 (−15.8)	10.9 (−11.7)	22.0 (−5.6)	33.2 (0.7)	42.3 (5.7)	38.6 (3.7)	28.6 (−1.9)	13.5 (−10.3)	3.4 (−15.9)	−2.8 (−19.3)	−11.6 (−24.2)
Record low °F (°C)	−13 (−25)	−28 (−33)	−13 (−25)	1 (−17)	13 (−11)	27 (−3)	37 (3)	32 (0)	19 (−7)	−10 (−23)	−16 (−27)	−20 (−29)	−28 (−33)
Average precipitation inches (mm)	1.12 (28)	1.51 (38)	2.12 (54)	2.41 (61)	3.60 (91)	1.74 (44)	3.16 (80)	2.42 (61)	1.68 (43)	1.25 (32)	1.03 (26)	1.08 (27)	23.12 (585)
Average snowfall inches (cm)	12.6 (32)	16.4 (42)	22.0 (56)	23.4 (59)	14.7 (37)	0.6 (1.5)	0.0 (0.0)	0.0 (0.0)	0.5 (1.3)	10.7 (27)	11.8 (30)	12.0 (30)	124.7 (315.8)
Source: XMACIS2 (Cascade normals & Rollinsville 1.1 2013-2023 snowfall)

== Demographics ==
Rollinsville CDP, Colorado
Year	Pop.	±%
2010	181	—
2020	194	+7.2%
Source: United States Census Bureau

The United States Census Bureau initially defined the Rollinsville CDP for the United States Census 2010.

== See also ==
- Peak to Peak Highway
- Roosevelt National Forest
