= Caribou Ranch Open Space Park =

Park in Colorado, United States

Coordinates: 40°0′9″N 105°32′40″W

Caribou Ranch Open Space Park is a park located near Nederland, Colorado. It has over 3.14 miles of trail for recreational visitors. It is open to hikers, horseback riders, and trail runners. Mountain bikes and dogs are not allowed in the park area. This park is connected to Mud Lake Open Space Park by the Caribou Ranch Link. Caribou Ranch is closed April 1 through June 30 to protect spring migratory birds and elk calving and rearing.

== History ==
The park is currently managed by Boulder County Parks and Open Space. Like many areas in Colorado, it was first occupied by nomadic Native American Tribes. In the late 1800s, the mining industry moved in and established the area. The Blue Bird Mine Complex was a silver mine from that era and can still be seen in the park today. During the summer, recreational visitors would visit the area via the railroad. In the 1930s, the area was used to breed Arabian horses by Lynn W. Van Vleet. Then in 1971, the land was purchased and one of the barns was converted into the Caribou Ranch recording studio.

== Wildlife ==
Caribou Ranch Open Space hosts many species of wildlife including elk, migratory birds, black bear, mountain lion, coyote, mule deer, bobcat, bat, moose, beaver, and short tailed weasel.
