= Nederland, Colorado =

Town in Colorado, United States

Town of Nederland
- Town
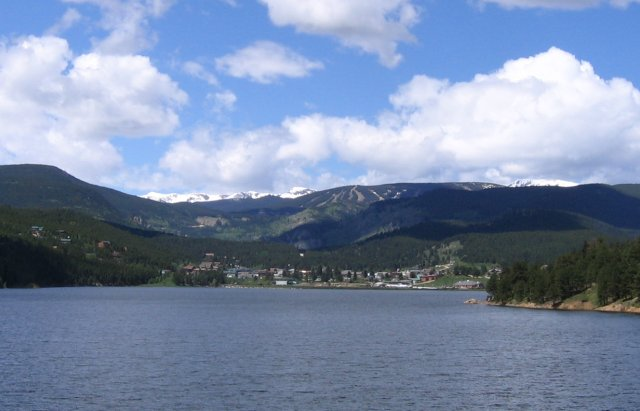
- Motto: "Life Is Better Up Here"
- Location of Nederland in Boulder County, Colorado.
- Coordinates: 39°57′43″N 105°30′05″W
- Country: United States
- State: Colorado
- County: Boulder County
- Incorporated (town): November 15, 1885

Government
  - Type: Statutory Town
  - Mayor: Billy Giblin

Area
  - Total: 1.55 sq mi (4.01 km^{2})
  - Land: 1.48 sq mi (3.83 km^{2})
  - Water: 0.069 sq mi (0.18 km^{2})
- Elevation: 8,235 ft (2,510 m)

Population (2020)
  - Total: 1,471
  - Density: 1,000/sq mi (400/km^{2})
- Time zone: UTC-7 (MST)
  - Summer (DST): UTC-6 (MDT)
- ZIP code: 80466
- Area code: 303
- FIPS code: 08-53175
- GNIS feature ID: 2413037
- Website: townofnederland.colorado.gov

Nederland (/ˈnɛdərlənd/, NED-ər-lənd) is a statutory town located near Barker Meadow Reservoir in the foothills of southwest Boulder County, Colorado, United States. As of the 2020 United States census it had a population of 1,471.

== History ==
Nederland was established in 1874. The town started as a trading post between Ute Indians and European settlers during the 1850s. The town's first economic boom came when minerals such as tungsten, silver, and gold were discovered near Tungsten (east of Nederland), Caribou (northwest of Nederland, 1859), and Eldora (west of Nederland, 1875).

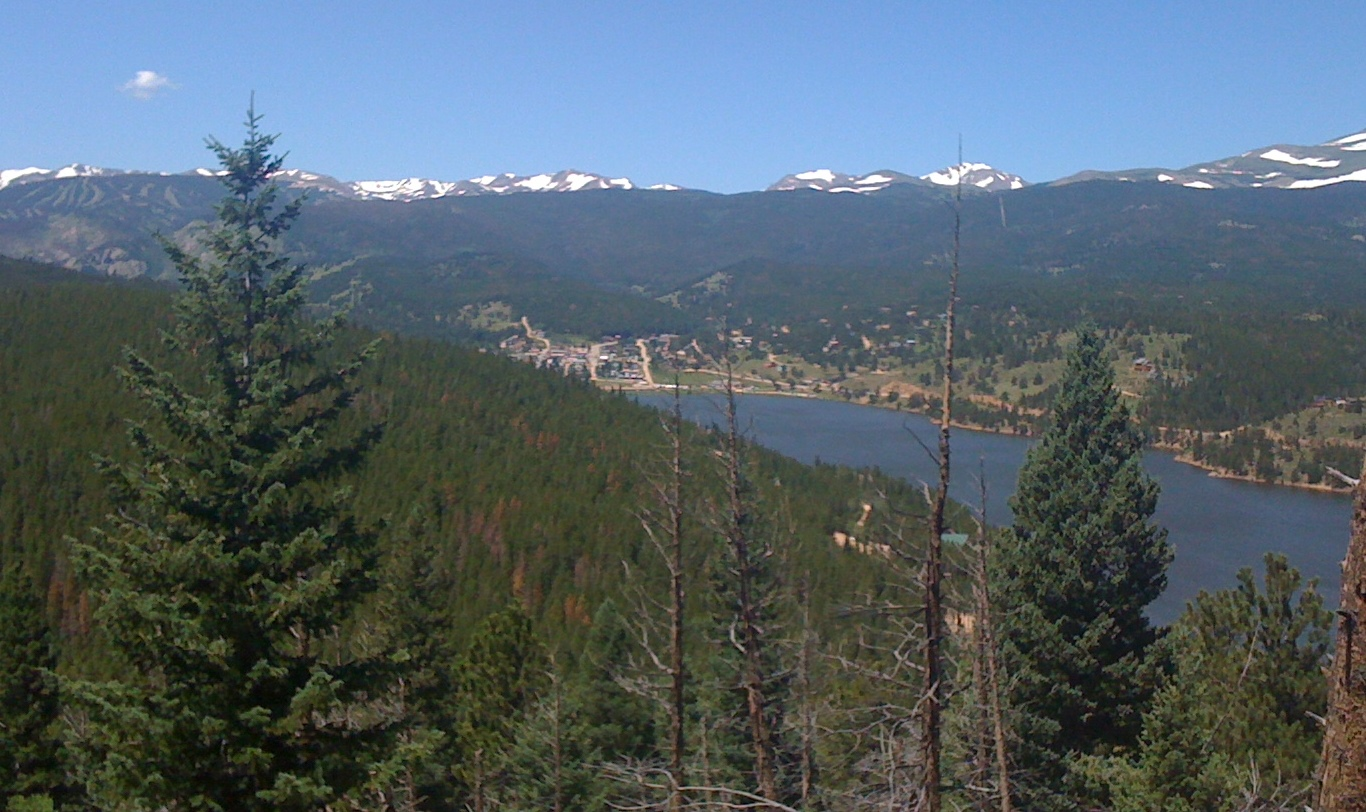
Barker Reservoir

Today Nederland is better known as a gateway to outdoor recreation in the nearby Indian Peaks Wilderness, Rocky Mountain National Park, Roosevelt National Forest, and the recently established James Peak Wilderness. Nederland is located 17 miles (27 km) west of Boulder, 41 miles (66 km) south of Estes Park, and 47 miles (76 km) northwest of Denver at the Junction of SH 119 and SH 72 on the Peak to Peak Highway.

The nearby Eldora Mountain Resort ski area has been a draw for locals since 1961. In 2024, when Eldora owner, PWDR Corporation, announced it was selling off various properties nationwide, including Eldora, Nederland explored the idea of purchasing the operation for $120 million. After considerable financial discussions, community input and planning, the sale was completed in January 2026. The transition of ownership from POWDR to Nederland is expected to take upward of two years. When completed, Eldora's employees will become employees of the town.

=== Name origin ===
In the mid-19th century the first homesteaders gave a variety of names to the area. The town was first called Dayton, then Browns Crossing. In 1871, when the US Postal Service first set up an office, the name was changed to Middle Boulder after the creek that flows through the center of town (and continues eastward to become Boulder Creek).

In 1873 the Caribou Mine, at an elevation of roughly 10,000 feet (3,000 m) and 6 miles (10 km) northwest of the town, was sold to the Mining Company Nederland from the Netherlands. The high elevation meant fierce winds and deep winter snow, so the new owners of the mine decided that it was beneficial to bring ore from Caribou down to Middle Boulder for milling. In the Dutch language, Nederland ("Netherlands" in English) means low land, and based on casual usage by the Dutch miners, Middle Boulder came to be known as Nederland. In 1874 the town was incorporated and adopted Nederland as the official name.

== Geography ==
Nederland is located in southwest Boulder County. Due west from the town is the Indian Peaks Wilderness within Roosevelt National Forest. The Continental Divide passes through the Wilderness 8 miles (13 km) west of Nederland.

The town of Nederland has a total area of 1.6 square miles (4.1 km^{2}), of which 1.5 square miles (3.9 km^{2}) is land and 0.077 square miles (0.2 km^{2}), or 4.29%, is water, consisting primarily of the west end of Barker Reservoir on Middle Boulder Creek.

=== Climate ===
Nederland has an alpine subarctic climate (Dfc) due to its high altitude. Summer days are warm but nights are cool and frost is possible even in mid-summer. Snowfall is possible most of the year.

Climate data for Nederland, Colorado (1970-1988)
Month	Jan	Feb	Mar	Apr	May	Jun	Jul	Aug	Sep	Oct	Nov	Dec	Year
Record high °F (°C)	65 (18)	61 (16)	65 (18)	71 (22)	78 (26)	86 (30)	87 (31)	89 (32)	82 (28)	79 (26)	70 (21)	64 (18)	89 (32)
Mean daily maximum °F (°C)	34.9 (1.6)	37.8 (3.2)	41.8 (5.4)	49.2 (9.6)	57.5 (14.2)	69.1 (20.6)	75.2 (24.0)	73.3 (22.9)	65.3 (18.5)	55.2 (12.9)	43.1 (6.2)	37.1 (2.8)	53.2 (11.8)
Mean daily minimum °F (°C)	10.2 (−12.1)	12.9 (−10.6)	16.7 (−8.5)	22.7 (−5.2)	29.3 (−1.5)	37.1 (2.8)	42.6 (5.9)	41.2 (5.1)	33.8 (1.0)	25.3 (−3.7)	17.5 (−8.1)	12.5 (−10.8)	25.2 (−3.8)
Record low °F (°C)	−30 (−34)	−30 (−34)	−30 (−34)	−10 (−23)	6 (−14)	14 (−10)	27 (−3)	19 (−7)	3 (−16)	−2 (−19)	−25 (−32)	−34 (−37)	−34 (−37)
Average precipitation inches (mm)	0.54 (14)	0.59 (15)	1.29 (33)	2.18 (55)	2.69 (68)	1.67 (42)	2.39 (61)	2.01 (51)	1.74 (44)	1.02 (26)	1.12 (28)	0.73 (19)	17.97 (456)
Average snowfall inches (cm)	13.3 (34)	13.1 (33)	23.9 (61)	24.3 (62)	12.2 (31)	1.8 (4.6)	0.0 (0.0)	0.0 (0.0)	5.2 (13)	9.3 (24)	19.9 (51)	16.1 (41)	139.0 (353)
Average precipitation days	6	5	7	8	11	8	14	12	8	6	7	5	98
Source: WRCC

Nederland, CO

Climate chart (precipitation, max. and min. temperature)
J	F	M	A	M	J	J	A	S	O	N	D
0.5 35 10	0.6 38 13	1.3 42 17	2.2 49 23	2.7 58 29	1.7 69 37	2.4 75 43	2 73 41	1.7 65 34	1 55 25	1.1 43 18	0.7 37 13
- █ Average max. and min. temperatures in °F
- █ Precipitation totals in inches
Metric conversion
J	F	M	A	M	J	J	A	S	O	N	D
14 2 −12	15 3 −11	33 5 −9	55 10 −5	68 14 −2	42 21 3	61 24 6	51 23 5	44 19 1	26 13 −4	28 6 −8	19 3 −11
- █ Average max. and min. temperatures in °C
- █ Precipitation totals in mm

== Demographics ==
Historical population
Census	Pop.	Note	%±
1880	279		—
1910	446		—
1920	291		−34.8%
1930	285		−2.1%
1940	384		34.7%
1950	266		−30.7%
1960	272		2.3%
1970	492		80.9%
1980	1,212		146.3%
1990	1,099		−9.3%
2000	1,394		26.8%
2010	1,445		3.7%
2020	1,471		1.8%
U.S. Decennial Census

=== 2020 census ===
As of the 2020 census, Nederland had a population of 1,471. The median age was 43.2 years. 15.1% of residents were under the age of 18 and 13.7% of residents were 65 years of age or older. For every 100 females there were 115.7 males, and for every 100 females age 18 and over there were 117.2 males age 18 and over.

0.0% of residents lived in urban areas, while 100.0% lived in rural areas.

There were 673 households in Nederland, of which 24.8% had children under the age of 18 living in them. Of all households, 46.2% were married-couple households, 26.9% were households with a male householder and no spouse or partner present, and 18.6% were households with a female householder and no spouse or partner present. About 29.8% of all households were made up of individuals and 7.9% had someone living alone who was 65 years of age or older.

There were 764 housing units, of which 11.9% were vacant. The homeowner vacancy rate was 2.5% and the rental vacancy rate was 6.5%.

Racial composition as of the 2020 census
Race	Number	Percent
White	1,317	89.5%
Black or African American	2	0.1%
American Indian and Alaska Native	4	0.3%
Asian	21	1.4%
Native Hawaiian and Other Pacific Islander	1	0.1%
Some other race	18	1.2%
Two or more races	108	7.3%
Hispanic or Latino (of any race)	59	4.0%

=== 2010 census ===
As of the census of 2010, there were 1,445 people, 657 households, and 349 families residing in the town. The population density was 954 inhabitants per square mile (368/km^{2}). There were 749 housing units at an average density of 499.3 units per square mile (192.8 units/km^{2}). The racial makeup of the town was 95.5% White, 0.4% African American, 0.7% Native American, 0.8% Asian, 0.9% some other race, and 1.7% from two or more races. Hispanic or Latino of any race were 4.1% of the population.

There were 657 households, of which 28.5% had children under the age of 18, 41.7% were headed by married couples living together, and 46.9% were non-families. Of all households, 32.6% were made up of individuals, and 4.0% were someone living alone who was 65 years of age or older. The average household size was 2.19, and the average family size was 2.77.

In the town, the population was spread out, with 19.8% under the age of 18, 7.9% from 18 to 24, 34.5% from 25 to 44, 32.0% from 45 to 64, and 5.9% being 65 years of age or older. The median age was 39.5 years. For every 100 females, there were 107.6 males. For every 100 females age 18 and over there were 112.7 males.

=== Income and poverty ===
For the period 2007–2011, the estimated median income for a household in the town was $69,638, and the median income for a family was $90,329. Male full-time workers had a median income of $60,526 versus $65,052 for females. The per capita income for the town was $31,730. About 7.0% of families and 12.7% of the population were below the poverty line. The median house or condo value in between 2007 and 2011 was estimated at $329,600.

== Business ==
The center of town contains various retail businesses, services, lodging and government. Downtown Nederland shops are popular with out-of-town tourists. Attractions include the Carousel of Happiness.

Early on Thursday morning, October 9, 2025, a major fire destroyed the Caribou Village Shopping Center, a 2-story structure of about two dozen businesses. For a time, residents were ordered to evacuate the surrounding area. Among the offices lost in the Lakeview Fire are the Wild Bear Nature Center, Brightwood Music, a medical clinic and laundry, as well as the Boulder County Sheriff’s station.

== Arts and culture ==
=== Annual cultural events ===
Nederland hosts several major events every year, including the diverse NedFest (Nederland Music & Arts Festival), the historical Miners Day celebration, and the annual Frozen Dead Guy Days festival, all next to Barker Meadow Reservoir.

Frozen Dead Guy Days, which occurs every year in early March, commemorates a substandard attempt by Norwegian immigrant Trygve Bauge to practice cryonics on Bredo Morstoel, his deceased grandfather. In addition to extensive local press, The New York Times covered the festival in 2011 and 2012.

== Notable people ==
- Kathy Butler, Olympian runner for Great Britain and Canada
- Timothy Duggan, road bicycle racer
- Ian MacGregor, road bicycle racer
- Rob Savoye, primary developer of Gnash software
- Ann Trombley, Olympic cyclist
- David Wilcock, American Paranormal Author, star of Ancient Aliens

== Legalization of marijuana ==
On Tuesday, April 6, 2010, Nederland became the third community in Colorado (after Denver and Breckenridge) to legalize the sale, purchase, possession, consumption, and transportation, cultivation, manufacturing, dispensing of medical marijuana and its concentrates and related paraphernalia for persons 21 years of age and older.

== See also ==
- Caribou Ranch
- Caribou Ranch Open Space Park
- Roosevelt National Forest
