= Longmont Museum & Cultural Center =

Museum in Longmont, Colorado

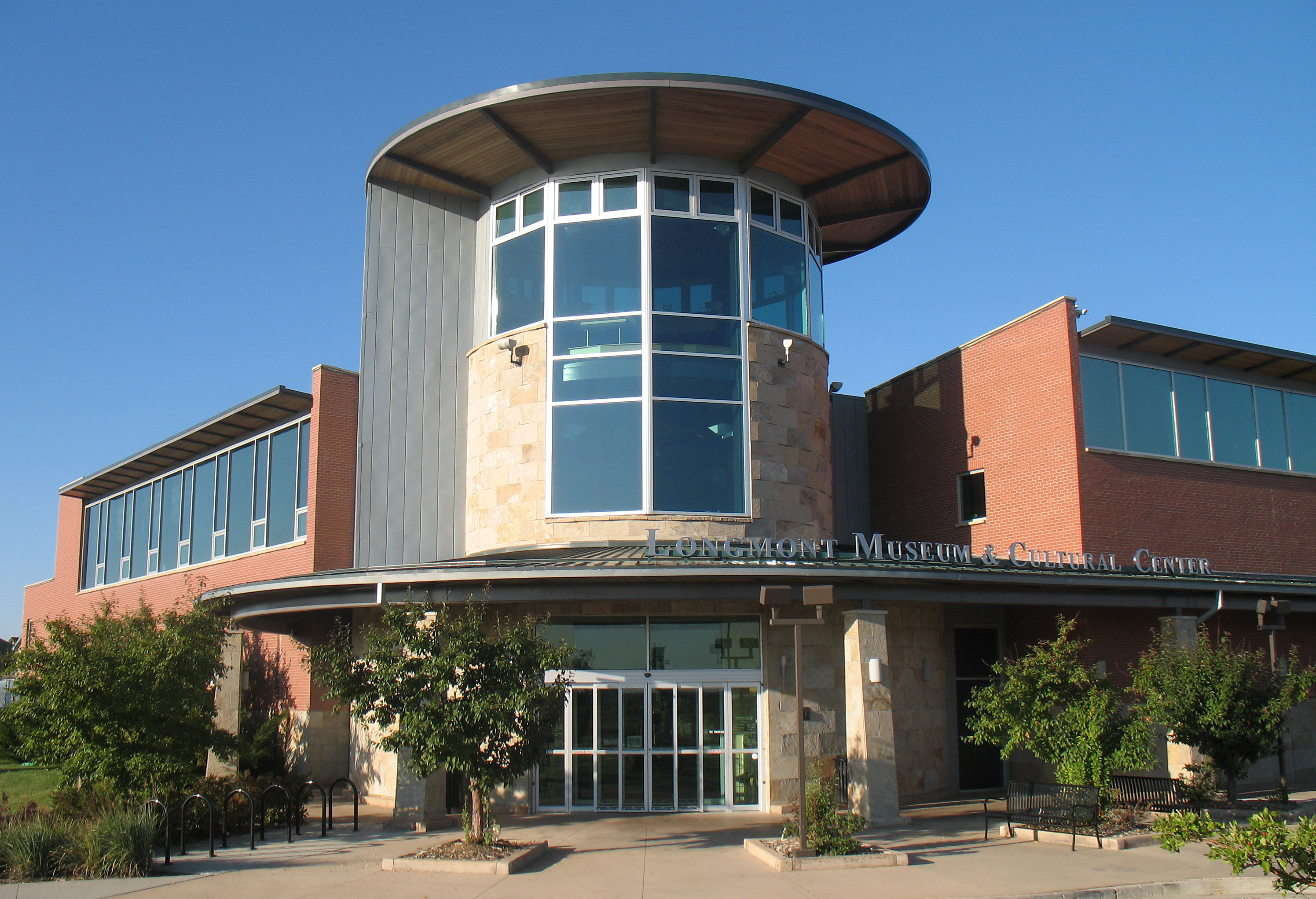
- Established: 1936
- Location: 400 Quail Road; Longmont, Colorado (United States)
- Coordinates: 40.1457°N 105.099°W
- Type: History museum
- Website: longmontcolorado.gov/museum

The Longmont Museum & Cultural Center is a municipally-funded museum in Longmont, Colorado. It collects and interprets the history and culture of the St. Vrain Valley in northern Colorado.

== History ==
The museum was founded in 1936 as part of the St. Vrain Historical Society. In 1940, the museum opened to the public with exhibits in the carriage house at the Callahan House. The museum became a department of the City of Longmont in 1970. In 2002, the new $6 million Longmont Museum & Cultural Center opened at 400 Quail Road in south Longmont, nearly doubling the museum's exhibition and program space.

In 2015 the museum expanded its premises, an expansion including the 250-seat Stewart auditorium, an atrium, and education center.

== Exhibits and programs ==
The Longmont Museum has two permanent exhibits, the Longs Peak Room Interactive Gallery and Front Range Rising, both of which explore the history of Longmont and the northern Colorado Front Range region. Each year it hosts 6-8 special exhibits on a variety of topics. Major recent exhibitions have included Return to Route 66: Photographs from the Mother Road, Ansel Adams & Edwin Land: Art, Science and Invention – Photographs from the Polaroid Collection; and Edward Weston: Life Work. Special exhibits also feature the work of local artists, current issues in science, and in-depth explorations of local and regional history.

The Longmont Museum hosts a Día de los Muertos celebration each year, bringing in over 1,500 people to see altars from the community, hear traditional music, and try pan de muertos and other traditional foods eaten on Día de los Muertos. Another popular education program at the museum is Discovery Days, an art and craft program for ages 2–5 and a parent.
