= Peak to Peak Scenic Byway =

Scenic road in Colorado, United States

Coordinates: 39.9626°N 105.5103°W

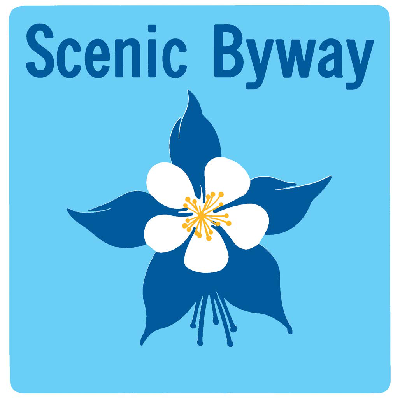
Peak to Peak Scenic Byway National Forest Scenic Byway

Route information
- Maintained by CDOT
- Length: 55 mi (89 km)
- Existed: 1989–present

Major junctions
- South end: SH 119 Black Hawk
- North end: US 34 / US 36 / SH 7 Estes Park

Location
- Country: United States
- State: Colorado
- Counties: Gilpin, Boulder, Larimer counties

Highway system
- Scenic Byways; National; National Forest; BLM; NPS; Colorado State Highway System; Interstate; US; State; Scenic

The Peak to Peak Scenic Byway is a 55-mile (89 km) National Forest Scenic Byway and Colorado Scenic and Historic Byway located in Gilpin, Boulder, Larimer counties, Colorado, USA. The Peak to Peak Highway was originally built in 1918 and provides views of the Front Range mountains in the Colorado Rocky Mountains. It was Colorado's first scenic highway. The Central City/Black Hawk Historic District is a National Historic Landmark.

The Peak to Peak Highway connects to the Trail Ridge Road/Beaver Meadow National Scenic Byway at Estes Park.

== Parks & Recreation Areas ==
- Rocky Mountain National Park
- Golden Gate Canyon State Park
- Arapaho National Forest
- Roosevelt National Forest
- Indian Peaks Wilderness

== Mountain peaks ==
- Mount Flora
- Mount Eva
- Mount Epworth
- Mount Jasper
- Apache Peak
- Mount Audubon 13,229 feet (4,032 m)
- Meadow Mountain
- Copeland Mountain
- Mount Meeker 13,916 feet (4,242 m)
- Longs Peak 14,259 feet (4,346 m)
- Twin Sisters Peaks

== Gallery ==
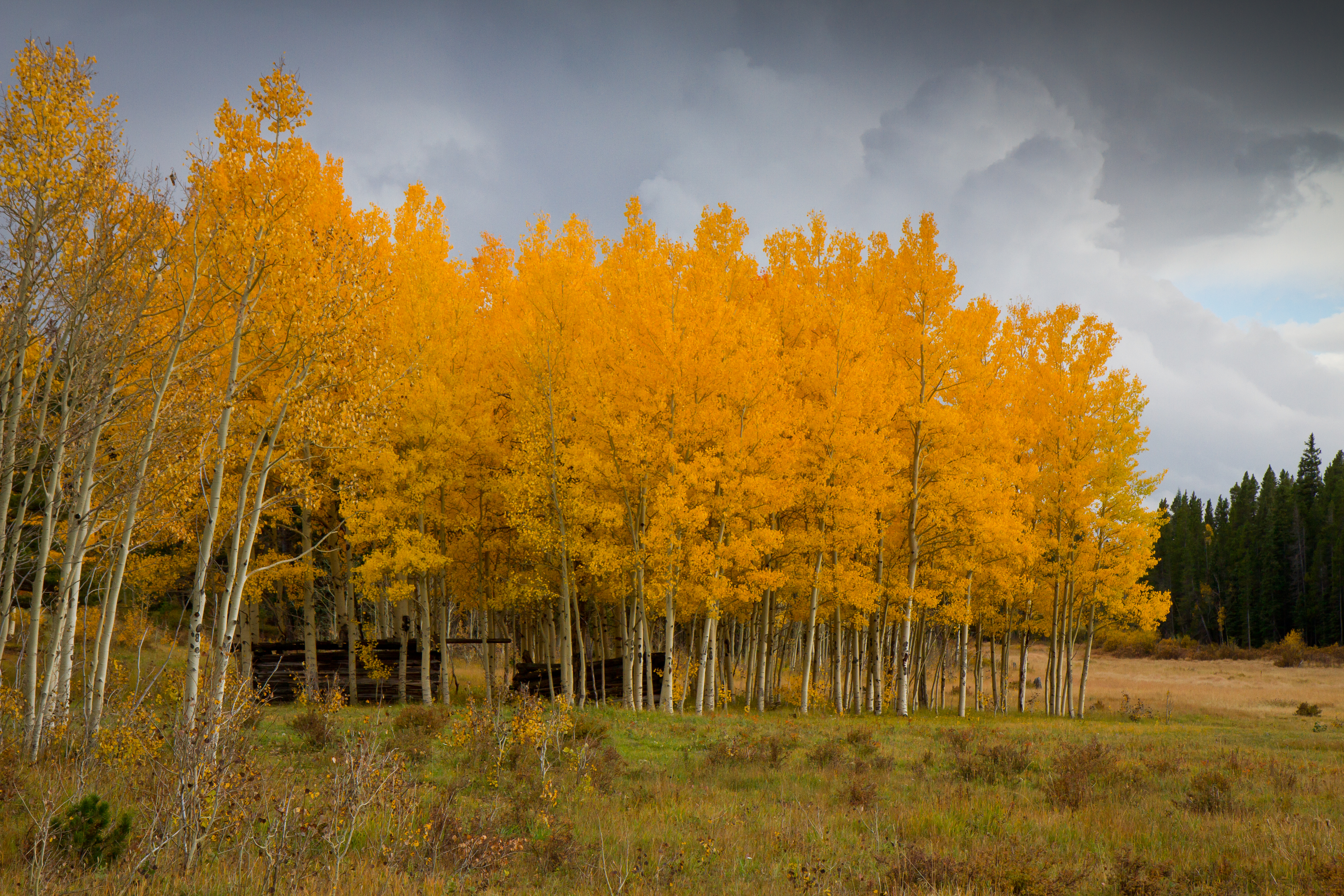
Aspen Trees on the Peak to Peak

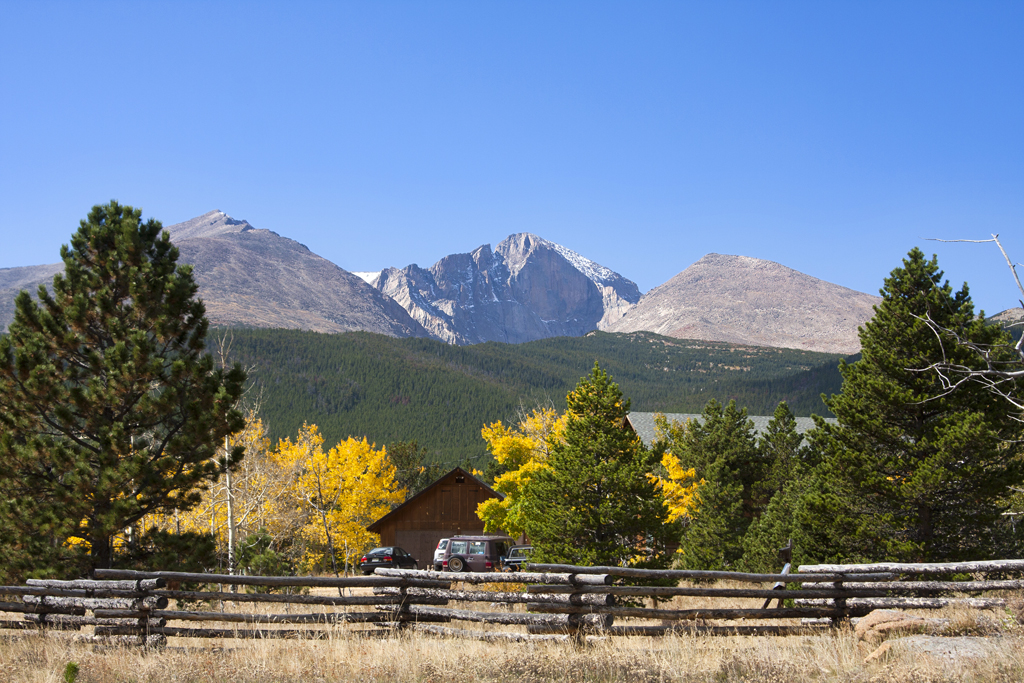
Longs Peak

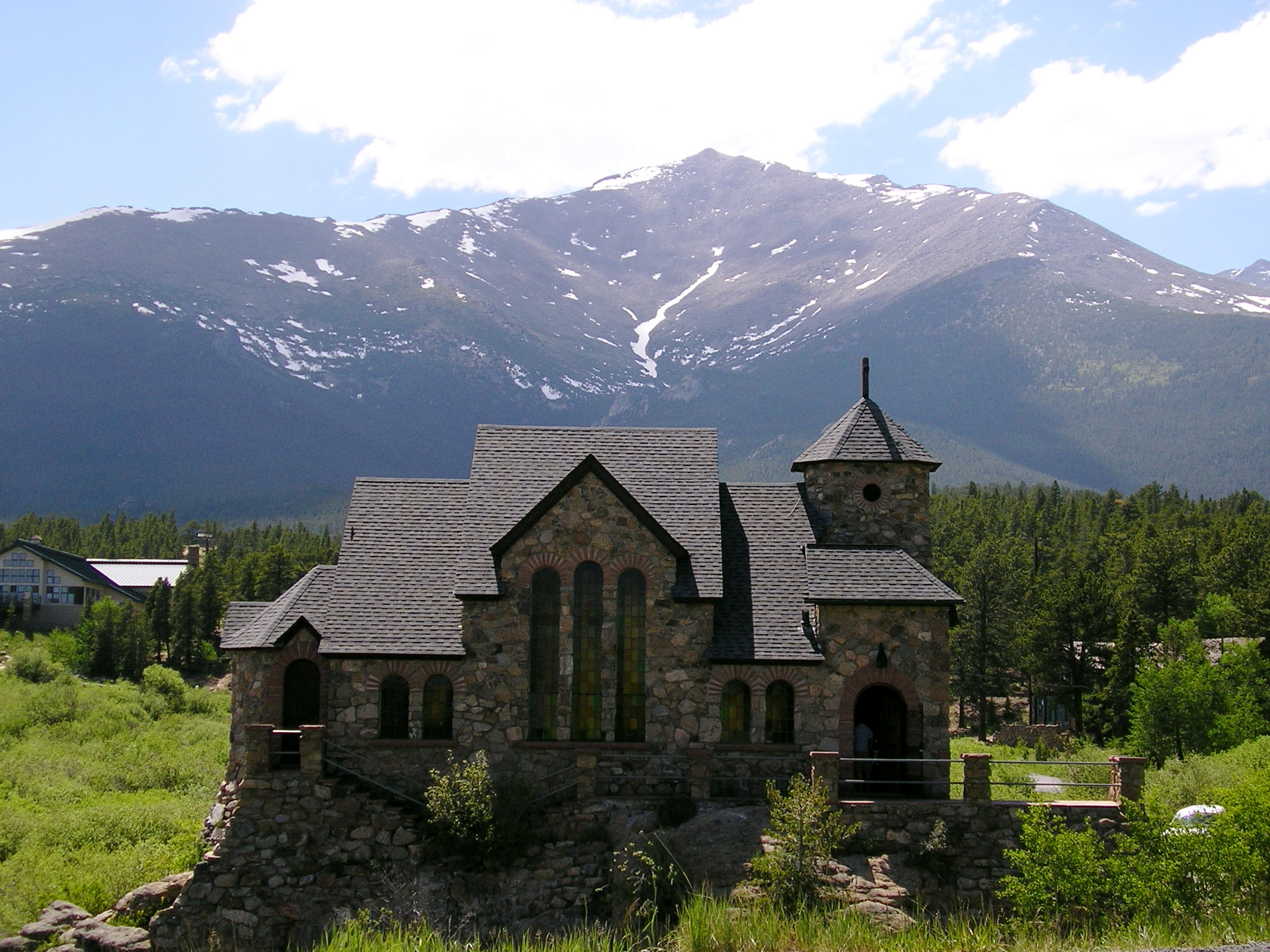
Chapel on the Rock (officially, Saint Catherine of Siena Chapel)

== See also ==
- History Colorado
