= Coal Creek, Jefferson County, Colorado =

Unincorporated community in Colorado, US

Coal Creek, Colorado Coal Creek Canyon
- Census-designated place
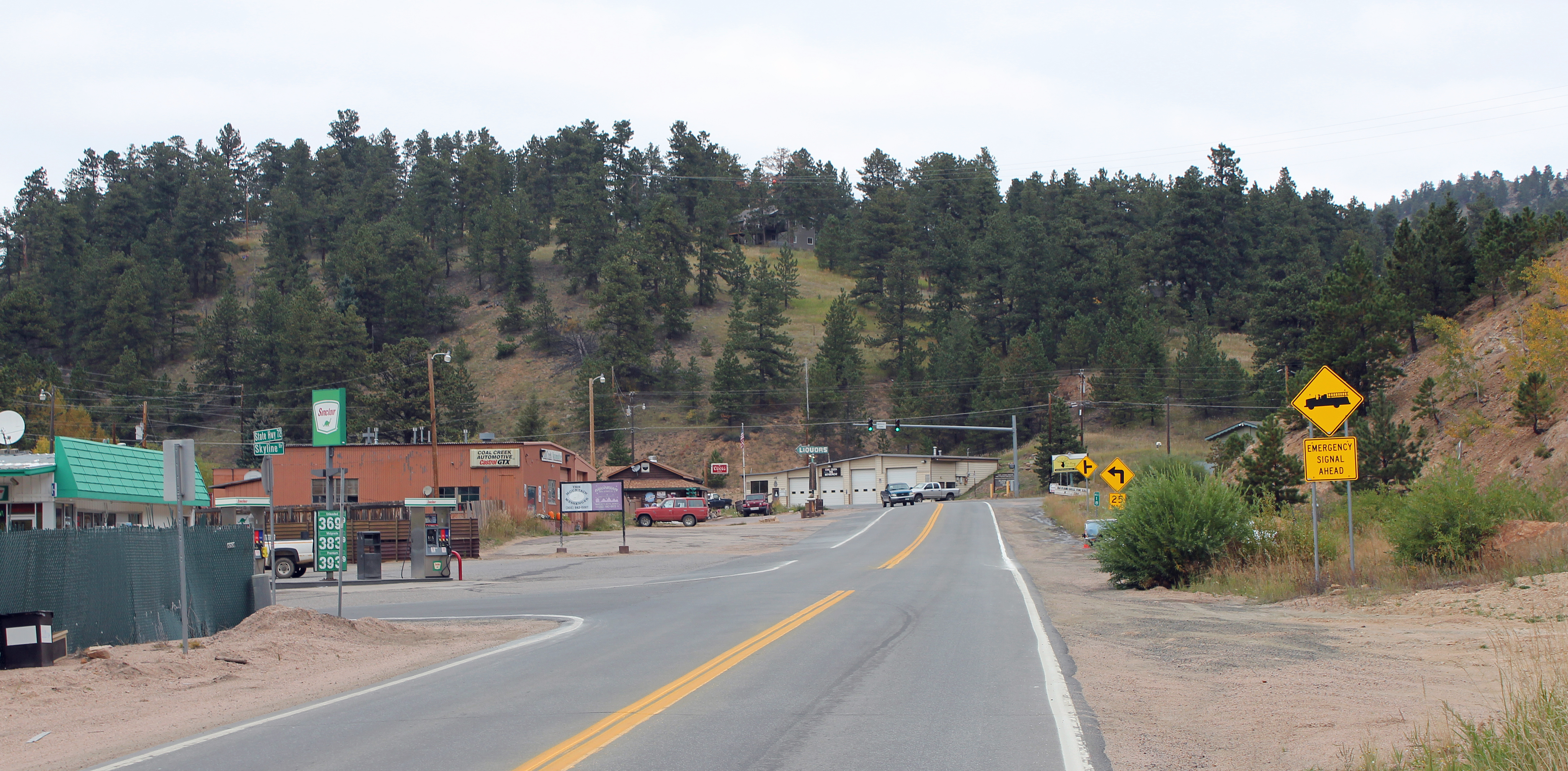
- "Downtown" Coal Creek Canyon.

- Location of the Coal Creek CDP in Jefferson, Boulder, and Gilpin counties, Colorado
- Coordinates: 39°53′50″N 105°22′45″W
- Country: United States
- State: Colorado
- Counties: Jefferson, Boulder, Gilpin

Government
  - Type: Unincorporated community
  - Body: Jefferson County; Boulder County; Gilpin County

Area
  - Total: 9.404 sq mi (24.355 km^{2})
  - Land: 9.388 sq mi (24.316 km^{2})
  - Water: 0.015 sq mi (0.039 km^{2})
- Elevation: 8,754 ft (2,668 m)

Population (2020)
  - Total: 2,494
  - Density: 265.6/sq mi (102.6/km^{2})
- Time zone: UTC−07:00 (MST)
  - Summer (DST): UTC−06:00 (MDT)
- ZIP code: Golden 80403
- Area codes: 303/720/983
- GNIS CDP ID: 2407642
- FIPS code: 08-15302

Coal Creek, commonly known as Coal Creek Canyon, is an unincorporated community and a census-designated place (CDP) located in Jefferson, Boulder, and Gilpin counties, Colorado, United States. The population of the Coal Creek CDP was 2,494 at the United States Census 2020. The unincorporated community is a part of the Denver-Aurora-Greeley, CO Combined Statistical Area and the Front Range Urban Corridor.

== History ==
The Coal Creek, Colorado Territory, post office operated from April 9, 1864, until October 29, 1873, but the Golden, Colorado, post office (Zip code 80403) now serves the area.

== Geography ==
The Coal Creek CDP has an area of 6,018 acres (24.355 km^{2}), including 9.6 acres (0.039 km^{2}) of water.

== Public transportation ==
From the 1990s through the early 2010s, Coal Creek Canyon was served by a limited commuter transit route operated by the Regional Transportation District (RTD). The service, known as Route CC, connected residents of the canyon to the Olde Town Arvada Park-n-Ride, with Park-n-Ride stops at Wondervu, the Coal Creek Canyon Improvement Association, and at the junction of State Highways 72 and 93.

Around 2010, due to low ridership RTD transferred operations of the route to Boulder County, rebranding it as the Coal Creek Express (CCE). Despite reduced costs and efforts to expand ridership—including a proposed extension to Nederland in 2011—the service was discontinued during RTD’s 2012 system-wide service reductions. Currently no fixed-route public transportation operates in Coal Creek Canyon.

== Climate ==
According to the Köppen Climate Classification system, Coal Creek has a warm-summer humid continental climate, abbreviated "BSk" on climate maps, but closely borders on an oceanic climate (Cfb).

Climate data for Coal Creek Canyon, Colorado, 1991–2020 normals, extremes 1984–2019
Month	Jan	Feb	Mar	Apr	May	Jun	Jul	Aug	Sep	Oct	Nov	Dec	Year
Record high °F (°C)	60 (16)	58 (14)	66 (19)	73 (23)	81 (27)	88 (31)	89 (32)	87 (31)	84 (29)	75 (24)	67 (19)	60 (16)	89 (32)
Mean maximum °F (°C)	51.5 (10.8)	51.4 (10.8)	58.3 (14.6)	63.9 (17.7)	71.7 (22.1)	80.5 (26.9)	83.2 (28.4)	81.0 (27.2)	76.9 (24.9)	68.7 (20.4)	58.3 (14.6)	51.6 (10.9)	84.4 (29.1)
Mean daily maximum °F (°C)	33.4 (0.8)	34.2 (1.2)	41.2 (5.1)	45.9 (7.7)	55.3 (12.9)	66.7 (19.3)	73.0 (22.8)	71.2 (21.8)	64.3 (17.9)	51.8 (11.0)	40.9 (4.9)	33.2 (0.7)	50.9 (10.5)
Daily mean °F (°C)	24.5 (−4.2)	24.4 (−4.2)	30.7 (−0.7)	35.2 (1.8)	44.0 (6.7)	54.0 (12.2)	60.3 (15.7)	58.6 (14.8)	51.7 (10.9)	40.8 (4.9)	31.0 (−0.6)	24.0 (−4.4)	39.9 (4.4)
Mean daily minimum °F (°C)	15.6 (−9.1)	14.7 (−9.6)	20.2 (−6.6)	24.4 (−4.2)	32.6 (0.3)	41.2 (5.1)	47.5 (8.6)	46.1 (7.8)	39.2 (4.0)	29.8 (−1.2)	21.1 (−6.1)	14.8 (−9.6)	28.9 (−1.7)
Mean minimum °F (°C)	−6.8 (−21.6)	−8.4 (−22.4)	−0.4 (−18.0)	7.5 (−13.6)	19.3 (−7.1)	31.1 (−0.5)	39.1 (3.9)	36.7 (2.6)	24.8 (−4.0)	12.4 (−10.9)	0.9 (−17.3)	−8.3 (−22.4)	−15.5 (−26.4)
Record low °F (°C)	−24 (−31)	−36 (−38)	−18 (−28)	−10 (−23)	4 (−16)	26 (−3)	33 (1)	30 (−1)	3 (−16)	−11 (−24)	−17 (−27)	−30 (−34)	−36 (−38)
Average precipitation inches (mm)	1.00 (25)	1.32 (34)	2.68 (68)	3.79 (96)	3.24 (82)	2.19 (56)	2.89 (73)	2.84 (72)	1.86 (47)	1.66 (42)	1.23 (31)	1.13 (29)	25.83 (655)
Average snowfall inches (cm)	17.4 (44)	23.2 (59)	35.6 (90)	42.0 (107)	16.6 (42)	0.9 (2.3)	0.0 (0.0)	0.0 (0.0)	2.7 (6.9)	16.1 (41)	18.4 (47)	21.8 (55)	194.7 (494.2)
Average precipitation days (≥ 0.01 in)	9.6	10.4	11.2	13.6	13.6	12.2	14.8	15.4	9.8	8.1	8.1	9.0	135.8
Average snowy days (≥ 0.1 in)	10.5	11.3	12.1	12.7	6.9	0.9	0.0	0.0	1.2	6.2	8.4	10.0	80.2
Source 1: NOAA
Source 2: National Weather Service (mean maxima and minima 1984–2019)

== Demographics ==
The United States Census Bureau initially defined the Coal Creek CDP for the United States Census 2000.

Coal Creek CDP, Colorado
Year	Pop.	±%
2000	2,323	—
2010	2,400	+3.3%
2020	2,494	+3.9%
Source: United States Census Bureau

== See also ==
- Front Range Urban Corridor
