= Pinecliffe, Colorado =

Unincorporated community in Colorado, USA

- Unincorporated community
- Location in Gilpin County and the state of Colorado Pinecliffe, Colorado (the United States)
- Coordinates: 39°55′55″N 105°25′42″W
- Country: United States
- State: Colorado
- Counties: Boulder, Gilpin
- Elevation: 8,012 ft (2,442 m)
- Time zone: UTC-7 (MST)
  - Summer (DST): UTC-6 (MDT)
- ZIP code: 80471
- GNIS feature ID: 181137

Pinecliffe is a U.S. Post Office and an unincorporated community located in Boulder County and Gilpin County, Colorado, United States. The Pinecliffe Post Office, in Boulder County, has the ZIP Code 80471.

== Gallery ==
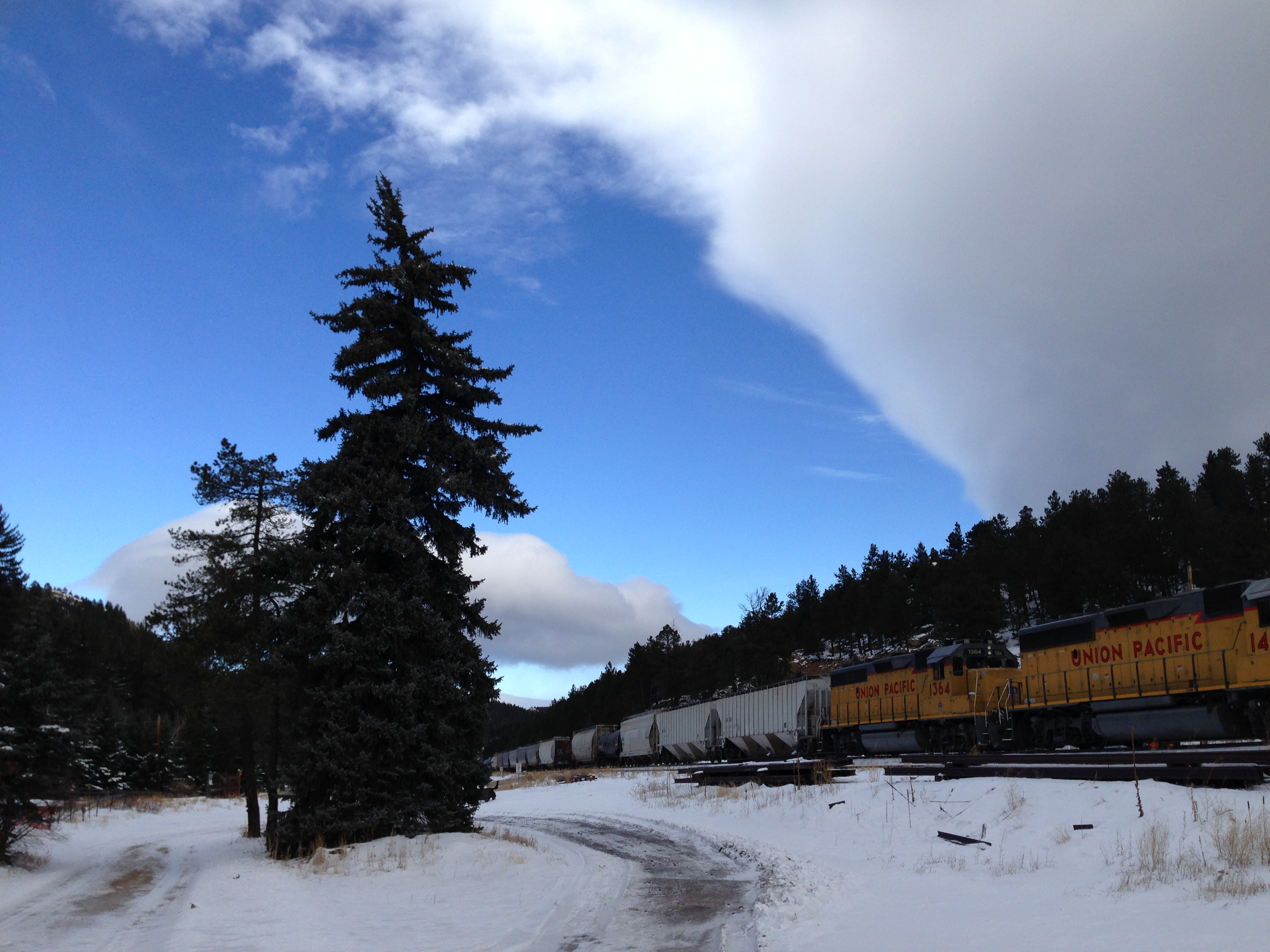
Train through Pinecliffe

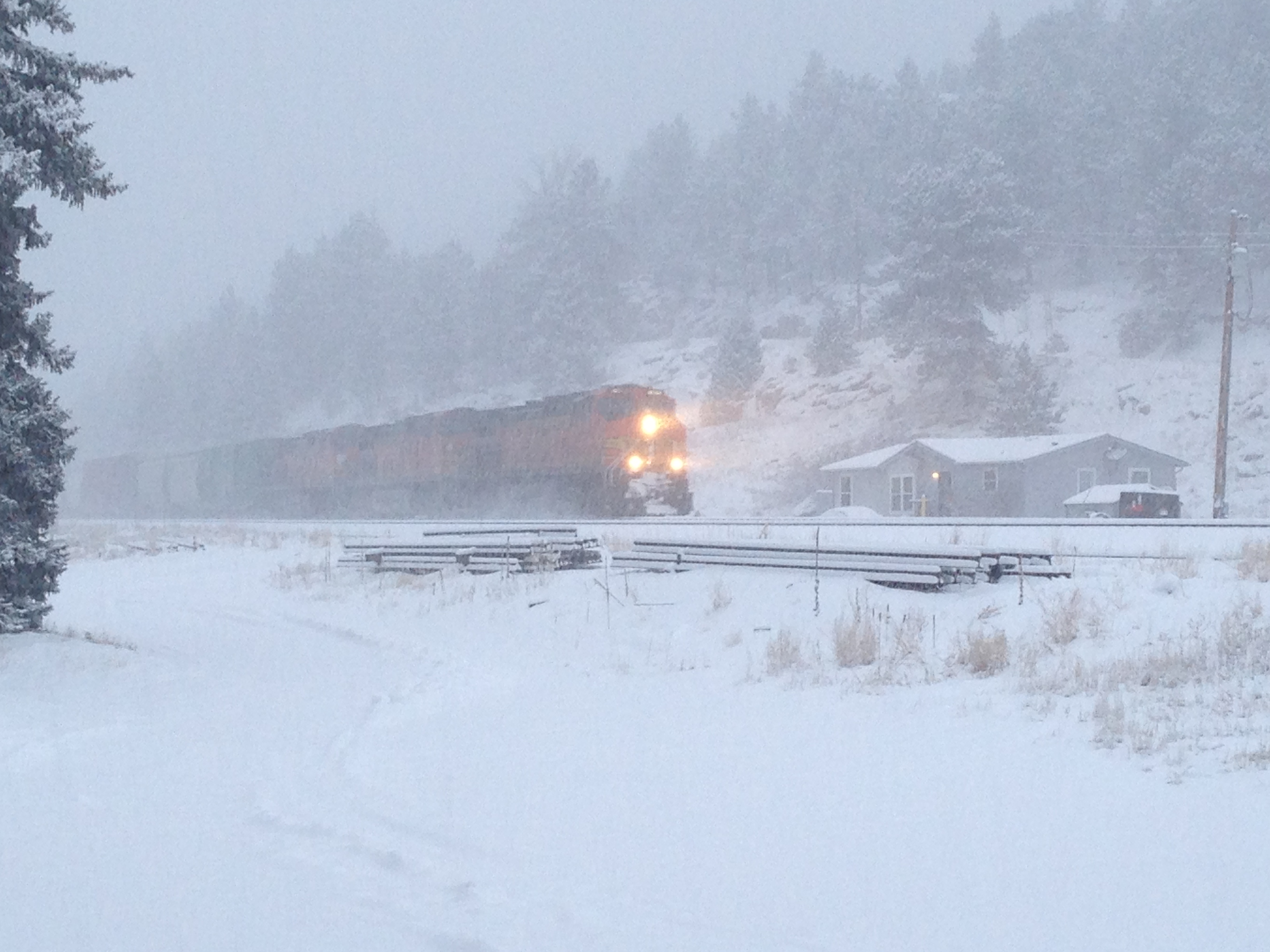
Pinecliffe, CO

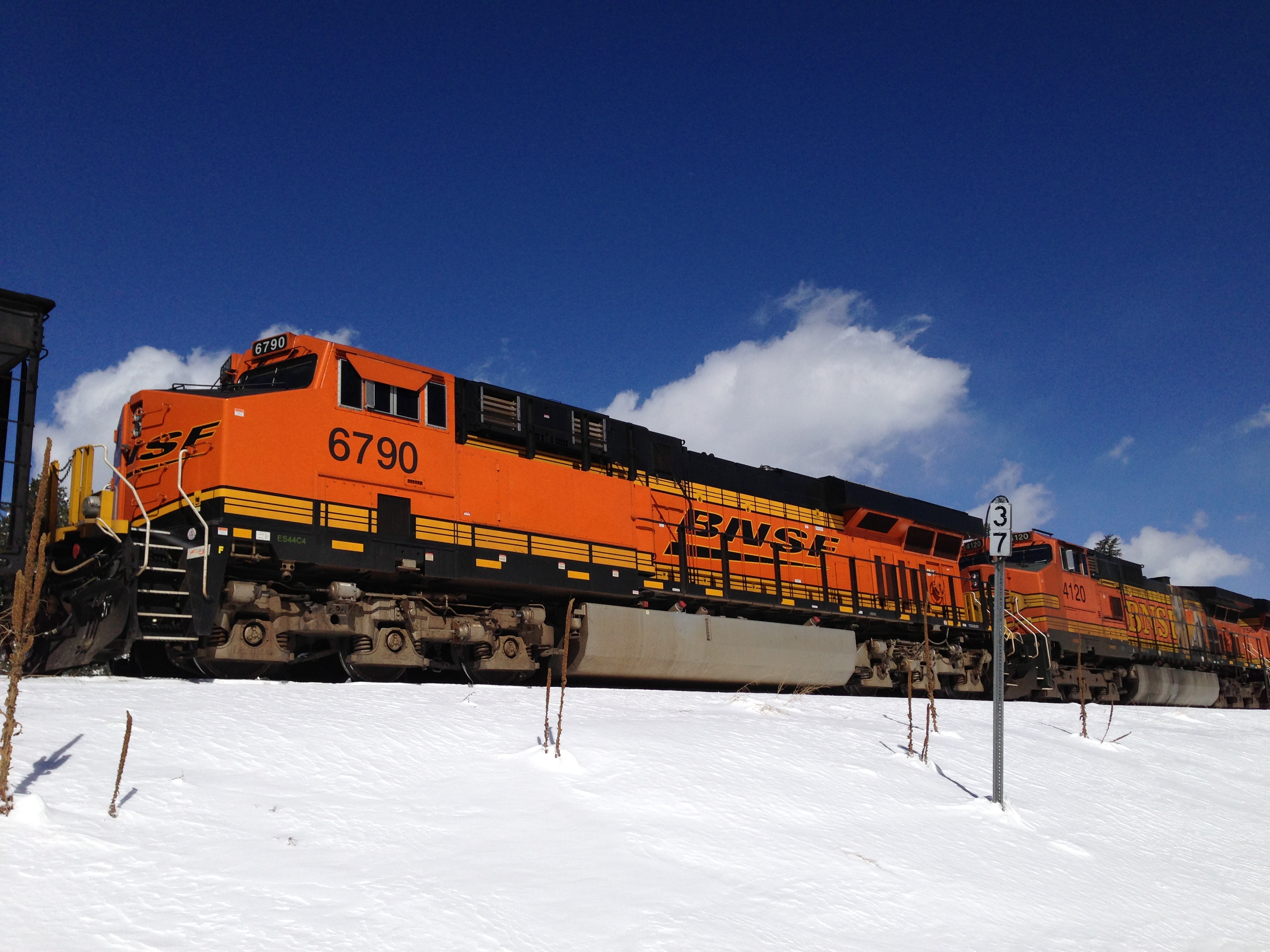
Pinecliffe, CO

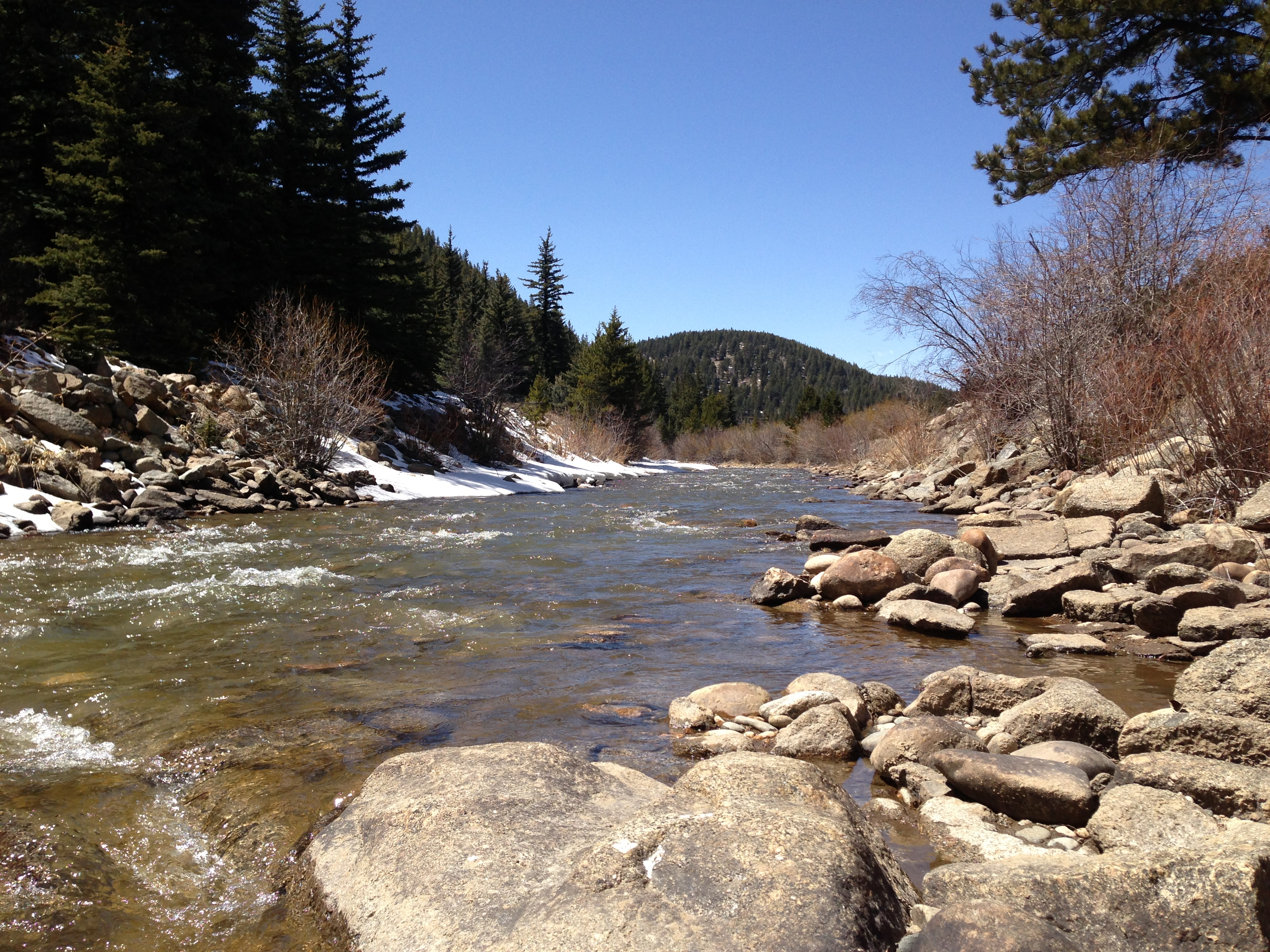
Pinecliffe, CO
