= Golden Gate Canyon State Park =

State Park in Colorado

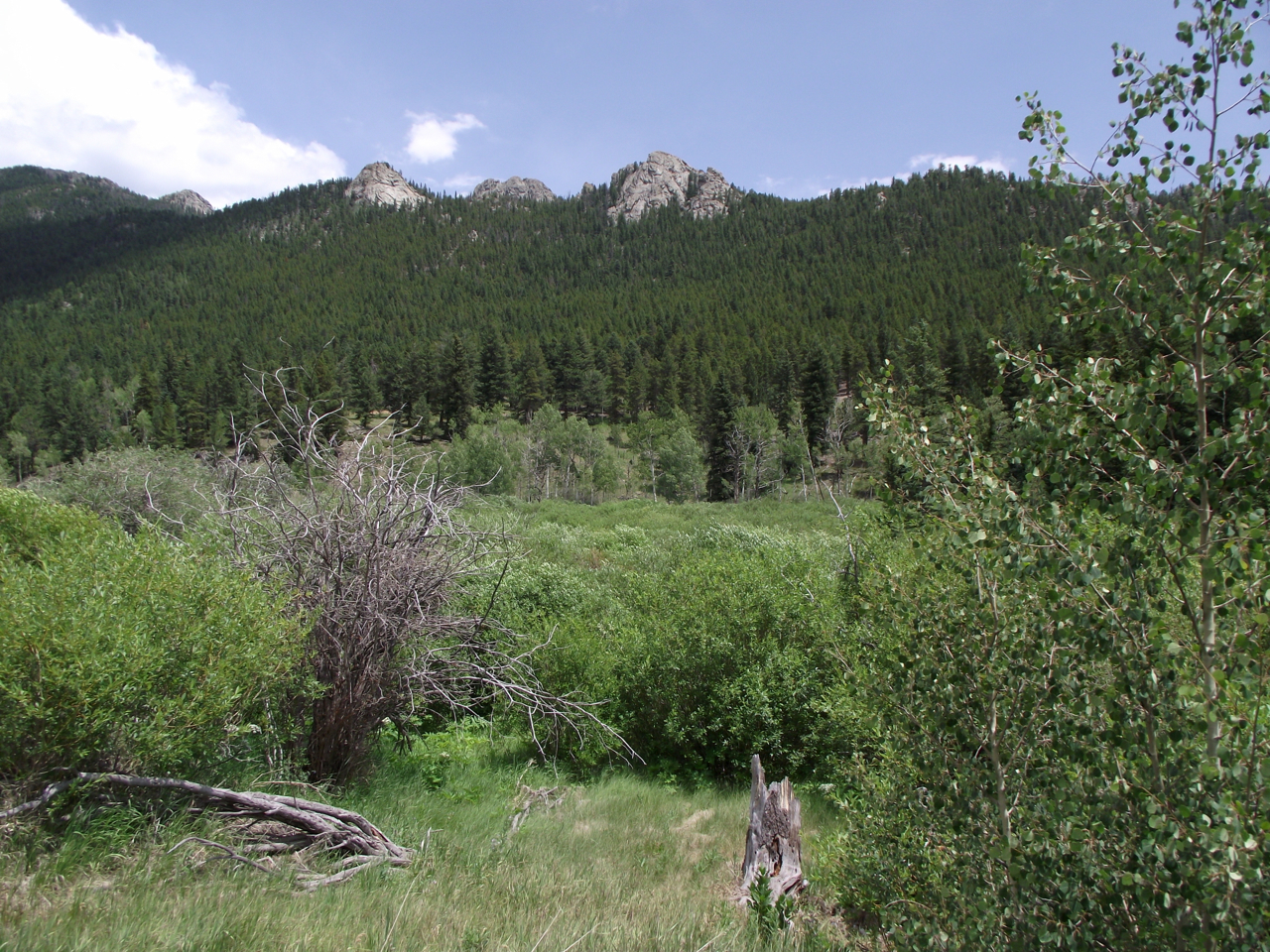
- Rock formations on Tremont Mountain in Golden Gate Canyon State Park

- Location within Colorado
- Location: Jefferson / Gilpin counties, Colorado, United States
- Nearest city: Golden, Colorado
- Coordinates: 39°49′51″N 105°24′38″W
- Area: 12,119 acres (49.04 km^{2})
- Established: 1960
- Visitors: 1,584,203 (in 2021)
- Governing body: Colorado Parks and Wildlife

Golden Gate Canyon State Park is a Colorado State Park located in Gilpin and Jefferson counties northwest of Golden, Colorado. The 12,119-acre (49.04 km^{2}) Front Range park established in 1960 has 42 miles (68 km) of hiking trails. Horse and bicycle travel is allowed on 27 miles (43 km). Facilities include a visitor center, over 100 campsites and 125 picnic sites. In 2019 the park recorded 1,045,131 visits, a 20.6% increase over 2018.

Wetland and riparian plant communities are found along Ralston, Nott and Deer creeks and small ponds within the park. Ponderosa pine, Rocky Mountain juniper, Douglas fir and aspen are found in forested areas. Commonly seen wildlife includes mule deer, elk, black bear, mountain lion, Abert's squirrel and pine squirrel. Visitors also occasionally spot moose, which are increasing in the park. Common birds include turkey vulture, Steller's jay, Clark's nutcracker, mountain bluebird and mountain chickadee.
