= Gilpin County, Colorado =

County in Colorado, United States

- County
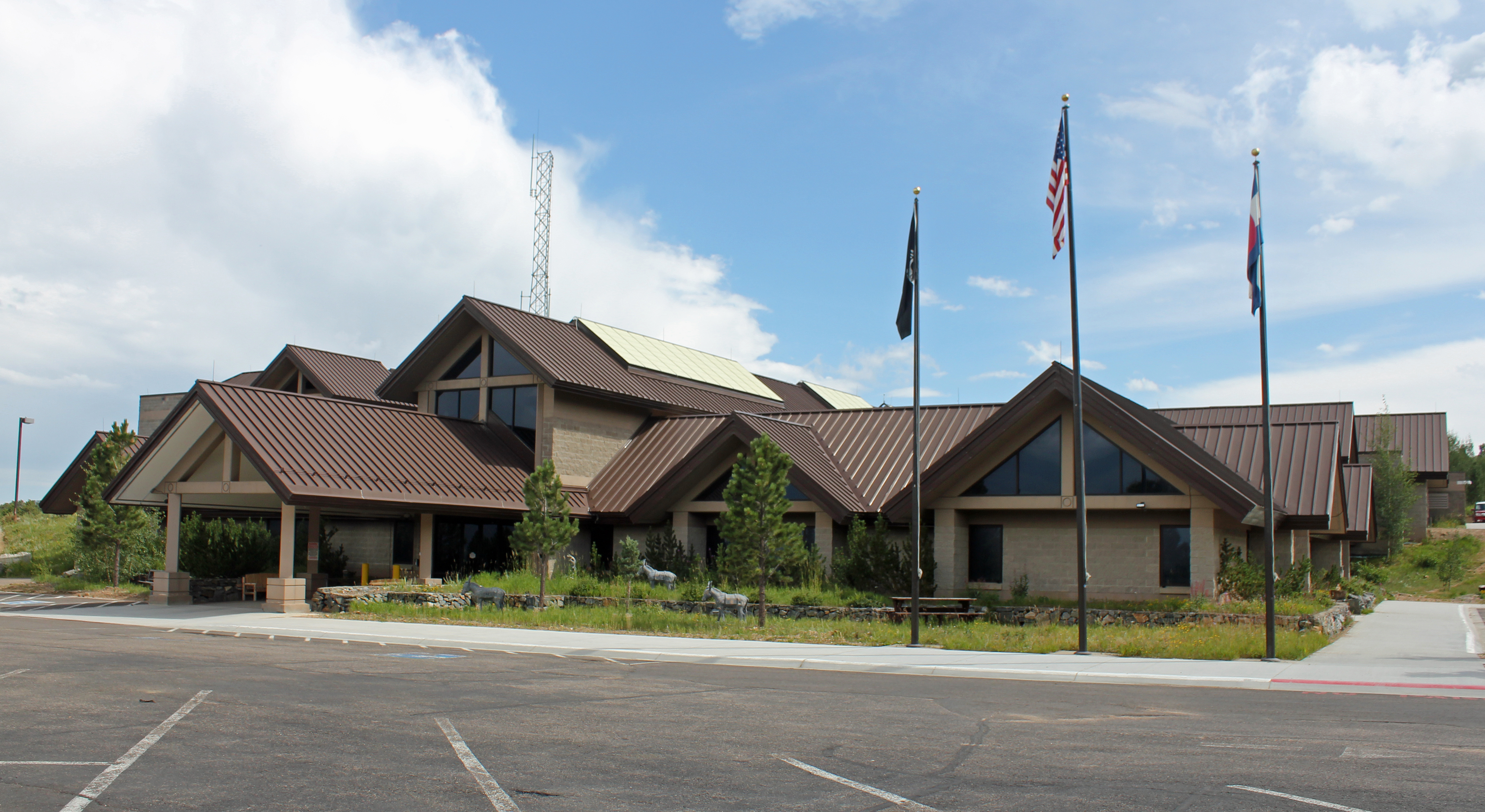
- The Gilpin Combined Court, the county courthouse.

- Flag Seal

- Location within the U.S. state of Colorado
- Coordinates: 39.86°N 105.52°W
- Country: United States
- State: Colorado
- Founded: November 1, 1861
- Named for: William Gilpin
- Seat: Central City
- Largest city: Central City

Area
  - Total: 150 sq mi (390 km^{2})
  - Land: 150 sq mi (390 km^{2})
  - Water: 0.4 sq mi (1.0 km^{2}) 0.2%

Population (2020)
  - Total: 5,808
  - Estimate (2025): 6,073 ▲
  - Density: 39/sq mi (15/km^{2})
- Time zone: UTC−7 (Mountain)
  - Summer (DST): UTC−6 (MDT)
- Congressional district: 2nd
- Website: gilpincounty.colorado.gov

Gilpin County is a county located in the U.S. state of Colorado, smallest in land area behind only the City and County of Broomfield. As of the 2020 census, the population was 5,808. The county seat is Central City. The county was formed in 1861, while Colorado was still a territory, and was named after Colonel William Gilpin, the first territorial governor. Gilpin County is part of the Denver-Aurora-Lakewood, CO Metropolitan Statistical Area.

== Geography ==
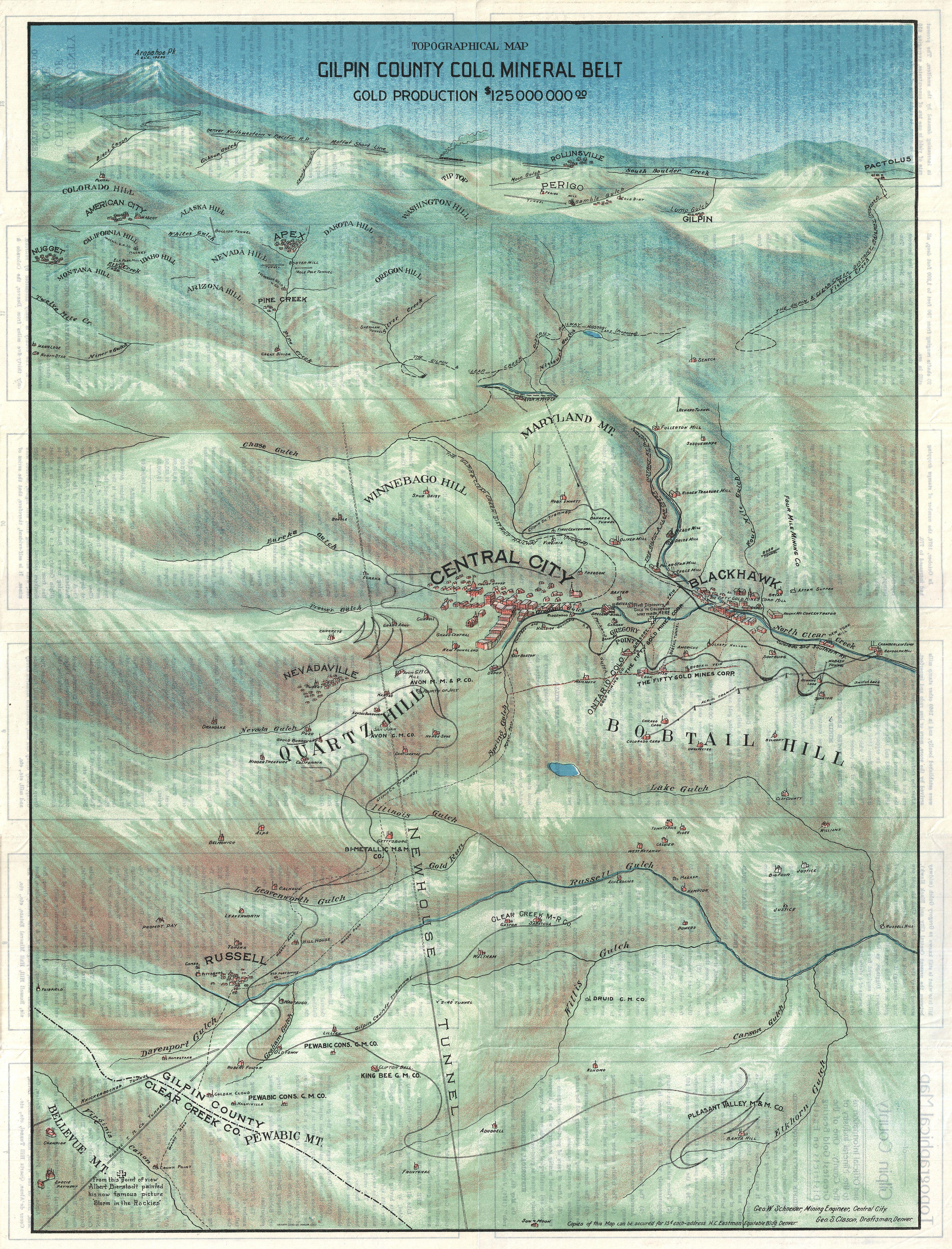
1904 broadside bird's eye view or map of Gilpin County, Colorado, issued by the Gilpin County Chamber of Commerce and the Colorado map publisher George Samuel Clason

According to the U.S. Census Bureau, the county has a total area of 150 square miles (390 km^{2}), of which 150 square miles (390 km^{2}) is land and 0.4 square miles (1.0 km^{2}) (0.2%) is water. It is the second-smallest county by area in Colorado.

=== Adjacent counties ===
- Boulder – north
- Jefferson – east
- Clear Creek – south
- Grand – west

=== Major highways ===
- State Highway 46
- State Highway 72
- State Highway 119
- Central City Parkway

=== National protected areas ===
- Arapaho National Forest
- James Peak Wilderness
- Roosevelt National Forest

=== State protected area ===
- Golden Gate Canyon State Park

=== Scenic trail and byway ===
- Continental Divide National Scenic Trail
- Peak to Peak Scenic and Historic Byway

== Demographics ==
Historical population
Census	Pop.	Note	%±
1870	5,490		—
1880	6,489		18.2%
1890	5,867		−9.6%
1900	6,690		14.0%
1910	4,131		−38.3%
1920	1,364		−67.0%
1930	1,212		−11.1%
1940	1,625		34.1%
1950	850		−47.7%
1960	685		−19.4%
1970	1,272		85.7%
1980	2,441		91.9%
1990	3,070		25.8%
2000	4,757		55.0%
2010	5,441		14.4%
2020	5,808		6.7%
2025 (est.)	6,073	▲	4.6%
U.S. Decennial Census; 1790-1960 1900-1990; 1990-2000 2010-2020

=== 2020 census ===
As of the 2020 census, the county had a population of 5,808. Of the residents, 15.4% were under the age of 18 and 18.3% were 65 years of age or older; the median age was 47.7 years. For every 100 females there were 112.2 males, and for every 100 females age 18 and over there were 115.6 males. 0.0% of residents lived in urban areas and 100.0% lived in rural areas.

Gilpin County, Colorado – Racial and ethnic composition Note: the US Census treats Hispanic/Latino as an ethnic category. This table excludes Latinos from the racial categories and assigns them to a separate category. Hispanics/Latinos may be of any race.
Race / Ethnicity (NH = Non-Hispanic)	Pop 2000	Pop 2010	Pop 2020	% 2000	% 2010	% 2020
White alone (NH)	4,377	4,947	4,952	92.01%	90.92%	85.26%
Black or African American alone (NH)	24	28	32	0.50%	0.51%	0.55%
Native American or Alaska Native alone (NH)	33	34	36	0.69%	0.62%	0.62%
Asian alone (NH)	33	75	85	0.69%	1.38%	1.46%
Pacific Islander alone (NH)	9	9	4	0.19%	0.17%	0.07%
Other race alone (NH)	11	3	37	0.23%	0.06%	0.64%
Mixed race or Multiracial (NH)	68	78	282	1.43%	1.43%	4.86%
Hispanic or Latino (any race)	202	267	380	4.25%	4.91%	6.54%
Total	4,757	5,441	5,808	100.00%	100.00%	100.00%

The racial makeup of the county was 87.4% White, 0.7% Black or African American, 1.0% American Indian and Alaska Native, 1.6% Asian, 0.1% Native Hawaiian and Pacific Islander, 1.3% from some other race, and 7.9% from two or more races. Hispanic or Latino residents of any race comprised 6.5% of the population.

There were 2,608 households in the county, of which 23.0% had children under the age of 18 living with them and 18.7% had a female householder with no spouse or partner present. About 28.9% of all households were made up of individuals and 9.9% had someone living alone who was 65 years of age or older.

There were 3,516 housing units, of which 25.8% were vacant. Among occupied housing units, 80.4% were owner-occupied and 19.6% were renter-occupied. The homeowner vacancy rate was 1.3% and the rental vacancy rate was 14.1%.

=== 2000 census ===
At the 2000 census there were 4,757 people, 2,043 households, and 1,264 families in the county. The population density was 32 people per square mile (12 people/km^{2}). There were 2,929 housing units at an average density of 20 units per square mile (7.7 units/km^{2}). The racial makeup of the county was 94.37% White, 0.53% Black or African American, 0.82% Native American, 0.69% Asian, 0.19% Pacific Islander, 1.53% from other races, and 1.87% from two or more races. 4.25% of the population were Hispanic or Latino of any race. Of the 2,043 households 26.90% had children under the age of 18 living with them, 53.00% were married couples living together, 5.70% had a female householder with no husband present, and 38.10% were non-families. 26.80% of households were one person and 3.70% were one person aged 65 or older. The average household size was 2.32 and the average family size was 2.81.

The age distribution was 21.10% under the age of 18, 5.80% from 18 to 24, 37.40% from 25 to 44, 30.00% from 45 to 64, and 5.70% 65 or older. The median age was 38 years. For every 100 females there were 112.70 males. For every 100 females age 18 and over, there were 116.10 males.

The median household income was $51,942 and the median family income was $61,859. Males had a median income of $38,560 versus $30,820 for females. The per capita income for the county was $26,148. About 1.00% of families and 4.00% of the population were below the poverty line, including 1.40% of those under age 18 and 6.10% of those age 65 or over.

== Politics ==
United States presidential election results for Gilpin County, Colorado
Year	Republican		Democratic		Third party(ies)	
Year	No.	%	No.	%	No.	%
1880	1,236	59.74%	805	38.91%	28	1.35%
1884	1,129	61.43%	614	33.41%	95	5.17%
1888	953	53.09%	688	38.33%	154	8.58%
1892	431	32.53%	0	0.00%	894	67.47%
1896	266	9.43%	2,532	89.76%	23	0.82%
1900	1,371	45.72%	1,498	49.95%	130	4.33%
1904	1,311	49.01%	1,260	47.10%	104	3.89%
1908	843	39.52%	1,185	55.56%	105	4.92%
1912	443	26.65%	931	56.02%	288	17.33%
1916	407	34.17%	763	64.06%	21	1.76%
1920	416	66.99%	189	30.43%	16	2.58%
1924	361	54.78%	161	24.43%	137	20.79%
1928	299	55.17%	236	43.54%	7	1.29%
1932	271	32.46%	539	64.55%	25	2.99%
1936	321	29.81%	736	68.34%	20	1.86%
1940	413	48.65%	431	50.77%	5	0.59%
1944	272	55.85%	213	43.74%	2	0.41%
1948	302	49.43%	296	48.45%	13	2.13%
1952	357	60.41%	228	38.58%	6	1.02%
1956	394	61.66%	244	38.18%	1	0.16%
1960	315	58.55%	223	41.45%	0	0.00%
1964	233	38.83%	363	60.50%	4	0.67%
1968	358	52.57%	218	32.01%	105	15.42%
1972	516	57.02%	362	40.00%	27	2.98%
1976	451	41.19%	563	51.42%	81	7.40%
1980	694	50.04%	441	31.80%	252	18.17%
1984	896	57.03%	634	40.36%	41	2.61%
1988	728	45.79%	804	50.57%	58	3.65%
1992	462	26.26%	726	41.27%	571	32.46%
1996	682	38.12%	799	44.66%	308	17.22%
2000	1,006	40.81%	1,099	44.58%	360	14.60%
2004	1,329	41.58%	1,807	56.54%	60	1.88%
2008	1,283	38.08%	1,990	59.07%	96	2.85%
2012	1,346	40.32%	1,892	56.68%	100	3.00%
2016	1,566	43.79%	1,634	45.69%	376	10.51%
2020	1,833	43.79%	2,223	53.11%	130	3.11%
2024	1,729	41.86%	2,254	54.58%	147	3.56%

== Communities ==
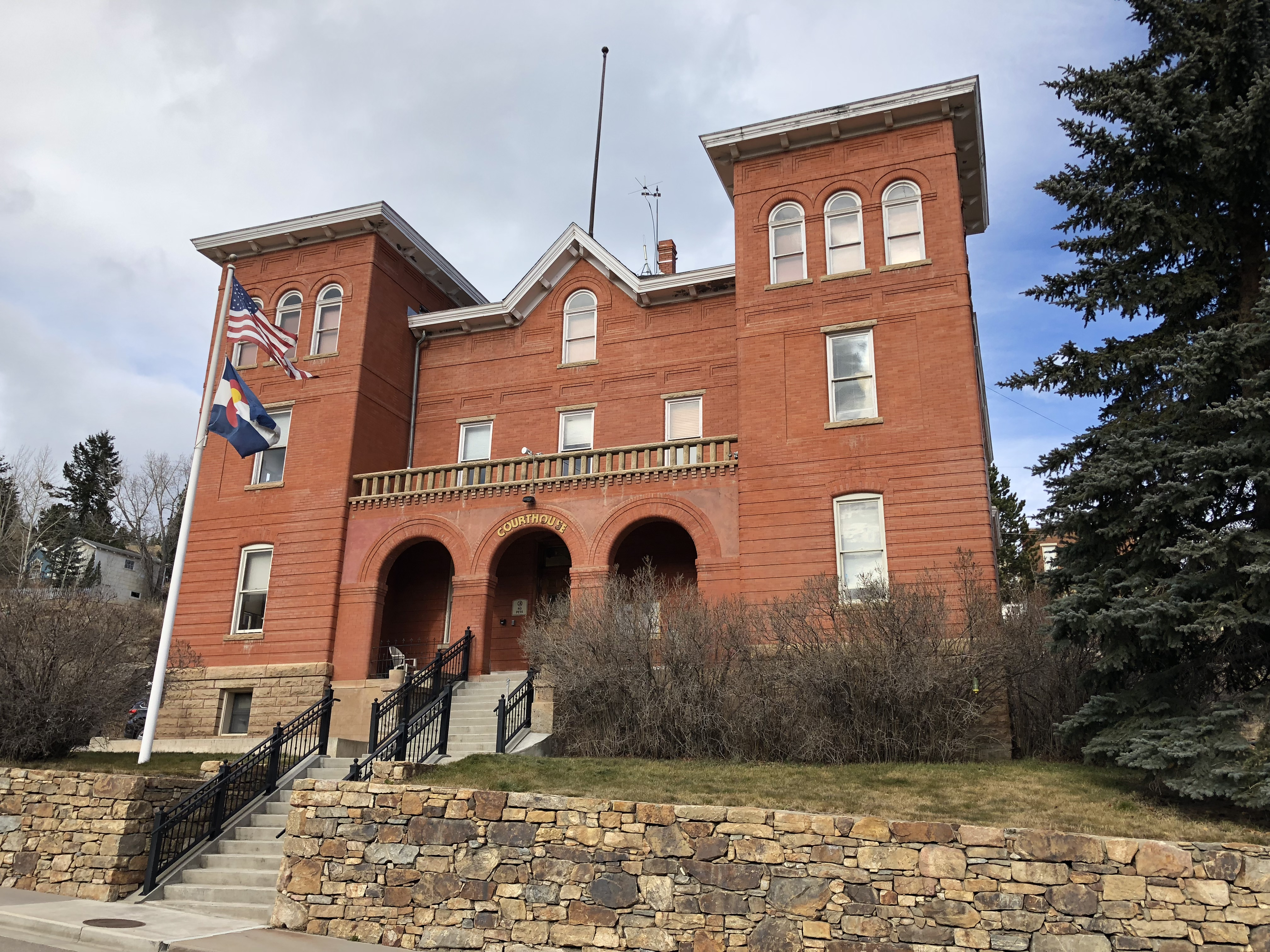
The Old Courthouse in Central City houses much of the county government.

=== Cities ===
- Black Hawk
- Central City

=== Census-designated places ===
- Coal Creek (also in Boulder and Jefferson counties)
- Rollinsville

=== Other ===
- Nevadaville
- Russell Gulch

== Historic district ==
- Central City/Black Hawk Historic District

== See also ==
- Bibliography of Colorado
- Geography of Colorado
- History of Colorado
  - Arapahoe County, Kansas Territory
  - Mountain County, Jefferson Territory
  - National Register of Historic Places listings in Gilpin County, Colorado
  - Hidee Gold Mine
- Index of Colorado-related articles
- List of Colorado-related lists
  - List of counties in Colorado
  - List of statistical areas in Colorado
- Outline of Colorado
  - Front Range Urban Corridor
