= Rollins Pass =

Mountain pass and archaeological site in Colorado, USA

- Boulder Pass, Corona Pass, Rollinsville Pass
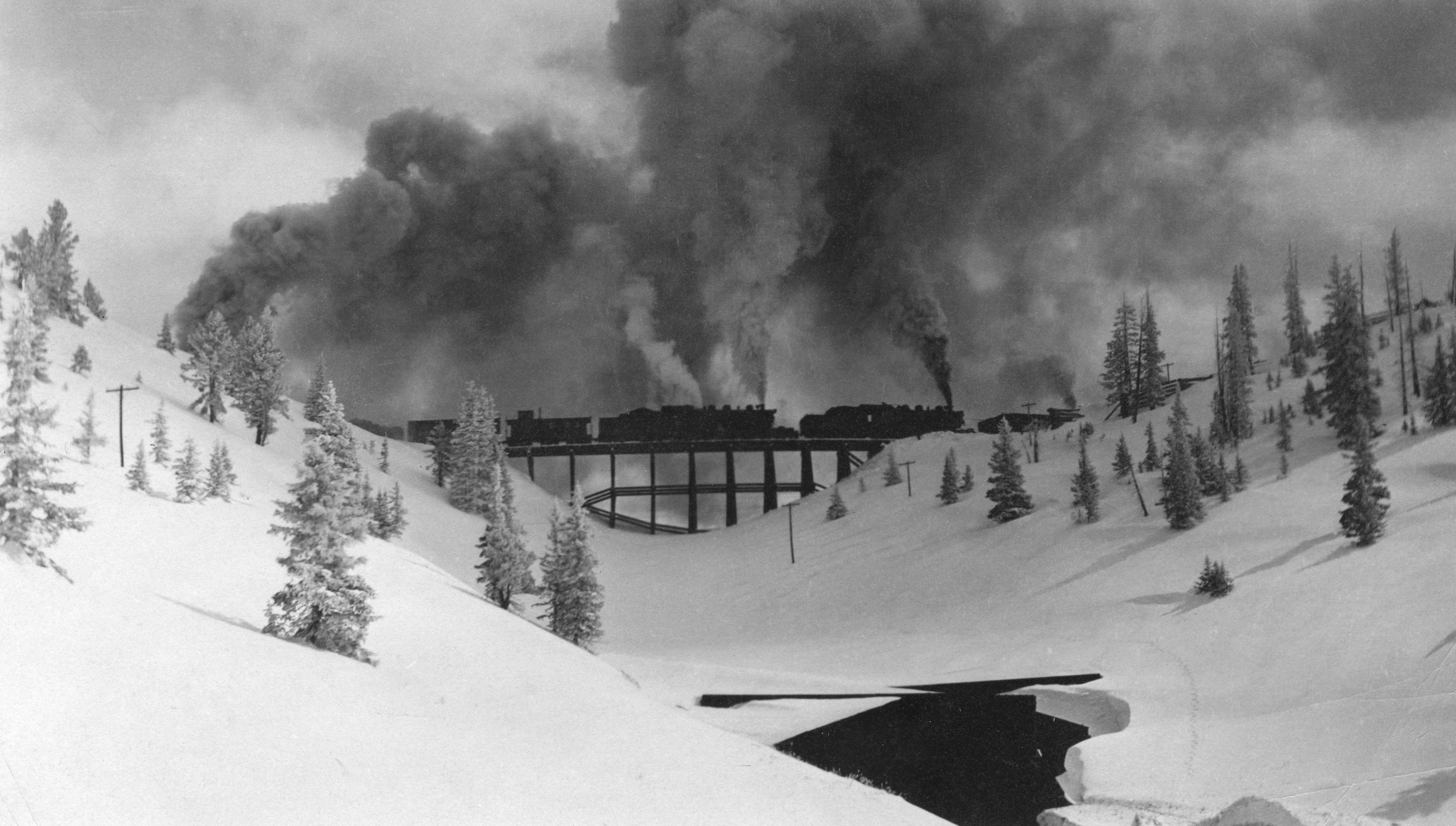
- The Riflesight Notch trestle on Rollins Pass

- Location within Colorado
- Elevation: 11,676.79 ft (3,559.09 m)
- Traversed by: Paleoindians and Native American game drive complexes; historic toll wagon road; abandoned railroad grade; hiking trails, including the Continental Divide Trail; unpaved road; airway radial (V8); 10 in (250 mm) Xcel Energy high-pressure natural gas pipeline

Location
- Location: Boulder, Gilpin, and Grand counties, Colorado, U.S.
- Range: Front Range
- Coordinates: 39°56′03″N 105°40′58″W
- Topo map: USGS East Portal
- Rollinsville and Middle Park Wagon Road / Denver, Northwestern and Pacific Railway Hill Route Historic District
- U.S. National Register of Historic Places
- U.S. Historic district
- Area: 436.3 acres (176.6 ha)
- Built: 1873
- Built by: Rollins, John Q.A.
- NRHP reference No.: 80000881, 97001114
- Added to NRHP: Tuesday, September 30, 1980

Rollins Pass, elevation 11,676 ft (3,559 m), is a mountain pass and active archaeological site in the Southern Rocky Mountains of north-central Colorado in the United States. The pass is located on and traverses the Continental Divide of the Americas at the crest of the Front Range southwest of Boulder, and is approximately five miles (8 km) east and opposite the resort in Winter Park, in the general area between Winter Park and Rollinsville. Rollins Pass is at the boundaries of Boulder, Gilpin, and Grand counties. Over the past 10,000 years, the pass provided a route over the Continental Divide between the Atlantic Ocean watershed of South Boulder Creek (in the basin of the South Platte River) with the Pacific Ocean watershed of the Fraser River, a tributary of the Colorado River.

The abandoned rail route over Rollins Pass was nominated for and accepted into the National Register of Historic Places in 1980 for its significant events and engineering feats achieved through early-20th-century railroading. In 1997, additional areas on the pass were added to the National Register of Historic Places to include achievements made by John Q.A. Rollins and his toll wagon road that traversed the pass.

In 2012, Rollins Pass was listed as one of the most endangered sites in Colorado.

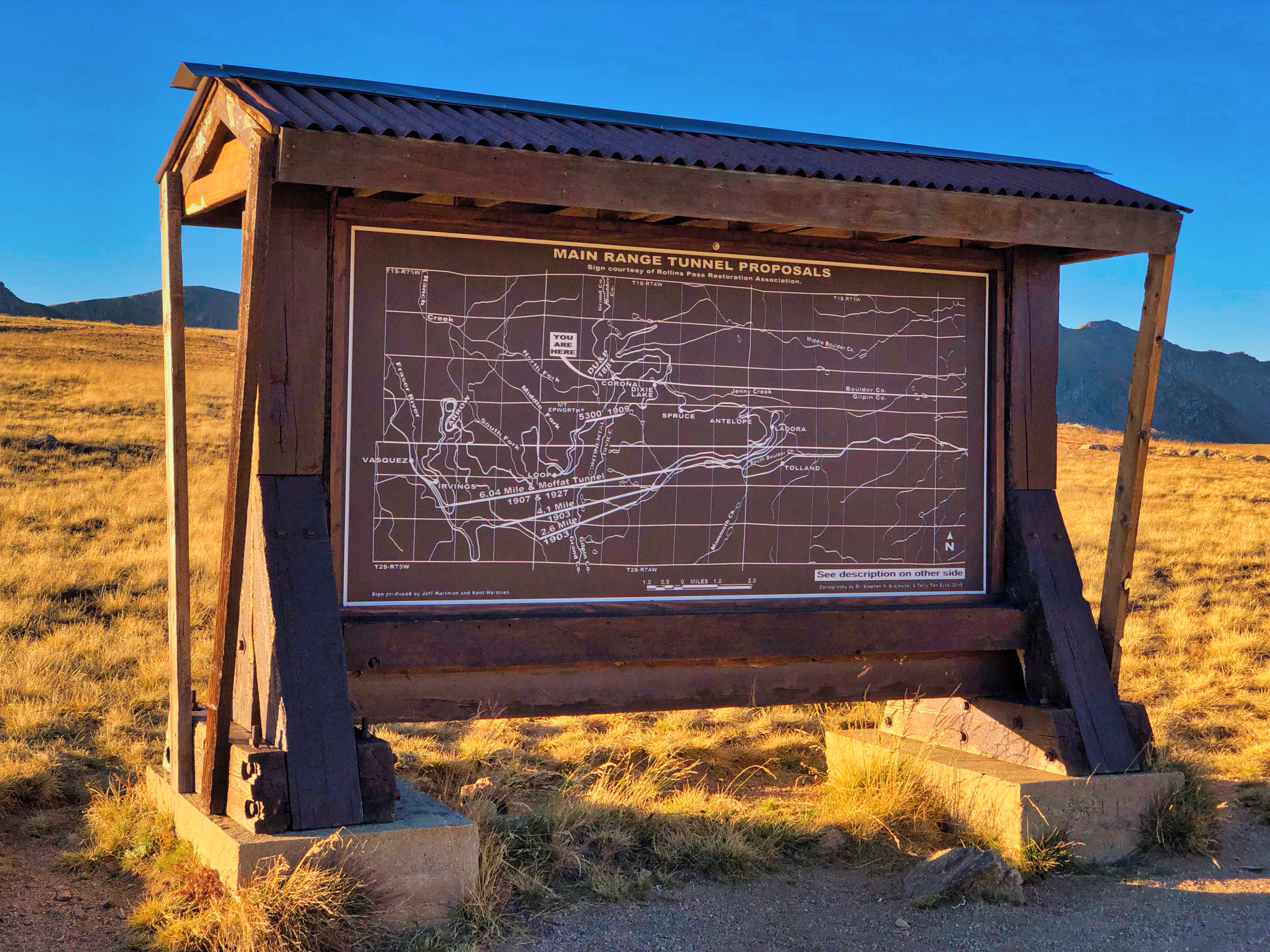
The sign at the summit of Rollins Pass displays four proposed rail tunnel routes through the Continental Divide as alternatives to summiting Rollins Pass; it was the longer Moffat Tunnel that achieved this feat of engineering and was first used in February 1928.

== Naming ==
Rollins Pass is the sole, official name recognized by both the United States Geological Survey and the United States Board on Geographic Names (BGN); a decision card was issued on Wednesday, December 7, 1904. The pass was first known as Boulder Pass—one of two variant names accepted by the BGN—the other being Rogers Pass. The pass was also known infrequently as Rollinsville Pass.

In Grand County, Rollins Pass is sometimes given the sobriquet of Corona Pass, named for the apex station at the summit, Corona. This nomenclature dispute provoked the ire of former railroaders; in fact, Frederick Bauer remarked, "[Rollins Pass is] incorrectly called Corona Pass by neophytes and some locals." It is inconsistent, as well as atypical, to refer to mountain passes by the names of their apex stations. Fremont Pass, for example, is not named Climax Pass; nor is La Veta Pass referred to as Fir Pass.

== Elevation ==
The elevation of 11,660 feet (3,550 m) commonly attributed to Rollins Pass (note the McClure sketch later in this article) "reflects what might have been an original survey value obtained during either the late wagon road era or early railroad construction. ... The actual benchmarked survey elevation value of the summit of Rollins Pass is 11,671 feet (NGVD29), obtained during a 1952 second-order level line run from State Bridge to Denver by the United States Coast and Geodetic Survey (predecessor to the National Geodetic Survey). When adjusted to NAVD88, the elevation is, without doubt, 11,676.79 feet."

== Description ==
Rollins Pass has been in continuous use for millennia: first as a sprawling and internationally significant game drive complex that was hand-constructed and used by Paleoindians more than 10,000 years ago through the mid-19th century; followed by nearly two decades as a wagon road from 1862 to 1880; as a rail route (under survey, construction, and later operational) from 1880 to 1928; as a primitive automobile road from 1936 to 1956; and since September 1, 1956, as a seasonal, unpaved motor vehicle road.

The pass is traversed by Paleo-Indian and Native American game-drive complexes, hiking trails (including the Continental Divide Trail), an airway radial (V8), a 10-inch (25-centimeter) Xcel Energy high-pressure natural gas pipeline, and two roads:

- The first dirt road is the Rollinsville and Middle Park Wagon Road, created in the early 1860s; this route predates the rail line. This road employed much of what would later become Rollins Pass, particularly above timberline. This original wagon route, now called the Boulder Wagon Road, took a steep counterclockwise route up Guinn Mountain, encircling Yankee Doodle Lake before continuing to head west/northwest to proceed over the summit and down into the Middle Park valley near present-day Winter Park and Fraser.
- The second dirt road is mostly the former roadbed of the Denver, Northwestern, and Pacific Railway, which later became the Denver and Salt Lake Railway. This high-altitude railroad grade was part of the Moffat Road, and this route was replaced (and later abandoned) by the opening of the Moffat Tunnel in 1928; the rails and ties were removed from Rollins Pass in 1936; however, some rail segments as well as ties, made of pine, oak, and walnut, can still be seen, along with planking used for snowsheds.

== Geology ==
The Front Range was created by the Laramide Orogeny, a major mountain-building event, which occurred between 70 and 40 million years ago. Tectonic activity during the Cenozoic Era changed the Ancestral Rocky Mountains via block uplift, eventually forming the Rocky Mountains as they exist today. The geologic make-up of Rollins Pass and the surrounding areas was also affected by deformation and erosion during the Cenozoic Era. Many sedimentary rocks from the Paleozoic and Mesozoic eras exist in the basins surrounding the pass.

== History ==
=== Prehistoric and Native American use ===
For thousands of years, Indigenous peoples used Rollins Pass as a route across the Continental Divide and as an alpine hunting landscape. Archaeological research has documented an extensive complex of stone walls, cairns, and hunting blinds that were constructed and reused over long periods to help guide large game, including elk and bighorn sheep, toward waiting hunters. The complex is an important example of high-altitude communal hunting in the Southern Rocky Mountains, and continuing archaeological research is refining understanding of its age, extent, and cultural significance.

=== Rollins Pass as a late-prehistoric and historic Native American route ===
Rollins Pass has a documented history as a migratory route, hunting trail, and battlefield among the late prehistoric and contact-period Indians of Colorado.

The Indians, both Ute and Arapahoe, used Rollins Pass. While it is possible to ride a horse across the Range at almost any point except some of the higher and rougher peaks, the Indians were as much interested as the white man in seeking a good grade. Instead of wagons, they used teepee poles as drag-poles to transport supplies and papooses, and they needed to follow easy grades and broad, level country wherever practical.

— Edgar McMechen, Romantic History of Rollins Pass, Municipal Facts, Volume VI, numbers 8 & 9

=== Rollins Pass as an historic wagon road ===
The first recorded use of the pass (then known as Boulder Pass or Rollinsville Pass) by a wagon train was in 1862, nearly 14 years before Colorado became a state. Directions for wagons traveling from Rollinsville to Winter Park were published in newspapers. John Quincy Adams Rollins, a Colorado pioneer from a family of pioneers, constructed a toll wagon road over the pass in the 1873, providing a route between the Colorado Front Range and Middle Park; subsequently, Rollins Pass was named after John Q.A. Rollins.

==== John Quincy Adams Rollins ====
John Q.A. Rollins was born on Sunday, June 16, 1816, in Gilmanton, New Hampshire, and was the son of a New England minister. Rollins is described as being a strong man and an extensive character, popular with almost everybody whom he did not owe, and his one predominating fault was his failure to pay his debts. Newspapers cited that he was so careless about his credit that he could not keep track of all his creditors; in turn, they had trouble keeping track of him. Rollins died on Wednesday, June 20, 1894, and is buried in Colorado's oldest operating cemetery, Riverside, in block 5, lot 12. His simple tombstone reads, "John Q.A. Rollins | Colorado Pioneer of Rollinsville and Rollins Pass." Colonel Rollins' newspaper obituary mentions, "No man in Northern Colorado was better known nor counted more warm friends than John Q.A. Rollins."

==== Middle Park and South Boulder Wagon Road Company ====
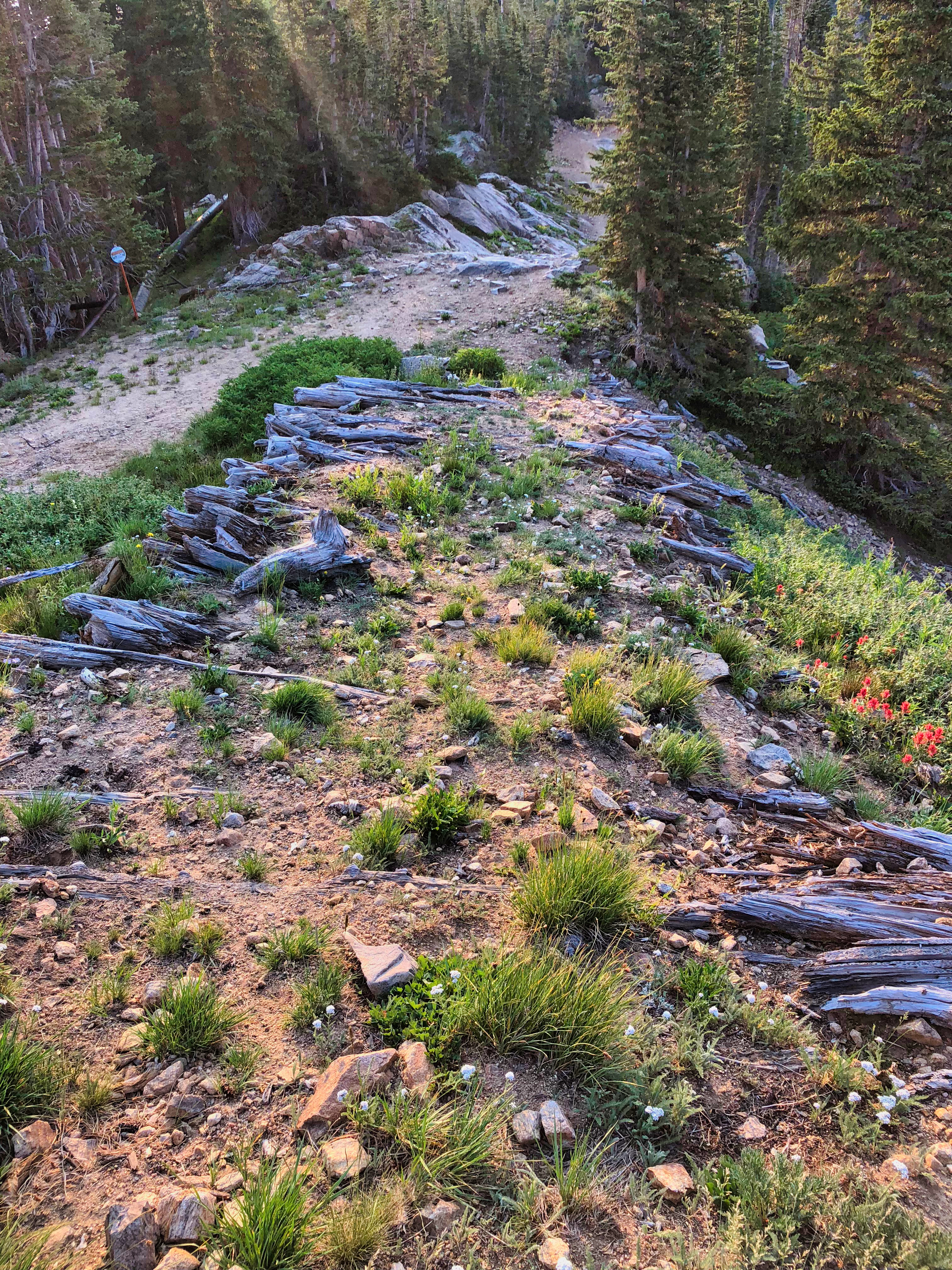
Original log cribbing on Rollins Pass, laid by John Q.A. Rollins, to aid with the passage of wagons in this area along Guinn Mountain. This view is looking due east; out of frame and directly below at right is Yankee Doodle Lake.

John Rollins capitalized on this and received approval for his toll wagon road on Tuesday, February 6, 1866. The Council and House of Representatives of Colorado Territory passed an act signed by the governor approving the wagon road as the "Middle Park and South Boulder Wagon Road Company". Records reflect the incorporators as "John Q.A. Rollins, Perley Dodge, Frederic C. Weir." Yet, the "Rollins road" through Boulder Pass was not completed until the first half of August 1873. While the newspaper articles stated that "wagons can now be taken over this route without the slightest trouble," other articles countered, "the trail ... is splendid for horses but fearful for wagons" and "the rocks, mud-holes, bogs, creeks, boulders and sidling ledges of that road, can only be appreciated by being seen, the only wonder is that a wagon can be taken over at all." Other articles were a bit more grim, referring to the wagon road as a "little more than the rocky ridge of a precipice along which lurked death and disaster." Newspaper records reflect on Friday, June 12, 1874, that James Harvey Crawford along with his wife, Margaret Emerine Bourn Crawford, made pioneer history as the first (nonindigenous) couple to cross Rollins Pass by wagon, and Mrs. Crawford is credited as the first woman to cross the pass. That day held many challenges, including a two-hour blizzard, "which was of terrific violence", and she remarked in a newspaper article, "the bumping was so hard I thought I was nearly dead." As there was no formal road constructed from "Yankee Doodle Camp on up, only an Indian trail, she and the children had been left behind while her husband took the wagon pulled by a pair of mules, a team of horses and a yoke of oxen on up and camped. Then he came back for her with the team and the running gear only of the wagon, and she had to hold the children on someway, despite the dreadful bumping" with the "wagon almost standing on end."

The pass was used heavily in the latter half of the 19th century by settlers, and at one time as many as 12,000 cattle at a time were driven over the pass. The wagon road had one tollgate and the following rate structure: "For each vehicle drawn by two animals, two dollars and fifty cents; for each additional two animals, twenty-five cents; each vehicle drawn by one animal, one dollar and fifty cents; horse and rider and pack animals, twenty-five cents; loose stock, five cents per head ... horse with rider, or pack animal with pack, ten cents." The cost for nonpayment of a toll was the same as causing intentional damage to the road: $25.

According to the manuscript of Martin Parsons, "Twistin Dogies Tails Over Rollins Pass", each summer, Mr. Rollins would "build a cribbing of logs ... and would fill the center with rocks and earth, which helped reduce the grade between the hills." The original log cribbing can be seen today on the narrow ridge of Guinn Mountain, north of Yankee Doodle Lake. Rollins also built The Junction House, "a large, two-story hewd-log structure" as a hotel, "at the point of intersection of the Berthoud and Rollins roads."

The road began to fall out of use and into disrepair in 1880, approximately one year before early railroading attempts over the pass began.

==== Mining efforts on Guinn Mountain at Yankee Doodle Lake ====
Guinn Mountain, encircling Yankee Doodle Lake, was used for mining from the early 1870s through the establishment of the railroad in 1904.

This area held at least "four silver lodes" or "five patented lode claims, one patented placer claim, several prospect pits, and the dump of one caved adit." This caved adit, once 365 feet (111 m), then lengthened to 850 feet (260 m), is still shown as a mine on United States Geological Survey topographic maps as the Blue Stones Mine. This tunnel exposed a "five-foot vein of ore varying in values from $16 to $25 per ton."

It was concluded that the "Guinn Mountain area has little or no economic potential", despite listings of important mineral strikes in period newspapers. Further, "ten samples collected in the area contained only negligible amounts of any metal. Samples from the Avalon placer claim, located on the South Fork [of] Middle Boulder Creek north of Guinn Mountain, and from the creek bottom were collected and panned; no gold was found." Despite this record, gold claims were nevertheless worked nearby with no published record of success.

=== Rollins Pass as a historic railroad route ===
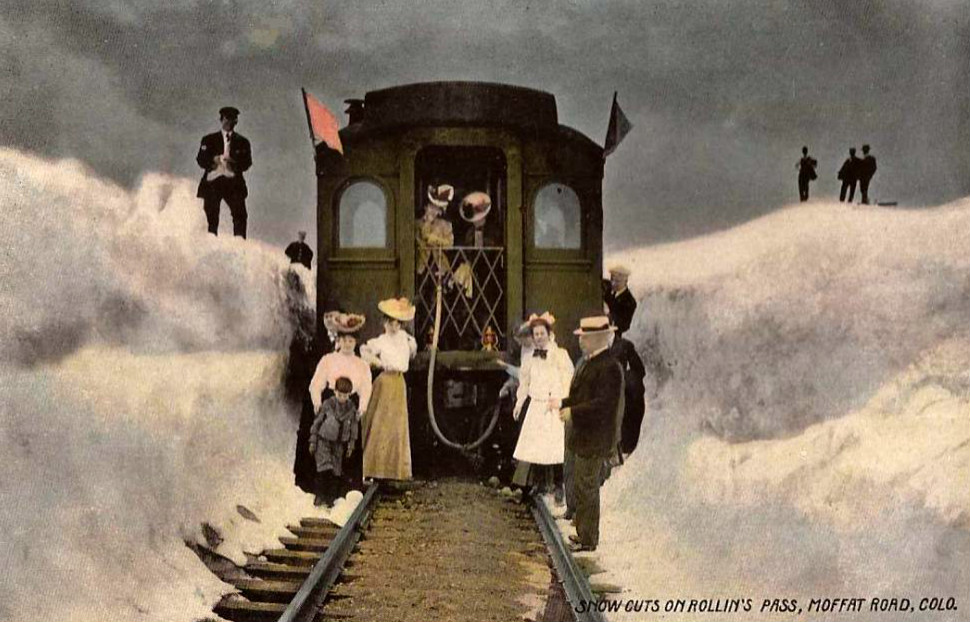
"Snow cuts on Rollin's [sic] Pass, Moffat Road, Colo." This is a colorized sketch of McClure photograph 257-8067, the description stating, "Snow scene, summit Rollin's Pass: elevation, 11,660 feet; on Moffat Line R. R., three hours' ride from Denver. Photograph taken in May, 1906. The region of perpetual snow. Photograph by L.C. McClure, Denver."

==== Early railroad endeavors ====
There were multiple prior efforts to build a railroad over Rollins Pass in the 19th century, and all attempts were met with impassable engineering challenges, financing issues, or both: GHS, Jefferson, & Boulder County Railroad and Wagon Road (A.N. Rogers' line) in 1867; U.P. in 1866; Kansas Pacific in 1869; Colorado Railroad (B. & M. subsidiary) in 1884—two tunnels located; Denver, Utah & Pacific in 1881 (construction started and tunnel located). The remains of the latter tunneling attempt can still be seen on the northern slope of the rock wall at Yankee Doodle Lake; the detritus from the attempted excavation of the tunnel was placed at the northernmost part of the lake, where pulverized granite tailings can be seen rising out of the water. These tailings were definitively from the 1880s tunneling efforts, as they are not visible in the early stereoscopic images from the wagon-road era of Yankee Doodle Lake; further, the attempted tunnel was not part of the later rail line that ultimately summited Rollins Pass.

==== The Moffat Road over Rollins Pass ====
In the early 20th century, David Moffat, a Denver banker, established the Denver, Northwestern and Pacific Railway with the intention of building a railroad from Denver toward Salt Lake City, Utah, by way of a tunnel under the Continental Divide. Surveys began in April 1902, and construction was started in January 1903, beginning on the east side of Rollins Pass. However, the railway only reached Craig, Colorado. This entire line from Denver to Craig was known as the Moffat Road.

The line included a 23-mile (37 km) stretch over the top of the Continental Divide, at Rollins Pass, with a 2–4% grade and switchbacks along many sections; the result was one of the highest adhesion (non-cog) standard-gauge railroads ever constructed in North America. This corridor over Rollins Pass was always intended to be temporary until what would later become the Moffat Tunnel was constructed and opened; therefore, this overmountain route was constructed with more cost-effective materials: using wooden trestles (made of all Oregon fir) instead of iron bridges or high fills and wyes instead of turntables. Construction of this route was exceptionally dangerous and deadly: in a single day, 60 Swedish workers were killed when a powder charge exploded prematurely during the construction of Needle's Eye Tunnel.

Along this route were three tunnels: Tunnel #31 (the tunnel at Ladora), Tunnel #32 (Needle's Eye Tunnel), and Tunnel #33 (the Loop Tunnel at Riflesight Notch). All three tunnels today are either completely caved in or have had multiple partial cave-ins. Other notable landmarks on the route included the Riflesight Notch Loop, located at Spruce Mountain: a 1.5-mile (2.4 km) spiral or loop where trains crossed over a trestle, made a ~270 degree gradual turn to descend 150 feet (46 m), and passed through Tunnel #33 underneath the trestle.

A rail station, Corona, was established at the summit of the pass, with a red-brick and green-roofed dining hall, weather station, power station, and lodging. In the summer, the train ride from Denver to Corona was advertised as a trip "from sultry heat to Colorado's north pole"; tourists could stand in snowdrifts in the middle of July or August. Tours launched from the Moffat Depot, a small building constructed in the Georgian Revival style, featuring two-story-tall windows, intricate exterior brickwork, and roofline pommels. This building, located several city blocks northwest from Denver Union Station, was added to the National Register of Historic Places in 1976, and lay dormant for many decades after it was shuttered in 1947; in 2015, it was made the focal point of a senior living community center, after it was meticulously restored.

==== Weather and operational difficulties ====
Although the line was enclosed in almost continuous snowsheds (wooden tunnels) near the summit of the pass, trains were often stranded for several days (and in some cases up to 30–60 days) during heavy snowstorms because snow could fall or be blown through the wood planking of the sheds. Delays affected the timeliness of both newspaper and postal mail deliveries. Coal smoke and toxic gases collected in the snowsheds, causing temporary blindness, loss of consciousness, and sometimes death. Workers on the Moffat Road had an adage: "There's winter and then there's August", reflecting the fact that in the high mountains of Colorado, snow will often cover the area for more than six months, and very cold and snowy weather may occur nearly year-round. It was these heavy snowstorms that led to the financial demise of the Moffat Road and served as the incentive for the construction of a permanent railroad tunnel through the Rocky Mountains and into Middle Park.

Following scuba dives, no evidence exists that locomotive, rotary, or wreck debris rests at the bottom of Yankee Doodle Lake or Jenny Lake. However, many derailments, wrecks of Mallet locomotives, accidents resulting in injury or death, and losses of portions of rail manifests occurred on both sides of the pass:

Railroad Runaways, Wrecks, Derailments, & Accidents on Rollins Pass
Number	Side of Rollins Pass	Specific location	Equipment involved	Crew deaths	Crew injuries	Passenger injuries	Date	Cause	ICC Report Number
#1	West	The Loop	tender	–	–	–	January or February 1909	derailment	–
#2	Unknown	unknown	rotary	–	–	–	April 1909	derailment	–
#3	East	on a curve just above Antelope	Mallet No. 201, 10 coal cars, and caboose	4	1	–	January 1910	brake failure	–
#4	West	four miles west of Corona	two engines	–	–	–	July 1910	rockslide causing a culvert to sink causing a derailment	–
#5	East	east of Corona	freight engine	–	–	–	September 1911	derailment	–
#6	West	The Loop	runaway train, stopped before derailment	–	1	–	January or February 1912	runaway train	–
#7	East	"near Corona"	three freight cars	–	–	–	April 1912	derailment	–
#8	West	unknown	engine	–	–	–	January 1913	unknown	–
#9	East	unknown	rotary	–	–	–	February 1913	derailment	–
#10	East	near Jenny Lake	rotary	–	–	–	March 1913	derailment	–
#11	East	near Jenny Lake	rotary and several cars	–	–	–	March 1913	avalanche	–
#12	East	Dixie siding	box car with stuck brake	1	–	–	November 1913	fall	–
#13	East	Bogen sheds near Jenny Lake	rotary	1	2	–	January 1915	brake failure	–
#14	West	Ranch Creek Wye	freight train	–	–	–	December 1915	derailment	–
#15	West	Old Camp Six	12 loaded coal cars, Mallet helper, caboose	0	0	–	January 1917	brake failure	–
#16	West	Arrow	Engine 120 and the caboose from the rollback, above	0	0	–	January 1917	brake failure	–
#17	West	Ranch Creek Wye	passenger train and rotary collision	–	2+	1 (first passenger injury)	April 1917	damaged rail leading to a collision	–
#18	East	Spruce	freight train extra 118 and multiple coal cars	1	3	–	April 1917	brake failure	427
#19	East	inside Needle's Eye Tunnel	freight train	0	0	–	October 1917	derailment	–
#20	East	Yankee Doodle Lake, east of "Mount Corona"	rotary and engine	3	5	–	December 1917	avalanche	–
#21	Summit	Corona	rotary	3	–	–	February or March 1918	unknown	–
#22	East	Spruce	rotary	–	–	–	March 1918	derailment	–
#23	East	Ladora	freight train	–	–	–	June 1918	derailment	–
#24	West	snowsheds at Corona	freight train	0	0	–	October 1918	derailment	–
#25	West	Irving Spur	freight train	–	–	–	October 1918	derailment	–
#26	East	between Needle's Eye Tunnel and Jenny Lake	locomotive No. 100	2	1	–	January 1919	boiler explosion	–
#27	East	near Jenny Lake	freight train	–	–	–	January 1919	derailment	–
#28	East	near Jenny Lake	freight train	–	–	–	April 1919	derailment	–
#29	East	near Jenny Lake	four freight cars and the engine's tender	–	–	–	December 1919	avalanche	–
#30	East	near Jenny Lake	engine	–	–	–	April 1920	derailment due to ice	–
#31	East	near Jenny Lake	rotary	–	–	–	May 1920	derailment	–
#32	East	unknown	wooden gondola railcar	0	0	–	1913–1929	derailment	N/A
#33	East	Needle's Eye Tunnel	rotary	0	0	–	April 1921	derailment	N/A
#34	West	Riflesight Notch Loop	Mallet No. 208 and tender	4	2	–	February 1922	avalanche	–
#35	East	Antelope	two engines and 10–23 coal cars	2	–	–	December 1922	brake failure and fatigue	915
#36	East	inside Needle's Eye Tunnel	freight engine	–	–	–	December 1922	derailment	–
#37	West	Ranch Creek Wye	two coaches	–	–	–	July 1923	derailment	–
#38	East	near Jenny Lake	freight	–	–	–	August 1923	derailment	–
#39	West	Riflesight Notch Loop	Mallet No. 210	–	–	–	1924	derailment	–
#40	West	snowsheds at Corona	passenger train No. 2 and caboose	0	0	–	October 1925	fire	–

Despite the challenges documented above, by 1918, it was reported that 45 or 46 engines comprised the railroad's motive power, along with 3 rotary snowplows.

==== The Moffat Tunnel ====
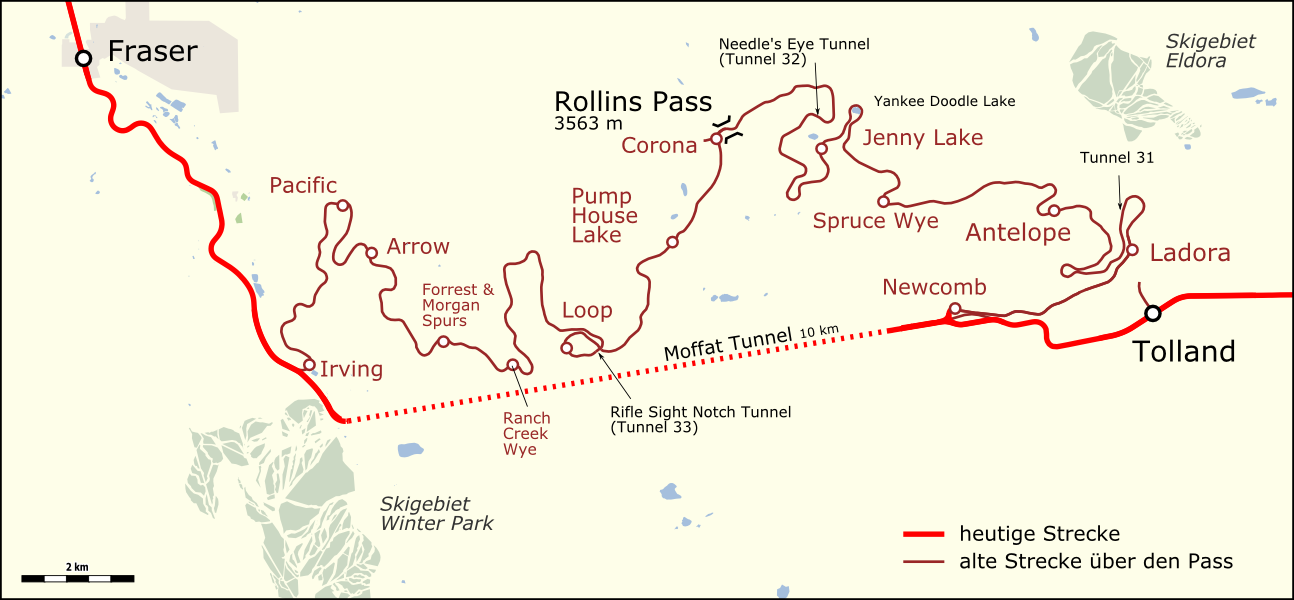
The winding inefficiency of the outdoor Rollins Pass rail route is brought into sharp contrast when compared with the direct, weather-agnostic Moffat Tunnel route. The Moffat Tunnel eliminated 10,800 degrees of curvature along the Rollins Pass route.

Several locations for the Moffat Tunnel were scouted before the selection of the present-day location; one possible location was identified at high altitude between Yankee Doodle Lake and the Forest Lakes.

Plans to build a longer tunnel at a lower elevation were better planned and financed; the single-track Moffat Tunnel opened just south of Rollins Pass on Sunday, February 26, 1928. The Moffat Tunnel eliminated 10,800 degrees of curvature along the Rollins Pass route; the tunnel resulted in considerable time savings as well as money that was used for snow removal atop Rollins Pass. After the first year of operations, an annual report to stockholders showed "marked savings in operating costs" by 24.86%. Savings were seen in other areas, including in fuel reductions ($89,074.45 savings; equivalent to $1,670,000 in 2025) and engine servicing ($156,188.89 savings), whereas gross tons per train hour increased by 34.84%.

After the Moffat Tunnel opened, the tracks over Rollins Pass remained in place; they were maintained at least as late as July 1929 as an emergency route. This emergency route was needed only once for a several-days-long closure: on Thursday, July 25, 1929, dry rot of wooden timbers caused a collapse and 75 feet (23 m) of rock caved-in and blocked the Moffat Tunnel near the East Portal. It took until Tuesday, July 30, 1929, for the tunnel to be cleared of debris. Permission to dismantle the rails on Rollins Pass was granted by the Interstate Commerce Commission on Saturday, May 18, 1935, and the rails were removed the following summer: the west side was cleared by Tuesday, August 11, 1936, and the east side 14 days later; contractors toiled non-stop, including overnight to remove both the rails and ties. A wye on the passing siding at the East Portal of the Moffat Tunnel is currently used for short-turning some modern services and marks the spot where the Rollins Pass line, if it still existed, would merge into the modern route.

The route through the Moffat Tunnel became part of the mainline across Colorado for the Denver and Salt Lake Railroad, later the Denver and Rio Grande Railroad, and now the Union Pacific Railroad. The Moffat Tunnel continues to be used for both Amtrak's California Zephyr, which provides service between Chicago, Illinois, and Emeryville, California, as well as for the winter and sometimes summer Ski Train that operated between Denver and Winter Park from 1940 to 2009; in March 2015 and from 2017 onwards, the service was rebranded the Winter Park Express.

The original 1922 law that authorized the construction of the Moffat Tunnel specified that it should also be used for automobile traffic, with automobiles being placed on a ferry of flatbed railcars. To date, this has not happened.

The pioneer bore used to construct the Moffat Tunnel originally was later converted into the Moffat Water Tunnel by Denver Water.

=== Rollins Pass as an air route and navigational waypoint ===
In the era of powered flight, Rollins Pass provides an attractive way to cross the Continental Divide between the west and the east at a relatively low point for aircraft. Not only does the enroute airway radial, Victor Eight, cross the pass, but also a rotating airway beacon was established in the mid-to-late 1940s and first appeared on aeronautical sectional charts in March 1948 as a star, indicating a beacon. The beacon and its supporting infrastructure have since been removed due to the introduction of the low-frequency radio range systems to replace visual navigational aids. The rough road that was once used to service and reach Beacon Peak at the Continental Divide branches off the Rollins Pass road and is closed to all forms of motorized traffic per the current Motor Vehicle Use Maps.

=== Rollins Pass as an historic automobile road ===
Plans to convert Rollins Pass into a historic automobile road were first published in November 1949. Several years later, on Saturday, September 1, 1956, Colorado lieutenant governor Steve McNichols opened Rollins Pass as a non-vital and seasonal recreational road. Each summer from 1956 to 1979, Rollins Pass served as a complete road over the mountain pass for automobiles until a substantial rock fall in Needle's Eye Tunnel in 1979 closed the path over the pass. In 1989, after several engineering studies and structural strengthening of the Needle's Eye Tunnel were completed, the road was reopened only to close permanently in 1990 due to a rockfall that injured a sightseer. Since July 1990, no motorized route connects across the Continental Divide, effectively making each side a dead-end uphill route that must be traveled again, downhill, to leave the pass.

=== Rollins Pass as a natural-gas pipeline route ===
In 1969, a natural-gas pipeline was placed on Rollins Pass. In the mid-1990s, Rollins Pass was closed for the installation of a 10-inch-diameter (25-centimeter) Xcel Energy high-pressure natural-gas pipeline. The pipeline, not always under marker, still exists and uses the pass to reach the Front Range by loosely following County Road 8 in Fraser, using much of Ranch Creek towards the Middle Fork of Ranch Creek below Mount Epworth, climbing the pass near Ptarmigan Point, and following much of the old railbed past Corona at the summit of Rollins Pass. The pipeline continues across the railbed towards and under the twin trestles, down the old wagon route on the spine of Guinn Mountain, and then towards Eldora. The pipeline undergoes internal inspections "at least" every seven years with the deployment of a smart pig inside the pipeline.

== Artifacts and features ==
=== Preservation of both prehistoric and historic records ===
A majority of Rollins Pass is located within the boundaries of two national forests—Roosevelt National Forest and Arapaho National Forest—and as such, is federal land. The Archaeological Resources Protection Act, the Antiquities Act, and other federal and cultural laws recognize the nonrenewable and vulnerable nature of cultural resources, and these laws protect and make it illegal to collect artifacts (including arrowheads, horseshoes, buttons, cans, glass or ceramic bottles, dishware and utensils, coal, railroad spikes, snowshed wood, railroad ties, and telegraph poles) from Rollins Pass. All artifacts—from the prehistoric to the historic^{‡}—on the pass are objects of antiquity and are being studied and documented by universities and government agencies. The material record of Rollins Pass is illegally carried away each year, some by poachers and others in the backpacks of well-intentioned visitors who want a souvenir; but once artifacts are removed, a place can never again reveal the mysteries of the past. Each artifact has important scientific and cultural value, and theft harms the historical record. Visitors are encouraged to preserve the area for future generations by leaving items in place and sharing photographs and GPS coordinates (if available) with researchers dedicated to telling the story of Rollins Pass, and an internet resource has been set up to aid with this project.

=== Enforcement ===
County sheriffs as well as United States Forest Service Law Enforcement personnel and staff routinely patrol and enforce natural and cultural resources on Rollins Pass as well as in other areas within the National Forest System.

=== Artifacts affecting the road prism ===
On both sides of Rollins Pass, the road prism contains both prehistoric and historic artifacts buried under the surface. Any improvements to the rough road through regrading, including paving, would first require extensive sectional archaeological excavations by the United States Forest Service. In several places, on or just below the surface, historical artifacts are covered with geotextile stabilization fabrics whose characteristics match the soil and the permeability of the existing roadbed.

=== Drystacks ===
There are several drystack retaining walls on both sides of the pass, built without mortar, helping ensure they retain soil but not water.

=== Ghost towns, settlements, and gravesites ===
There are several ghost towns on or near Rollins Pass, the most notable being Arrow, Corona, Ladora, the East Portal construction camp, Mammoth, and Tolland. There are also at least a half-dozen other established settlements, dating back to both the wagon road and railroad eras, scattered across Rollins Pass.

There are also several historic gravesites across Rollins Pass. One granite headstone at Arrow reads, "R.M. Smith | June 28, 1842 | Nov. 12, 1909." One marker near the Eldora Ski Area states that it holds two members of John C. Frémont's third expedition in 1845–1846, although this is disputed.

== Environment ==
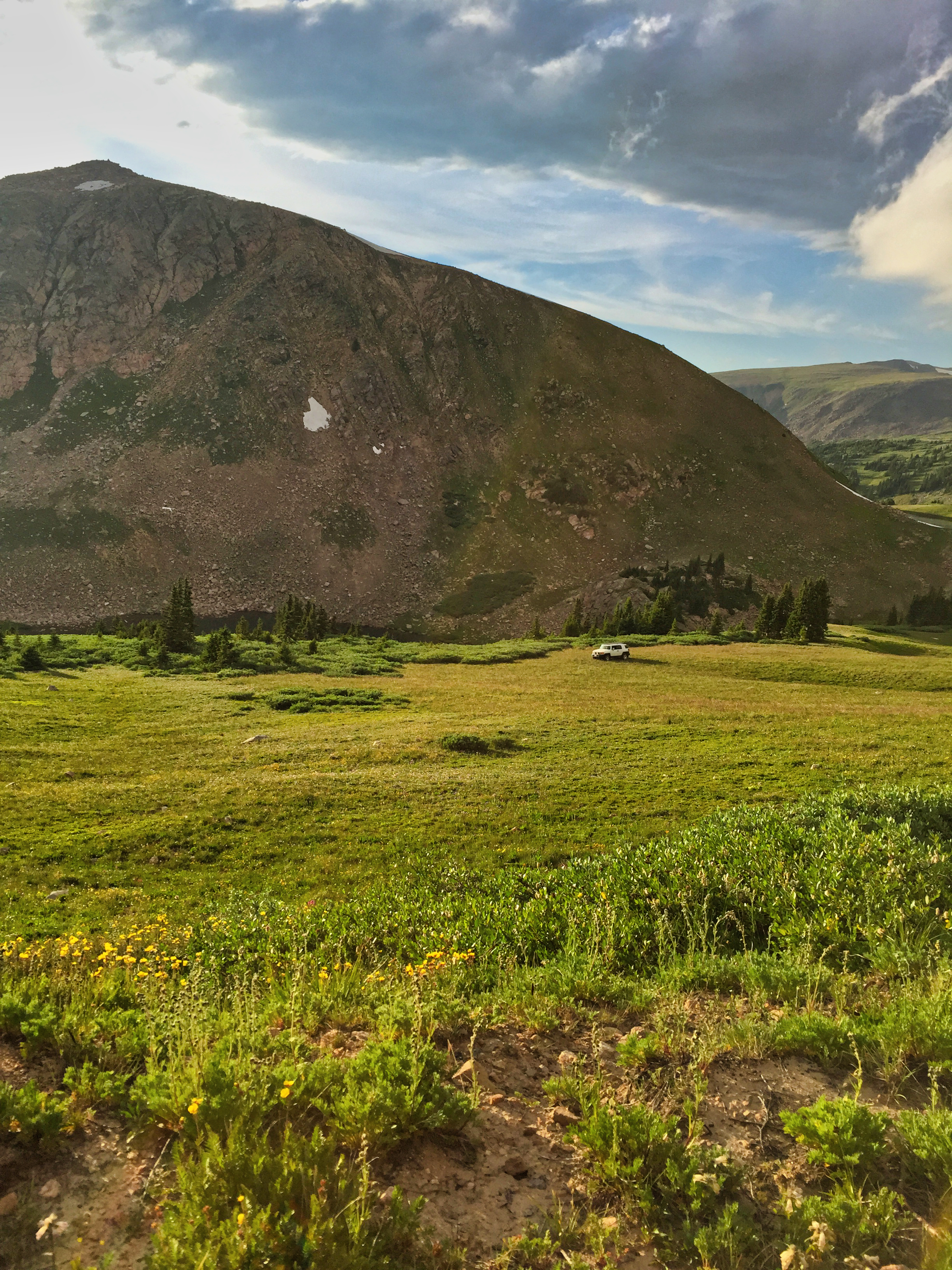
Illegal off-roading of a vehicle on Rollins Pass near Mount Epworth and Deadman's Lake. The alpine tundra is extremely fragile and can take 100–500 years to recover fully.

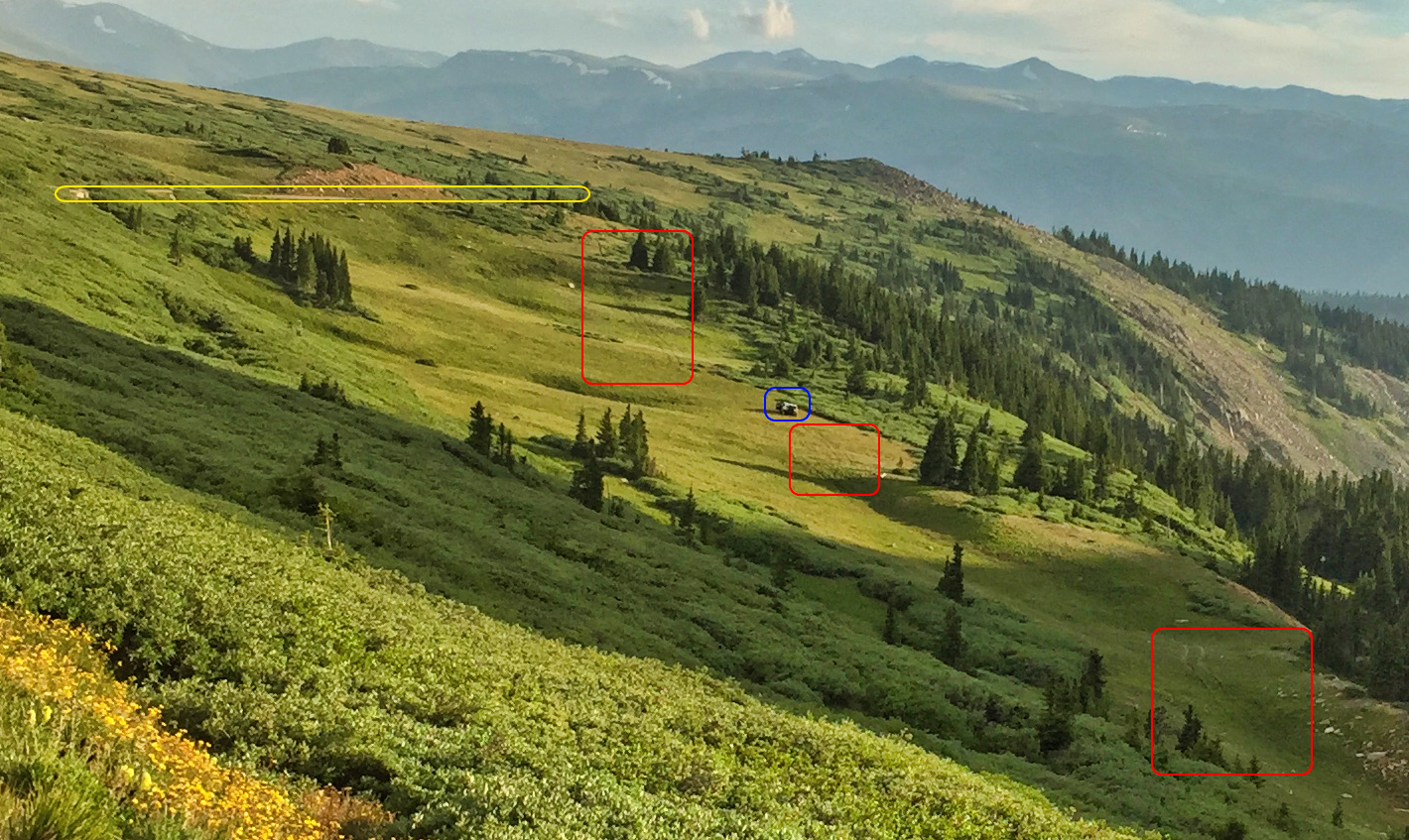
This annotated view shows the damage to the alpine tundra caused by illegal offroading on Rollins Pass. The vehicle is outlined in blue, the tire tracks in red, and the designated road in yellow.

=== Leave No Trace ===
Rollins Pass has unique floral, faunal, and riparian zones that spread across multiple Colorado counties; to best preserve the native environment of Rollins Pass, leave no trace and trail ethics apply to all visitors. Trundling is discouraged for safety and environmental concerns as well as to preserve artifacts.

=== Flora ===
Rollins Pass consists of several distinct floral environments, including lodgepole pine and quaking aspen at lower elevations, and krummholz at the tree line. Above the tree line, the landscape consists largely of small perennial wildflowers, cryptobiotic soils, and alpine tundra. The latter is extremely fragile and, if damaged, can take 100–500 years to recover. Leaving the trail can cause erosion, land degradation, possible species extinction, and habitat destruction, so vehicles, including off-road vehicles, are not allowed to leave the established road. There are at least two marked revegetation areas on Rollins Pass: one at Yankee Doodle Lake, and the other at the summit leading to the historic dining-hall foundation.

==== Pine beetle epidemic ====
The mountain pine beetle epidemic, which began in 1996 and continues to the present day, affects many forested areas in Colorado, including those on Rollins Pass. One out of every 14 trees in Colorado is dead. Trees affected by the beetles contain 10 times less water than healthy trees, and crown fires can quickly spread.

=== Fauna ===
The top predator in the area is the black bear (Ursus americanus), generally below timberline; however, it occasionally ventures above the krummholz. The bears prey on bighorn sheep (Ovis canadensis) and mountain goats (Oreamnos americanus), as well as yellow-bellied marmot (Marmota flaviventris) in the region. Above timberline, pikas (Ochotona princeps) are common. At or below timberline, both elk (Cervus canadensis) and mule deer (Odocoileus hemionus) are common. The presence of migratory bighorn sheep and other large game is the reason why Native Americans constructed sprawling yet intricate game-drive complexes on Rollins Pass.

The porcupine can be seen at all elevations on Rollins Pass, including at (and above) the summit. The porcupine begins its rounds at sunset, as it is nocturnal; this member of the rodent family also can climb trees adroitly.

Among birds, the white-tailed ptarmigan (Lagopus leucurus) are present on Rollins Pass, especially above treeline. Their seasonal camouflage is effective in the summer against exposed granite blocks and in the winter against snow, rendering them virtually undetectable. Brown-capped rosy finches (Leucosticte australis), rock wrens (Salpinctes obsoletus), and pipits are also seen or heard at timberline and near the summit.

=== Riparian zones ===
Nutrient-rich ecosystems exist on Rollins Pass where water meets the alpine and subalpine tundras.

==== Lakes ====
There are three lakes on the west side of Rollins Pass: Deadman's Lake, Pumphouse Lake, and Corona Lake. On the east side of Rollins Pass are King Lake, Yankee Doodle Lake, and Jenny Lake. Historically, Yankee Doodle Lake was referred to as Lake Jennie by John Quincy Adams Rollins, but modern archaeologists have re-interpreted this to be the modern day Yankee Doodle Lake; the railroad and period newspapers occasionally referred to this lake as Dixie Lake. Also in the vicinity are Bob Lake, Betty Lake, the Forest Lakes, Skyscraper Reservoir, Lost Lake, and Woodland Lake.

In 2010, Pumphouse Lake and Ranch Creek were assessed by the Environmental Protection Agency and were determined to be polluted.

==== Creeks and rivers ====
On the west side, in addition to the Fraser River at the start of Rollins Pass, are the South Fork of Ranch Creek, the Middle Fork of Ranch Creek (fed by Deadman's Lake), and Ranch Creek (fed by Pumphouse and Corona Lakes). On the east side of Rollins Pass, the South Fork of the Middle Boulder Creek is fed by Bob and Betty Lakes, and Jenny Creek is fed by both Jenny and Yankee Doodle Lakes; further downstream, Antelope Creek feeds into Jenny Creek. The South Boulder Creek runs at the start of Rollins Pass on the eastern side; but first flows through Buttermilk Falls, a large, 550-foot-long (170-meter) waterfall, near King Lake, visible from the summit and upper eastern portions of Rollins Pass.

==== Improvements ====
A summer 2006 project led by the United States Forest Service and having the participation of both environmental and user groups saw improvements made to wetlands, lakeshore, and upland habitats at Yankee Doodle Lake and Jenny Creek. Fencing was installed to restrict vehicle travel to designated routes and improve degraded areas. Before work could begin, sectional excavations by archaeologists took place to document the wagon-road-era settlements of the "Town of Yankee Doodle at Lake Jennie" at present-day Yankee Doodle Lake.

=== Wildfires ===
In the summers, wildfire danger increases due to various environmental factors: low moisture, lightning strikes, high winds, and human-caused factors. As the pass is a recreational area, wildfires can also be caused by unmanaged, unattended, and uncontrolled campfires.

==== Fire restrictions ====
In summers and early autumn, fire restrictions typically apply to the areas comprising Rollins Pass. These protective restrictions tend to be enacted starting as early as early June or later in August.

==== Nature-caused ====
- On Saturday, August 3, 1996, a lightning strike caused one of the easternmost wooden trestles near the summit to catch fire; fire crews extinguished the blaze before the trestle's integrity could be compromised. The wooden trestle was likely saved by the use of coal-tar creosote applied to treat and preserve the wood, as part of the Bethell process.

==== Human- or equipment-caused ====
- On September 27, 1915, Mart Wolf, owner of the Elk Creek Saloon, set fire to his establishment in the town of Arrow on the west side of Rollins Pass in the hopes of collecting insurance money totaling $1,000 (equivalent to $32,000 in 2025). Due to high winds, the fire quickly spread, and Arrow was all but snuffed out of existence.
- On Wednesday, October 30, 1918, a fire started at or near the boiler house (on the south side of the Corona shed) and fanned by 40-mile-per-hour (64 km/h) winds claimed the power station, telegraph system at the summit, along with several miles of track, snowsheds, as well as buildings at Corona, including the destruction of the water tank upon which the Weather Bureau's observation station was mounted. Train service over the pass, after the rails were relaid, resumed on Friday, November 1, 1918; snowshed reconstruction caused delays, yet continued through November and December. A new electric lighting system was installed at the summit the next year (1919). Box cars were used as temporary buildings as the workers' quarters (for watchmen and operators), the depot, telegraph office, eating house (not to be confused with the dining hall), and more were destroyed.
- In 1923, a train caused a wildfire on the east side of Rollins Pass on Giant's Ladder.
- On Thursday, October 15, 1925, passenger train No. 2, including caboose, was destroyed by a fire in the Corona snowshed; the fire consumed roughly 400–500 feet (120–150 m) of the snowshed.
- On Wednesday, January 26, 1927, the town of Rollinsville was nearly destroyed by a fire believed to have been started by a spark from a locomotive. Five buildings were destroyed, and 20 guests in the Rollinsville hotel lost their personal belongings when the hotel burned to the ground.
- On Friday, August 19, 1938, a human-caused fire was spread by high winds near the East Portal of the Moffat Tunnel. More than 700 men helped to fight the fire, which consumed at least 800 acres (320 ha) near Tolland.
- On Wednesday, August 4, 2010, a plane crash on the east side of the pass caused a small wildfire.

==== Unknown cause ====
- On Tuesday, July 30, 2019, a small, sub-acre fire ignited behind the Lakota subdivision on the lower portions of Rollins Pass; the fire was extinguished by the following evening.

== Climate ==
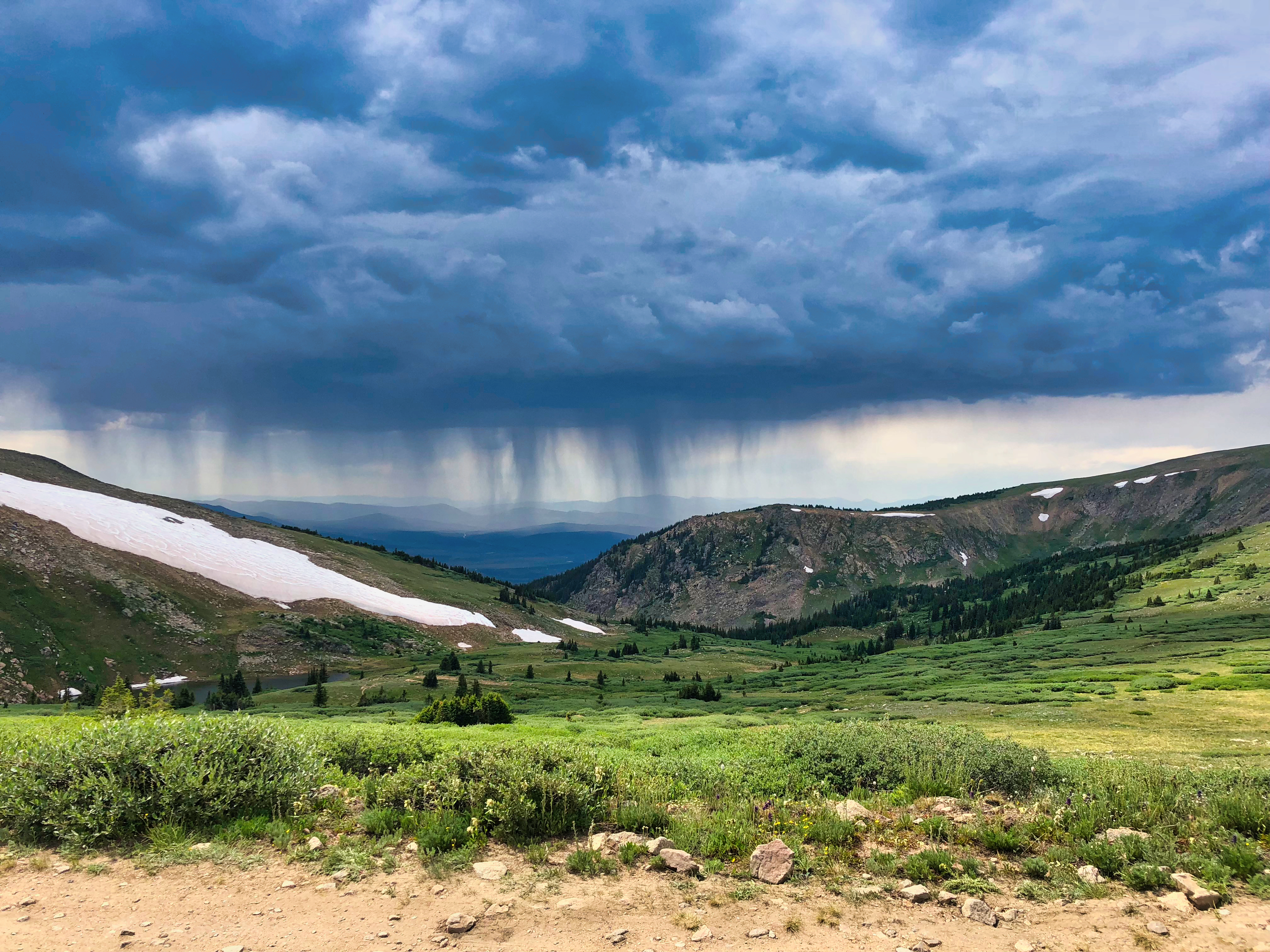
Summer thunderstorms form very quickly; above the timberline, exposure to electrical storms can be dangerous or deadly. This weather system was photographed on Sunday, July 8, 2018, on the west side of the Rollins Pass road, roughly halfway between the trailhead for Pumphouse Lake and the summit.

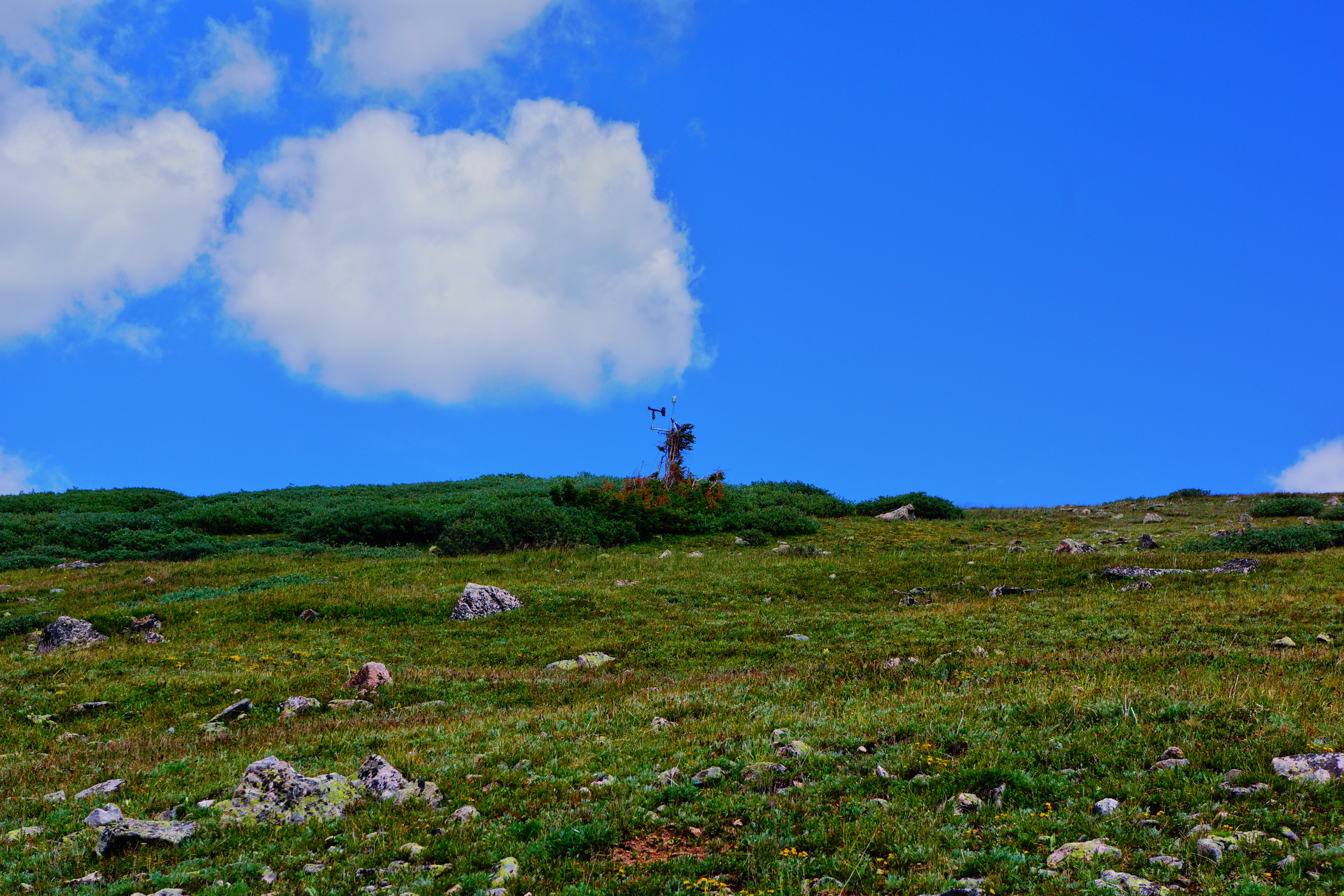
A small, solar-powered weather station is surrounded by native growth on the west side of Rollins Pass, located above Ptarmigan Point.

=== Seasons ===
==== Winter ====
Arctic conditions are prevalent during the winter, with sudden blizzards, high winds, and deep snowpack. High-country overnight trips require gear suitable for −35 °F (−37 °C) or below. The subalpine region does not begin to experience spring-like conditions until June. Wildflowers bloom from late June to early August.

==== Summer ====
Due to high elevation above the timberline in a backcountry setting, there is neither lightning protection nor lightning mitigation from sudden thunderstorms, resulting in a high-risk situation for visitors. The most suitable—but not best—refuge available from electrical storms would be in a metal-topped vehicle, as it would serve as a mobile Faraday cage.

=== Weather equipment and historical records ===
==== Historical ====
During the railroad era, a United States Weather Bureau observation station was mounted atop the large water tank at the townsite of Corona. Records from this station show "the prevailing wind direction was west, the lowest temperature recorded was −30 °F [−34 °C] (in February 1910), and the most monthly snowfall was in March 1912 with 72.5 inches [184 cm] of snow." Newspaper reports mention winds in excess of 60 mph (97 km/h), including at least one instance of 84 mph (135 km/h), and temperatures of −44 °F (−42 °C). Both these temperatures and wind speeds are in line with today's conditions in Colorado's high mountains.

==== Present day ====
A small, solar-powered weather station exists on the west side of Rollins Pass, located above Ptarmigan Point.

=== Atmospheric pressure ===
While temperature, humidity, and other factors influence atmospheric pressure, the atmospheric pressure on the summit measures roughly 457 torrs (609 hPa), while a standard atmospheric pressure measured at sea level is 760 torrs (1,010 hPa). At this pressure, many people, especially out-of-town visitors from lower elevations, can suffer from rapid dehydration and altitude sickness, also known as acute mountain sickness. Acute mountain sickness can progress to high-altitude pulmonary edema (HAPE) or high-altitude cerebral edema (HACE), both of which are potentially fatal.

Historically, newspaper reports wrote of both visitors and railroad workers experiencing heart attacks and pneumonia at the summit of Rollins Pass, as well as severe frostbite, including in July.

=== Avalanches ===
Human-triggered and natural avalanches are possible anywhere on the pass, and there have been four notable avalanches—three at Yankee Doodle Lake—on Rollins Pass:

==== Railroad era ====
- On Tuesday, January 27, 1914, sliding snow from Tunnel #32 "completely covered the track for a long distance" caused a multi-day blockage at or near Yankee Doodle Lake.
- On Monday, December 10, 1917, an avalanche near Yankee Doodle Lake swept a rotary and assisting engine 150 ft (46 m) off the tracks. The engineer of the assisting engine was "scalded about the head so badly that the bones of the face were exposed and he is not expected to live." Other railroad workers died, and several were injured.

==== Post-railroad era ====
Backcountry skiers, snowshoers, and snowmobilers are advised to check daily avalanche forecasts, practice diligent terrain management, and always carry and know how to use rescue gear, including emergency position-indicating radio beacons (EPIRBs).

• On Wednesday, November 28, 2001, two highly-experienced backcountry skiers triggered a sizable hard-slab avalanche in the Yankee Doodle Lake basin. From the accident report, "The avalanche released from a southeast-facing slope and fell 600 vertical feet [180 m] and stopped by crashing through the 10-inch [25 cm] thick ice of Yankee Doodle Lake. The displaced water resulted in a surge 10–12 feet [3.0–3.7 m] tall along the south shore." The avalanche pushed both men into the lake, and one survivor was sent 190 ft (58 m) into the lake's center. The survivor, suffering from hypothermia and frostbite, hiked five miles (8 km) to the Eldora Mountain Resort where he sought help. The search involved ground crews, air crews, avalanche rescue dogs, and trained dive-rescuers with specialized rubber suits. The body of the second skier was found 91 ft (28 m) offshore. Both skiers were well-equipped, including avalanche transceivers. Following the accident, each year in December, the Rocky Mountain Rescue Group holds a Joe Despres Memorial Dry Land Transceiver Training to include practices for using transceivers, along with avalanche courses, fundraising, and backcountry seminars.

• On Sunday, February 14, 2021, a 58-year-old male triggered an avalanche on the east-facing slope of Mount Epworth while snowmobiling and perished at Pumphouse Lake.

• On Saturday, January 7, 2023, two snowmobilers triggered a fatal avalanche on the eastern slope of Mount Epworth. One snowmobiler, age 58, was wearing an avalanche beacon—his body was recovered the same day; the other man, age 52, was not wearing one, and the recovery operation was postponed until the following day. The recovery operating involved the Grand County Sheriff's Office, Grand County Search and Rescue, Grand County EMS – Mountain Medical Response Team, Winter Park Ski Patrol Dog Team, Flight For Life Colorado, and the Colorado Avalanche Information Center (CAIC).

== Access ==
=== General information and seasonal recreation ===
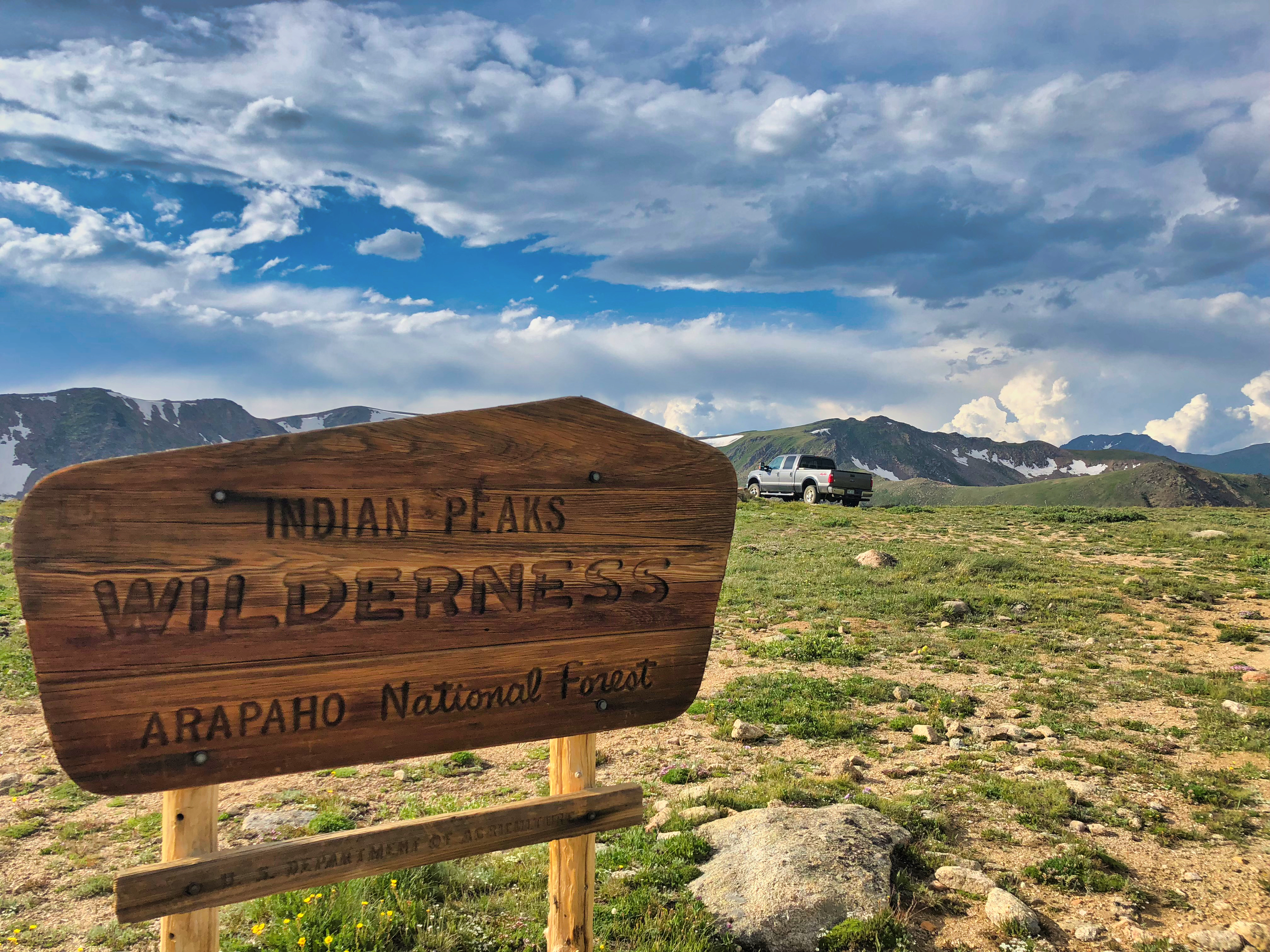
A vehicle has not followed the published Motor Vehicle Use Maps (MVUMs) and has parked inside the Indian Peaks Wilderness area, where motorized vehicles are prohibited. Fines can be as much as $5,000.

Rollins Pass is managed by the United States Forest Service as a recreational location and can be accessed from roads on both west and east sides; however, no motorized route connects across the Continental Divide. The entire road is unpaved (dirt and rock), has no guardrails, and has a speed limit of 20 mph (32 km/h). Current-year Motor Vehicle Use Maps (MVUMs) should be reviewed to determine which trails and roads are open to vehicles. Violators are subject to fines up to $5,000—"regardless of the presence or absence of signs"—and operating a vehicle in wilderness areas is prohibited. Buck and rail fences have been placed at select areas on the pass to indicate routes or areas closed to motor vehicles.

There are no facilities, shops, restrooms, call boxes, water fountains, trash receptacles, or shelters located on either side of the pass, except for the Årestua Hut, located on the northern side of Guinn Mountain at 11,000 ft (3,400 m) on the east side of Rollins Pass. The small hut was constructed in 1969 and is open year-round. A series of hand-constructed stone windbreaks exist above timberline north of Needle's Eye Tunnel—these structures date to the railroad era on Rollins Pass and are not prehistoric. These windbreaks currently lack upper coverings or roofs and serve only as aerodynamic dampeners for wind and wind gusts.

==== Winter ====
Both sides of the pass can be traveled by snowmobile when at least six inches (15 cm) of snow cover the road in the winter—generally beginning in late November or early December and lasting through early April.

==== Spring ====
Both sides of the pass are closed in spring—including several weeks in June—to any form of motorized traffic (including snowmobiles, automobiles, off-road vehicles (ORVs), all-terrain vehicles (ATVs), and motorcycles) for the prevention of road damage.

==== Summer and early autumn ====
Both sides of the pass can be traveled in good weather by motorized vehicles in the summer and early autumn. Rollins Pass is scheduled to open for vehicular summer traffic from June 15 through November 15; however, it is generally not possible given typical snowfall accumulations and slower melt rates in southerly-shaded areas, to drive higher than Sunnyside (site of the old block station) or Ptarmigan Point on the western side, or Yankee Doodle Lake on the eastern side, before early- to mid-July. In 2019, and in other summers when the prior season's snowfall has been late or considerable, mid-elevation gates on the west side of Rollins Pass remained closed on June 15 due to an order, "Extended closure due to snow, runoff, and road damage 36 CFR 261.54a."

The first high-country snowstorms bring fierce winds and create impassible snow drifts that are not plowed; this effectively puts higher landmarks—including the summit—out of reach as soon as late September or early October. On average, the near-annual presence of snow at or above timberline ensures the road is passable for less than 90 days per year.

Summer use of the pass is currently classified as "heavy" by the United States Forest Service, so parking can be very limited at designated parking sites. While the route mostly has gentle grades with switchbacks between two and four percent and does not contain loose gravel, four-wheel-drive higher-clearance vehicles fare better than two-wheel-drive vehicles, particularly in certain technical sections: some areas on the east side have grades up to 17.63%; the west side has some areas with a 15% grade. In all narrow sections, the vehicle heading downhill must yield to the vehicle traveling uphill.

=== From the north or south (along the Continental Divide Trail) ===
The Continental Divide Trail crosses the summit of Rollins Pass from south to north; the trail bisects the former wye at Corona and takes hikers through the Indian Peaks Wilderness past the dining-hall foundation at the summit.

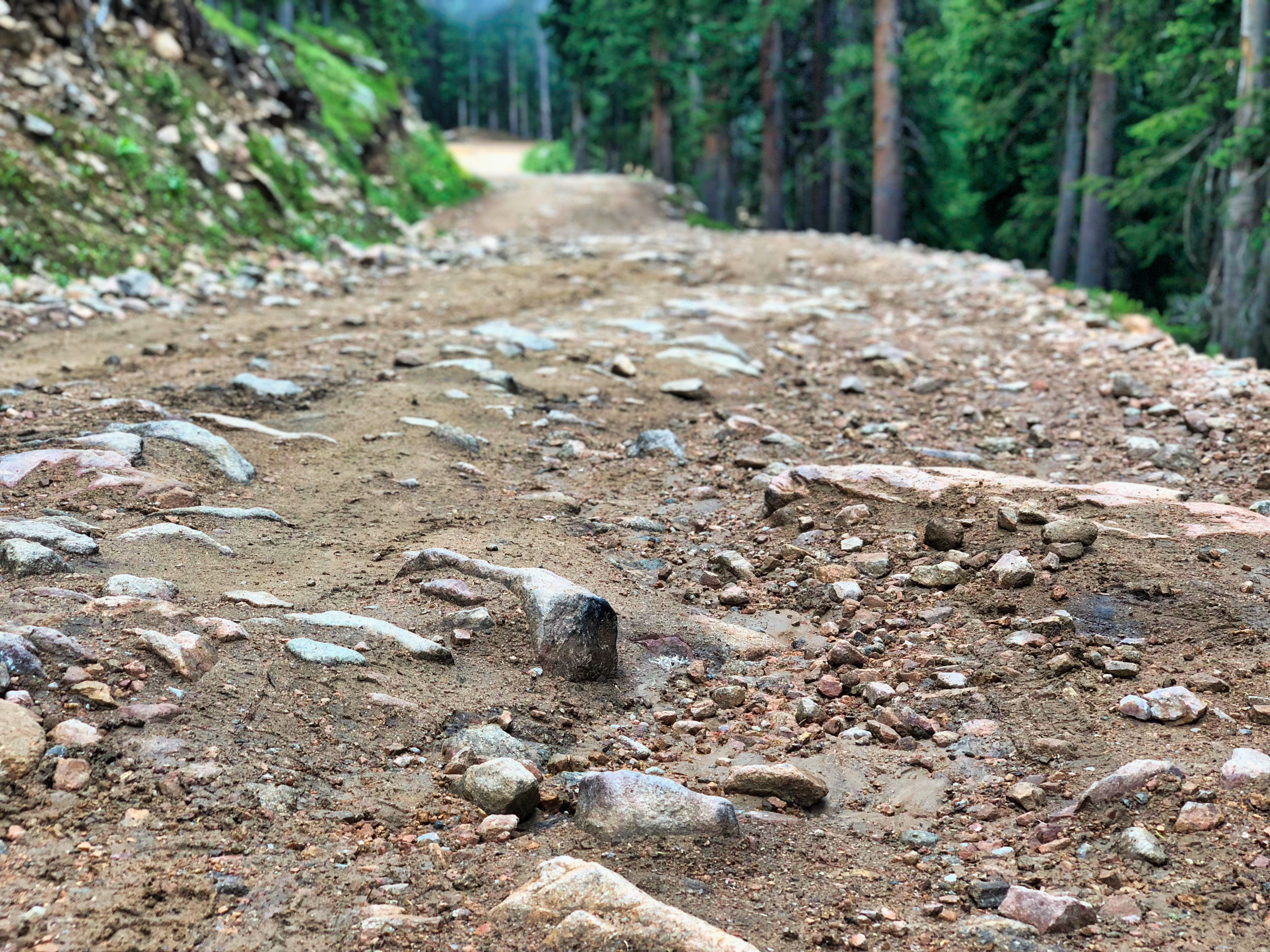
Typical summer condition of the road on Rollins Pass. This photograph was taken facing southwest on the road near the Riflesight Notch trestle on the west side of Rollins Pass.

=== From the east (near Rollinsville & Tolland) ===
The road up the pass on the eastern side from the Peak to Peak Highway (State Highway 119) begins at the East Portal road running west, parallel to South Boulder Creek and the current Union Pacific Railroad tracks, to the East Portal of the Moffat Tunnel, and then rises on the abandoned railroad grade from Giant's Ladder to the closed Needle's Eye Tunnel. From Rollinsville to East Portal, the road is an all-weather gravel road, with several chattery washboard sections, that can be traveled by regular automobiles. However, beginning at East Portal, at the formal start of Rollins Pass road (Forest Service Road 117), the road prism becomes very rough due to sustained sections of angular cobbles and potholes, the latter being several feet in size. The road has a level 2 road maintenance status, described as "assigned to roads open for use by high-clearance vehicles," with the following attributes: "surface smoothness is not a consideration" and "not suitable for passenger cars."

This former railroad bed is open for 11.7 miles (18.8 km); two miles past Jenny Lake, there is a concrete-filled steel road gate with large rocks and Jersey barriers approximately one half-mile before Needle's Eye Tunnel. A rough trail continues around either side of the tunnel for non-motorized transportation; the road is open for hiking and mountain biking beyond the barricaded portal of the tunnel toward the summit. No motorized route connects across the Continental Divide.

A majority of the lower portion of the east side of the pass is posted private property with no trespassing off either side of the road, as the properties belong to or are part of a conservation easement, Tolland Ranch, LLC and the Zarlengo Family Partnership, LLP as well as smaller land segments belonging to other entities. Shortly before the Spruce Wye, the land ownership transitions back to the Arapaho and Roosevelt National Forest, where it remains uninterrupted up to and including the summit and surrounding areas.

=== From the west (near Winter Park) ===
The road up the pass (County Road 80) on the western side from Winter Park starts from U.S. Highway 40 in Winter Park. It has several sections of angular cobbles and potholes of varying sizes, some several feet across. The road has a level 2 road maintenance status, described as "assigned to roads open for use by high-clearance vehicles," with the following attributes: "surface smoothness is not a consideration" and "not suitable for passenger cars."

The road is open for 14.4 miles (23.2 km) and terminates at the summit's parking area. At 0.15 miles (240 m) before reaching the summit, capable vehicles can turn right onto County Road 80 and continue via Forest Service Road 501.1—this rough road rises above and bypasses the summit for another 1.8 miles (2.9 km) before dead-ending overhead Yankee Doodle Lake at Guinn Mountain. No motorized route connects across the Continental Divide.

The entrance to and lower portion of Rollins Pass is owned by the Arapaho and Roosevelt National Forest; after roughly 1.65 miles (2.66 km), the land transitions to private property belonging to Arrowhead Winter Park Investors, LLC and the Denver, City & County Board of Water Commissioners, known more commonly as Denver Water. Shortly after the ghost town of Arrow and several miles before the Ranch Creek Wye, the land ownership transitions back to the Arapaho and Roosevelt National Forest, where it remains uninterrupted up to and including the summit and surrounding areas.

==== Guided tours ====
- Winter: Guided winter snowmobile tours follow much of the summer road from Arrow and terminate shortly after Sunnyside at Ptarmigan Point (located further uphill and past the Riflesight Notch trestle). Winter tours "top out at nearly 12,000 feet [3,700 m]" but do not go higher than Ptarmigan Point and do not reach the summit at 11,676 feet (3,559 m).
- Summer: Guided summer off-road (off-pavement) tours are also conducted on the west side of Rollins Pass; however, all tours are conducted on-road using off-road-capable vehicles, and any off-roading is strictly prohibited.

=== Incidents and accidents ===
Due to hairpin turns, steep terrain, and inclement weather, there have been several incidents and accidents, some fatal, on or near the Rollins Pass road:

==== Non-motorized ====
- On Tuesday, March 19, 1968, a young hiker was rescued near the Riflesight Notch trestle after hiking from East Portal to Winter Park without snowshoes, skis, or adequate clothing.
- On Wednesday, July 18, 2012, a woman was injured after losing her footing and sliding 200 ft (61 m) down a snowfield where she crashed into rocks at the bottom of the slope. The injured woman was taken via a Flight for Life helicopter to Denver.
- On Sunday, February 4, 2018, a backcountry skier fell, sustained multiple injuries, including broken bones, and became unconscious. His friend was able to call emergency services, but a helicopter could not land due to 70 mph (110 km/h) winds and blowing snow. Rescuers could not arrive for 10 hours.
- On Saturday, August 4, 2018, a backcountry skier fell approximately 300 ft (91 m) down Skyscraper Glacier on Rollins Pass, impacted rocks, and became unconscious. Search-and-rescue services were mobilized, and the 23-year-old skier was able to hike back to the summit.
- On Saturday, July 18, 2020, a backcountry hiker fell approximately 300 ft (91 m) down a scree slope on Rollins Pass, near Needle's Eye Tunnel, sustained serious injuries, and was found to be unconscious and unresponsive. Search-and-rescue services were mobilized, and the 57-year-old hiker was airlifted to Denver.
- On Monday, September 7, 2020, a 17-year-old backcountry skier fell while backcountry skiing on Skyscraper Glacier and smashed into rocks, resulting in a head laceration. Three flights were made over the course of the seven hour rescue, which involved Boulder County Sheriff's Office, American Medical Response, Nederland Fire Department, Timberline Fire Department, Rocky Mountain Rescue Group, Grand County Search and Rescue, Flight For Life Colorado, Colorado Army National Guard, and the Colorado Search and Rescue Association.
- On Sunday, February 21, 2021, a 47-year-old woman became lost while snowshoeing on Jenny Creek Trail towards Yankee Doodle Lake. Fifteen different search-and-rescue agencies were involved with her rescue, including Boulder County Sheriff's Office, Rocky Mountain Rescue Group, Front Range Rescue Dogs, Boulder Emergency Squad, Eldora Ski Patrol, City of Boulder Water Utilities Department, U.S. Air Force Rescue Coordination Center, American Medical Response, Colorado Search and Rescue, Nederland Fire Protection District, Northern Colorado Med Evac, Flight for Life Colorado, Colorado Division of Fire Prevention and Control, Regional Transportation District and Alpine Rescue Team.

==== Motorized ====
- In the winter of 2001–2002, a search-and-rescue effort to extricate men with "severe hypothermia" ended with a snowmobile wreck near Corona Lake. The wreck resulted in one man's thigh being broken in six places.
- On Saturday, August 23, 2003, a car illegally off-roaded on the Riflesight Notch Loop and required towing. The driver was fined $500.
- On Saturday, October 8, 2011, a car crashed into the South Boulder Creek off of Rollins Pass Road. The driver was pronounced dead at the scene, and the passenger was taken to the hospital.
- On Monday, February 18, 2013, a snowmobiler on the west side of Rollins Pass lost control of his machine on a groomed trail and struck a tree, where he was pronounced dead by search and rescue services.
- On Sunday, August 16, 2015, two girls—ages 11 and 12—were driving ATVs underage, went over a 150-foot (46-meter) cliff on Rollins Pass road, requiring the services of both an ambulance and a medical evacuation by helicopter.
- On Saturday, May 5, 2018, search-and-rescue services were called for an ATV rollover accident on the east side of Rollins Pass.
- On Saturday, August 17, 2019, sheriffs responded to a motorcycle crash on the east side of Rollins Pass; the driver was transported to the hospital.
- On Sunday, July 9, 2023, a motorcyclist had an accident resulting in a severe concussion. The party called for search and rescue services, resulting in 10 individuals on ATVs and a rescue helicopter; the injured party left the scene.
- On Thursday, August 10, 2023, a motorcyclist crashed and broke his leg on the east side of Rollins Pass. The rescue took approximately three hours, and the rider was transported by helicopter. The following agencies participated: Alpine Rescue Team, Boulder County Sheriff’s Office, Flight for Life, Gilpin Ambulance, Grand County Search and Rescue, and Timberline Fire Protection District.
- Week of January 1, 2024, two snowmobile wrecks occurred mid-mountain on Rollins Pass, where a 5-year-old girl and a 47-year-old woman "sustained significant traumatic injuries." First responders remarked that this was the second accident at the location within a week.
- Several motor vehicles have wrecked on Rollins Pass; yet these instances appear to have been done deliberately, as no news articles seem to be associated with these wrecks. Four wrecks are still visible on the east side of Rollins Pass—one car and one snowmobile on the first leg of Giant's Ladder near the start of the Rollins Pass road, one car near Guinn Mountain closer to the summit, and one ATV directly off the summit, downslope from the old pergola, on the eastern side of the Continental Divide (recovered in mid-September 2018). On the west side of the pass, a wrecked snowmobile can still be found at the southern slopes of Mount Epworth near the shores of Deadman's Lake.

=== Routes, trails, and closures ===
The complete pass is open and accessible for snowshoeing, fatbiking, backcountry skiing, and cross-country skiing in the winter and to hikers, bicyclists (including those on tandems and unicyclists), and horseback riders in the summer. Since July 1990, no motorized route connects across the Continental Divide, effectively making each side a dead-end uphill route that must be traveled again, downhill, to leave the pass.

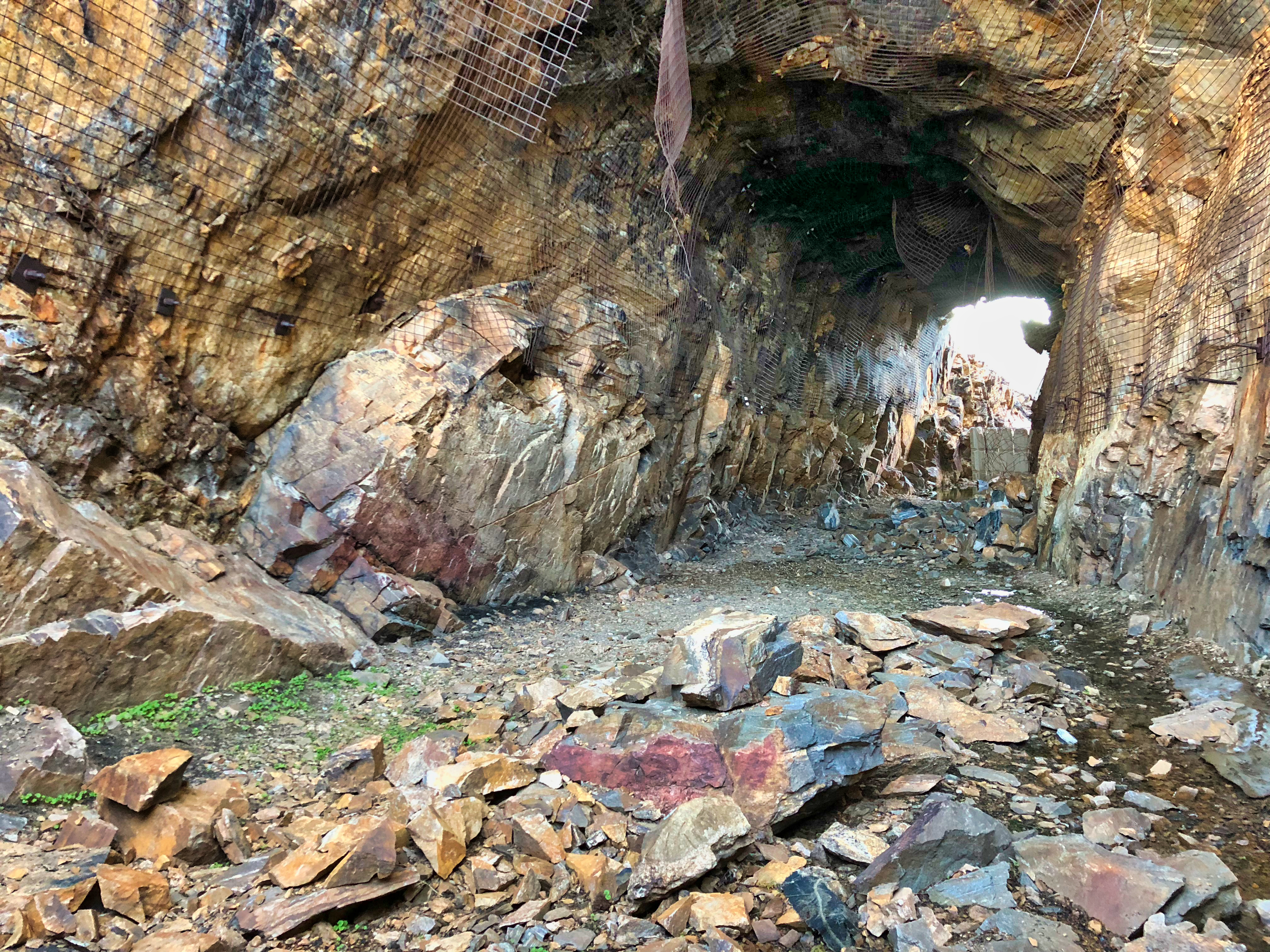
2018 photograph of Needle's Eye Tunnel, near the summit of Rollins Pass. This view shows the northeast portal in the foreground; the southwest portal is visible in the background. Wire mesh and metal dowels were installed in August 1987 to help reduce additional rock falls and preserve the condition of the tunnel constructed in 1903 (123 years ago).

==== Historic wagon route ====
For visitors in or on motor vehicles wishing to access and retrace the historic wagon route over the pass (from east to west), there are numerous closures, some permanent, and no motorized route connects over the Continental Divide at Rollins Pass:

- Near Rollinsville, the Jenny Creek motorized trail follows the historic wagon road on National Forest System Road (NFSR) Route Number 502.1 that connects with NFSR 808.1 terminating near Yankee Doodle Lake.
- The wagon road becomes NFSR 501 at Yankee Doodle Lake, and while this route can be hiked, it has a permanent closure for motorized vehicles of any type, and several switchbacks on the steeper parts of this route are within the Indian Peaks Wilderness boundaries. This area is monitored for violations.
- NFSR 501 connects above Guinn Mountain and becomes NFSR 501.1, which is 1.8 miles (2.9 km) long and connects to NFSR 149, near the summit of Rollins Pass.
- Near this point, the historic wagon route can only be followed on foot into Middle Park.

==== Railroad line ====
For visitors in or on motor vehicles wishing to access and retrace the old railroad line, the majority of the railroad route or right-of-way over the pass is open and intact with several exceptions, detailed below, and no motorized route connects over the Continental Divide at Rollins Pass:

- Some of the railroad trestles have deteriorated (at Riflesight Notch), have been destroyed (trestle #72.83 on the west side, by the FAA [then the Civil Aeronautics Administration] in 1953), or have been dismantled (trestles #51.00 and #54.48 on the east side). Per the current Motor Vehicle Use Maps, all extant trestles on the pass are closed to any form of motorized traffic, including motorcycles.
- Two railroad tunnels on Rollins Pass are completely caved-in: Tunnel #31 (the tunnel at Ladora) and Tunnel #33 (the Loop Tunnel at Riflesight Notch).
- Closures also include sections leading to Tunnel #32, Needle's Eye Tunnel—a 170-foot-long (52 m) high-altitude railroad tunnel constructed in 1903 and used through 1928. Surveyors looking to establish the automobile route over the pass in 1949 found and cleared considerable rockfalls at the northeast portal of the tunnel. The tunnel was open to automobiles, as part of the thoroughfare over the pass, from 1956 to 1979, for seasonal and inessential purposes. In 1979, the tunnel was closed due to rockfalls at the northeast portal; following a geologic engineering study in 1981, a Mine Safety and Health Administration study in 1985, engineering design work in 1986, and repair work in August 1987, the tunnel was re-opened in 1989. The following year, in July 1990, several thousand pounds of rock fell from the crown of the tunnel, injuring a United States Navy veteran and Denver firefighter resulting in a below-knee amputation. Since then, the tunnel was sealed by Boulder County officials along with the United States Forest Service, and sizable rockfalls continue to occur at the northeast portal, southwest portal, and center of the tunnel from both the crown and shoulder of the structure. In November 1990, the post-accident engineering report, by independent geotechnical consultant Ronald E. Heuer, PhD, cited restoration errors and faulty work: design specifications were not consistently followed, rock bolts were incorrectly spaced, and gravity along with seasonal temperature variations were also listed as factors in the accident.

==== Adopted trails ====
Several trails on Rollins Pass are adopted.

- East: NFSR 502 & NFSR 808 (Jenny Creek Trail and spurs), Rising Sun 4 Wheel Drive Club of Colorado
- West: N76 (Riflesight Notch Trail), authors of Rollins Pass

==== Administrative provision ====
In 2002, the James Peak Wilderness and Protection Area Act (Public Law 107-216) was passed by Congress and signed into law by President George W. Bush. The act amended the Colorado Wilderness Act of 1993 and designated lands within both the Arapaho National Forest and the Roosevelt National Forest as the James Peak Wilderness area and added lands to the Indian Peaks Wilderness, establishing these lands as federally protected territory. The act contained an administrative provision:

If requested by one or more of the Colorado Counties of Grand, Gilpin, and Boulder, the Secretary shall provide technical assistance and otherwise cooperate with respect to repairing the Rollins Pass road in those counties sufficiently to allow two-wheel-drive vehicles to travel between Colorado State Highway 119 and U.S. Highway 40. If this road is repaired to such an extent, the Secretary shall close the motorized roads and trails on Forest Service land indicated on the map entitled "Rollins Pass Road Reopening: Attendant Road and Trail Closures", dated September 2001.

Historically, both Gilpin and Grand counties have requested to reopen the road; however, Gilpin County has publicly withdrawn its support and opposes reopening the thoroughfare over the pass, as has Boulder County.

To date, only minor repairs (mostly washout repairs) have been made. The difficulties and expenses of making improvements to the road, including coordination of maintenance and reintroduced liabilities, coupled with intractable disputes surrounding the 1990 accident in the tunnel, have become contentious and ongoing issues; however, alternative routes using the Moffat Tunnel have been proposed.

==== Land exchange ====
A proposed land exchange in 2020–2021 between the US Forest Service and a private developer was halted by historic preservation professionals and advocacy groups. The proposal would have seen the "literal entrance to the western portion of Rollins Pass [...] become an entrance to a private development." The developer sought to trade 1,536–2,261 acres (622–915 ha) of land for 543 acres (220 ha) held by the US Forest Service. Rollins Pass holds resources in a National Historic District spanning Grand, Boulder, and Gilpin counties, and this land exchange would have damaged the historic district as well. This project had initial support from local leadership and economic influencers—including multimillion-dollar resorts—yet none of their letters of support mentioned Rollins Pass nor its cultural and non-renewable historic resources. Instead, community leaders mirrored the developer's letter to the US Forest Service, stating that the 543 acres "are squarely in the development path and are a logical place for future growth to occur." This land exchange was discussed in a 2022 book on Rollins Pass:

In recent years, the historic integrity of Rollins Pass has come under new threat from unsympathetic developers longing to build atop soils rich with history that hold panoramic views. Of late, one attempt at a land exchange with the US Forest Service would have transformed the entrance of the western portion of Rollins Pass into an opening, quite literally, for a private development. Advocates rallied on behalf of public lands, and for now, the area remains in public hands. Embarrassingly, continued pro-development aspirations and the failure to see beyond real estate values only reinforce the area's inclusion as one of Colorado's Most Endangered Places.

== Airspace and aviation ==
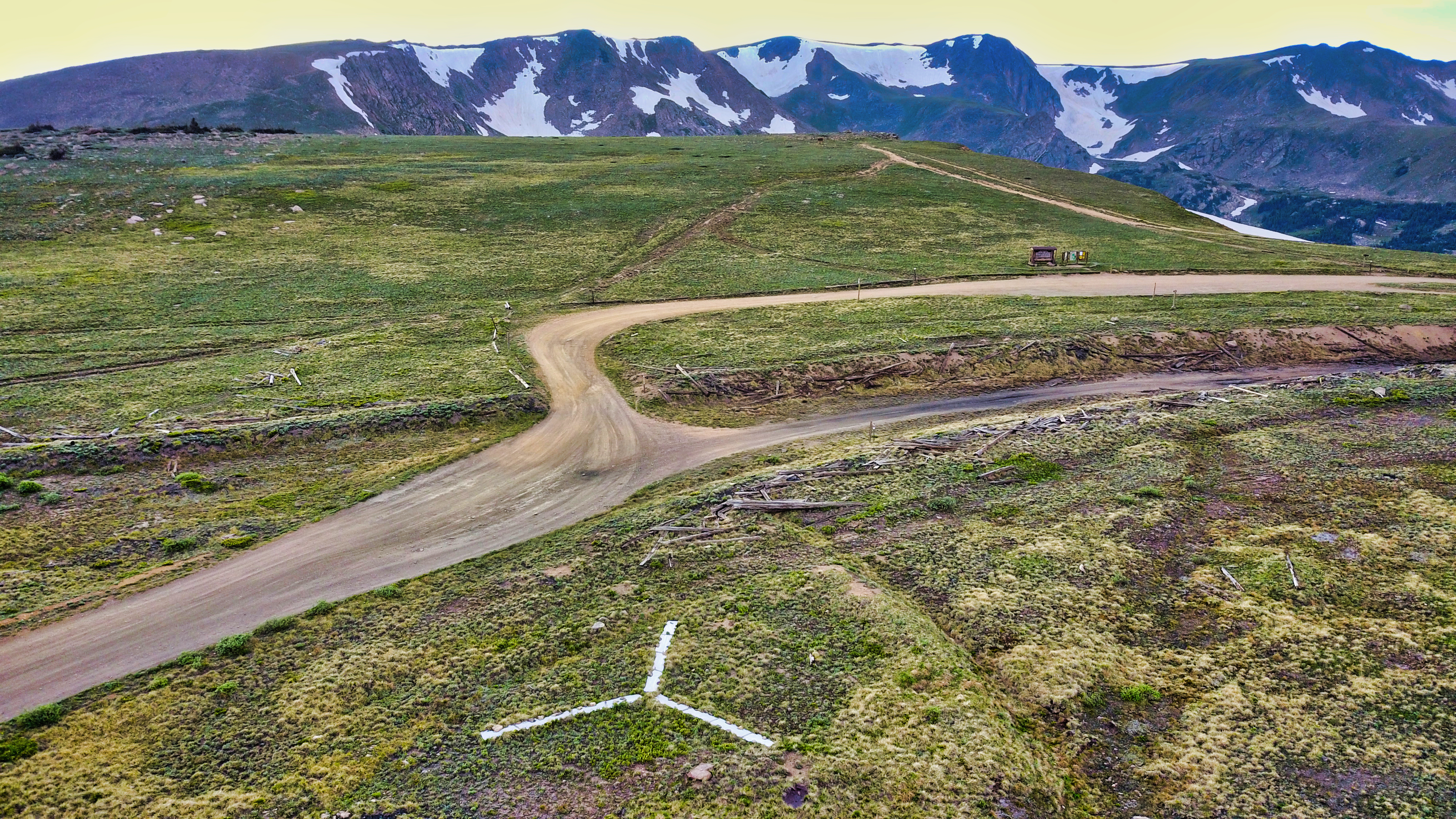
An aerial view of the emergency backcountry helicopter landing zone located at the summit of Rollins Pass; the white prong of the landing zone, furthest from the camera, points north. The comparatively low saddle of Rollins Pass is visible in this image as the summit itself (in the foreground and midground) is plainly lower in elevation than the surrounding mountains. The wood debris consists of both remnants from snowsheds that covered the tracks as well as discarded railroad ties that were removed from service in the summer of 1936.

=== Airspace ===
The entirety of Rollins Pass currently resides in Class G airspace. Per the FAA Pilot's Handbook of Aeronautical Knowledge, "Although ATC has no authority or responsibility to control air traffic, pilots should remember there are visual flight rules (VFR) minimums that apply to Class G airspace."

=== Airway Victor Eight ===
Rollins Pass is traversed by a low altitude enroute airway radial, Victor Eight; the width of the airway is 4 nautical miles (4.6 mi; 7.4 km) on either side of the centerline which skirts the summit of the pass. Pilots have recommended to avoid the area in bad weather due to extreme downdrafts, mountain waves, and turbulence on the east side of the pass.

=== Drone operations ===
Drone (UAS) flights are permissible in Class G airspace over Rollins Pass, provided all flights adhere to the FAA's regulations for recreational or commercial drone flights. The one major restriction is that drones cannot take off from, land in, or be operated from congressionally designated wilderness areas. Remote pilots and drone enthusiasts should exercise extreme caution, as the enroute airway radial brings fast-moving aircraft within the area, including Flight for Life helicopters, aerial firefighting aircraft, search-and-rescue helicopters, and high-speed military aircraft, many of which fly below 500 feet (150 m) AGL.

=== Emergency landing zone ===
A non-illuminated summer emergency backcountry helicopter landing zone exists at the summit, placed sometime between September 1999 and October 2005.

=== Rotating airway light beacon (Beacon 82) ===
A rotating airway light beacon (Beacon 82 on aeronautical charts) was placed very near the summit of Rollins Pass atop what was then later termed Beacon Peak, in the mid-to-late 1940s at an approximate elevation of 12,080 feet (3,680 m). The glass-domed lighted beacon rotated six times per minute, marking the airway between Los Angeles and Denver, and it held a two-million-candlepower electric lamp with a 24-inch (610 mm) parabolic reflector. The beacon was removed in the late 1960s and is currently in storage (not on display) at the Pioneer Village Museum in Hot Sulphur Springs, Colorado; however, an 11-by-9-foot (3.4 by 2.7 m) concrete foundation remains near the top of the peak, along with the leg stubs used for the beacon's lattice tower.

=== Accidents and incidents ===
There have been many documented airplane and helicopter crashes on and near Rollins Pass:

- On Sunday, August 21, 1949, two people were killed instantly when their plane crashed on Rollins Pass.
- On Wednesday, January 6, 1954, a single engine airplane—a Beechcraft C35—with a tail number of N792D crashed on a shoulder of Guinn Mountain near Yankee Doodle Lake on the east side of Rollins Pass.
- On Saturday, March 3, 1962, a Beechcraft 35 with a tail number of N430B crashed near Rollins Pass close to Jenny Creek.
- On Tuesday, March 6, 1962, a Bell UH-1 Iroquois military helicopter with a tail number of AF91635 crashed near Rollins Pass close to Jenny Creek.
- On Friday, January 24, 1964, a single-engine airplane, with a tail number of N4351N, crashed in turbulent, cloudy, and stormy conditions near the Riflesight Notch Loop on Rollins Pass. One pilot and three passengers of the Cessna 195 were killed on impact, and recovery did not occur until August 20 that year.
- On Monday, July 11, 1966, a nonscheduled operation of an Alamo Airways De Havilland 104-6A, with a tail number of N1563V, impacted a mountainside in turbulent, cloudy, and stormy conditions on Rollins Pass. The crash of this dual engine plane occurred upslope of Deadman's Lake, opposite Mount Epworth at the crest of the Continental Divide. Upon impact, the plane did not catch fire, presumably due to low fuel reserves, and was completely disintegrated; recovery efforts salvaged all debris except for the front landing gear as it could not be located. To date, the nose wheel still has not yet been located. Two crew and one passenger were killed.
- On Saturday, January 3, 1970, a Cessna 172 with a tail number of N7104A crashed into an alpine lake at "11,700 [sic] feet" near Rollins Pass, killing both aboard.
- On Tuesday, December 14, 1971, a single-engine AT6 trainer crashed near Rollins Pass, killing the pilot.
- On Saturday, September 14, 1974, a pilot and his passenger crashed near Rollins Pass.
- A helicopter pilot crashed near the Riflesight Notch Trestle on the western side of Rollins Pass on Friday, July 30, 1982. The pilot was later charged with reckless endangerment.
- On Wednesday, December 30, 1998, a single-engine airplane—a Piper PA-28 Cherokee—made an unplanned forced landing on the east side of Rollins Pass in the midst of extreme wind and low visibility conditions. A cross-country skier was able to phone for a rescue, conducted by snowmobile, of the two passengers and one pilot who were injured; all three survived and were released from the hospital that evening.
- On Sunday, July 30, 2006, a single engine airplane, with a tail number of N5232X, crashed in clear conditions on Rollins Pass, approximately equidistant from Bob, Betty, and King Lakes. The two occupants of the 1969 American Champion 7KCAB were killed on impact.
- On Wednesday, August 4, 2010, a single-engine airplane, with a tail number of N8974A, crashed in clear conditions on Rollins Pass, near Jenny Creek, southeast of Yankee Doodle Lake. All three occupants of the 1951 Beechcraft C35 airplane were killed on impact.

== In popular culture ==
=== Film, music, and books ===
- Country music artist Tracy Byrd recorded a music video for the 1996 single Big Love, which featured sights on the west side of Rollins Pass, including Ptarmigan Point, Mount Epworth, Deadman's Lake, Riflesight Notch trestle, and more. The album cover pictures the artist himself in front of a scenic backdrop that can be seen at the summit of Rollins Pass, looking northeast; the back of the album features the artist holding his guitar while seated on a rock outcropping near the railroad-era dining-hall foundation at the summit.
- The Metro-Goldwyn-Mayer 1925 silent film The White Desert, starring Claire Windsor as Robinette McFarlane and Pat O'Malley as Barry Houston, was filmed on Rollins Pass in the winter of 1922 and released on Monday, May 4, 1925. The film features moving pictures of long trains ascending the Riflesight Notch trestle and of rotary snowplows in action between Ptarmigan Point and the summit. The railroad imagery appears only at the beginning and end of the movie, in dramatic scenes (mostly indoor or pseudo-outdoor), with both dialogue intertitles and expository intertitles filling most of the film's runtime. The film is considered to be rare and has historical significance due to the footage of trains and rotaries operating on Rollins Pass.^{††}
- The 1928 Metro-Goldwyn-Mayer silent drama film The Trail of '98 was filmed in part on Rollins Pass as well as inside the Moffat Tunnel using specialized lighting. The film was directed by Clarence Brown and starred Harry Carey as Jack Locasto.
- In the late 1920s, movie producers scouted Rollins Pass as a possible location for a third motion picture.
- On Saturday, November 3, 2012, Colorado State University archaeology professor Dr. Jason M. LaBelle and colleague Dr. Pete Seel debuted their documentary film Stone and Steel at the Top of the World, which describes the ancient hunters of the Colorado high country as well as the Moffat Road railway. As part of a Rollins Pass Mini-Film Fest event at Colorado State University, the documentary was shown before a rare screening of The White Desert in Fort Collins, Colorado. This occasion marked the first time Reginald Barker's silent film had been shown since 1978.
- On Saturday, May 12, 2018, LaBelle and the authors of multiple archaeological and research-based publications on Rollins Pass, B. Travis Wright, MPS and Kate Wright, MBA, held a book launch event and presentation for Rollins Pass titled, Rollins Pass: Through the Lens of Time that included an encore screening of Stone and Steel at the Top of the World as well as a rare screening of The White Desert at the Alamo Drafthouse Cinema in Littleton, Colorado. At the event, as a central part of the authors' founding movement Preserve Rollins Pass, the authors discussed the importance of leaving artifacts in place and their efforts to build a database of the GPS locations of prehistoric and historic artifacts that is made available for the benefit of archaeologists and land managers. They also revealed The John Trezise Archive for Rollins Pass Imagery—it "holds the largest known collection of high-resolution historical images devoted specifically to Rollins Pass. Assembled through contributions from many individuals, its holdings are cataloged to support research and retrieval, digitally preserved to reduce the risk of loss, and made available upon request through partnerships with museums, libraries, authors, researchers, and other institutions."
- The 2018 Peak to Peak Chorale's spring musical told "the tale of a train trapped for days by a spring blizzard atop Rollins Pass in the 1900s." The singers, musicians, and actors portrayed the passengers and crew that departed from The Stage Stop (in Rollinsville, Colorado) and became stranded when a huge rotary snowplow stopped working.

=== Places and landmarks ===
- Some ski runs (and one chairlift) at the nearby Winter Park Resort are named after Rollins Pass itself (Rollins Ridge, Corona Way), features on Rollins Pass (Riflesight Notch, Rainbow Cut, Needle's Eye, Phantom Bridge, Sunnyside, Lower Arrowhead Loop, Upper Arrowhead Loop), or are inspired by general railroad terminology (Runaway, Trestle, Sleeper, Boiler, Coupler, Railbender, Derailer, Re-Railer, Whistlestop, Hook Up, Sidetrack, Gandy Dancer, Iron Horse, Black Coal, Switchyard, Golden Spike, Brakeman, Vista Dome, Roundhouse, Narrow Gauge, Zephyr).
- Winter Park Resort's summer downhill mountain bike park is called Trestle.
- Some of Winter Park Resort's buildings and services infrastructure are named after features on Rollins Pass (Mount Epworth), the neighboring Moffat Tunnel (West Portal), and general railroad terminology (Zephyr).
- Two ski runs at the nearby Eldora Ski Resort are named after Rollins Pass: Corona and Corona Road along with the Corona Lift chairlift.
- A real-estate development in downtown Winter Park, next to Volarios Italian Restaurant, has been named after the town of Arrow on Rollins Pass.
- The Ski Idlewild featured several runs named after geographic landmarks of Rollins Pass and railroad terminology, including Arrow, Yankee Doodle, and Gandy Dancer.

=== Recreation ===
- For the past 60 years—since July 1966, the Epworth Cup has been one of the nation's longest-running downhill skiing races held annually in early-to-mid July (usually the Sunday following Independence Day) on Mount Epworth.
- On Thursday, May 10, 2018, it was announced that the Indian Peaks Traverse, a single-track trail of at least 60 miles (97 km) open only to "hikers, bi[cyclists], horseback riders and any other form of non-motorized transport" will traverse a portion of Rollins Pass and was slated for a soft-opening in 2022.
- In June 2019, a digital magazine's photo shoot featuring summer mountain gear occurred at (and near) the historic cabins at East Portal.
- On Thursday, January 30, 2020, the five remaining East Portal Camp Cabins (located at the East Portal of the Moffat Tunnel adjacent to Rollins Pass) were classified by Colorado Preservation, Inc. as one of Colorado's Most Endangered Places.
- Equipment outfitters use Rollins Pass as a testing ground for gear.

=== Equipment ===
- The Denver & Salt Lake Railway Derrick No. 10300 that helped clear wrecks more than a century ago on Rollins Pass is now housed in Granby, Colorado, at the Moffat Road Railroad Museum.

=== Science and archaeology ===
- In July 2016, the United States Forest Service held a Passport in Time project on Rollins Pass where volunteers joined "Heritage Program staff from the Arapaho and Roosevelt National Forests/Pawnee National Grassland (ARP) for an archaeological survey along the known trajectory of Moffat [R]oad."

== See also ==
- Colorado mountain passes
- National Register of Historic Places listings in Boulder County, Colorado
- National Register of Historic Places listings in Gilpin County, Colorado
- National Register of Historic Places listings in Grand County, Colorado

== Notes ==
†.No passenger lives were lost during the years Rollins Pass served as a railroad; the Passenger deaths column reflects this fact with a value of N/A for each row.
‡.For archaeology projects where federal laws apply, patterned cultural activity or features older than 50 years are considered historic.
††. Otto Perry's Moffat Route DVD, released on July 13, 2006, contains select motion picture rotary footage from The White Desert.
