= Forest Service Road System =

Rural road system in the United States

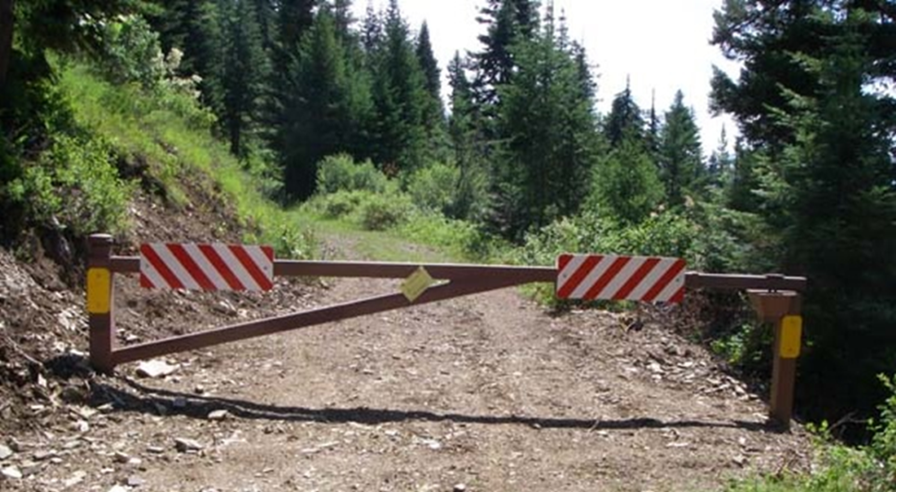
A gated entrance to a Forest Service road

The Forest Service Road System is a collection of rural and forest roads built and maintained by the United States Forest Service (USFS). Originally built with logging in mind, today the system is used primarily for recreation, although use for logging and wildfire control does still occur.

The system was created in the 1910s and grew continuously until the 1980s when construction decreased and more focus was placed on environmental impact. New road construction was halted in many areas in 2001 with the passage of the Roadless Area Conservation Rule but is set to resume after the rule was repealed by the Trump administration in 2025.

== Description ==
The Forest Service Road System consists of more than 380,000 miles (610,000 km) of roads, with a majority over 70 years old as of 2026. Due to the large amount of roads and comparatively low budget, only about 20% of what would be required, many roads are in disrepair. In terms of total lane miles, the USFS manages more road than all but two states (California and Texas), and it is eight times the length of the Interstate Highway System.

Less than a quarter of all Forest Service roads are maintained for passenger cars, and only about 7% were two-lane or asphalt-surfaced as of 1998. In 2000, an estimated 1.7 million recreational vehicles used Forest Service roads each day, with 80% of that on just 20% of the system. The USFS breaks the roads into five maintenance levels, with levels 3–5 acceptable for passenger cars. Roads in maintenance level 2 are maintained for high clearance vehicles, and level 1 roads are closed to vehicle use entirely.

Forest Service roads are not legally classified as public roads, despite many being open to public use. The Forest Service may designate a road as public, but most roads are authorized only for the administration, protection, and utilization of National Forest System lands. Some public forest roads may be closed seasonally to prevent damage to the road, or may have other restrictions, such as only allowing high-clearance vehicles. The Motor Vehicle Use Map (MVUM) was created by the Forest Service as part of the 2005 Final Travel Management Rule and displays National Forest System routes or areas open to motorized travel, including many Forest Service roads. Roads not on the MVUM are not open to the public.

Today, Forest Service roads must be constructed and maintained in a way that considers the protection of endangered species and their habitats, water sources, and archeological resources. This was not always the case, and many roads built in the past now cause issues for the local environment. Forest Service roads were identified as a major source of sediment and soil erosion in forest watersheds, which can damage habitat and degrade water quality.

== History ==
Before 1913, lacking authority and funding, the Forest Service did not build roads. This changed in 1913 when Congress allowed the agency to spend up to 10% of their national forest budget on roads and trails. The money had to be spent in the state from which the National Forest funds were taken. Following the Federal Aid Road Act of 1916, construction on the road system expanded. During the Great Depression, the Forest Service shifted away from trails in favor of roads and hosted hundreds of Civilian Conservation Corps (CCC) camps across the nation. The CCC built many of the roads using the recently invented bulldozer. These roads were primarily used for fire control. By the start of World War II in 1939, the road system was about 100,000 miles (160,000 km) long.

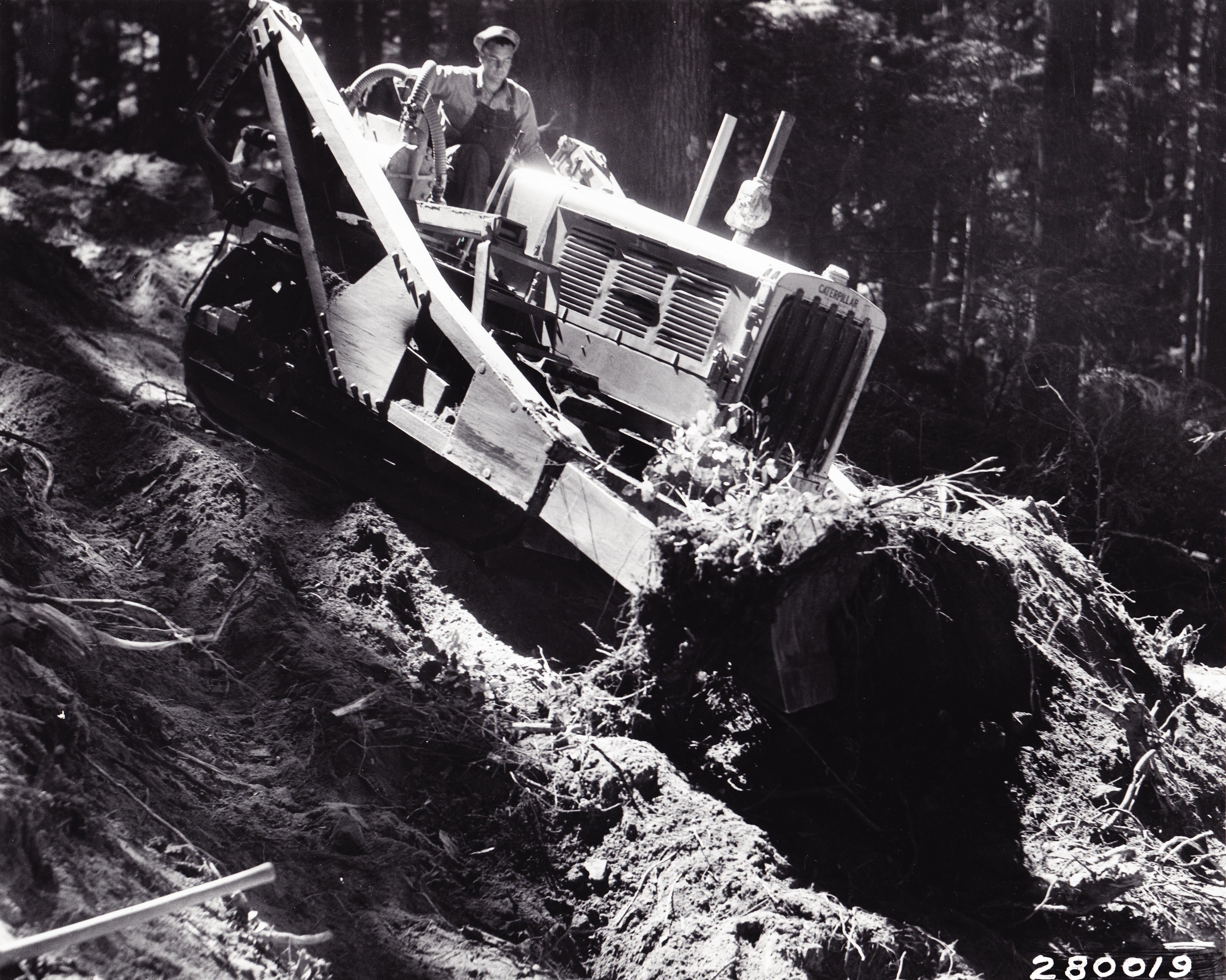
Using a bulldozer to clear stumps

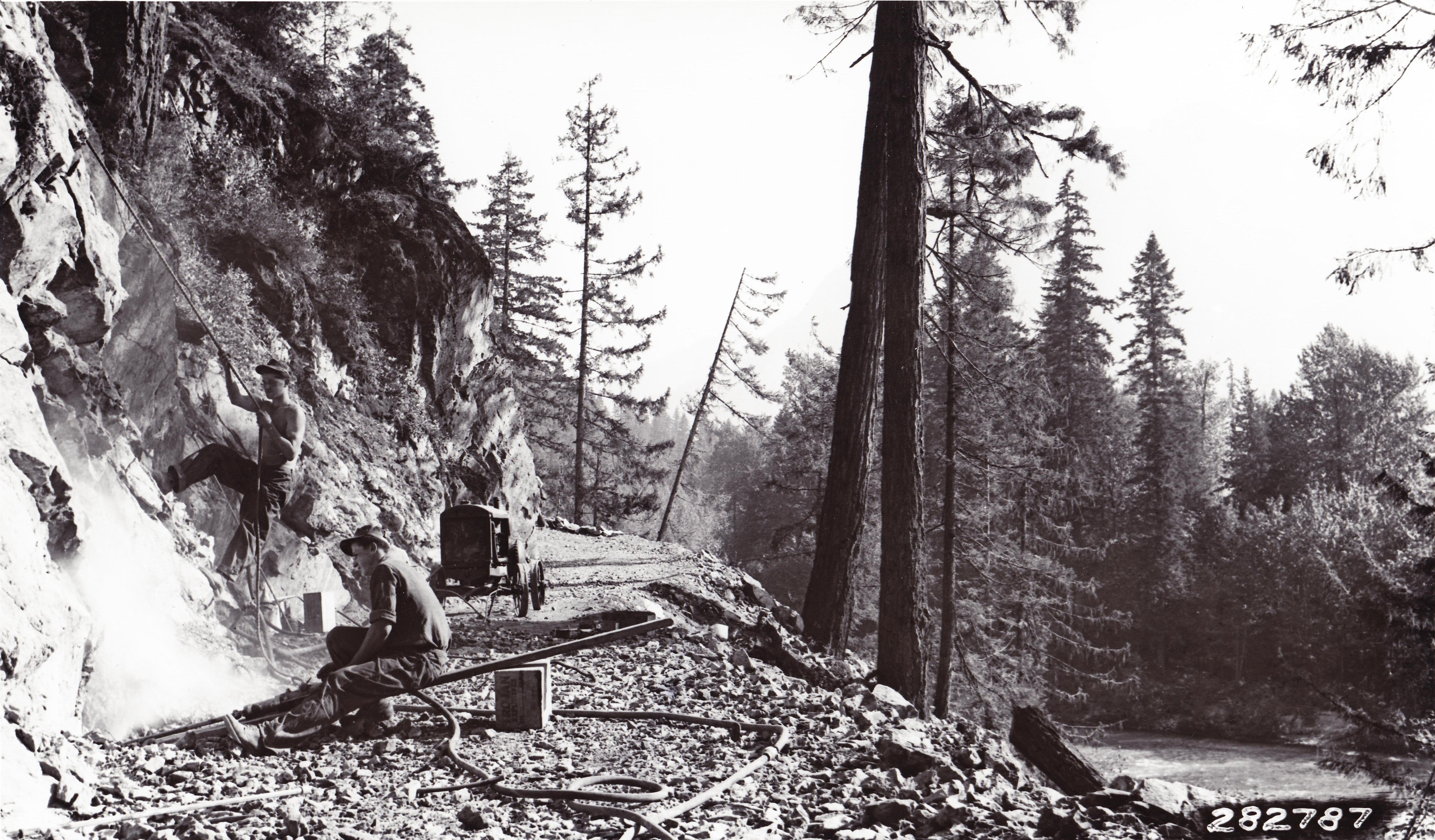
Using power tools to clear rocks

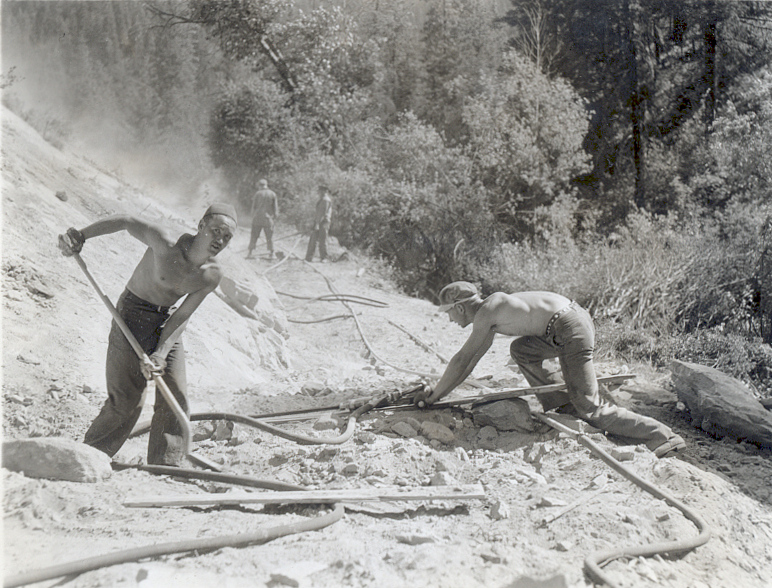
Leveling

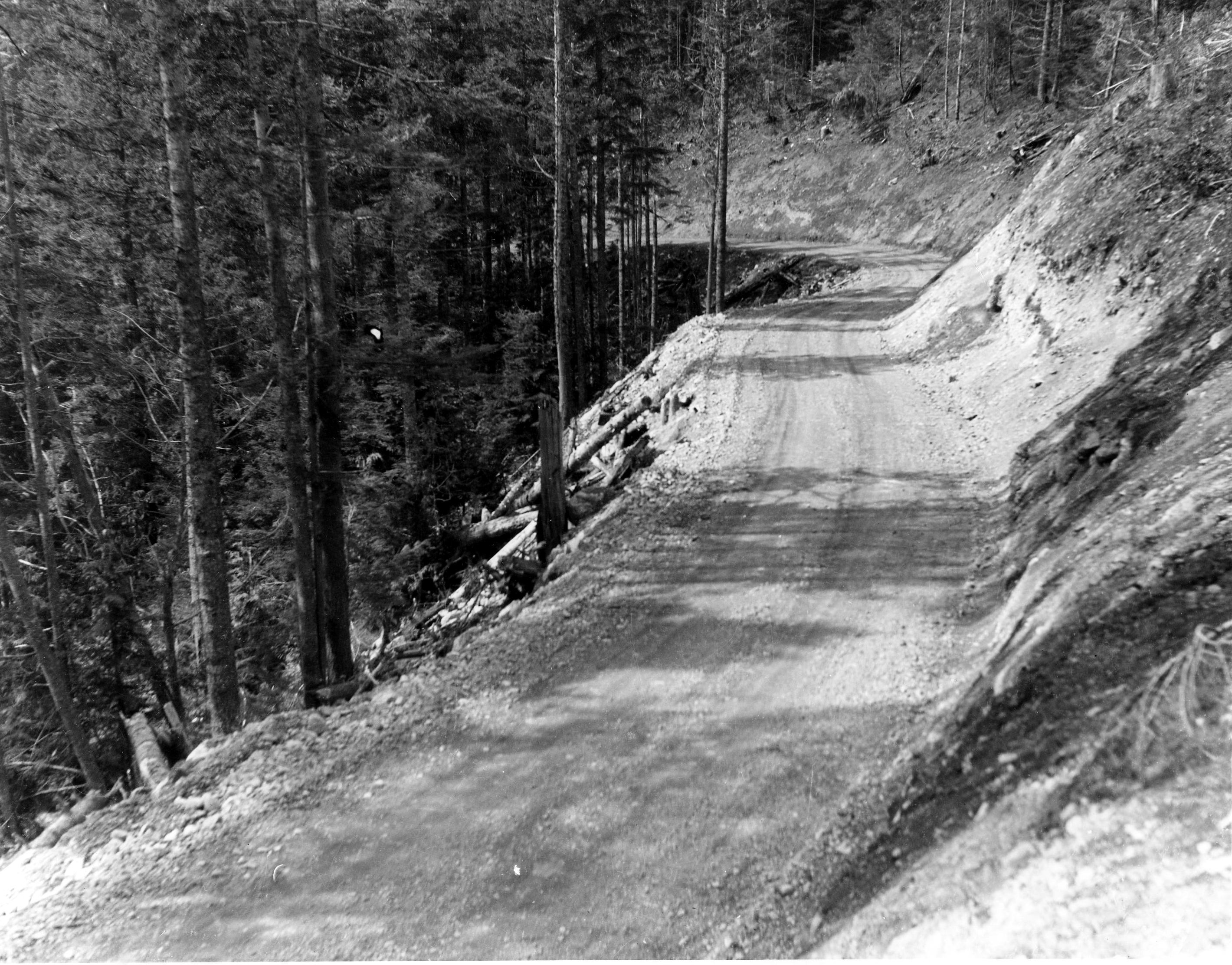
Finished road

Following World War II, in an effort to bolster the US economy, it was decided that the road system would be funded by the timber industry rather than the US Treasury. The building of these roads gave credit towards payments owed to the government for the timber, incentivizing logging companies to build roads. Some downsides to this approach are that National Grasslands were often ignored, and that logging companies often only made roads that suited their needs without environmental consideration.

The road system expanded to 200,000 miles (320,000 km) long by 1970 and 300,000 miles (480,000 km) by 1980. In 2004, the inventoried length of the system was 386,000 miles (621,000 km), with estimates placing the total count somewhere between 650,000 and 800,000 miles (1,050,000 and 1,290,000 km). Of this count, only about 86,000 miles (139,000 km) were intended for passenger cars.

From the 1990s on, new construction of Forest Service roads continuously went down, from 2,310 miles (3,720 km) built in 1988 to only 215 miles (346 km) in 1998. From 1991 to 1997, the Forest Service decommissioned an average of 2,700 miles (4,300 km) of road per year, marking a net decline in Forest Service roads.

=== 2001 Roadless Rule ===
On January 12, 2001, the USFS adopted the Roadless Area Conservation Rule to conserve about 45 million acres (180,000 km^{2}) of National Forests and Grasslands from road construction, reconstruction, or logging. In 2025, under the Trump administration, this rule was rescinded with the intent of increasing the ability to fight wildfires and returning jobs in logging to rural areas.

== See also ==
- Forest Highways, a subset of public Forest Service roads
