= Motor Vehicle Use Map =

Motor Vehicle Use Map is a legal tool for the USDA Forest Service to comply with and enforce the USDA's Travel Rule. While widely regarded as specific to off highway vehicles, it actually covers all public motorized use on all Forest Service roads and trails. The map itself is black and white, with little reference information, can be a variety of different dimensions, with different folding patterns, and is available in both hardcopy format at visitor centers and in digital (pdf) format on forest websites.

The Motor Vehicle Use Map is often referred to as MVUM.

The map is created by extracting spatial data from the agency's GIS depository (Enterprise Data Center, or EDC) which run's ESRI's SDE, and joining it with the tabular data that is stored in INFRA and extracted using I-Web.
