= The Other Slavery =

2016 book by Andrés Reséndez

The Other Slavery: The Uncovered Story of Indian Enslavement in America
- Book cover
- Author: Andrés Reséndez
- Language: English
- Subject: Native Americans, Slavery
- Genre: History, Nonfiction
- Publisher: Houghton Mifflin Harcourt
- Publication date: 2016
- Pages: 448 (first edition, hardback)
- ISBN: 978-0547640983
- Website: HarperCollins

The Other Slavery: The Uncovered Story of Indian Enslavement in America is a book about slavery among Native Americans and the European enslavement of Indigenous Americans. It was written by Andrés Reséndez and published by Houghton Mifflin Harcourt in 2016.

== About ==
The Other Slavery explores the history of Native American enslavement in the Americas. The book argues that Native American enslavement has been historically overlooked and marginalized.

Reséndez shows that slavery existed in the Americas prior to European colonozation. Indigenous peoples and later European colonizers enslaved Indigenous peoples. This practice continued for centuries after European arrival. The author documents the horrific treatment of Native American slaves, including forced labor, sexual exploitation, and physical violence and compares treatment of Native American slaves to the experiences of enslaved Africans.

== Synopsis ==
Andrés Reséndez argues that slavery was of the main factors that decimated the Indigenous population of North America. He calls the enslavement of Indigenous people "the other slavery", that predated and outlasted the African slave trade until the 20th century. The author claims that there is no historical record of disease spread in the Americas until 26 years after European arrival. He also notes that populations usually recover from epidemics within a few generations, as in the case of the Black Death, but the population of Indigenous Americans did not recover.

Reséndez writes that even after slavery was outlawed by the Spanish, and later by the governments of Mexico and the United States, those that benefitted from slavery used legal frameworks to avoid enforcement such as vagrancy laws, convict leasing, and debt peonage. In debt peonage, Indigenous peoples could be forced to work as long as they were paid, no matter how low the wages. Furthermore, Spain allowed the slavery of Indigenous peoples accused of cannibalism (often falsely), those captured in "just wars", and those captured by other Indigenous peoples.

Indigenous men performed forced labor in mines and plantations, and Indigenous women and children as domestic and sexual servants. Indigenous children were forced into apprenticeships, thus producing free labor. Mechanisms of economic exploitation and reduced freedom were used to produce forced labor as happened in repartimientos (poorly remunerated, forced labor), encomiendas (forced payments of tribute to European settlers), Spanish missions and haciendas (where peons "belonging" to a hacienda were part of the price of it).

The book says Christopher Columbus' "first business venture in the New World consisted of sending four caravels loaded to capacity with 550 Natives back to Europe, to be auctioned off in the markets of the Mediterranean." Hernán Cortés was the largest slave owner in Mexico. Mexican governors and US officials were slave owners or traders. He covers the case of territorial governor Luis Carvajal y de la Cueva. The Pueblo Revolt of 1680 was caused by Indigenous resistance to widespread slavery of Indigenous peoples from all over New Mexico for export to the large silver mines of Mexico. Even common citizens could arrest Indigenous peoples and once criminalized, were forced to work up to 20 years and sold in slave auctions. Not accepting the Christian religion or protecting territory was a crime for Indigenous peoples.

The author points out that the indications of slavery are the following: a) forced displacement, b) lack of freedom of movement or captivity, c) violence or threat of violence in case of non-compliance, d) non-payment or symbolic payment for work.

The book depicts slavery across four centuries and tells stories of slavery that affected 2.5 to 5 million Indigenous peoples. Reséndez uses as primary sources the written records made by European slavers and other observers.

== Recognition ==
The Other Slavery was a finalist for the National Book Award for Nonfiction in 2016. Reséndez won the 2017 Bancroft Prize in American History and Diplomacy for The Other Slavery.

== Reviews ==
Popular media

- Sanchez, C. (2016), ""The Other Slavery: The Uncovered Story of Indian Enslavement in America" by Andrés Reséndez", The Santa Fe New Mexican
- Treuer, D. (2016), "Review: The new book "The Other Slavery" will make you rethink American history", The Los Angeles Times
- Valentine, G. (2016), "Horrors Pile Up Quietly In "The Other Slavery"", NPR

Academic journals

- Fountain, S. M. (2017). "Reviewed work: The Other Slavery: The Uncovered Story of Indian Enslavement in America, by Andrés Reséndez". Oregon Historical Quarterly. 118 (4): 637. doi:10.5403/oregonhistq.118.4.0637.
- Maass, J. R. (2019). "Reviewed work: The Other Slavery: The Uncovered Story of Indian Enslavement in America, Andrés Reséndez". The North Carolina Historical Review. 96 (1): 110–111. JSTOR 45184996.
- O'Brien, G. (2017). "Reviewed work: The Other Slavery: The Uncovered Story of Indian Enslavement in America, Andrés Reséndez". The Journal of American History. 104 (1): 169–170. doi:10.1093/jahist/jax019. JSTOR 48548294.
- Payne, M. P. (2020). "Reviewed work: The Other Slavery: The Uncovered Story of Indian Enslavement in America, Andrés Reséndez". Anglican and Episcopal History. 89 (3): 354–355. JSTOR 26973719.
- Waite, K. (2017). "Reviewed work: The Other Slavery: The Uncovered Story of Indian Enslavement in America, Reséndez Andrés". Journal of the Civil War Era. 7 (3): 473–476. doi:10.1353/cwe.2017.0066. JSTOR 26381457. S2CID 164320613.

== Citation ==
- Reséndez, A. (2016). The Other Slavery: The Uncovered Story of Indian Enslavement in America (First ed.). Houghton Mifflin Harcourt. ISBN 978-0-547-64098-3.

== The author ==
Andrés Reséndez
- Occupations: Historian; professor
- Awards: Bancroft Prize (2017)

Academic background
- Education: El Colegio de México (B.A.); University of Chicago (Ph.D.)

Academic work
- Institutions: Yale University; University of Helsinki; University of California, Davis
- Main interests: Mexican history

Andrés Reséndez is a Mexican-born American historian at the University of California, Davis. His specialties are Mexican history, early exploration and colonization of the Americas and the Pacific Ocean, and borderlands history.

== Similar or related works ==
- Plantation Enterprise in Colonial South Carolina by S. Max Edelson
- Money, Trade, and Power: The Evolution of Colonial South Carolina's Plantation Society by Jack P. Greene
- Red, White, and Black Make Blue: Indigo in the Fabric of Colonial South Carolina Life by Andrea Feeser
- That Most Precious Merchandise: The Mediterranean Trade in Black Sea Slaves, 1260–1500 by Hannah Barker
- Christian Ritual and the Creation of British Slave Societies, 1650–1780 by Nicholas M. Beasley

== See also ==
- Slavery in the United States
- Slavery in colonial Spanish America
