= European enslavement of Indigenous Americans =

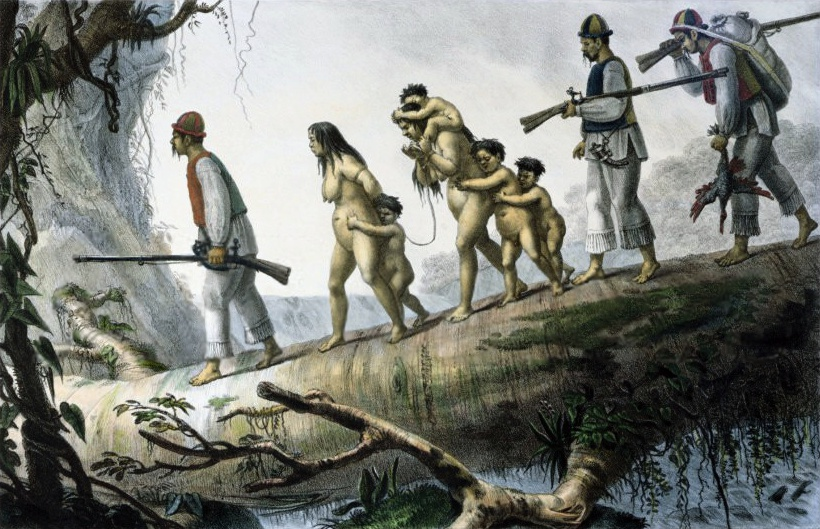
Painting by Jean-Baptiste Debret depicting bandeiras enslaving Guaraní people in the Brazilian interior

During and after the European colonization of the Americas, European settlers practiced widespread enslavement of Indigenous peoples. In the 15th century, the Spanish introduced chattel slavery through warfare and the cooption of existing systems. A number of other European powers followed suit, and from the 15th through the 19th centuries, between two and five million Indigenous people were enslaved, (Note: Rushforth estimates "between two and four million Indian slaves", while Reséndez estimates between 2.462 and 4.985 million Indigenous people were enslaved.) which had a devastating impact on many Indigenous societies, contributing to the overwhelming population decline of Indigenous peoples in the Americas.

After the decolonization of the Americas, the enslavement of Indigenous peoples continued into the 19th century in frontier regions of some countries, notably parts of Brazil, Peru Northern Mexico, and the Southwestern United States. Some Indigenous groups adopted European-style chattel slavery during the colonial period, most notably the "Five Civilized Tribes" in the United States, however far more Indigenous groups were involved in the selling of Indigenous slaves to Europeans.

== Colonial period ==
European enslavement of Indigenous Americans began with the Spanish colonization of the Caribbean. In Christopher Columbus's letter to Queen Isabella and King Ferdinand of Spain describing the Native Taíno, he remarks that "They ought to make good and skilled servants" and "these people are very simple in war-like matters... I could conquer the whole of them with 50 men, and govern them as I pleased". The Catholic Monarchs initially rejected Columbus' enthusiasm for the slave trade. But although they issued a decree in 1500 that specifically forbade the enslavement of Indigenous people, they allowed three exceptions which were freely abused by colonial Spanish authorities: slaves taken in "just wars"; those purchased from other Indigenous people; or those from groups alleged to practice cannibalism (such as the Kalinago). Prior to Spain's prohibition on enslaving Indigenous peoples of the Americas, Columbus brought Indigenous slaves back to Spain with him on his return journeys from the Caribbean.

As other European colonial powers joined the Spanish, the practice of Indigenous enslavement was expanded. The new international market for products like tobacco, sugar, and raw materials incentivized the creation of extraction- and plantation-based economies in eastern North America, such as English Carolina, Spanish Florida, and (Lower) French Louisiana. At first, slave labor for these colonies was obtained largely by trading with neighboring tribes, such as the Yamasee. This trade in slaves was new: prior to the arrival of Europeans, tribes in eastern North America did not view slaves as commodities that could be bought and sold freely. Anthropologist David Graeber argued that debt and the threat of violence made this sort of transformation of human beings into commodities possible. Tribes like the Yamasee raided for slaves in order to pay back the debt they owed to European traders for finished goods. This in turn created a demand for guns and ammunition, which further indebted the slave-raiding tribes and created a vicious cycle. Most (but not all) tribes in eastern North America had not considered the status of slave heritable, and often integrated the children of slaves into their own communities. The export of slaves to European colonies (and the high death rates there) created an unprecedented population drain. Slave-raiding also led to constant wars between tribes, and eventually destroyed or threatened to destroy most peoples in the vicinity of the colonies. (Note: "The English empire was also able to consume as much of the natives' commodities as the natives could produce, including the trade in enslaved Indigenous people. This trade infected the South: it set in motion a gruesome series of wars that engulfed the region. For close to five decades, virtually every group of people in the South lay threatened by destruction in these wars. Huge areas became depopulated, thousands of Indigenous people died, and thousands more Indigenous people were forcibly relocated to new areas in the South or exported from the region.") By the mid eighteenth century, population decline, frequent rebellions, and the availability of African slaves had caused a shift away from the large-scale enslavement of Indigenous peoples. Although it would be continued on the frontiers, in the economic cores of settler societies Indigenous slaves would be replaced with those of African origin.

=== Spanish colonies ===
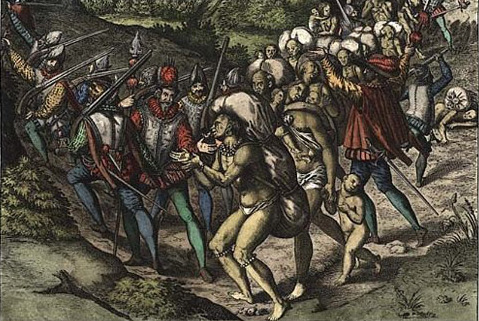
Engraving of Spaniards enslaving Indigenous Peruvians by Theodor de Bry

By 1499, Spanish settlers on Hispaniola had discovered gold in the Cordillera Central. This created a demand for large amounts of cheap labor, and an estimated 400,000 Taíno people from across the island were soon enslaved to work in gold mines. As discussed above, this practice of enslaving native peoples was immediately but ineffectually opposed by the Spanish Crown. Succeeding governors were appointed and recalled, often because of stories about their treatment of native populations. The Taíno people also resisted fiercely and were put down in a series of brutal massacres. Nonetheless, forced labor continued and was institutionalized as the encomienda system during the first decade of the 16th century. Under this system, private Spanish colonizers (encomenderos) were granted the right to the labor of groups of non-Christian Indigenous people. Although based on similar grants given during the Reconquista in Spain, in the Caribbean the system quickly became indistinguishable from the slavery it replaced. By 1508, the original Taíno population of 400,000 or more had been reduced to around 60,000. Spanish slave-raiding parties travelled across the Caribbean and "carried off entire populations" to work their colonies. Although disease is often pointed to as the cause of this population decline, the first recorded smallpox outbreak in the New World was not until 1518. Historian Andrés Reséndez at the University of California, Davis asserts that even though disease was a factor, the Indigenous population of Hispaniola would have rebounded the same way Europeans did following the Black Death if it were not for the constant enslavement they were subject to. He says that "among these human factors, slavery was the major killer" of Hispaniola's population, and that "between 1492 and 1550, a nexus of slavery, overwork and famine killed more natives in the Caribbean than smallpox, influenza or malaria." By 1521, the islands of the northern Caribbean were largely depopulated.

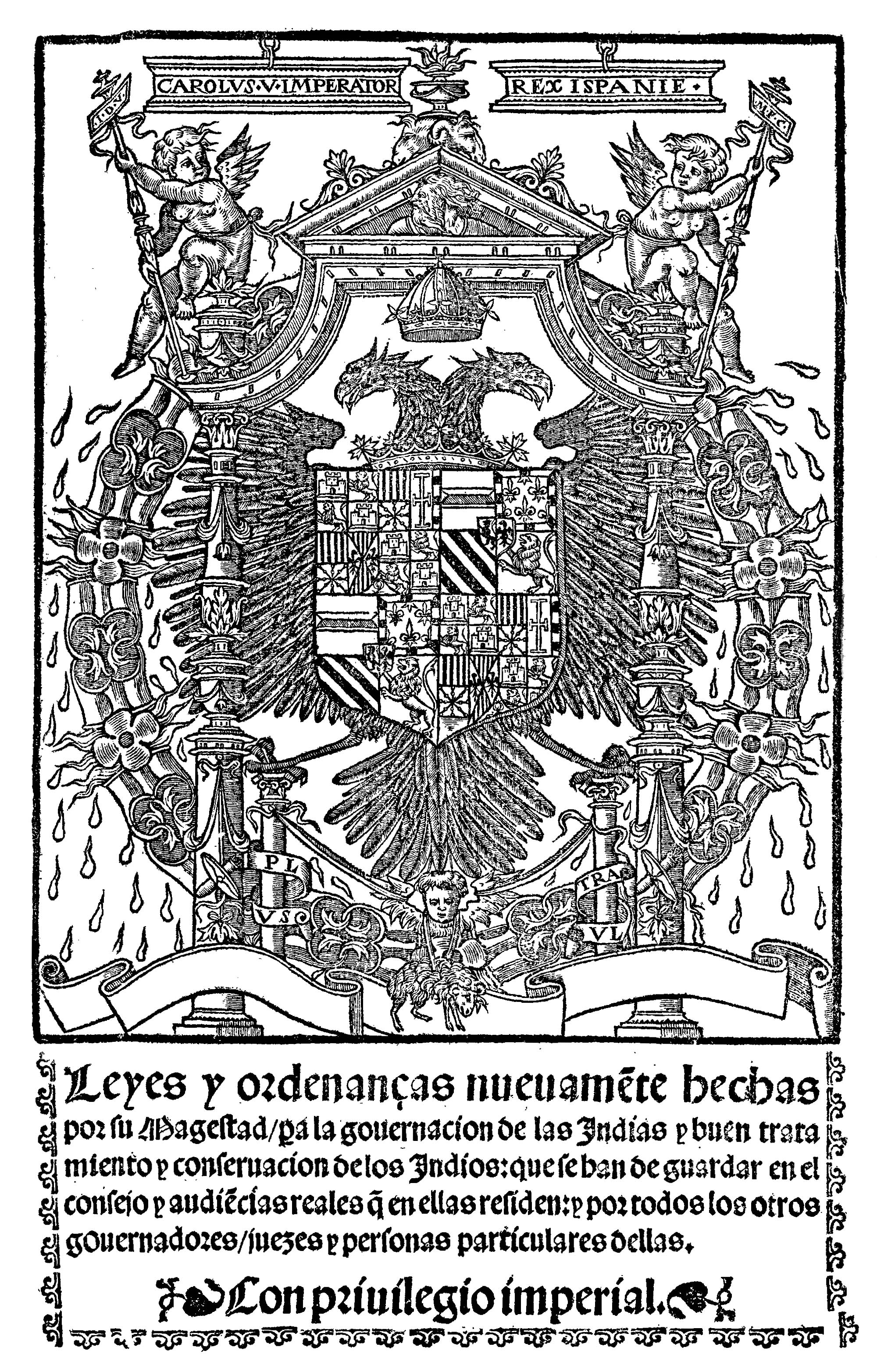
Cover of the New Laws of 1542

Members of the Spanish religious and legal professions were especially vocal in opposing the enslavement of native peoples. The first speech in the Americas for the universality of human rights and against the abuses of slavery was given on Hispaniola, a mere nineteen years after the first contact. Resistance to Indigenous captivity in the Spanish colonies produced the first modern debates over the legitimacy of slavery. Friar Bartolomé de Las Casas, author of A Short Account of the Destruction of the Indies, publicized the conditions of Indigenous Americans and lobbied Charles V to guarantee their rights. (Note: In 2007, Castro challenged the position of Bartolomé de las Casas as a central human-rights figure: "rather than viewing him as the ultimate champion of Indigenous causes, we must see the Dominican friar as the incarnation of a more benevolent, paternalistic form of ecclesiastical, political, cultural and economic imperialism rather than as a unique paradigmatic figure". See: Castro, The Other Face, Duke, 2007, p 8.) The Spanish progressively restricted and outright forbade the enslavement of Indigenous Americans in the early years of the Spanish Empire with the Laws of Burgos of 1512 and the New Laws of 1542. The latter replaced the encomienda with the repartimiento system, making the Indigenous people (in theory) free vassals of the Spanish Crown. Under repartimiento, Amerindians were paid wages for their work, but the work was still obligatory and still carried out under the supervision of a Spanish conquistador. Legally, these labor obligations were not allowed to interfere with the Amerindians' own survival, with only 7–10% of the adult male population allowed to be assigned to work at any time. The implementation of the New Laws and liberation of tens of thousands of Indigenous Americans led to a number of rebellions and conspiracies by encomenderos which were put down by the Spanish crown. Las Casas' writings gave rise to Spanish Black Legend, which Charles Gibson describes as "the accumulated tradition of propaganda and Hispanophobia according to which the Spanish Empire is regarded as cruel, bigoted, degenerate, exploitative and self-righteous in excess of reality". In later centuries, this would be used by other colonial powers to justify their own treatment of native populations as being at least superior to the Spanish alternative.

Despite being technically illegal, Indigenous slavery continued in Spanish America for centuries after the promulgation of the New Laws. Even in Spain itself, the use of Indigenous slaves did not end until the early 1600s. "Spanish masters resorted to slight changes in terminology, gray areas, and subtle reinterpretations to continue to hold Indians in bondage." Viceroys of New Spain justified enslaving large groups of natives by classifying wars of conquest (such as the Mixtón and Chichimeca Wars) as rebellions. Franciscan missions abused their grant of ten years' labor from surrounding peoples as grounds for perpetual servitude. Slavery was a major cause of the Pueblo Revolt of 1680 and other unrest among the Indigenous people of northern Mexico. Following the revolt, the business of providing enslaved people for the New Mexico market passed into the hands of the Navajo, Utes, Comanches, and Apaches. When the market for slaves began to dry up in the early 18th century, the surplus and ex-slaves settled in New Mexico, forming communities of so-called Genízaros. In 1672, Mariana of Austria freed the enslaved Indigenous people of Mexico. On 12 June 1679, Charles II issued a general declaration freeing all Indigenous slaves in Spanish America. In 1680 this was included in the Recopilación de las leyes de Indias, a codification of the laws of Spanish America. The Kalinago, "cannibals," were the only exception. The royal anti-slavery crusade did not end the enslavement of Indigenous people in Spain's American possessions, but, in addition to resulting in the freeing of thousands of enslaved people, it ended the involvement and facilitation by government officials of enslaving by the Spanish; purchase of slaves remained possible but only from Indigenous enslavers such as the Kalina or the Comanches.

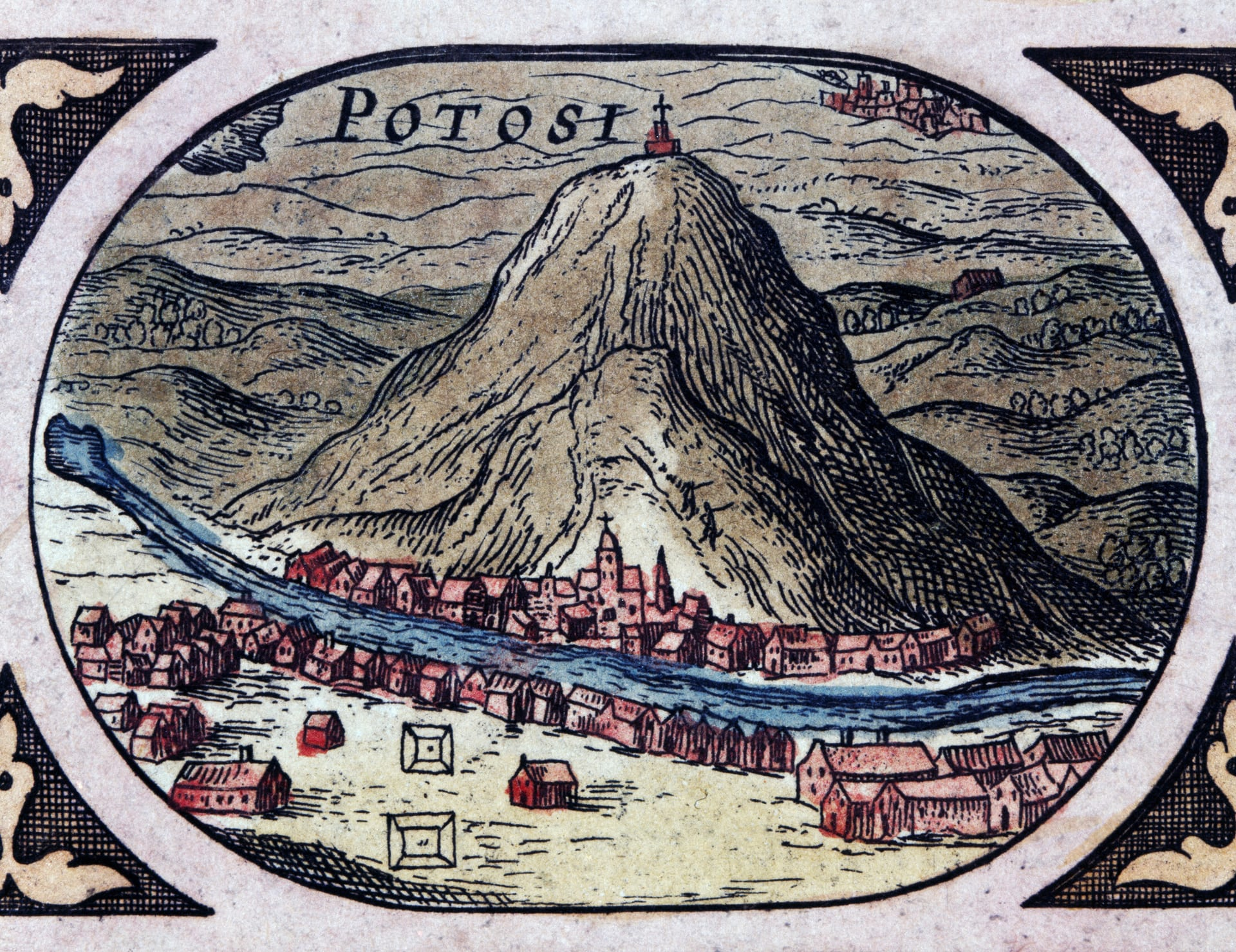
Cerro Rico in the town of Potosí was the most important source of silver in South America, and in all of Spanish America until Guanajuato in Mexico surpassed it in the 18th century.

In the Viceroyalty of Peru, the repartimiento system was particularly harsh. The colonial government repurposed the Inca mit'a system under their own administration. For over two centuries, thirteen thousand mitayos were forcefully conscripted every year to work in the silver mines of Potosí, Caylloma, and Huancavelica. Mitayos were forced to carry backbreaking loads in extreme conditions from the depths of the mine up to the surface. Falls, accidents, and illnesses (including mercury poisoning from the refinement process) were all commonplace. To avoid the repartimiento, thousands fled their traditional villages and forfeited their ayllu land rights. From the 16th to late 17th centuries, Upper Peru lost nearly 50% of its Indigenous population. This only increased the burden on the remaining natives, and by the 1600s, up to half of the eligible male population (as opposed to the repartimiento's original 7–10%) might find themselves working at Potosí in any given year. Laborers were paid, but the pay was dismal: just the cost of traveling to Potosí and back could be more than a mitayo was paid in a year, and so many of them chose to remain in Potosí as wage workers when their service was finished.

In Chile, Spanish occupation of the lands of the Mapuche was vigorously contested for 3 centuries in the Arauco War. In 1608, shortly after the war began, Philip III formally lifted the prohibition on Indigenous slavery for Mapuches caught in war, legalizing what had already become common practice. Legalization made Spanish slave raiding increasingly common, and Mapuche slaves were exported north to places such as La Serena and Lima in Peru. These raids were an underlying cause of the large Mapuche uprising of 1655. The uprising continued for an entire decade, and led Philip III's successor Philip IV to change course. Although he died without freeing the slaves outright, his successors would continue his policy towards abolition. Mariana of Austria, serving as regent, freed all the Indigenous slaves in Peru who had been captured in Chile. After receiving a plea from the Pope, she also freed the slaves of the southern Andes. On 12 June 1679, Charles II issued a general declaration freeing all Indigenous slaves in Spanish America. But despite these royal decrees, little changed in reality. There was strong resistance from local elites, such as Governor Juan Enríquez who simply refused to publish Charles II's decrees.

=== French colonies ===
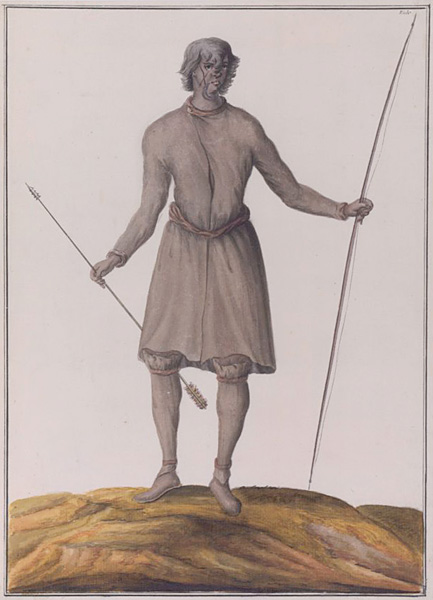
Illustration of a Meskwaki slave, circa 1732

Enslavement of Indigenous peoples was practiced in New France from the 17th century. It played a less important role than in Spanish or British colonies because the economy centered on the fur trade with Iroquoian- and Algonquian-speaking peoples. But the metal weapons these groups acquired from trade were used to devastating effect against the Pawnee and Meskwaki further to the west, and captured slaves were sometimes gifted or traded back to the French. The name Panismahas, a subtribe of the Pawnee, likely became corrupted into a generic term for any slaves of Indigenous origin in New France: Panis. Enslavement of panis was formalized through colonial law in 1709, with the passage of the Ordinance Rendered on the Subject of the Negroes and the Indians called Panis. Indigenous slaves could only be kept in bondage while they stayed within the colony, but in practice enslaved individuals remained enslaved regardless of where they travelled. In 1747, the colonial administration proposed permitting the trade of First Nations slaves for slaves of African descent. However, these attempts were quashed by the French government, who feared it would jeopardize their strong relations with native tribes. In Lower Louisiana and especially the French West Indies, planters generally preferred using African slaves, though in Louisiana some held panis as household servants. Thus Louis Antoine de Bougainville concluded in 1757 that the Panis played "the same role in America that the Negroes do in Europe."

The importation of panis began to decline in the decade prior to the 1760 Conquest of New France. While the Articles of Capitulation of Montreal allowed the enslavement of First Nations people to continue, by the late 18th century it had largely been eclipsed by the Atlantic slave trade. Historian Marcel Trudel has discovered 4,092 recorded enslaved people throughout Canadian history, of which 2,692 were Indigenous, enslaved mostly by French colonists, and 1,400 Black people enslaved mostly by British colonists; collectively, the 4,092 slaves were enslaved by roughly 1,800 enslavers. Trudel also noted 31 marriages took place between French colonists and aboriginal slaves.

=== British colonies ===
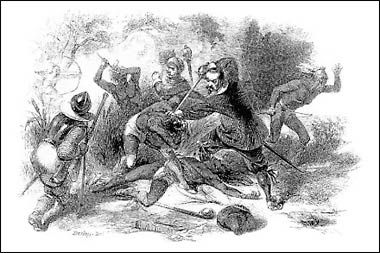
The Pequot War resulted in the enslavement of some of the surviving Pequot by English colonists in New England.

During the 17th and 18th centuries, English colonists in New England frequently exported Native slaves to other mainland possessions as well as the "sugar islands" of the Caribbean. The source of slaves was mainly prisoners of war, including women and children. (Note: While Philip and the vast majority of hostile Natives were killed outright during the war or sold into slavery in the West Indies, the friendly Wampanoag at Manomet Ponds retained their lands.) The 1677 work The Doings and Sufferings of the Christian Indians documents how imprisoned Praying Indians, who were allied to the colonists, were also enslaved and sent to Caribbean destinations. (Note: But this shows the prudence and fidelity of the Christian Indians; yet notwithstanding all this service they were, with others of our Christian Indians, through the harsh dealings of some English, in a manner constrained, for want of shelter, protection, and encouragement, to fall off to the enemy at Hassanamesit, the story whereof follows in its place; and one of them, viz. Sampson, was slain in fight, by some scouts of our praying Indians, about Watchuset; and the other, Joseph, taken prisoner in Plymouth Colony, and sold for a slave to some merchants at Boston, and sent to Jamaica, but upon the importunity of Mr. Elliot, which the master of the vessel related to him, was brought back again, but not released. His two children taken prisoners with him were redeemed by Mr. Elliot, and afterward his wife, their mother, taken captive, which woman was a sober Christian woman and is employed to teach school among the Indians at Concord, and her children are with her, but her husband held as before, a servant; though several that know the said Joseph and his former carriage, have interceded for his release, but cannot obtain it; some informing authority that he had been active against the English when he was with the enemy.) (Note: Sampson was killed by a group of English colonists near Wachuset, and Joseph was captured and sold into slavery in the West Indies.)

The enslavement and trafficking of Indigenous American people was also practiced in the Province of Carolina, where historian Alan Gallay notes that during this period more slaves were exported from than imported to the major port of Charles Town. What set Carolina apart from the other English colonies on the Atlantic coast of North America was a substantial population of potential slaves in its hinterlands. The superiority of English trade goods over that of the competing French and Spanish also played an important role in centralizing trade in Carolina. Sometimes the colonists captured the slaves themselves, but more often bought them from native tribes who came to specialize in slave raids. One of the first of these was the Westo, followed by many others including the Yamasee, Chickasaw, and Muscogee. Traded goods, such as axes, bronze kettles, Caribbean rum, European jewelry, needles, and scissors, varied among the tribes, but the most prized were rifles. The depletion of Indigenous populations coupled with revolts (such as the Yamasee War) would eventually lead to Native Americans being replaced with African slaves in the colonial southeast.

The exact number of Native Americans who were enslaved is unknown because vital statistics and census reports were at best infrequent. Historian Alan Gallay estimates that from 1670 to 1715, English slave traders in Carolina sold between 24,000 and 51,000 Native Americans from what is now the southern part of the U.S. Andrés Reséndez estimates that between 147,000 and 340,000 Native Americans were enslaved in North America, excluding Mexico. Even after the Indian Slave Trade ended in 1750 the enslavement of Native Americans continued in the west, and also in the Southern states mostly through kidnappings.

=== Portuguese slave trade ===
==== Portuguese Brazil ====
In Brazil, colonists were heavily dependent on Indigenous labor during the initial phases of settlement to maintain the subsistence economy, and natives were often captured by expeditions called bandeiras ("Flags", from the flag of Portugal they carried in a symbolic claiming of new lands for the country). Bandeirantes frequently targeted Jesuit reductions, capturing thousands of natives from them in the early 1600s. In 1629, Antônio Raposo Tavares led a bandeira, composed of 2,000 allied índios, "Indians", 900 mamelucos, "mestizos" and 69 whites, to find precious metals and stones and to capture Indians for slavery. This expedition alone was responsible for the enslavement of over 60,000 Indigenous people. Conflict between settlers who wanted to enslave Indians and Jesuits who sought to protect them was common throughout the era, particularly as disease reduced the Indian populations. In 1661, for example, Padre António Vieira's attempts to protect native populations lead to an uprising and the temporary expulsion of the Jesuits in Maranhão and Pará. The importation of African slaves began midway through the 16th century, but the enslavement of Indigenous peoples continued well into the 19th century. While travelling along the Japura River in 1827, English lieutenant Henry Lister Maw noted that slave raids for men, women and children in the Putumayo and Japurá region had been going on for over one hundred years. At that time these slave raids were being carried out by Portuguese and Brazilians.

==== North Atlantic ====
In 1500-1501, the Portuguese slave trader Gaspar Corte-Real kidnapped 50 Inuit from Greenland, two shiploads of Haudenosaunee people from Newfoundland and New England, and other Indigenous peoples from the northeast Atlantic coastline. The Inuit, Haudenosaunee, and other Indigenous slaves were brought to Lisbon, Portugal.

== Postcolonial period ==
=== United States ===
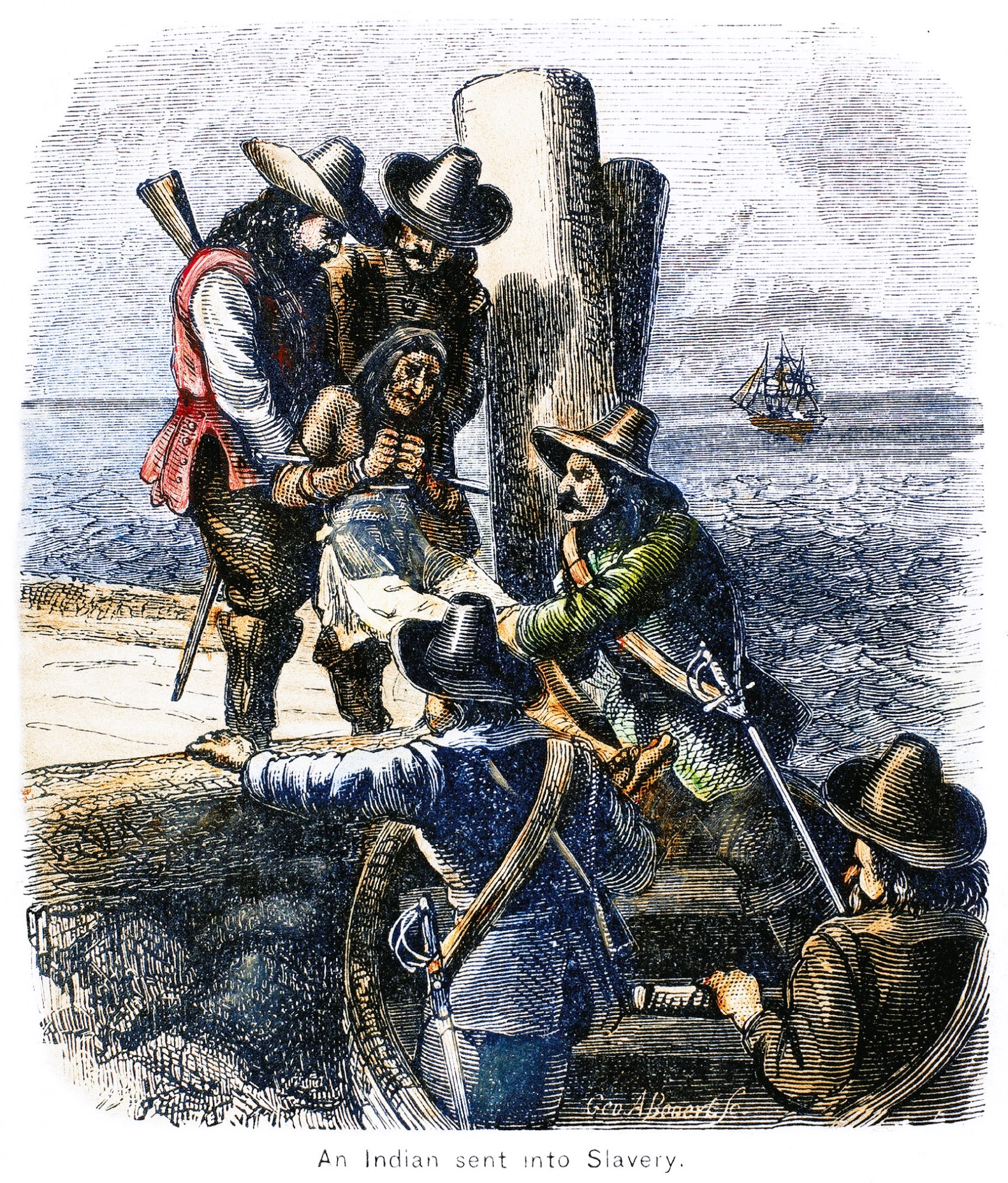
Native American being enslaved by Virginia colonists in the 17th century

After the mid-1700s, it becomes more difficult to track the history of Native American enslavement in the British colonies. Indian slavery had declined on a large scale, and as a result, those Native Americans who were still enslaved were either not recorded or they were not differentiated from African slaves. For example, in Rhode Island Sarah Chauqum was listed as mulatto, but she won her freedom by proving her Narragansett identity. That said, records and slave narratives archived by the Works Progress Administration (WPA) clearly indicate that the enslavement of Native Americans continued in the 1800s, mostly through kidnappings. One example is a WPA interview with a former slave, Dennis Grant, whose mother was full-blooded Native American. She was kidnapped as a child near Beaumont, Texas in the 1850s, made a slave, and later forced to become the wife of another enslaved person.

==== Southwestern states ====
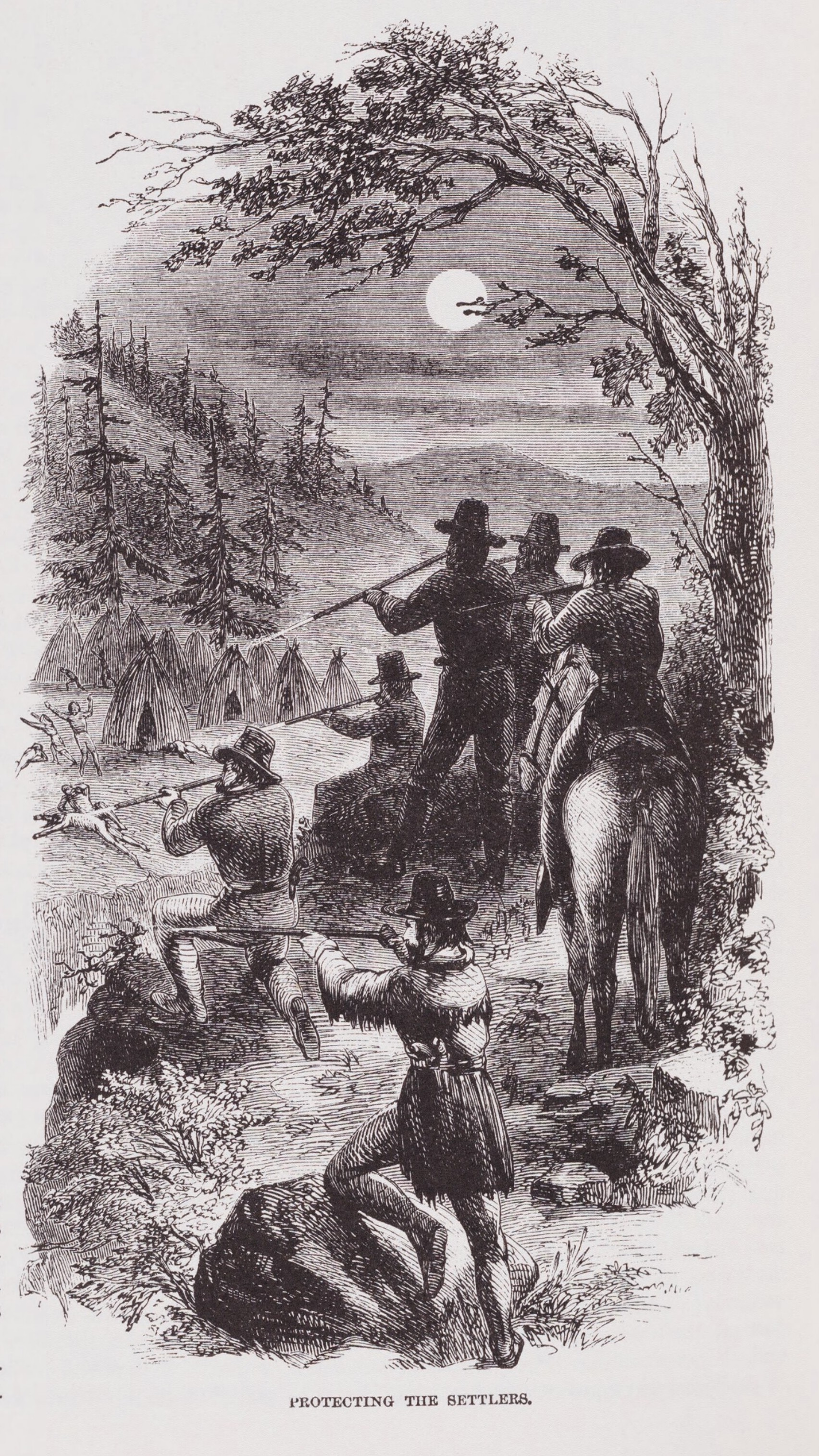
Many Native Americans were enslaved by American settlers during the California Genocide.

The Mexican–American War brought large swathes of territory into the United States where Native American slavery was practiced at scale, and the states and territories created to govern these lands often legalized or expanded the practice. The Indian Act of 1850 sanctioned the enslavement of Native Americans in California under the guise of stopping vagrancy. The act "facilitated removing California Indians from their traditional lands, separating at least a generation of children and adults from their families, languages, and cultures ... and indenturing Indian children and adults to Whites." Due to the nature of California court records, it is difficult to estimate of the number of Native Americans enslaved as a result of the legislation. Benjamin Madley places the number at somewhere between 24,000 and 27,000, including 4,000 to 7,000 children. During the period the legislation was in effect, the Native Californian population of Los Angeles decreased from 3,693 to 219 people. Although the California legislature repealed parts of the statute after the 13th Amendment to the United States Constitution abolished involuntary servitude in 1865, it was not repealed in its entirety until 1937.

Both debt peonage and Navajo slaveholding were well established in New Mexico when it became a territory. Native American slaves were in the households of many prominent New Mexicans, including the governor and Kit Carson. Black slaves, in contrast, were vanishingly rare. The Compromise of 1850 allowed New Mexico to choose its own stance on slavery, and in 1859, it was formally legalized. This move was not without opposition: soon after the treaty had been signed, a group of prominent New Mexicans petitioned Congress to prevent slavery from being made legal. They were likely motivated by their desire for self-government and a fear of invasion by the slave state of Texas. On June 19, 1862, Congress prohibited slavery in all US territories. Prominent New Mexicans petitioned the Senate for compensation for the 600 Indian slaves that were going to be set free. The Senate denied their request and sent federal agents to abolish slavery. But the years from 1864 to 1866 saw an expansion rather than a decline of Native American enslavement in New Mexico. This was a consequence of the Long Walk of the Navajo, during which the federal government organized some 53 separate death marches of Navajo from their land in what is now Arizona to eastern New Mexico. Taking advantage of their vulnerable position, Mexican and Ute enslavers captured many Navajo and sold them as slaves in places as far away as Conejos County, Colorado. Thus, when Special Indian Agent J. K. Graves visited in June 1866, he found that slavery was still widespread, and many of the federal agents had slaves. In his report, he estimated that there were 400 slaves in Santa Fe alone. On March 2, 1867, Congress passed the Peonage Act of 1867, which specifically targeted New Mexican slavery. After this act, the number of slaves taken dropped sharply in the 1870s.

==== Utah ====
Shortly after the Mormon pioneers settled Salt Lake City on the lands of the Western Shoshone, Weber Ute, and Southern Paiute, conflict with nearby Native American groups began. At the Battle at Fort Utah, Brigham Young led the enslavement of many Timpanogo women and children. In the winter of 1849–1850, after expanding into Parowan, Mormons attacked a group of Indians, killing around 25 men and taking the women and children as slaves. News of the enslavement reached the US Government, who appointed Edward Cooper as Indian Agent to combat enslavement in September 1850. But at the encouragement of Mormon leaders, the Mormon participation in the Indian slave trade continued to expand. In 1851, Apostle George A. Smith gave Chief Peteetneet and Walkara talking papers that certified "it is my desire that they should be treated as friends, and as they wish to Trade horses, Buckskins and Piede children, we hope them success and prosperity and good bargains." In May 1851 Brigham Young met with settlers in the Parawon region and encouraged them to "buy up the Lamanite children as fast as they could".

However, the Mormons strongly opposed the New Mexican slave trade, which caused sometimes dramatic conflicts with the slave traders. When Don Pedro León Luján was caught violating the Nonintercourse Act in November 1851 by attempting to trade slaves with the Indians without a valid license, he and his party were prosecuted. His property was seized and the child slaves were sold to Mormon families in Manti. In another incident, Ute Chief Arrapine demanded that the Mormons purchase a group of children that they had prevented him from selling to the Mexicans. When they refused, he executed the captives.

In March 1852, the Utah Territory formally legalized Indian slavery with the Act for the relief of Indian Slaves and Prisoners. Mormons continued taking children from their families long after the slave traders left and even began to actively solicit children from parents. They also began selling Indian slaves to each other. By 1853, each of the hundred households in Parowan had one or more Southern Paiute children kept as slaves. Indian slaves were used for both domestic and manual labor. The practice of Indian enslavement concerned the Republican Party, who had made anti-slavery one of the pillars of their platform. While considering appropriations for the Utah Territory, Representative Justin Smith Morrill criticized its laws on Indian slavery. He said that the laws were unconcerned about the way the Indian slaves were captured, noting that the only requirement was that the Indian be possessed by a white person through purchase or otherwise. He said that Utah was the only American government to enslave Indians, and said that state-sanctioned slavery "is a dreg placed at the bottom of the cup by Utah alone". He estimated that in 1857 there were 400 Indian slaves in Utah, but historian Richard Kitchen estimates far more went unrecorded because of their high mortality rate: over half died by their early 20s. Those who survived and were released generally found themselves without a community, full members of neither their original tribes nor the white communities in which they were raised. The Republicans' abhorrence of slavery in Utah delayed Utah's entrance as a state into the Union.

=== Mexico ===
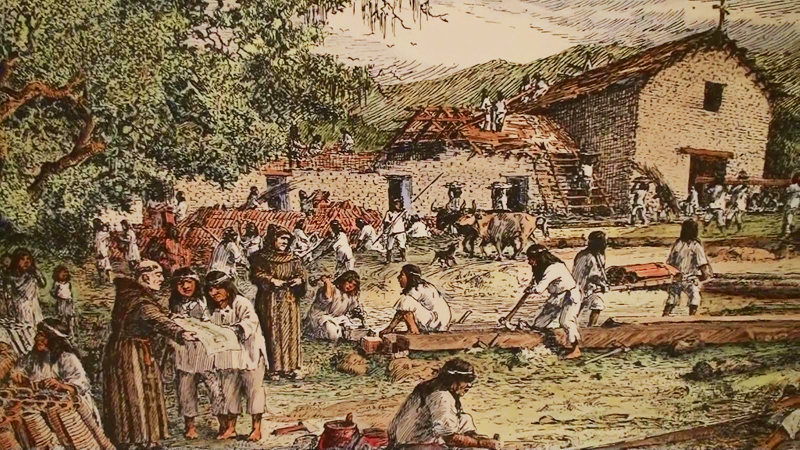
The Spanish missions in Mexican California continued to use forced Indian labor even after Mexican independence, the so-called "Mission Indians".

After Mexico gained independence from Spain in 1821, Mexico enacted the Treaty of Córdoba, which decreed that Indigenous tribes within its borders were citizens of Mexico. Officially, the newly independent Mexican government proclaimed a policy of social equality for all ethnic groups, and the genízaros were officially considered equals to their vecino (villagers of mainly mixed racial background) and Pueblo neighbors. Vicente Guerrero abolished slavery in 1829. But this never was completely put into practice. The Mexican slave trade continued to flourish, because the Mexican War of Independence had disrupted the defenses at the border. For decades the region was subject to raids by Apaches, Kiowas, and large Comanche war parties who looted, killed and took slaves. The average price for a boy slave was $100, while girls brought $150 to $200. Girls demanded a higher price because they were thought to be excellent house keepers and they were frequently used as sex slaves. Bent's Fort, a trading post on the Santa Fe Trail, was one customer of the enslavers, as were Comancheros, Hispanic traders based in New Mexico. Some border communities in Mexico itself were also in the market for slaves. But in general, Mexican landowners and magnates turned to debt peonage, advancing money to workers on terms that were impossible to meet. Laws were passed requiring servants to complete the terms of any contract for service, essentially reinstating slavery in a new form.

The Mexican secularization act of 1833 "freed" the Indigenous people attached to the missions of California, providing for distribution of land to mission Indigenous people and sale of remaining grazing land. But through grants and auctions, the bulk of the land was transferred to wealthy Californios and other investors. Any Indigenous people who had received land soon fell into debt peonage and became attached to the new Ranchos. The workforce was supplemented with Indigenous people who had been captured.

== Indigenous involvement in slavery ==
Indigenous peoples participated in the colonial era slave trade in several ways. During the period of widespread enslavement of Indigenous peoples, tribes such as the Westo, Yamasee, Shawnee and others actively enslaved members of other tribes for sale to European settlers. As discussed above, this trade was especially prominent around the Province of Carolina in the 17th and early 18th centuries. In what would become the southwestern United States, the Comanche, Chiricahua, and Ute peoples played a similar role capturing and selling slaves, first to Mexican and then American settlers. In Brazil, many bandeirantes (who captured and enslaved many Indigenous peoples) were of Indigenous or Mameluco origins themselves.

Some Indigenous groups also adopted the European practice of African chattel slavery. All Five Civilized Tribes—the Cherokee, Muscogee, Seminole, Chickasaw, and Choctaw nations—adopted slavery. During the Trail of Tears, they took with them several thousand African slaves. The fact that the Cherokee nation held African slaves played a role in their decision to side with the Confederacy in the American Civil War. In 2017, a dispute erupted over whether the descendants of the Cherokee freedmen should be considered citizens of the Cherokee Nation.

== See also ==
- Atlantic Slave Trade
- Blackbirding
- European colonization of the Americas
- Genocide of Indigenous peoples
- History of colonialism
- Indian indenture system
- Mississippian shatter zone
- The Other Slavery: The Uncovered Story of Indian Enslavement in America

== Bibliography ==
- Perdue, Theda (1979). Slavery and the Evolution of Cherokee Society, 1540–1866. University of Tennessee Press. ISBN 978-0870495304.
- Ginzburg, Carlo (2012). "Chapter 3: Montaigne, Cannibals, and Grottoes". Threads and Traces: True False Fictive. University of California Press. ISBN 978-0520274488.
- Canseco, María Rostworowski de Díez (1999). History of the Inca realm. Cambridge New York Melbourne: Cambridge Univ. Pr. p. 63. ISBN 978-0521637596.
- López Hernández, Miriam (2012). Aztec women and goddesses (1st English ed.). México City: FCAS – Fundación Cultural Armella Spitalier. ISBN 978-6078187164. OCLC 794489192.
- Foias, Antonia E. (2014). Ancient Maya Political Dynamics. Gainesville, Florida: University of Florida Press. ISBN 978-0813060897.
- Gookin, Daniel (1836) [1677]. The Doings and Sufferings of the Christian Indians . hdl:2027/mdp.39015005075109. OCLC 3976964. archaeologiaame02amer.
- Barros Arana, Diego (2000). Historia general de Chile (in Spanish). Vol. Tomo cuarto (Second ed.). Alicante: Biblioteca Virtual Miguel de Cervantes.
- Bodge, George Madison (1906). "Appendix A". Soldiers in King Philip's War. Boston: The Rockwell and Churchill Press. p. 479.
- Burkholder, Mark; Johnson, Lyman (2019). Colonial Latin America (Tenth ed.). New York: Oxford University Press. ISBN 978-0190642402. OCLC 1015274908.
- Floyd, Troy (1973). The Columbus Dynasty in the Caribbean, 1492–1526. Albuquerque: University of New Mexico Press.
- Foerster, Rolf (1993). Introducción a la religiosidad mapuche (in Spanish). Editorial universitaria.
- Gallay, Alan (2002). The Indian Slave Trade: The Rise of the English Empire in the American South, 1670–1717 (Kindle ed.). New York: Yale University Press. ISBN 0300101937.
- Gallay, Alan (2009). "Introduction: Indian Slavery in Historical Context". Indian Slavery in Colonial America. Lincoln, NE: University of Nebraska Press.
- Hyde, George E. (1988). The Pawnee Indians. University of Oklahoma Press. ISBN 978-0806120942.
- Lauber, Almon (1913). Indian Slavery in Colonial Times Within the Present Limits of the United States. Vol. 53. Columbia University.
- Molina, J. Ignatius (1809). The Geographical, Natural and Civil History of Chili.
- Reséndez, Andrés (2016). The Other Slavery: The Uncovered Story of Indian Enslavement in America. Boston: Houghton Mifflin Harcourt. ISBN 978-0544947108.
- Rushforth, Brett (2014). Bonds of Alliance: Indigenous and Atlantic Slaveries in New France. Chapel Hill: University of North Carolina Press. ISBN 978-1469613864.
- Valenzuela Márquez, Jaime (2009). "Esclavos mapuches. Para una historia del secuestro y deportación de indígenas en la colonia". In Gaune, Rafael; Lara, Martín (eds.). Historias de racismo y discriminación en Chile (in Spanish). Santiago, Chile: Uqbar Editores.
- Knack, Martha C. (2004). Boundaries Between: Southern Paiutes, 1775–1995. University of Nebraska Press. ISBN 978-0803278189.
- Holt, Ronald L. (2006). Beneath These Red Cliffs: An Ethnohistory of the Utah Paiutes. Logan, Utah: Utah State University Press. ISBN 0874216370.
- Blackhawk, Ned (2009). Violence over the Land: Indians and Empires in the Early American West. Harvard University Press. ISBN 978-0674020993.
- Farmer, Jared (2008). On Zion's Mount: Mormons, Indians, and the American Landscape. Harvard University Press. ISBN 978-0674027671.
- Brooks, James (2002). Captives and Cousins, Slavery, Kinship, and Community in the Southwest Borderlands. Chapell Hill, North Carolina: University of North Carolina Press. ISBN 0807853828.
- Dunlay, Tom (2000). Kit Carson & the Indians. Lincoln, Nebraska: University of Nebraska Press. ISBN 0803217153.
- Forbes, Jack D. (1960). Apache, Navajo and Spaniard. Norman, Oklahoma: University of Oklahoma Press.
- Snodgrass, Mary Ellen (2011). The Civil War Era and Reconstruction: An Encyclopedia of Social, Political, Cultural and Economic History. New York: Routledge. ISBN 978-0765682574.
- Hunt, Aurora (2000). Kirby Benedict, Frontier Federal Judge (Paperback ed.). Beard Books. ISBN 1893122808.
- Yarbrough, Fay A. (2008). "Indian Slavery and Memory: Interracial sex from the slaves' perspective". Race and the Cherokee Nation. University of Pennsylvania Press.
- Roberts, Calvin A.; Roberts, Susan A. (2006). New Mexico (Rev. ed.). Albuquerque: Univ. of New Mexico Press. ISBN 978-0826340030.
- Gonzalez-Berry, [ed. by] Erlinda (2000). The contested homeland: a Chicano history of New Mexico (1st ed.). Albuquerque: University of New Mexico Press. ISBN 0826321984.
- Miller, Randall M.; Smith, John David (1975). Dictionary of Afro-American Slavery. Greenwood. ISBN 0313238146.
- Wasniewski, M.A.; Kowalewski, A.; O'Hara, L.T.; Rucker, T. (2014). Hispanic Americans in Congress, 1822–2012. House document. U.S. Government Printing Office. pp. 49–52. ISBN 978-0160920288.
- Newell (2009). "Indian Slavery in Colonial New England". In Gallay, Alan (ed.). Indian Slavery in Colonial America. Lincoln: University of Nebraska Press. ISBN 978-0803222007.
- Maybury-Lewis, David (2002). "Genocide against Indigenous peoples". Annihilating Difference: The Anthropology of Genocide. University of California Press. ISBN 978-0520230293.
- Rael-Galvéz, Estévan (2002). Identifying and Capturing Identity: Narratives of American Indian Servitude, Colorado and New Mexico, 1750–1930 (PhD thesis). University of Michigan.
- Casement, Roger (1997). The Amazon Journal of Roger Casement. Anaconda Editions. ISBN 1901990052.
