= Red, White, and Black Make Blue =

Book about slavery and the indigo trade in South Carolina

Red, White, and Black Make Blue: Indigo in the Fabric of Colonial South Carolina Life
- Author: Andrea Feeser
- Language: English
- Subject: British American colonial history
- Genre: History, non-fiction
- Publisher: University of Georgia Press
- Publication date: 2013
- Pages: 160
- ISBN: 978-0820345536
- Website: Book page at UG Press

Red, White, and Black Make Blue: Indigo in the Fabric of Colonial South Carolina Life is a book written by Andrea Feeser and published by the University of Georgia Press in 2013.

== About ==
When blue became the most popular color for textiles produced in Britain during the eighteenth century, South Carolina indigo dye, used to color most of this cloth, became a critical component in transatlantic commodity chains. In the book Red, White, and Black Make Blue, Andrea Feeser recounts the stories of individuals who contributed to making indigo an integral part of the colonial South Carolina experience, exploring the plant's relationships to land use, slave labor, textile production, use, expression, and wealth creation.

Indigo played an important role in colonial South Carolina's economic development. The widespread popularity of blue among the upper and lower classes resulted in high demand for indigo, and the region's climate was favorable for its cultivation. The availability of enslaved labor made it economically feasible to commoditize indigo. Additionally, the colonists' access to land taken from displaced or enslaved indigenous peoples significantly increased the land available for cultivation.

== Structure ==
Feeser's book is organized thematically rather than chronologically. It begins by analyzing a London dyer's shop sign to explore the connections between conquest and trade that shaped British industrialization. In the second chapter, she examines a 1776 illustration by William Blake of Surinam women wearing matching skirts printed in a red and blue design. The chapter concludes by comparing blue designs in the clothing of an escaped enslaved person from Angola and a Cherokee shoulder strap, which Feeser sees as evidence of the wearers' agency in creating linkages to their past and present. Chapter three explores the various meanings of indigo, from nationalistic pride to income for planters and security for loyalists. In chapters four and five, Feeser recounts how Native American land was acquired for indigo cultivation and how enslaved Africans possessed knowledge of indigo.

The final two chapters include case studies of individuals who expressed agency in their relationship with indigo, including a free mixed-race man who deserted an indigo plantation and an enslaved African carpenter who built wooden indigo vats. The book concludes with examining a photograph of a patchwork woolen apron, which symbolizes Feeser's search for meaning in an eighteenth-century silk dress that sparked her interest in South Carolina's colonial past.

== Publication information ==
- Feeser, A. (2013). Red, White, and Black Make Blue: Indigo in the Fabric of Colonial South Carolina Life (Illustrated ed.). University of Georgia Press. ISBN 978-0-8203-3817-0.

== Author ==
Andrea Feeser is professor of modern and contemporary art history, theory, and criticism, Department of Art at Clemson University.

== Similar or related works ==
- The Other Slavery: The Uncovered Story of Indian Enslavement in America by Andrés Reséndez
- Plantation Enterprise in Colonial South Carolina by S. Max Edelson
- Money, Trade, and Power: The Evolution of Colonial South Carolina's Plantation Society by Jack P. Greene
- That Most Precious Merchandise: The Mediterranean Trade in Black Sea Slaves, 1260–1500
- Christian Ritual and the Creation of British Slave Societies, 1650–1780

== See also ==
- Colonial history of the United States
- Province of South Carolina
- Otranto Plantation Indigo Vats
