= Barker Dam =

Barker Dam may refer to:

- Barker Dam (California), listed on the U.S. National Register of Historic Places
- Barker Dam at Barker Meadow Reservoir, Colorado
