= Plantation Enterprise in Colonial South Carolina =

Book about slavery during colonial South Carolina

- Book cover
- Author: S. Max Edelson
- Language: English
- Subject: South Carolina, Slavery
- Genre: Non-fiction, academic, History
- Publisher: Harvard University Press
- Publication date: 2006
- Pages: 400 (original hardback)
- ISBN: 978-0-674-02303-1
- Website: Harvard University Press

Plantation Enterprise in Colonial South Carolina is a book written by S. Max Edelson and published by Harvard University Press in 2006. The work is about plantations, slavery, and economics in colonial South Carolina.

== Structure ==
Work begins with an introduction by the author and is followed by six chapters and a conclusion plus appendices and indexes.

- Introduction
1. Laying Claim to the Land
2. Rice Culture Origins
3. Transforming the Plantation Landscape
4. City, Hinterland, and Frontier
5. Marketplace of Identity
6. Henry Laurens's Empire
- Conclusion: Into the American South

== Academic journal reviews ==
- Anzilotti, Cara (2007). "Reviewed work: Plantation Enterprise in Colonial South Carolina, S. Max Edelson". The William and Mary Quarterly. 64 (4): 866–868. JSTOR 25096758.
- Casady, Brian (2007). "Reviewed work: Plantation Enterprise in Colonial South Carolina, S. Max Edelson". The International Journal of African Historical Studies. 40 (2): 343–345. JSTOR 40033936.
- Downey, Tom (2007). "Reviewed work: Plantation Enterprise in Colonial South Carolina, S. Max Edelson". Enterprise & Society. 8 (4): 977–979. doi:10.1093/es/khm089. JSTOR 23700794.
- Ellis, Clifton (2008). "Book Reviews: S. Max Edelson. Plantation Enterprise in Colonial South Carolina. Cambridge, MA: Harvard University Press, 2006". Winterthur Portfolio. 42: 93–95. doi:10.1086/528915. S2CID 163699094.
- Gallay, Alan (2007). "Reviewed work: Plantation Enterprise in Colonial South Carolina, S. Max Edelson". The Journal of American History. 94 (2): 537. doi:10.2307/25094973. JSTOR 25094973.
- Glover, Lorri (2007). "Reviewed work: Plantation Enterprise in Colonial South Carolina, S. Max Edelson". The Register of the Kentucky Historical Society. 105 (2): 287–288. JSTOR 23387893.
- Hadden, Sally E. (2008). "Reviewed work: Plantation Enterprise in Colonial South Carolina, S. Max Edelson". The Historian. 70 (1): 106–107. doi:10.1111/j.1540-6563.2008.00205_12.x. JSTOR 24454319. S2CID 145399945.
- Hart, Emma (2008). "Reviewed work: Plantation Enterprise in Colonial South Carolina, S. Max Edelson". The Business History Review. 82 (1): 131–133. doi:10.1017/S0007680500037570. JSTOR 25097466. S2CID 153474357.
- Littlefield, Daniel C. (2008). "Reviewed work: Plantation Enterprise in Colonial South Carolina, S. Max Edelson". Agricultural History. 82 (4): 551–552. doi:10.1215/00021482-82.4.551. JSTOR 20454899. S2CID 247812376.
- Mancall, Peter C. (2008). "Reviewed work: Plantation Enterprise in Colonial South Carolina, S. Max Edelson". The Journal of Economic History. 68 (3): 943–945. doi:10.1017/S0022050708000740. JSTOR 40056448.
- Massey, Gregory D. (2008). "Reviewed work: Plantation Enterprise in Colonial South Carolina, S. Max Edelson". The Journal of Southern History. 74 (1): 147–149. JSTOR 27650068.
- Moltke-Hansen, David (2013). "Reviewed work: Plantation Enterprise in Colonial South Carolina, S. Max Edelson". Journal of Social History. 46 (4): 1095–1097. doi:10.1093/jsh/shs079. JSTOR 43306102.
- Olwell, Robert (2008). "Reviewed work: Plantation Enterprise in Colonial South Carolina, S. Max Edelson". The Journal of Interdisciplinary History. 38 (3): 466–467. doi:10.1162/jinh.2008.38.3.466. JSTOR 20143674. S2CID 195826037.
- Racine, Philip N. (2007). "Reviewed work: Plantation Enterprise in Colonial South Carolina, S. Max Edelson". The North Carolina Historical Review. 84 (1): 102–103. JSTOR 23523292.
- Weir, Robert M. (2007). "Reviewed work: Plantation Enterprise in Colonial South Carolina, S. Max Edelson". The South Carolina Historical Magazine. 108 (4): 318–320. JSTOR 27570920.
- Whitman, T. Stephen (2009). "Reviewed work: Plantation Enterprise in Colonial South Carolina, S. Max Edelson". The Georgia Historical Quarterly. 93 (1): 107–109. JSTOR 40585122.
- Young, Jeffrey Robert (2008). "Reviewed work: Plantation Enterprise in Colonial South Carolina, S. Max Edelson". The American Historical Review. 113 (2): 488–489. doi:10.1086/ahr.113.2.488. JSTOR 30222894.

== Citation ==
- Edelson, S. M. (2006). Plantation Enterprise in Colonial South Carolina. Harvard University Press.

== About the author ==
S. Max Edelson is an author, historian, and professor of history at the University of Virginia in Charlottesville. Their research focuses on colonial American history, the British Atlantic world, and the impact of cartography on history and colonialism.

== Similar or related works ==
- Red, White, and Black Make Blue by Andrea Feeser
- Money, Trade, and Power: The Evolution of Colonial South Carolina's Plantation Society, by Jack P. Greene
- That Most Precious Merchandise: The Mediterranean Trade in Black Sea Slaves, 1260–1500, by Hannah Barker
- Christian Ritual and the Creation of British Slave Societies, 1650–1780, by Nicholas M. Beasley

== See also ==
- History of South Carolina
- List of plantations in South Carolina
- South Carolina slave codes
- The Negro Law of South Carolina
