= That Most Precious Merchandise =

2019 book by Hannah Barker

That Most Precious Merchandise: The Mediterranean Trade in Black Sea Slaves, 1260–1500
- Book cover
- Author: Hannah Barker
- Language: English
- Subject: Black Sea, Mediterranean, Slave trade
- Genre: History, Non-fiction
- Publisher: University of Pennsylvania Press
- Publication date: 2019 (hardback, ebook), 2022 (paperback)
- Pages: 328 (hardback)
- ISBN: 978-0-8122-5154-8
- Website: University of Pennsylvania Press

That Most Precious Merchandise: The Mediterranean Trade in Black Sea Slaves, 1260–1500 is a book by Hannah Barker, published by University of Pennsylvania Press in 2019.

Drawing on both Latin and Arabic sources, the author presents a study of the medieval slave trade between the Black Sea area and Italy and the Near East. The book looks into the role major Italian trading powers such as Genoa and Venice played in the slave trade, as well as the Mamluk sultanate, which held control over Egypt and the Levantine coast.

The book was awarded the Paul E. Lovejoy Prize in 2019 by the Journal of Global Slavery.

== Structure ==
The book contains normal front material and an introduction followed by seven chapters and a conclusion, with a bibliography and index.

- Introduction
1. Chapter 1: Slavery in the Late Medieval Mediterranean
2. Chapter 2: Difference and the Perception of Slave Status
3. Chapter 3: Societies with Slaves: Genoa, Venice, and the Mamluk Sultanate
4. Chapter 4: The Slave Market and the Act of Sale
5. Chapter 5: Making Slaves in the Black Sea
6. Chapter 6: Constraining Disorder: Merchants, States, and the Structure of the Slave Trade
7. Chapter 7: Crusade, Embargo, and the Trade in Mamluk Slaves
- Conclusion, bibliography, index

== Academic journal reviews ==
- Carr, Mike (2021). "That Most Precious Merchandise: The Mediterranean Trade in Black Sea Slaves, 1260–1500. Hannah Barker (Philadelphia, PA: University of Pennsylvania Press, 2019). Pp. 328. ISBN: 9780812251548". International Journal of Middle East Studies. 53 (3): 551–552. doi:10.1017/S0020743821000647. S2CID 239084395.
- De Lucia, Lori (2021). "That Most Precious Merchandise: The Mediterranean Trade in Black Sea Slaves, 1260–1500 by Hannah Barker". Digital Philology: A Journal of Medieval Cultures. 10: 140–142. doi:10.1353/dph.2021.0007.
- Fontaine, Janel, "That Most Precious Merchandise: The Mediterranean Trade in Black Sea Slaves, 1260-1500", Reviews in History, Institute of Historical Research, University of London
- Hagedorn, Jan H. (2020). "Review: That Most Precious Merchandise: The Mediterranean Trade in Black Sea Slaves, 1260–1500, by Hannah Barker". Journal of Medieval Worlds. 2 (3–4): 141–143. doi:10.1525/jmw.2020.2.3-4.141. S2CID 234568078.
- Strand, K. (2023), Book Review – That Most Precious Merchandise: The Mediterranean Trade in Black Sea Slaves, 1260-1500, by Hannah Barker
- Weiss, Gillian (2023). "The Black Sea Slave Trade". The American Historical Review. 128 (2): 963–965. doi:10.1093/ahr/rhab505.
- White, Joshua M. (2022). "That most precious merchandise: The Mediterranean trade in Black Sea slaves, 1260–1500". Mediterranean Historical Review. 37: 111–114. doi:10.1080/09518967.2022.2055929. S2CID 250025036.
- Zhang, Angela (2020). "Reviewed work: That Most Precious Merchandise: The Mediterranean Trade in Black Sea Slaves, 1260–1500, Hannah Barker". Renaissance and Reformation / Renaissance et Réforme. 43 (3): 276–278. doi:10.33137/rr.v43i3.35319. JSTOR 26991328. S2CID 234449163.

== Citation ==
- Barker, Hannah (2019). That Most Precious Merchandise. University of Pennsylvania Press. ISBN 978-0-8122-5154-8. JSTOR j.ctv16t6ckk.

== About the author ==
Hannah Barker is an author, historian, and associate professor of history at Arizona State University. Their research focuses on late medieval Mediterranean and the Black Sea history. They earned their Ph.D. in history from Columbia University.

== Similar or related works ==
- Plantation Enterprise in Colonial South Carolina
- The Other Slavery: The Uncovered Story of Indian Enslavement in America
- Red, White, and Black Make Blue: Indigo in the Fabric of Colonial South Carolina Life
- Christian Ritual and the Creation of British Slave Societies, 1650–1780

== See also ==
- Italian city-states
- Slavery in medieval Europe
