= Highland Lawn =

Highland Lawn is a subdivision in Boulder, Colorado. The subdivision contains a concentration of well-preserved buildings reflecting the prevailing architectural tastes at the turn of the twentieth century, including Queen Anne style, Classic Cottage, and Victorian house vernacular styles. Hannah Connell Barker platted the middle-class neighborhood in 1884 as the Town of Highland Lawn. The area is significant for its association with historic persons and events and as an excellent collection of buildings reflecting architectural styles of the period. The City of Boulder has established the Highland Lawn Historic District encompassing a large portion of the original subdivision.

== History ==
The historic district of Highland Lawn was created in 1884.

The land was originally sold to Jonas Anderson for $200 after the Homestead Act of 1862 was passed. A decade later, the land changed hands to Thomas J. Graham for $32,000 and was mainly used mainly as an orchard at the time.
