= Peter S. Onuf =

American historian and professor

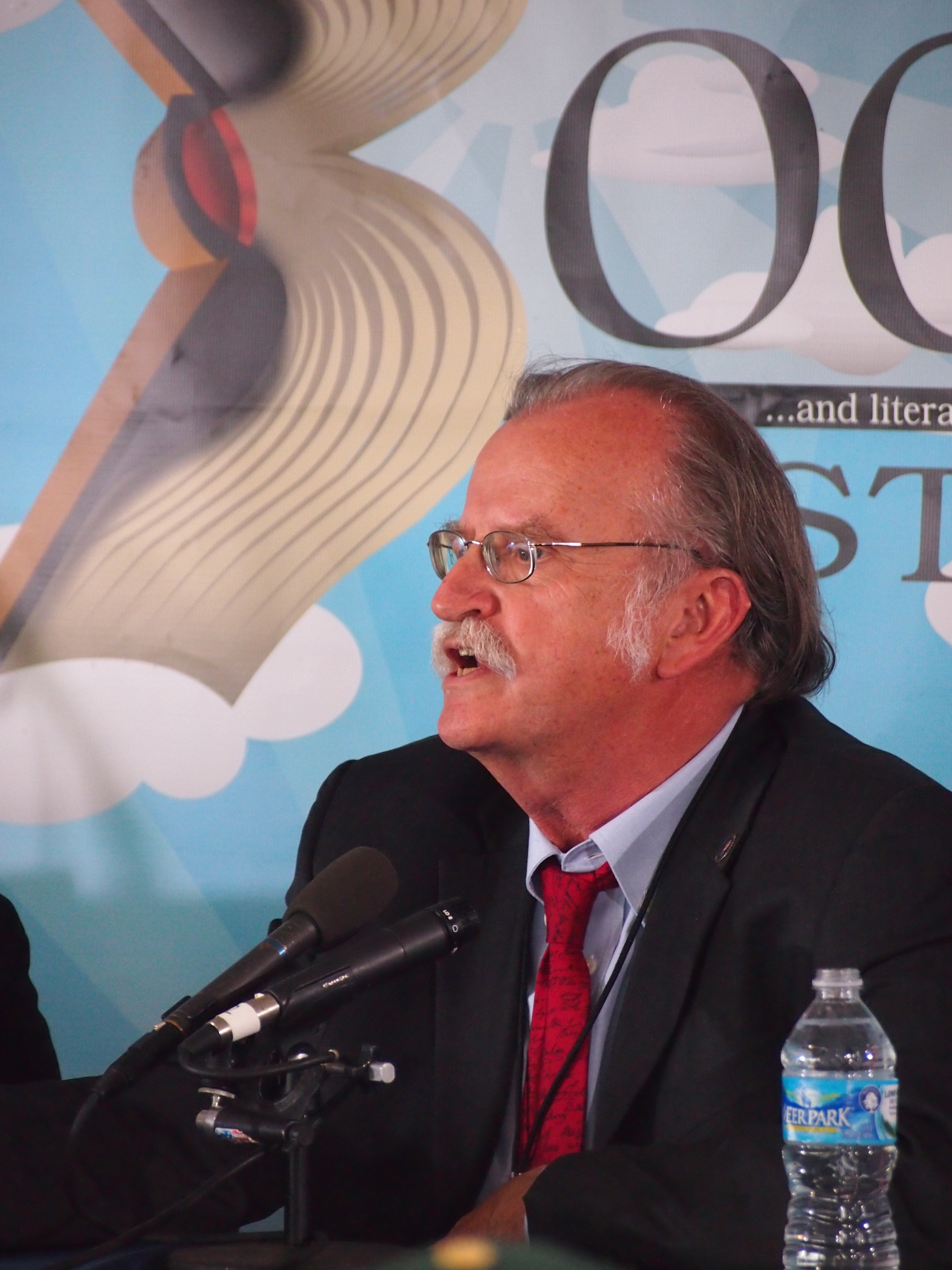
- Onuf in 2016
- Born: 1946 (age 79–80)

Academic background
- Education: Johns Hopkins University

Academic work
- Discipline: History
- Institutions: University of Virginia, University of Oxford, Columbia University, Worcester Polytechnic Institute, Southern Methodist University

Peter S. Onuf (born 1946) is an American historian and professor known for his work on U.S. President Thomas Jefferson and Federalism. In 1989, he was named the Thomas Jefferson Memorial Foundation Professor of the University of Virginia, a chair he held until retiring in 2012. The chair's previous occupants included Jefferson biographers Dumas Malone and Merrill D. Peterson; he was succeeded by Alan Taylor.

== Life ==
A native New Englander, Onuf graduated from Johns Hopkins University, where he worked with eminent early American historian Jack P. Greene. He taught at Columbia University, Worcester Polytechnic Institute, and Southern Methodist University. In 2008, he held the Harold Vyvyan Harmsworth Professor of American History chair at the University of Oxford.

Onuf also acted as a cohost for the radio show BackStory with the American History Guys. In 2014, he taught a free online University of Virginia course on Thomas Jefferson.

== Publications ==
- ed. (with Robert M. S. McDonald). Revolutionary Prophecies: The Founders and America's Future. Charlottesville: University of Virginia Press, 2021. ISBN 9780813944494
- ed. (with John A. Ragosta and Andrew J. O'Shaughnessy). The Founding of Thomas Jefferson's University. Charlottesville: University of Virginia Press, 2019. ISBN 9780813943220
- (with Annette Gordon-Reed) "Most Blessed of the Patriarchs": Thomas Jefferson and the Empire of the Imagination, Liveright, 2016. ISBN 9780871404428
- ed. (with Patrick Griffin, Robert G. Ingram, and Brian Schoen). Between Sovereignty and Anarchy: The Politics of Violence in the American Revolutionary Era. Charlottesville: University of Virginia Press, 2015. ISBN 9780813936789
- ed. (with Simon P. Newman). Paine and Jefferson in the Age of Revolutions. Charlottesville: University of Virginia Press, 2013. ISBN 9780813934761
- ed. (with Peter Thompson). State and Citizen: British America and the Early United States. Charlottesville: University of Virginia Press, 2013. ISBN 9780813933498
- ed. (with Nicholas P. Cole). Thomas Jefferson, the Classical World, and Early America. Charlottesville: University of Virginia Press, 2011. ISBN 9780813931821
- The Mind of Thomas Jefferson. Charlottesville: University of Virginia Press, 2007. ISBN 9780813926117
- (with Nicholas G. Onuf). Nations, Markets, and War: Modern History and the American Civil War, Charlottesville: University of Virginia Press, 2006. ISBN 9780813925028
- ed. (with James Horn and Jan Ellen Lewis). The Revolution of 1800: Democracy, Race, and the New Republic. Charlottesville: University of Virginia Press, 2002. ISBN 9780813921419
- Jefferson's Empire: The Language of American Nationhood. Charlottesville: University Press of Virginia, 2001. ISBN 9780813920900
- (with Leonard Sadosky) Jeffersonian America. Oxford: Basil Blackwell's, 2001. ISBN 9781557869234
- ed. (with Jan Ellen Lewis). Sally Hemings and Thomas Jefferson: History, Memory, and Civic Culture. University Press of Virginia, 1999. ISBN 9780813919485
- (with Edward L. Ayers, Patricia N. Limerick, and Stephen Nissenbaum). All Over the Map: Rethinking Region and Nation in the United States. Johns Hopkins University Press, 1996.
- ed. Jeffersonian Legacies. University Press of Virginia, 1993. ISBN 9780813914633
- (with Nicholas G. Onuf), Federal Union, Modern World: The Law of Nations in an Age of Revolution, 1776–1814. Madison House, 1993.
- Patriots, redcoats, and loyalists New York : Garland, 1991. ISBN 9780815304371
- (with Cathy D. Matson), A Union of Interests: Politics and Economics in Revolutionary America, University Press of Kansas. 1990.
- (with Andrew R. L. Cayton), The Midwest and the Nation. Indiana University Press, 1990.
- Statehood and Union: A History of the Northwest Ordinance. Indiana University Press, 1987.
- Origins of the Federal Republic: Jurisdictional Controversies in the United States, 1775–1787. University of Pennsylvania Press, 1983.
