= Alan Gallay =

American historian (born 1957)

- Born: 1957 (age 68–69)
- Occupation: Historian
- Notable work: The Indian Slave Trade: the Rise of the English Empire in the American South, 1670-1717

Alan Gallay is an American historian. He specializes in the Atlantic World and Early American history, including issues of slavery. He won the Bancroft Prize in 2003 for his The Indian Slave Trade: the Rise of the English Empire in the American South, 1670-1717.

== Life ==
He graduated from University of Florida, and earned an M.A. and Ph.D. from Georgetown University.

Gallay has taught at the University of Notre Dame, University of Mississippi, Western Washington University, Harvard University and the University of Auckland, as a Fulbright Lecturer. He previously held the Warner R. Woodring Chair in Atlantic World and Early American History, and was Director of The Center for Historical Research at Ohio State University. Twice he taught for the American Heritage Association in London.

He currently holds the Lyndon B. Johnson Chair of U.S. History at Texas Christian University.

== Awards ==
- Andrew W. Mellon Faculty Fellow in the Humanities, Harvard University 1990-1991
- J. William Fulbright Lecturer in Colonial American History, University of Auckland, Auckland, New Zealand 1992
- National Endowment for the Humanities Fellowship for College Teachers and Independent Scholars 1990–1991, 1997-1998
- 2003 Bancroft Prize
- 2004 Washington State Book Award

== Works ==
- The Formation of a Planter Elite: Jonathan Bryan and the Southern Colonial Frontier. University of Georgia Press. 2007. ISBN 978-0-8203-3018-1.
- Alan Gallay, ed. (1994). Voices of the Old South: Eyewitness Accounts, 1528-1861. University of Georgia Press. ISBN 978-0-8203-1566-9. "Alan Gallay."
- Alan Gallay, ed. (2020). The Colonial Wars of North America, 1512-1763: An Encyclopedia. Routledge. ISBN 978-1138891098.
- The Indian Slave Trade: the Rise of the English Empire in the American South, 1670-1717. Yale University Press. 2003. ISBN 978-0-300-10193-5.
- Indian Slavery in Colonial America. University of Nebraska Press. 2010. ISBN 978-0-8032-2200-7.
- Colonial and Revolutionary America, Prentice Hall 2010, ISBN 978-0-205-80969-1
- "Forgotten Story of Indian Slavery", Race and History, 2003
- Walter Ralegh: Architect of Empire. Basic Books, 2019. ISBN 978-1541645790
- "Defining the European Frontier City in Early Modern Asia: Goa, Macau, and Manila," in Frontier Cities: Encounters at the Crossroads of Empire, eds., Jay Gitlin et al. University of Pennsylvania Press, 2012.
- John B. Boles, ed. (1988). "Planters and Slaves in the Great Awakening". Masters & Slaves in the House of the Lord: Race and Religion in the American South, 1740-1870. University Press of Kentucky. p. 19. ISBN 978-0-8131-0187-3. "Alan Gallay."
