= Ronald L. Holt =

Ronald L. Holt (born 1949) is a professor of anthropology at Weber State University who in 1992 was the Democratic candidate for Utah's 1st congressional district. He was awarded a Fulbright Fellowship for Belarus in 2004. In 2008 he was the lead social scientist on an Army (101st 4th Brigade) Human Terrain Team in Afghanistan. In 2010–12 he was the Culture and Foreign Language Advisor on the staff of the commanding general at the Maneuver Center of Excellence at Fort Benning, GA. In August 2012 he returned to his tenured position in the Department of Sociology and Anthropology at Weber State University in Ogden, Utah.

Holt wrote a dissertation titled Beneath These Red Cliffs: An Ethnohistory of the Utah Paiutes. It was subsequently published in 1992.

== Career ==
Holt earned a Bachelor of Arts degree in Anthropology and History from Texas Tech University during 1974. He earned a Master of Arts with honors in Anthropology two years later. He received a Ph.D. in Anthropology from the University of Utah during 1987.

Holt was an instructor and teaching assistant at the University of Utah from 1979 to 1981. He taught at Southern Utah State College during the 1981-1982 academic year. He returned to the University of Utah as an Anthropology instructor through 1986. He accepted a position in the Anthropology Department at Weber State University during 1986.
