= Barker Meadow Reservoir =

Barker Reservoir
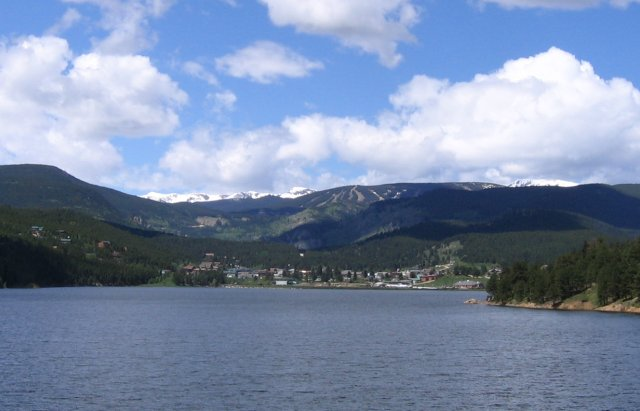

- Location within Colorado Location within the United States
- Location: Boulder County, Colorado, United States
- Coordinates: 39°57′55″N 105°29′34″W
- Type: reservoir
- Basin countries: United States
- Surface area: 1.70 km^{2} (0.66 sq mi)
- Average depth: 8.3 m (27 ft)
- Max. depth: 36.6 m (120 ft)
- Water volume: 14.185×10^{6} m^{3} (11,500 acre⋅ft)
- Residence time: 104 days
- Surface elevation: 8,183 ft (2,494 m)

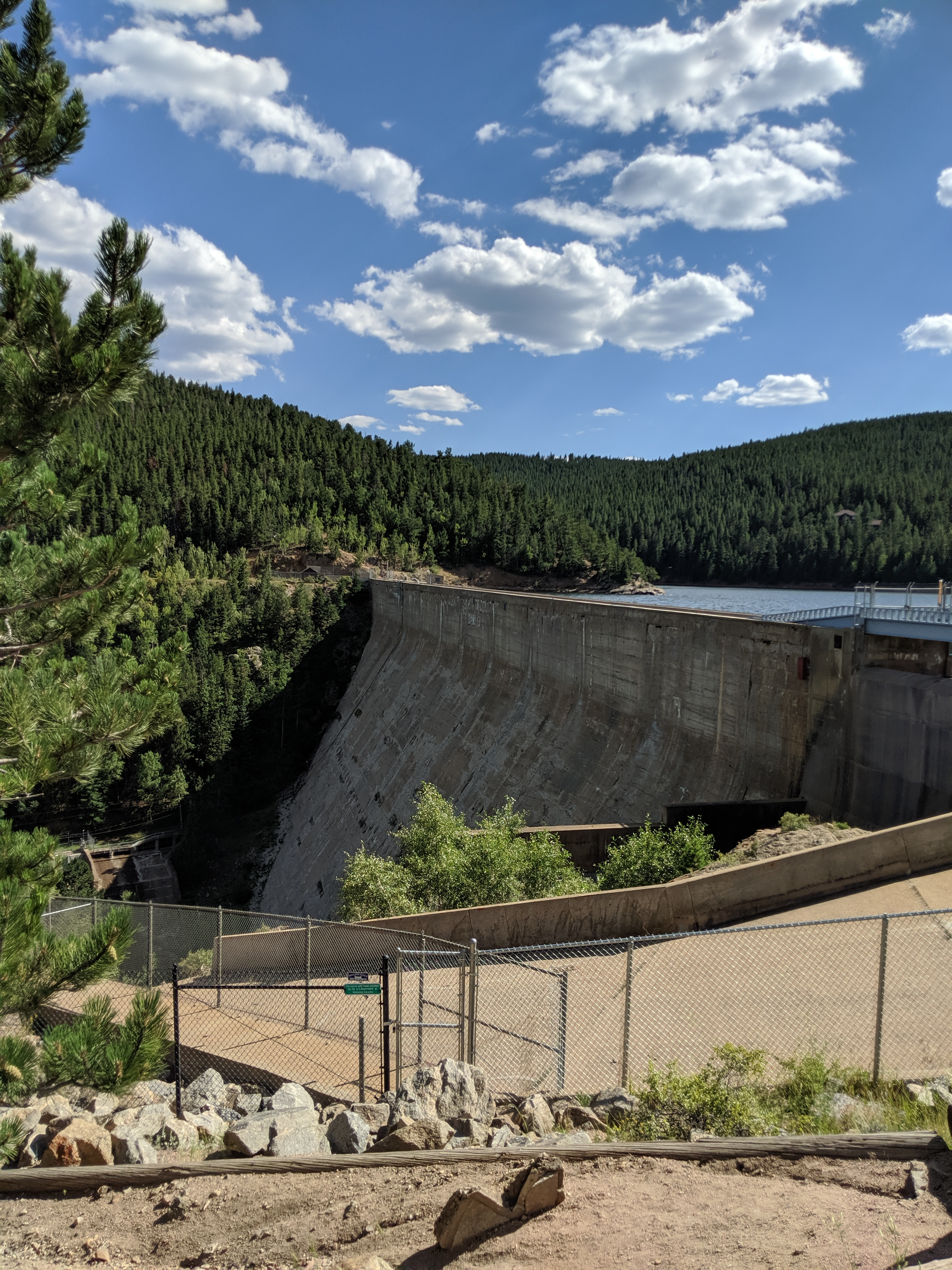
Barker Dam

Barker Reservoir is a water supply reservoir in the Colorado Front Range located near the town of Nederland, Colorado in southwestern Boulder County.

Barker Dam provides water to a downstream hydroelectric power generating facility, and its reservoir provides water to the city of Boulder, Colorado.

== History ==
In 1908, the Central Colorado Power Company began construction of Barker Dam to provide electricity to nearby mining communities and the city of Denver. Completed in 1910, the dam and Barker Reservoir were named for the owner of the land, Mrs. Hannah Connell Barker. Mrs. Barker refused to sell the land to the utility but was eventually forced to do so through a process similar to the contemporary legal procedure of eminent domain. The dam was constructed by hauling concrete and other materials along a specially constructed spur of the Switzerland Trail narrow-gauge railroad, which went bankrupt and was broken up in 1919.

In 2001 the city of Boulder purchased the reservoir, dam, and associated facilities. The city operates the reservoir primarily for municipal water supply and secondarily to generate hydroelectric power. An aqueduct with an inlet just below the dam supplies water to Kossler Reservoir. There is then a 1828-foot drop to a hydroelectric plant near the base of Boulder Canyon, several miles downstream.
