= Andrés Reséndez =

American historian

- Occupations: Historian; professor
- Awards: Bancroft Prize (2017)

Academic background
- Education: El Colegio de México (B.A.); University of Chicago (Ph.D.)

Academic work
- Institutions: Yale University; University of Helsinki; University of California, Davis
- Main interests: Mexican history

Andrés Reséndez is a Mexican-born American historian at the University of California, Davis. His specialties are Mexican history, early exploration and colonization of the Americas and the Pacific Ocean, and borderlands history.

== Early life ==
Reséndez grew up in Mexico City.

== Education and career ==
He received his Bachelor's degree in International relations at el Colegio de México in 1992 and worked in the Mexican government briefly around that time. In 1997, he received his Ph.D. in history at the University of Chicago where his dissertation adviser was Friedrich Katz. During his years as a graduate student, Reséndez served as a consultant for historical soap operas. He went on to teach at Yale University and University of Helsinki. He is currently a professor in the Department of History at the University of California, Davis.

== Honors ==
In 2017, Reséndez won the Bancroft Prize in American History and Diplomacy for The Other Slavery: The Uncovered Story of Indian Enslavement in America.

Inducted into the American Academy of Arts and Sciences, 2021

== Books ==
- Conquering the Pacific: An Unknown Mariner and the Final Great Voyage of the Age of Discovery, Houghton Mifflin Harcourt, 2021.
- The Other Slavery: The Uncovered Story of Indian Enslavement in America, Houghton Mifflin Harcourt, 2016.
- A Land So Strange: The Epic Journey of Cabeza de Vaca, Basic Books, 2007.
- Changing National Identities at the Frontier: Texas and New Mexico, 1800–1850, Cambridge University Press. 2005.
- A Texas Patriot on Trial in Mexico: José Antonio Navarro and the Texan Santa Fe Expedition, edited and translated with an introduction and notes by Andrés Reséndez. Dallas: DeGolyer Library/Clements Center for Southwest Studies, 2005.
- Caught Between Profits and Rituals: National Contestation in Texas and New Mexico, 1821–1848, University of Chicago, 1997

== See also ==
- Slavery in the colonial history of the United States
- Population history of the Indigenous peoples of the Americas
- Slavery among the indigenous peoples of the Americas
- Slavery in New Spain
