= Hannah Connell Barker =

American businesswoman (1844–1918)

Hannah Connell Barker (1844–1918) was an early resident of Boulder, Colorado. Barker was a teacher, civic leader, businesswoman and land developer in an era when industrious women were not commonly recognized for their contributions. Among other things, Barker served as a teacher; as director of the Boulder Bank; and was instrumental in platting and developing significant parts of the City of Boulder. She also owned the land that was used for the construction of Barker Meadow Reservoir, Boulder's primary source of water.

== Early life ==
Born in 1844 as Hannah Connell, Barker and her family emigrated from Ireland to Massachusetts in 1852. After spending time in Massachusetts and Iowa, she crossed the Great Plains with two other early immigrants to Boulder County, Colorado: her lifelong friend, Mary Davidson, and Davidson's husband, William (after whom Davidson Mesa in Boulder was named), and at some point along the way obtained a college education. In 1867, Barker settled in Ward, Colorado, not far from the City of Boulder, Colorado, where she taught school in a saloon, providing a civilizing influence on the children of local miners whose parents did not always have a favorable view of book learning. In 1869, Barker moved to Boulder, Colorado, where she taught in the newly created Boulder Valley School District.

In 1877, she married Ezra Barker, a local businessman with extensive real estate holdings, and gave up teaching. Hannah and Ezra Barker had no children together though Ezra had a daughter, Josephine, from a previous marriage. Just six years after their marriage, Ezra Barker died in 1883, leaving most of his property to Hannah Barker. That property included a ranch in Boulder Canyon near the town of Nederland, Colorado. In the early years of the 20th Century, the Central Colorado Power Company wanted to buy the ranch to build a hydroelectric dam to supply electricity to mining camps and the City of Denver. Barker refused to sell the land but was eventually forced to part with it after the city commenced condemnation proceedings. Barker Reservoir, which was completed in 1910, was named for Hannah Barker.

== Businesswoman and civic leader ==
In the 1880s, Barker set to work on a number of significant business endeavors. By 1884, Barker had purchased real estate adjacent to the young City of Boulder and began platting the town of Highland Lawn. Owners were encouraged to plant trees (though not cottonwoods). The town was annexed to the City of Boulder in 1891.

In association with several other local women, Hannah Barker formed the Boulder Creamery in 1887. Hannah Barker was appointed to the board of directors of Boulder Bank. In addition to her business endeavors, Barker was involved in numerous civic causes. Barker founded the Boulder Women's Club and was active in the Ladies' Literary Society and the Boulder Fortnightly Club. She was also active in supporting Boulder's Congregational Church and Columbia Cemetery and was a member of Boulder's Colorado Chautauqua Association. In 1911, she donated land to the City of Boulder at the corner of 15th and Spruce Streets for use as Barker Park. Barker was also active in a number of temperance movement causes.

Hannah Barker died in Boulder in 1918 of either arteriosclerosis or influenza (or a combination of the two) during the Spanish Flu Pandemic.

== Hannah Barker House ==
- Hannah Barker House
- U.S. National Register of Historic Places
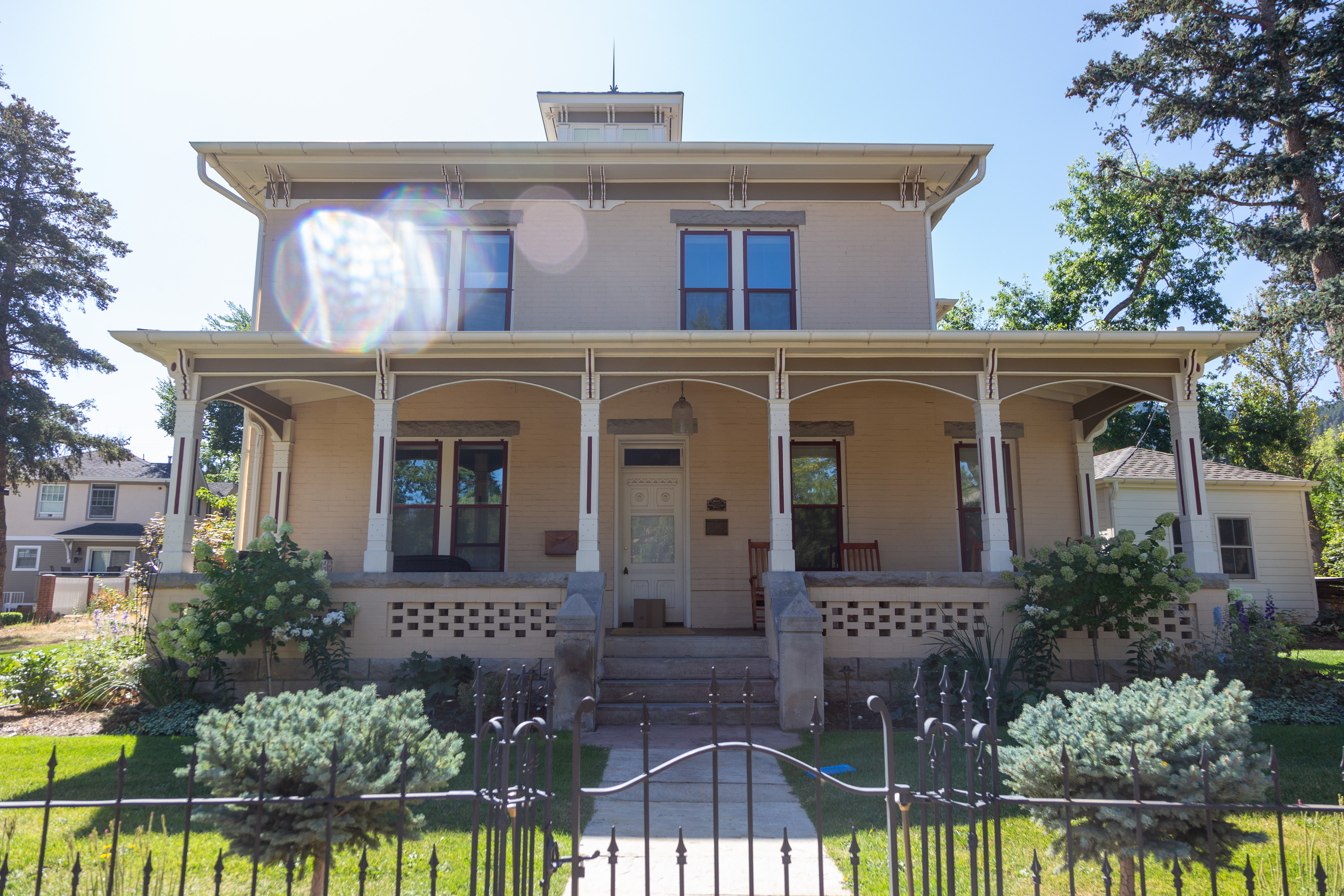
- House in 2019

- Location within Colorado
- Location: 800 Arapahoe Ave., Boulder
- Coordinates: 40.0129°N 105.2847°W
- Area: less than one acre
- NRHP reference No.: 100004376
- Added to NRHP: September 12, 2019

Barker lived a great part of her life in a stately home on a large lot in the Highland Lawn subdivision she developed. Ezra Barker purchased the house, located at 800 Arapahoe Avenue and built in 1875, months before he met Hannah Barker in 1877. It is one of the oldest homes in Boulder.

On her death, Barker willed the house to her longtime friend, Mary Davidson, who had lived with Barker in the house for many years and who resided in the house until her death in 1923. During the 20th Century the house had been used as a single family residence and an apartment building. At one time, plans were made to use the Hannah Barker House as a bed and breakfast.

In 2010, the Hannah Barker House was donated to Historic Boulder. Boulder's City Council unanimously designated the Hannah Barker House as an individual landmark on March 17, 2009. The house, which was structurally unstable, was restored by Historic Boulder and sold to a private party in 2016.

The house was listed on the National Register of Historic Places in 2019.
