= Christian Ritual and the Creation of British Slave Societies, 1650–1780 =

2009 book by Nicholas M. Beasley

- Author: Nicholas M. Beasley
- Language: English
- Subject: History of Christianity, History of Slavery, History of Great Britain
- Genre: Non-fiction, history
- Publisher: University of Georgia Press
- Publication date: 2009
- Pages: 240
- ISBN: 978-0820333397
- Website: University of Georgia Press

Christian Ritual and the Creation of British Slave Societies, 1650–1780 is a book by Nicholas M. Beasley published in 2009 by University of Georgia Press. This work presents a perspective on Christian institutions and customs in the Caribbean and Southern American colonies of Britain and how they influenced and impacted the institution of slavery between 1650 and 1780. It is part of the Race in the Atlantic World, 1700–1900 series published by University of Georgia Press.

== Structure ==
The work contains normal front material and six content chapters:

1. Christian Ritual in British Slave Societies
2. Ritual Time and Space in the British Plantation Colonies
3. Marriage and Baptism in the British Plantation Colonies
4. The Meanings of the Eucharist in the Plantation World
5. Mortuary Ritual in the British Plantation Colonies
6. Revolution, Evangelicalisms, and the Fragmentation of Anglo-America

It concludes with a bibliography and index.

== Academic journal reviews ==
- Young, Jason R. (2010). "Reviewed work: Christian Ritual and the Creation of British Slave Societies, 1650–1780, Nicholas M. Beasley". The American Historical Review. 115 (2): 506–507. doi:10.1086/ahr.115.2.506. JSTOR 23302597.
- Irons, Charles F. (2010). "Reviewed work: Christian Ritual and the Creation of British Slave Societies, 1650–1780. Race in the Atlantic World, 1700–1900, Nicholas M. Beasley". Church History. 79 (4): 936–938. doi:10.1017/S0009640710001319. JSTOR 40962896. S2CID 163207517.
- Blosser, Jacob M. (2010). "Reviewed work: Christian Ritual and the Creation of British Slave Societies, 1650–1780, Nicholas M. Beasley". The South Carolina Historical Magazine. 111 (1/2): 83–85. JSTOR 23057385.
- Little, Thomas J. (2010). "Reviewed work: Christian Ritual and the Creation of British Slave Societies, 1650–1780, Nicholas M. Beasley". The Journal of Southern History. 76 (3): 690–691. JSTOR 25700150.

== Publication history ==
- Beasley, Nicholas (2009). Christian Ritual and the Creation of British Slave Societies, 1650–1780 (Hardcover ed.). University of Georgia Press.
- Beasley, Nicholas (2010). Christian Ritual and the Creation of British Slave Societies, 1650–1780 (Paperback ed.). University of Georgia Press.

== About the author ==
Nicholas M. Beasley is the rector at the Church of the Resurrection located in Greenwood, South Carolina.

== Similar or related works ==
- Christian Slaves, Muslim Masters: White Slavery in the Mediterranean, the Barbary Coast, and Italy, 1500–1800
- Popular Politics and British Anti-Slavery: The Mobilisation of Public Opinion against the Slave Trade 1787–1807
- That Most Precious Merchandise: The Mediterranean Trade in Black Sea Slaves, 1260–1500
- Plantation Enterprise in Colonial South Carolina

== See also ==
- History of Christianity
- History of Slavery
- History of Great Britain
