= Jack P. Greene =

American historian (born 1931)

Jack Philip Greene
- Born: August 12, 1931 (age 95); Lafayette, Indiana, U.S.
- Education: Duke University
- Known for: His prolific studies of colonial British America, and the American Revolution
- Awards: Member of American Philosophical Society, the American Academy of Arts and Sciences
- Scientific career
- Fields: Colonial American history Atlantic history
- Workplaces: Johns Hopkins University; Michigan State University; Western Reserve University; University of Michigan
- Doctoral students: Joyce Chaplin, Peter S. Onuf

Jack Philip Greene (born August 12, 1931) is an American historian, specializing in Colonial American history and Atlantic history.

Greene was born in Lafayette, Indiana and received his PhD from Duke University in 1956. He spent most of his career as Andrew W. Mellon Professor in the Humanities at Johns Hopkins University’s history department. In 1990-1999 he was a Distinguished Professor at the University of California, Irvine, and he has been a visiting professor at the College of William and Mary, Oxford University, the Hebrew University of Jerusalem, the Ecole des Hautes Etudes en Sciences Sociales, University of Richmond, Michigan State University, and the Freie Universitat of Berlin, and has held fellowships from the John Simon Guggenheim Foundation, the Institute for Advanced Study, the Woodrow Wilson International Center for Scholars, the Center for Advanced Study in the Behavioral Sciences, the National Humanities Center, and the Andrew W. Mellon Foundation, among others. In 1975-1976 Greene was the Harold Vyvyan Harmsworth Professor of American History at Oxford University. He was a member of both the American Philosophical Society and the American Academy of Arts and Sciences.

Greene retired in 2005 and is currently an Invited Research Scholar at the John Carter Brown Library at Brown University.

== Scholarly work ==
=== Political history ===
Greene first studied the broad area of imperial and colonial governance, in particular the ongoing process of polity formation in the British Empire between the Glorious Revolution and the American Revolution, a subject that he would continue to explore throughout his career and with which he is still closely associated.

His first book The Quest for Power (1963) was a study in the transfer of political and constitutional traditions, values, institutions, and practices from England to America. Focusing on the development of institutions in four British North American colonies (Virginia, North Carolina, South Carolina, and Georgia), the book stresses the growing sophistication and authority of those bodies as they expanded the scope of legislative jurisdiction over their domestic affairs throughout the late seventeenth- and eighteenth centuries.

The Quest for Power served as the foundation for Greene's subsequent elaboration of a theory of early modern imperial development that has altered the way many scholars think about the nature of the early modern British Empire and has influenced students of other European empires. Greene went on to underscore (particularly in Peripheries and Center (1986) and Negotiated Authorities (1994)) the extent to which the British Empire was not a polity in which authority flowed from the center to the peripheries, but was the product of a continuous process of negotiation in which the weakness of central coercive and fiscal resources dictated that the peripheries should exert authority over local affairs and that dominant settler groups should enjoy enormous agency in the construction of both the colonies in which they lived and the larger empire of which they were part of.

In Peripheries and Center (1986) Greene re-examined the long debate between Britain and the colonies over how far the British Parliament’s authority extended in the colonies. The book made a case for the proposition that the dispute was primarily a legal and constitutional one over the nature of the imperial constitution, similar to legal historians writing at the same time, especially John P. Reid. Greene stressed the legitimacy of the colonial constitutional position and argued for the importance of the legal and constitutional dimensions of American Revolutionary thought, underlining the continuity between the colonial and Revolutionary eras. Showing that the empire functioned as an implicit federal state, with the internal affairs of the colonies coming under the jurisdiction of colonial governments in each colony, and external affairs such as trade regulation, diplomacy, and war falling under the authority of the central government in Britain, Peripheries and Center also explored the extent to which the post-1787 American federal government marked a re-institution of the imperial system. In The Constitutional Origins of the American Revolution (2010) Greene revisited the same issues with an emphasis on the late eighteenth century

=== The American Revolution and the early American nation ===
In his work, Greene has emphasized the continuities between the colonial era and the revolutionary and early national eras and thereby challenged interpretations of the American Revolution that highlight its transformative and socially and politically radical character. Greene suggests that many of the changes associated with the Revolution (such as in social values, in state organization, in geographical expansion, and in legal systems) were the results of a social trajectory that was deeply rooted in the colonial past and would have occurred with or without the break with Britain; he also proposes that until the middle of the twentieth century the United States continued to be a truly federal polity, in which the political power remained in the states and the citizens’ experience with governance was primarily provincial and local, rather than national.

=== Social and cultural history ===
Since the early 1960s Greene has contributed many essays to define the questions that new scholarly work was opening up in various areas in the history of Colonial America. In the same vein Greene conceived and edited with J. R. Pole Colonial British America (1984), a collection of essays that assessed the state of the field in the early 1980s and set the agenda for further study. In a series of papers, many of which appeared in a four-volume collection of essays, Greene treated a number of themes in early American cultural, social, political and constitutional history. Of particular note, he underlined in these essays the extent to which the libertarian regimes created by colonists throughout the British Empire were highly exclusionary, calling attention to the fact that the settler liberty so much celebrated by contemporaries was often dependent upon, and defined by, the systematic denial of civic space to groups who often constituted the majority of the population: aborigines, imported slaves, unpropertied whites, women, and non-Protestants. Challenging the conventional presentation of the colonizing process as a benign process of land conversion that had few social costs, this work has highlighted the normative inequality in the societies Britons created in America and the continuity of social ideas and practices from Britain to places overseas. Greene explored this subject more generally for the entire British imperial settler empire down to 1900 in the introduction to a collection of essays he edited, in Exclusionary Empire: British Liberty Overseas, 1600 to 1900 (2010).

Greene's best known work Pursuits of Happiness (1988) constructed a vastly influential new synthesis of colonial British American history and proposed a framework for a developmental narrative of early American history. Employing a broad regional framework and using the concept of social development as its principal analytic device, Pursuits of Happiness focused on the creation and subsequent histories of colonial regions as defined by the socioeconomic structures and cultural constructs devised and amended by settlers and their descendants to enable them to exploit the economic potentials of their new environments and to express the larger purposes of the societies they were creating. These processes, Greene argues, could not be traced exclusively to either the transfer of civilization from Britain to the Americas or the Americanizing effects of New World conditions. Rather, they were the products of a complex, regionally differentiated interaction between metropolitan inheritance and colonial experience. As a framework for understanding how these social processes worked, Pursuits of Happiness proposed a developmental model that understands the British North American colonial experience as a process of adaptation, institution building, and expansion of human, economic, social, and cultural resources. That model describes and explains the transformations of the simple and inchoate societies of the earliest years of settlement into the ever more complex, differentiated, and articulated societies of the late colonial era. Pursuits of Happiness presents this transformation, which proceeded through a series of phases (social simplification, social elaboration, and social replication) to show the common social processes at work in the regions of colonial British America as well as to direct attention to its variations. In contrast to some of the other attempts at synthesis at that time Pursuits of Happiness argued that overall colonialism did not lead in the direction of cultural divergence from Britain. Rather, it posited a gradual social convergence during the middle decades of the eighteenth century throughout the British Atlantic world. Pursuits of Happiness suggested that the product of this convergence served as a critical precondition for the American Revolution by intensifying demands among colonists for metropolitan recognition of their essential Britishness and thus providing the foundation for the loose political confederation that, after 1775, evolved into the United States.

Pursuits of Happiness is also known for challenging the ideas that the experience of New England was paradigmatic for the colonies as a whole and that its culture was the seedbed of American culture. Greene argued that New England (particularly orthodox Massachusetts and Connecticut) was anomalous in its idea of colonists as a chosen people, its intense religiosity, and its culture that developed in pursuit of a holy society. Everywhere else, from Ireland to Virginia and Barbados to Pennsylvania, Greene pointed out, the emphasis in new English societies was on the pursuit of individual wealth, independence, and status, with settler-dominated colonial governments functioning as an adjunct to the preservation of individual property and status. Greene further argued that New England itself increasingly assimilated to this model during the eighteenth century. Greene explained the inclination to emphasize New England mostly as an unconscious effort to minimize the extent to which the success of Colonial British America and the early United States was rooted in slave labor.

In The Intellectual Construction of America: Exceptionalism and Identity from 1492 to 1800 (1993) Greene explored the early history of the idea of American exceptionalism as it was defined by contemporaries in Europe and America and the social, economic, and legal conditions that supported and defined it

=== Atlantic history ===
Greene has been an advocate for comparative colonial studies across national boundaries since the late 1960s, when he founded the Program in Atlantic History and Culture at Johns Hopkins University, and participated in it for 20 years, establishing himself as a pioneer in Atlantic history many years before its emergence as the significant historiographic school of the past decades. Greene's vision of early America is characterized by its global reach beyond the colonies that would become the United States, drawing the history of early modern Britain, Ireland, and the West Indies into the history of British North America. He has recently edited collections which are fundamental assessments of the "Atlantic turn" (Atlantic History: A Critical Appraisal) and the global history of British imperialism (Exclusionary Empire: English Liberty Overseas, 1600–1900).

== Publications ==
Books

- The Quest for Power: The Lower Houses of Assembly in the Southern Royal Colonies, 1689-1776 (Chapel Hill: University of North Carolina Press for the Institute of Early American History and Culture, 1963).
- Landon Carter: An Inquiry into the Personal Values and Social Imperatives of the Eighteenth-Century Virginia Gentry (Charlottesville: University Press of Virginia, 1967)
- Preachers and Politicians: Two Essays on the Origins of the American Revolution (Worcester, Mass.: American Antiquarian Society, 1977). With William G. McLoughlin
- Peripheries and Center: Constitutional Development in the Extended Polities of the British Empire and the United States, 1607-1789 (Athens: University of Georgia Press, 1986)
- Pursuits of Happiness: The Social Development of the Early Modern British Colonies and the Formation of American Culture (Chapel Hill: University of North Carolina Press, 1988)
- Imperatives, Behaviors, and Identities: Essays in Early American Cultural History (Charlottesville: University Press of Virginia, 1992)
- The Intellectual Construction of America: Exceptionalism and Identity from 1492 to 1800 (Chapel Hill: University of North Carolina Press, 1993)
- Negotiated Authorities: Essays in Colonial Political and Constitutional History (Charlottesville: University Press of Virginia, 1994)
- Explaining the American Revolution: Issues, Interpretations, and Actors (Charlottesville: University Press of Virginia, 1995)
- Interpreting Early America: Historiographical Essays (Charlottesville: University Press of Virginia, 1996)
- The Constitutional Origins of the American Revolution (New York: Cambridge University Press, 2010)
- Creating the British Atlantic: Essays on Transplantation, Adaptation, and Continuity (Charlottesville: University Press of Virginia, 2013)
- Evaluating Empire and Confronting Colonialism in Eighteenth Century Britain (New York: [Cambridge University Press]), 2013
- Settler Jamaica: A Social Portrait of the 1750s (Charlottesville: [University Press of Virginia]) 2016)

Edited Books'

- Preconditions of Revolution in Early Modern Europe (Baltimore: The Johns Hopkins University Press, 1970). With Robert Forster
- Neither Slave, Nor Free: The Freedmen of African Descent in the Slave Societies of the New World (Baltimore: The Johns Hopkins University Press, 1972). With David W. Cohen
- Interdisciplinary Studies of the American Revolution (Beverly Hills and London: SAGE Publications, 1976). With Pauline Maier
- Colonial British America: Essays in the New History of the Early Modern Era (Baltimore: The Johns Hopkins University Press, 1984). With J. R. Pole
- The American Revolution: Its Character and Limits (New York: New York University Press, 1987)
- Money, Trade, and Power: The Evolution of Colonial South Carolina s Plantation Society (Columbia: University of South Carolina Press, 2001). With Randy J. Sparks, and Rosemary Brana-Shute
- Atlantic History: A Critical Reappraisal (New York: Oxford University Press, 2009). With Philip D. Morgan
- Exclusionary Empire: The Transmission of the English Liberty Overseas 1600 to 1900 (New York: Cambridge University Press, 2009)
- Exploring the Bounds of Liberty: Political Writings of Colonial British America from the Glorious Revolution to the American Revolution (Indianapolis: [Liberty Fund, Inc.], 2018) With Craig B. Yirush

Encyclopedias'

- Encyclopedia of American Political History, 3 vols. (New York: Charles Scribner's Sons, 1984)
- The Blackwell Dictionary of Historians (Oxford and New York: Basil Blackwell, 1988). With John Cannon, R.H.C. Davis, and William Doyle
- The Blackwell Encyclopedia of the American Revolution (Oxford: Basil Blackwell, 1991). With J. R. Pole
- The Blackwell Companion to the American Revolution (Oxford: Basil Blackwell, 2000). With J. R. Pole
