= U.S. Route 6 in Colorado =

Section of U.S. Highway in Colorado, United States

U.S. Highway 6
- Grand Army of the Republic Highway
- US 6 highlighted in red

Route information
- Maintained by CDOT
- Length: 467.284 mi (752.021 km)

Major junctions
- West end: I-70 / US 6 / US 50 at the Utah state line near Mack
- US 50 in Grand Junction; US 24 in Minturn; US 40 near Empire; SH 470 near Golden; I-25 / US 85 / US 87 / US 287 in Denver; I-270 in Commerce City; I-76 from Commerce City to Fort Morgan; US 34 in Fort Morgan; US 385 in Holyoke
- East end: US 6 at the Nebraska state line near Lamar, NE

Location
- Country: United States
- State: Colorado
- Counties: Mesa, Garfield, Eagle, Summit, Clear Creek, Jefferson, Denver, Adams, Weld, Morgan, Washington, Logan, Phillips

Highway system
- United States Numbered Highway System; List; Special; Divided; Colorado State Highway System; Interstate; US; State; Scenic
← SH 5	→ SH 7

U.S. Highway 6 (US 6) is a part of the United States Numbered Highway System that travels from Bishop, California, to Provincetown, Massachusetts. In the U.S. state of Colorado, US 6 is an east–west highway stretching from Utah to Nebraska. Much of the route overlaps other highways in Colorado, and, as a result, much of US 6 is unsigned.

== Route description ==
=== Western Slope ===
U.S. Highway 6 begins in Colorado at the Utah state line, concurrent with Interstate 70 as well as U.S. Highway 50. At Interstate 70 exit 11, U.S. Highway 6 & 50 end their concurrency with Interstate 70 and begin using the old highway alignment directly north of Interstate 70 while they travel through the communities of Mack, Loma, and Fruita. These communities were bypassed by Interstate 70. In Fruita routes 6 and 50 intersect State Highway 340, the gateway to the Colorado National Monument. The monument's sandstone canyons and rock spires are visible to the south from the highways. U.S. Highway 6 & 50 meet again with Interstate 70 at exit 26 where they begin a concurrent segment with Interstate 70 Business. The three routes travel southeast through downtown Grand Junction. U.S. Highway 6 ends its concurrency with U.S. Highway 50 and Interstate 70 Business with an interchange just west of North 1st Street. It continues east concurrent with North Avenue until rejoining Interstate 70 Business at Centennial Rd. They continue until rejoining Interstate 70 just west of the intersection of County Rd. 33 and County Rd. G. They then continue concurrently through Palisade and until just west of Rifle, where US6 continues parallel and north of the Colorado River. Eventually, it again rejoins I-70 at Chacra until separating once again at Glenwood Springs, rejoining at I-70 and 6th St. It separates from and runs parallel to I-70 at Dotsero, where the Eagle River joins the Colorado River. It again joins I-70 just east of Avon, the location of the Beaver Creek Resort, just a bit west of Vail. A significant departure from I-70 occurs at Silverthorne, where it veers a bit south and then north, avoiding the nearly two-mile-long (3.2 km) tunnel on I-70 as it goes under the Continental Divide. It passes Keystone Resort and Arapahoe Basin before a steep climb to the highest altitude along US 6, 11,990 feet (3,650 m), at Loveland Pass, where it crosses the Continental Divide.

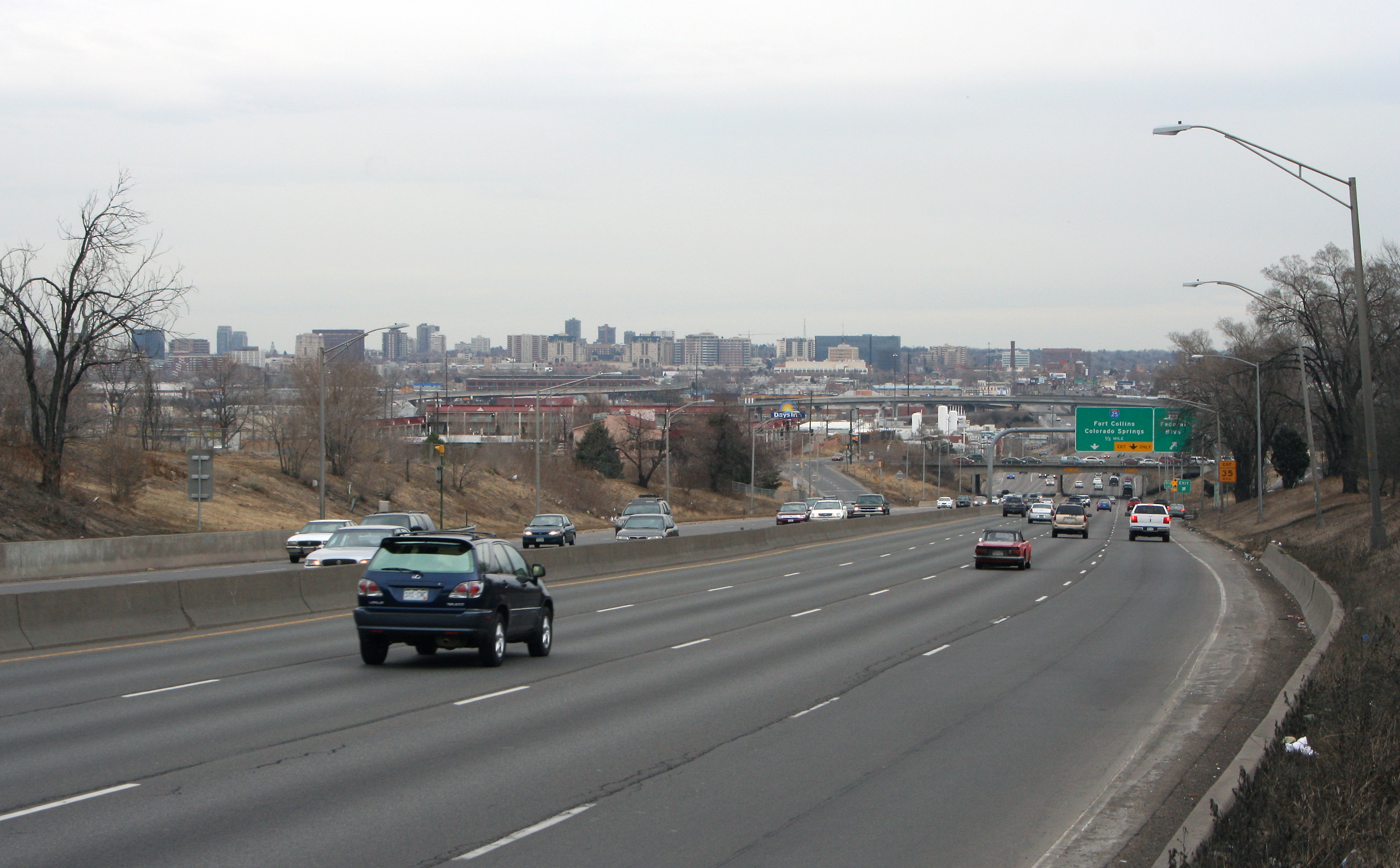
The 6th Avenue Freeway in Denver, looking east from Knox Court

=== Eastern Slope ===
Loveland Pass, where U.S. Highway 6 crosses the Continental Divide, drops down to rejoin I-70 as it comes out of the Eisenhower/Johnson tunnels at the Loveland Ski Area. Slightly east of Idaho Springs, it separates to go through the scenic Clear Creek Canyon. At Golden, it combines with 6th Avenue to head south until it again crosses paths with I-70. Then, continuing east, it passes through Lakewood.

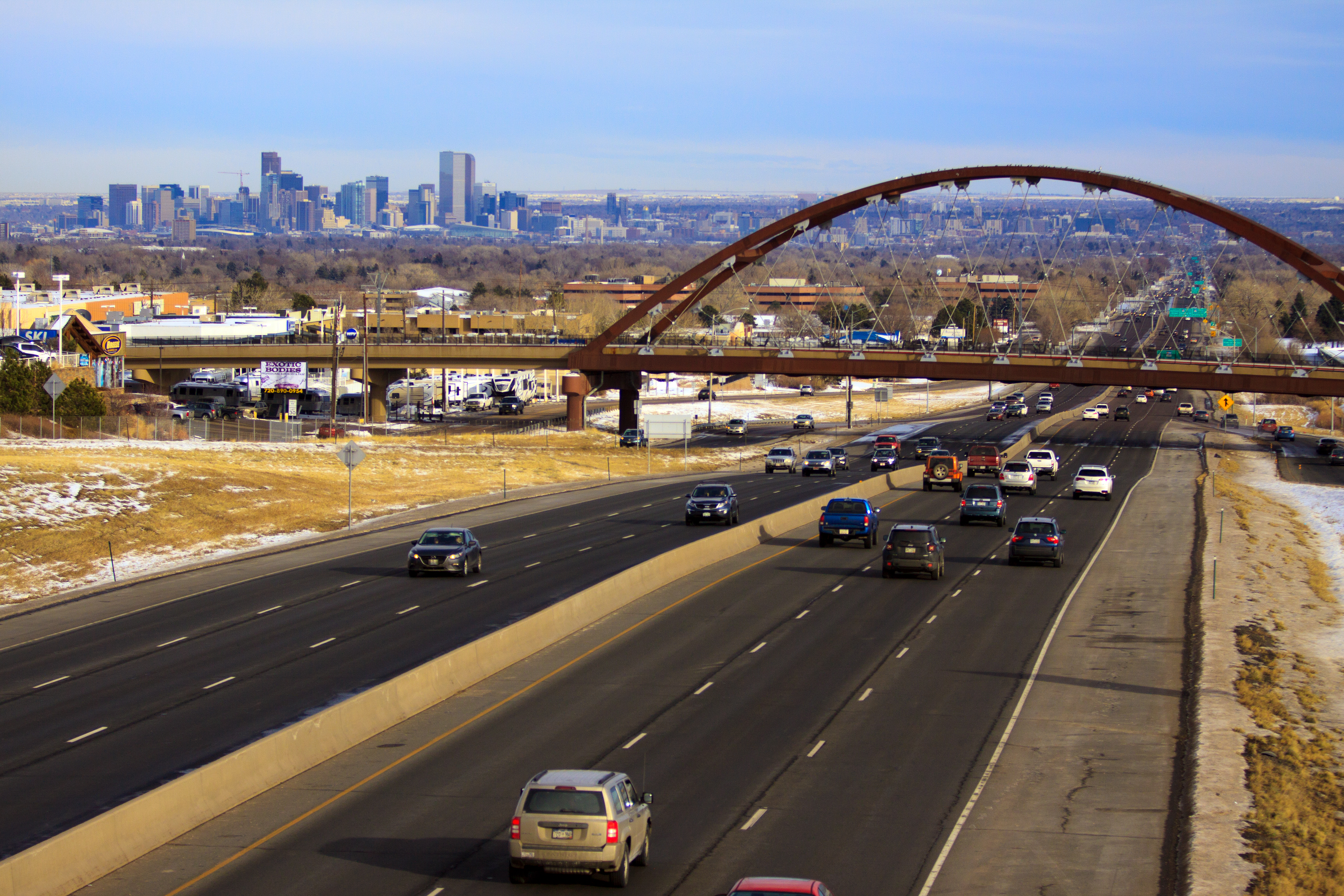
US 6 in Lakewood

US 6 westbound past SH 58 and SH 93 in Golden

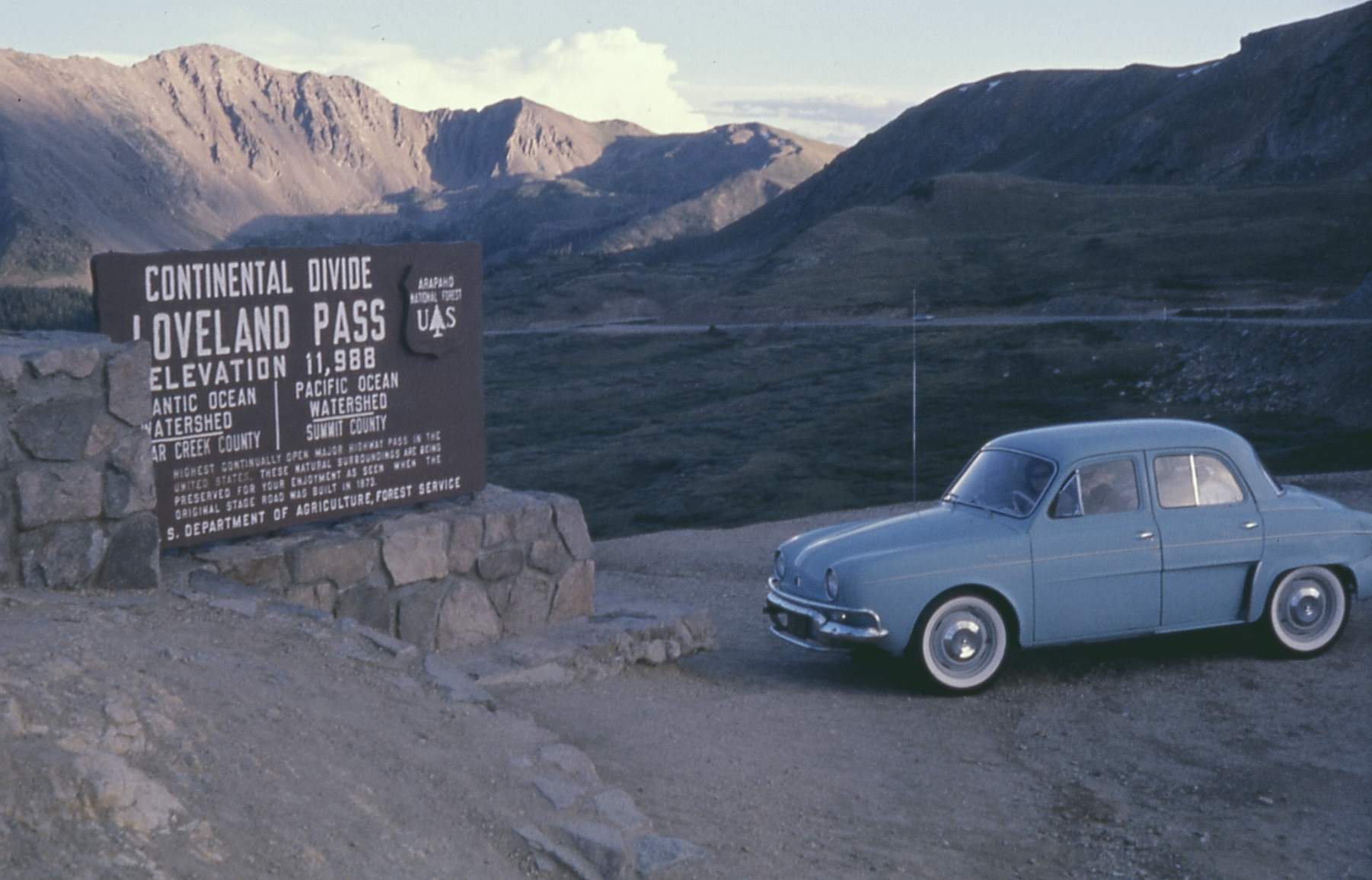
Loveland Pass in 1964

When the highway enters the western Denver suburbs, US-6 coincidentally aligns with 6th Avenue in the grid system, where it is known as 6th Avenue Freeway. Once it reaches I-25, US 6 travels north briefly, then follows I-76 for most of its length east of Denver. It is unsigned while it is overlapped. The highest altitude along US 6 is 11,990 feet (3,650 m) at Loveland Pass, where it crosses the Continental Divide. It continues down the Clear Creek valley until it reaches I-70, where it is briefly overlapped until I-70 leaves the Clear Creek valley. US 6 continues down Clear Creek and into Denver, where it turns into a freeway with six lanes. East of Denver, it continues east while joined with I-76 until it reaches Sterling, where it diverges from the Interstate. The last town in Colorado through which it passes is Holyoke.

== Major intersections ==
County	Location	mi	km	Exit	Destinations	Notes
Mesa		0.000	0.000		I-70 west (US 6 / US 50 west) – Salina	Continuation into Utah
Mesa		1.814	2.919	2	Rabbit Valley	Exit number follows I-70
Mesa	Mack	11.106	17.873		I-70 east	Eastern end of I-70 overlap; I-70 exit 11
Mesa	Loma	15.132	24.353		SH 139 to I-70 – Loma, Rangely	To I-70 via SH 139 south
Mesa	Fruita	19.955	32.114		SH 340 east (Coulson Street) to I-70	Western terminus of SH 340
Mesa	Grand Junction	26.080	41.972		I-70 BL begins / I-70 – Denver, Utah	Western end of I-70 BL overlap; I-70 exit 26; diverging diamond interchange
Mesa	Grand Junction	28.244	45.454		Patterson Road / 24 Road Redlands Parkway south	Partial interchange
Mesa	Grand Junction	30.447	49.000		I-70 BL / US 50 east – Montrose	Eastern end of I-70 BL/US 50 overlap; no westbound exit
Mesa	Grand Junction	34.859	56.100		I-70 BL west	Western end of I-70 BL overlap
Mesa	Clifton	37.267	59.975		SH 141 south	Northern terminus of SH 141
Mesa	Clifton	37.726	60.714		I-70 BL east to I-70 – Utah, Denver	Eastern end of I-70 BL overlap
Mesa		46.510 43.682	74.851 70.299		I-70 west	Western end of I-70 overlap; I-70 exit 44; westbound left exit and eastbound left entrance; mileposts change to reflect I-70 mileage
Mesa		45.332	72.955	46	Cameo	Exit numbers follow I-70
Mesa		46.867	75.425	47	James M. Robb – Colorado River State Park, Island Acres	Former port of entry
Mesa		49.015	78.882	49	SH 65 south to SH 330 east – Grand Mesa, Collbran	
Mesa		61.648 64.249	99.213 103.399		I-70 east	Eastern end of I-70 overlap; I-70 exit 62; mileposts change to reflect US 6 mileage
Garfield	Parachute	72.284– 72.688	116.330– 116.980		I-70 / Frontage Road	Dumbbell interchange; I-70 exit 72
Garfield	Rifle	88.895	143.063		I-70	I-70 exit 87
Garfield	Rifle	91.240	146.837		SH 13 north – Meeker, Craig	East end of state maintenance; west end of SH 13 overlap
Garfield	Rifle				SH 13 south to I-70	East end of SH 13 overlap; westbound access via Whiteriver Avenue
Garfield	Chacra	110.806 109.000	178.325 175.418		I-70 west	West end of state maintenance; western end of I-70 overlap; I-70 exit 109; mileposts change to reflect I-70 mileage
Garfield		111.328	179.165	111	South Canyon	Exit number follows I-70
Garfield	Glenwood Springs	114.295 116.898	183.940 188.129		I-70 east / Gilstrap Court / Midland Avenue / Mel Ray Road / Highway 6 west – Glenwood Springs Mall	Dumbbell interchange; east end of state maintenance; Highway 6 west is former US 6/ US 24 west; I-70 exit 114; mileposts change to reflect US 6 mileage
Garfield	Glenwood Springs	118.645	190.941		Devereaux Road	West end of state maintenance
Garfield	Glenwood Springs	118.983 116.380	191.485 187.295		SH 82 east (Grand Avenue) / I-70 west / E. 6th Street / Laurel Street – Aspen	Partial dumbbell interchange with I-70; western end of I-70 overlap; I-70 exit 116; western terminus of SH 82; mileposts change to reflect I-70 mileage
Garfield		118.640	190.933	119	No Name	Exit numbers follow I-70
Garfield		120.954	194.657	121	Grizzly Creek to Hanging Lake	Hanging Lake appears only on westbound signage
Garfield		122.660	197.402	123	Shoshone	Eastbound exit and westbound entrance
Garfield		125.061	201.266	125	Hanging Lake	Eastbound exit and westbound entrance
Garfield		125.269	201.601	Hanging Lake Tunnel		
Garfield		128.317	206.506	129	Bair Ranch Road	
Eagle		133.384– 134.053	214.661– 215.737	133	Dotsero	
Eagle	Gypsum	139.533 141.818	224.557 228.234		I-70 east – Denver	Eastern end of I-70 overlap; I-70 exit 140; mileposts change to reflect US 6 mileage
Eagle	Gypsum	141.993	228.516		Frontage Road / Trail Gulch Road	Roundabout; east end of state maintenance; Frontage Rd. is former US 6 west
Eagle	Eagle	149.718	240.948		Church Street / Eby Creek Road (I-70 BS north) to I-70	Roundabout; west end of state maintenance; southern terminus of I-70 BS
Eagle	Wolcott	159.500	256.690		SH 131 north – Steamboat Springs	Western end of SH 131 overlap
Eagle		159.889	257.316		SH 131 south to I-70	Eastern end of SH 131 overlap
Eagle	Eagle-Vail	172.185	277.105		I-70 east	I-70 east exit 169; no access to I-70 west
Eagle		174.541 171.105	280.897 275.367		I-70 west – Aspen US 24 east – Minturn, Leadville	Western end of I-70 overlap; I-70 exit 171; western terminus of US 24; mileposts change to reflect I-70 mileage
Eagle	Vail	173.319	278.930	173	West Vail	Exit numbers follow I-70
Eagle	Vail	176.057	283.336	176	Vail Ski Area – Vail Museum	
Eagle	Vail	179.866	289.466	180	East Vail	
Vail Pass		189.981	305.745	Elevation 10,662 feet (3,250 m)		
Summit		190.095	305.928	190	Shrine Pass Road – Vail Pass rest area	
Summit		195.298	314.302	195	SH 91 south – Copper Mountain, Leadville	Northern terminus of SH 91
Summit		197.854	318.415	198	Officers Gulch	
Summit	Frisco	200.995	323.470	201	Main Street	
Summit	Frisco	202.352	325.654	203	SH 9 south – Frisco, Breckenridge	Western end of SH 9 overlap
Summit	Silverthorne	205.423 208.659	330.596 335.804		SH 9 north (Blue River Parkway) / I-70 east – Silverthorne	Eastern end of I-70/SH 9 overlap; I-70 exit 205; mileposts change to reflect US 6 mileage
Loveland Pass		225.552	362.991	Elevation 11,990 feet (3,650 m)		
Clear Creek		229.896 216.185	369.982 347.916		I-70 west – Grand Junction	Western end of I-70 overlap; mileposts change to reflect I-70 mileage
Clear Creek		218.346	351.394	218	Herman Gulch Road	Exit numbers follow I-70
Clear Creek		221.297	356.143	221	Bakerville	
Clear Creek	Silver Plume	225.719	363.260	226	Silver Plume	
Clear Creek	Georgetown	227.910	366.786	228	Georgetown	
Clear Creek		231.889	373.189	232	US 40 west – Empire, Granby	Western end of US 40 overlap
Clear Creek		223.047	358.959	223	Lawson	Eastbound exit only
Clear Creek		234.209	376.923	234	Downieville, Lawson	
Clear Creek		235.005	378.204	235	Dumont	Westbound exit and eastbound entrance
Clear Creek		237.680	382.509	238	Fall River Road	
Clear Creek	Idaho Springs	238.885	384.448	239	I-70 BL east – Idaho Springs	
Clear Creek	Idaho Springs	239.652	385.683	240	SH 103 south / Mount Blue Sky Scenic Byway – Mount Blue Sky	Northern terminus of SH 103
Clear Creek	Idaho Springs	241.125	388.053	241	I-70 BL west / County Road 314	
Clear Creek		242.980	391.038	243	Hidden Valley, Central City	
Clear Creek		244.260 257.079	393.098 413.729		I-70 – Denver	Interchange; eastern end of I-70 overlap; I-70 exit 244; no ramp to I-70 east.; mileposts change to reflect US 6 mileage
Clear Creek		257.296	414.078		US 40 east to I-70 east	Eastern end of US 40 overlap
Clear Creek		257.751	414.810		SH 119 north – Black Hawk, Central City	Southern terminus of SH 119
Jefferson	Golden	271.600	437.098		SH 58 east / SH 93 north – Golden, Boulder	Western terminus of SH 58
Jefferson	Golden				19th Street / Lookout Mountain Road	Interchange
Jefferson	Golden	273.397	439.990		SH 470 east – Colorado Springs	SH 470 exits 0A-B northbound
Jefferson	Golden	275.120	442.763		US 40 (Colfax Avenue)	
Jefferson	Golden	276.003	444.184	—	I-70 west – Grand Junction	West end of 6th Avenue freeway; westbound exit and eastbound entrance; I-70 exit 261 eastbound
Jefferson	Lakewood	276.998	445.785	—	Indiana Street / Denver West Colorado Mills Boulevard	
Jefferson	Lakewood	277.002	445.792	—	Union Boulevard / Simms Street	
Jefferson	Lakewood	277.310	446.287	—	SH 391 (Kipling Street)	
Jefferson	Lakewood	278.795	448.677	—	Garrison Street	
Jefferson	Lakewood	280.830	451.952	—	SH 121 (Wadsworth Blvd)	
Jefferson	Lakewood	281.984	453.809	—	SH 95 (Sheridan Blvd)	
Jefferson	Lakewood	282.330	454.366	—	Lowell Boulevard / Perry Street	Westbound exit and eastbound entrance
City and County of Denver		283.86	456.83	—	SH 88 (Federal Blvd) / Bryant Street	Bryant Street not signed westbound
City and County of Denver		284.470 209.210	457.810 336.691	—	6th Avenue east	No westbound exit; I-25 exit 209A; 6th Avenue freeway continues east
City and County of Denver		284.470 209.210	457.810 336.691	—	I-25 south (US 85 / US 87 south) – Colorado Springs	West end of I-25/US 85/US 87 overlap; I-25 exit 209B; mileposts change to reflect I-25 mileage
City and County of Denver		209.479	337.124	209C	8th Avenue	Exit numbers follow I-25
City and County of Denver		210.310	338.461	210A	US 40 / US 287 (Colfax Avenue) – Downtown Denver	
City and County of Denver		210.415	338.630	210B	Auraria Parkway	Eastbound exit and westbound entrance
City and County of Denver		210.532	338.818	210C	17th Avenue	Eastbound exit and entrance; westbound access is via exit 211
City and County of Denver		211.109	339.747	211	23rd Avenue / 20th Avenue	20th Ave. not signed eastbound
City and County of Denver		211.464	340.318	212A-B	Speer Boulevard – Downtown Denver	Signed as exits 212A (south) and 212B (north)
City and County of Denver		212.096	341.335	212C	20th Street	
City and County of Denver				—	I-25 HOV/toll lanes	South end of I-25 reversible HOV/toll lanes; eastbound exit and westbound entrance
City and County of Denver		212.769	342.419	213	Park Avenue / W. 38th Avenue	
City and County of Denver		213.625 274.062	343.796 441.060	—	I-25 north (US 87 north) – Thornton, Ft. Collins	East end of I-25/US 87 overlap; I-25 exit 214A
City and County of Denver		213.625 274.062	343.796 441.060	—	I-70 west – Grand Junction	Western end of I-70 overlap; I-70 exit 274; mileposts change to reflect I-70 mileage
City and County of Denver		274.607	441.937	275A	Washington Street	No exit number eastbound; exit numbers follow I-70
City and County of Denver		275.252	442.975	275B	SH 265 north (Brighton Boulevard)	
City and County of Denver		275.545	443.447	275C	York Street / Josephine Street	Eastbound exit and westbound entrance
City and County of Denver		276.080 290.98	444.308 468.29		I-70 east	Eastern end of I-70 overlap; I-70 exit 276A; mileposts change to reflect US 6 mileage
Adams	Commerce City	292.145	470.162		SH 2 south (Colorado Blvd) to I-70 east	Interchange; western end of SH 2 overlap; westbound exit and eastbound entrance
Adams	Commerce City	292.743	471.124		I-270 (US 36) – Boulder, Limon	Partial cloverleaf interchange; no eastbound exit to I-270 east; I-270 exits 2A-B
Adams	Commerce City	293.42	472.21		SH 2 east (Old)	Interchange; no westbound exit; eastern end of SH 2 overlap; no CDOT maintenance on this stretch of SH 2
Adams	Commerce City	293.763	472.766		Mill Road	Interchange
Adams	Commerce City	294.235– 294.651	473.525– 474.195		SH 265 south	
Adams	Commerce City	295.000	474.756		SH 224 west (74th Avenue) to I-76 west	
Adams		296.32 9.483	476.88 15.261		I-76 west – Arvada	Interchange; western end of I-76 overlap; westbound left exit and eastbound left entrance; I-76 exit 9; mileposts change to reflect I-76 mileage
Adams		10.466	16.843	10	88th Avenue	Exit numbers follow I-76
Adams		11.549	18.586	11	96th Avenue	
Adams		12.502	20.120	12	US 85 north – Greeley, Brighton	Eastern end of US 85 overlap; no eastbound entrance
Adams	Brighton	16.477	26.517	16	SH 2 south (Sable Boulevard) / 120th Avenue – Denver International Airport	
Adams	Brighton	18.079	29.095	18	E-470 south to I-70 east – Limon, Denver International Airport	Westbound exit and eastbound entrance; E-470 exit 35
Adams	Brighton	19.723	31.741	20	136th Avenue	
Adams	Brighton	21.081	33.927	21	Eagle Boulevard	
Adams	Brighton	22.407	36.061	22	Bromley Lane	
Adams–Weld county line	Lochbuie	25.145	40.467	25	SH 7 west – Lochbuie, Brighton	
Weld	Hudson	31.480	50.662	31	SH 52 – Hudson, Fort Lupton	
Weld	Hudson	34.412	55.381	34	Kersey Road	
Weld		38.925	62.644	39	Keenesburg ( I-76 BS)	
Weld		47.972	77.203	48	Roggen	
Weld		49.236	79.238	49	Painter Road	Westbound exit and eastbound entrance
Weld		57.219	92.085	57	County Road 91	
Weld		59.799	96.237	60	SH 144 east – Orchard	
Morgan		63.883 343.519	102.810 552.840		I-76 east	Eastern end of I-76 overlap; no westbound access to I-76 east; I-76 exit 64; mileposts change to reflect US 6 mileage
Morgan		345.928	556.717		SH 52 west / SH 39 north to I-76 west – Goodrich, Hoyt	Western end of SH 52 overlap; southern terminus of SH 39
Morgan		346.425 66.288	557.517 106.680	66B	I-76 west US 34 west – Greeley, Estes Park	Exit number is for US 34; exit numbers follow I-76; western end of I-76/US 34 overlap; I-76 exit 66A; mileposts change to reflect I-76 mileage
Morgan		73.130	117.691	73	Long Bridge Road	
Morgan		75.280	121.151	75	I-76 BL / US 34 east (SH 52 east) – Fort Morgan	Eastern end of US 34/SH 52 overlap; western terminus of I-76 BL
Morgan		78.852	126.900	79	SH 144 – Weldona	
Morgan	Fort Morgan	80.139	128.971	80	SH 52 – Raymer, Fort Morgan	
Morgan	Fort Morgan	81.648	131.400	82	Barlow Road – Fort Morgan	
Morgan		85.713	137.942	86	Dodd Bridge Road	
Morgan		88.695	142.741	89	Hospital Road	
Morgan	Brush	89.643	144.266	90	SH 71 to US 34 (I-76 BL) – Brush, Akron, Limon, Snyder	
Morgan		91.693 371.69	147.566 598.18		I-76 east / I-76 BL west (US 34 Spur south) to US 34 / SH 71 – Brush	Eastern end of I-76 overlap; western end of I-76 BL overlap; I-76 exit 92; mileposts change to reflect US 6 mileage; US 34 Spur unsigned
Washington		383.254	616.788		County Road Q to I-76	
Logan	Atwood	397.955	640.446		SH 63 south – Akron	Northern terminus of SH 63
Logan	Sterling	404.644	651.211		US 138 east (3rd Street north) / SH 14 west (Chestnut Street west) – Julesburg, Fort Collins	SH 14 is former US 6 west; western terminus of SH 138; eastern terminus of SH 14
Logan	Sterling	404.734	651.356		Front Street	Interchange; no westbound entrance
Logan	Sterling	406.568	654.308		I-76 BL ends / I-76 – Fort Morgan, Julesburg	Eastern terminus of I-76 BL; eastern end of I-76 BL overlap; I-76 exit 125
Logan		406.794	654.671		SH 61 south – Otis	Northern terminus of SH 61
Logan	Fleming	424.964	683.913		SH 55 north (Logan Avenue)	Southern terminus of SH 55
Phillips	Haxtun	436.496	702.472		SH 59 – Yuma, Sedgwick	
Phillips	Holyoke	454.06	730.74		US 385 (Interocean Avenue)	
Phillips		467.284	752.021		US 6 east – Imperial	Continuation into Nebraska
1.000 mi = 1.609 km; 1.000 km = 0.621 mi: Concurrency terminus; Electronic toll collection; HOV only; Incomplete access

U.S. Route 6
Previous state: Utah	Colorado	Next state: Nebraska
