= U.S. Route 34 in Colorado =

Highway in Colorado

U.S. Highway 34
- US 34 highlighted in red

Route information
- Maintained by CDOT
- Length: 259.529 mi (417.671 km)
- Existed: 1972–present

Major junctions
- West end: US 40 in Granby
- US 36 in Estes Park; US 287 in Loveland; I-25 / US 87 near Loveland; US 85 in Greeley; I-76 / US 6 in Fort Morgan; US 385 in Wray
- East end: US 34 near Laird

Location
- Country: United States
- State: Colorado
- Counties: Grand, Larimer, Weld, Morgan, Washington, Yuma

Highway system
- United States Numbered Highway System; List; Special; Divided; Colorado State Highway System; Interstate; US; State; Scenic
← SH 30	→ SH 35

U.S. Route 34 (US 34) is a part of the U.S. Highway System that travels from Granby, Colorado, to Berwyn, Illinois. In the U.S. state of Colorado, US 34 is a 260-mile-long (420 km) road that spans across northern Colorado. It begins at US 40 in Granby and ends at the Nebraska border, where it continues as US 34, east of Laird.

== Route description ==
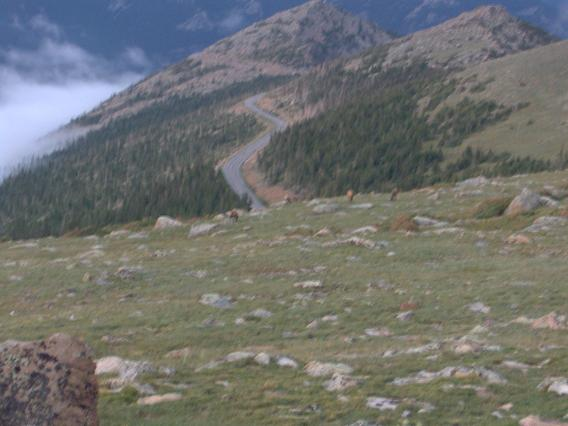
View of US 34 in Rocky Mountain National Park, at an altitude above 11,000 feet

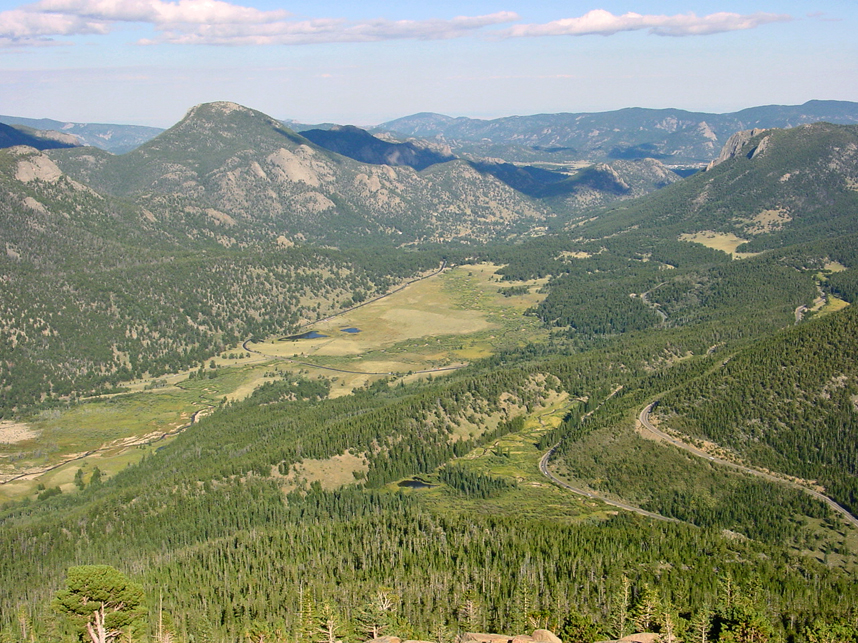
View of US 34 in Rocky Mountain National Park, at Rainbow Curve

=== Granby to Rocky Mountain National Park ===
The route begins in Granby at US 40. It then follows the Colorado River Valley near Lake Granby and enters Arapaho National Recreation Area.

=== Trail Ridge Road ===
After entering Rocky Mountain National Park in Colorado's Front Range, US 34 follows the North Fork Colorado River through Kawuneeche Valley. It passes over Milner Pass and reaches the Alpine Visitor Center. Then it continues east, passing its highest point at 12,183 feet near Fall River Pass. It exits the park at US 36 at Deer Ridge Junction.

US 34 here is the highest continuous highway in the United States.

This section of US 34 requires a $30 national park entrance fee, making this segment into a toll road.

=== Estes Park to Loveland ===
From here, it passes by Estes Park, has a business route, and then continues east through Big Thompson Canyon before entering Loveland as Eisenhower Boulevard, becoming a four-lane expressway. Here, it intersects I-25 and U.S. Highway 287.

=== Greeley to Nebraska border ===
At Greeley, it passes by U.S. Highway 85 in a complex interchange and U.S. 34 Business, and crosses the South Platte River. It also has an interchange with SH 257. From here, it is no longer an expressway. It intersects SH 144 and SH 39, then joins I-76 at Wiggins. It leaves, and follows the North Fork Republican River east into Nebraska, where it intersects SH 71, SH 52, SH 63, SH 61, SH 59, and U.S. Highway 385.

== History ==
Parts of the route were originally designated as US 38. US 34 was extended into Colorado in 1939.

== Major intersections ==
County	Location	mi	km	Destinations	Notes
Grand	Granby	0.000	0.000	US 40 – Granby, Denver, Hot Sulphur Springs, Steamboat Springs	West end of route
Grand	Grand Lake	14.683	23.630	West Portal Road – Grand Lake and Village	former SH 278
Grand	Rocky Mountain National Park	16.3	26.2	Grand Lake Entrance Station; Rocky Mountain National Park entrance fee required	
Grand	Rocky Mountain National Park	25.7	41.4	Colorado River Trailhead; Eastbound road closure gate (closed winters)	
Larimer	Rocky Mountain National Park	49.4	79.5	Many Parks Curve; Westbound road closure gate (closed winters)	
Larimer	Rocky Mountain National Park	53.758	86.515	US 36 east – Moraine Park, Bear Lake, Estes Park	
Larimer	Rocky Mountain National Park	55.546	89.393	Old Fall River Road – Endovalley	
Larimer	Rocky Mountain National Park	57.686	92.837	Fall River Entrance Station; Rocky Mountain National Park entrance fee required	
Larimer	Estes Park	60.965	98.114	US 34 Bus. east (Elkhorn Avenue)	
Larimer	Estes Park	62.081	99.910	MacGregor Avenue – Devils Gulch, Glen Haven	former SH 262
Larimer	Estes Park	62.507	100.595	US 36 / US 34 Bus. west (Elkhorn Avenue / St. Vrain Avenue) to SH 7 – Lyons	
Larimer	Drake	75.584	121.641	CR 43 – Glen Haven	former SH 262
Larimer		85.617	137.787	CR 27 – Masonville	former SH 186
Larimer	Loveland	91.924	147.937	US 287 south (Cleveland Avenue) – Longmont, Central Business District	
Larimer	Loveland	92.009	148.074	US 287 north (Lincoln Avenue) – Fort Collins	
Larimer	Loveland	96.250	154.899	I-25 (US 87) – Denver, Fort Collins	
Weld	Greeley	102.476	164.919	US 34 Bus. east (10th Street) – Greeley	Eastbound exit and westbound entrance
Weld	Greeley	102.804	165.447	SH 257 – Windsor, Milliken	
Weld	Greeley	111.233	179.012	23rd Avenue / 27th Street	
Weld	Greeley	112.772	181.489	US 85 south / US 85 Bus. north (8th Avenue) – Denver, Greeley	West end of US 85 overlap
Weld	Greeley	113.136	182.075	US 85 north – Cheyenne	East end of US 85 overlap
Weld		115.411	185.736	US 34 Bus. west	
Weld		117.251	188.697	CR 49 – Hudson, Keenesburg	former SH 37 south
Weld	Kersey	119.178	191.798	CR 53 / 1st Street – Kersey	former SH 37 north
Morgan		144.470	232.502	SH 144 – Orchard, Jackson Lake State Park	
Morgan		149.164	240.056	SH 39 / SH 52 – Goodrich, Wiggins	
Morgan		149.345 66.288	240.347 106.680	I-76 west (US 6 west) – Denver	Westbound exit and eastbound entrance; western end of I-76 overlap
Morgan		73.130	117.691	Long Bridge Road	I-76 exit 73; former SH 144
Morgan		75.704 158.794	121.834 255.554	I-76 east (US 6 east) – Fort Morgan, Sterling	Eastern end of I-76 overlap
Morgan	Fort Morgan	162.962	262.262	SH 52 north (Main Street) to I-76	
Morgan	Brush	172.414	277.473	SH 71 north (Colorado Avenue) to I-76	West end of SH 71 overlap
Morgan		173.570	279.334	SH 71 south – Last Chance, Limon	East end of SH 71 overlap
Morgan		173.852	279.788	To US 6 / I-76 – Sterling	
Washington	Akron	196.336	315.972	SH 63 (Cedar Avenue) – Sterling, Anton	
Washington	Otis	209.305	336.844	SH 61 north (Dade Street) – Sterling	
Yuma	Yuma	223.345	359.439	SH 59 (Detroit Street) – Haxtun	
Yuma	Wray	249.931	402.225	US 385 (Dexter Street) – Holyoke	
Yuma		259.529	417.671	US 34 east – Haigler, McCook	Nebraska state line
1.000 mi = 1.609 km; 1.000 km = 0.621 mi: Closed/former; Concurrency terminus; Incomplete access; Tolled

U.S. Route 34
Previous state: Terminus	Colorado	Next state: Nebraska
