= Colorado State Highway 52 =

Highway in Colorado

State Highway 52
- SH 52 highlighted in red

Route information
- Maintained by CDOT
- Length: 111.009 mi (178.652 km)

Major junctions
- West end: SH 119 near Niwot
- US 287 in rural Boulder County; I-25 near Dacono; US 85 in Fort Lupton; I-76 / US 6 in Hudson; US 34 in Wiggins
- East end: SH 14 in Raymer

Location
- Country: United States
- State: Colorado
- Counties: Boulder, Weld, Morgan

Highway system
- Colorado State Highway System; Interstate; US; State; Scenic
← US 50	→ SH 53

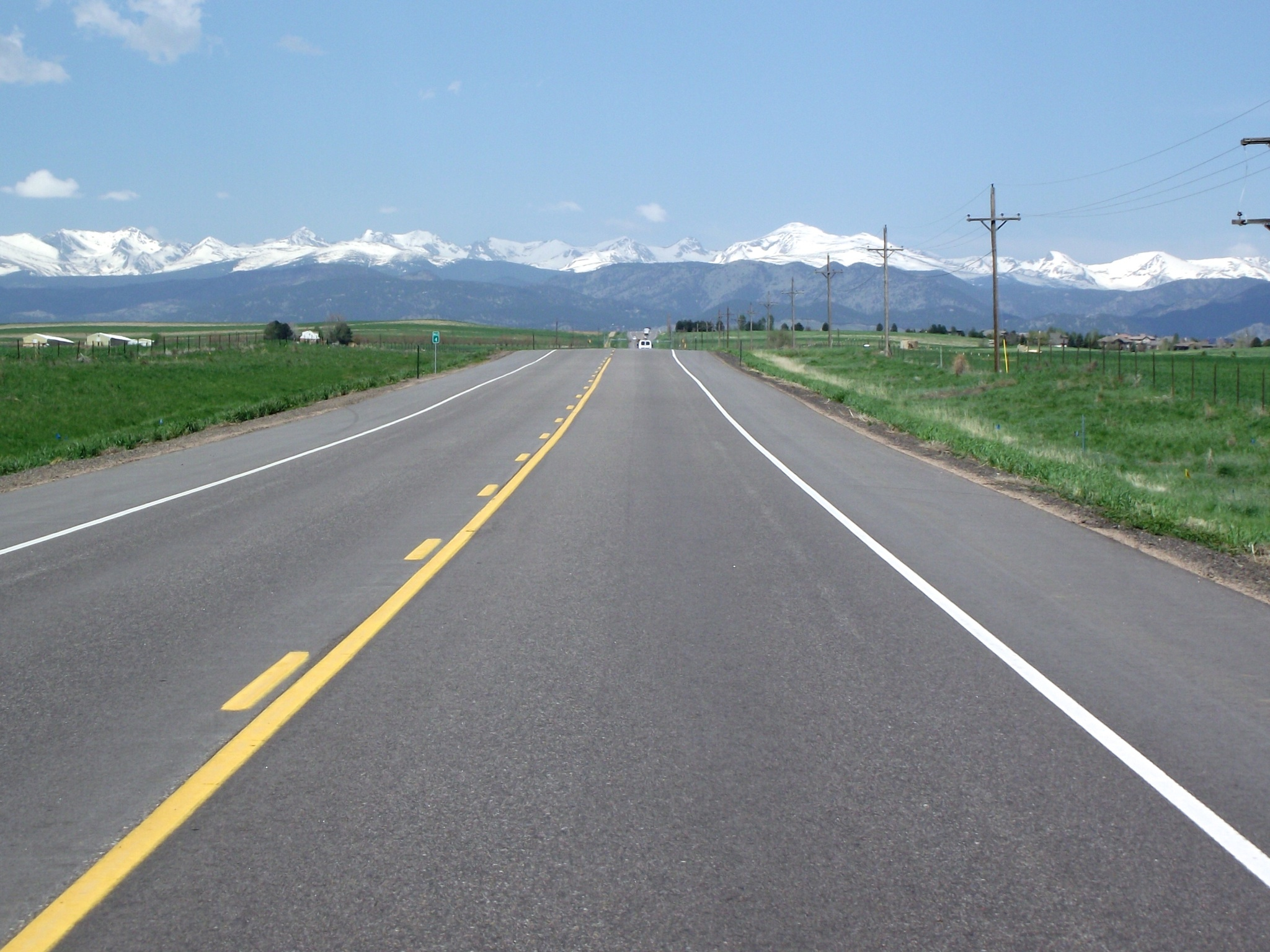
Snowcapped peaks of the Continental divide as seen from SH 52

State Highway 52 (SH 52) is a 111 mi (178.6 km) long state highway in northeastern Colorado. The western terminus is at SH 119 near Niwot, and the eastern terminus is at SH 14 in Raymer.

== Route description ==
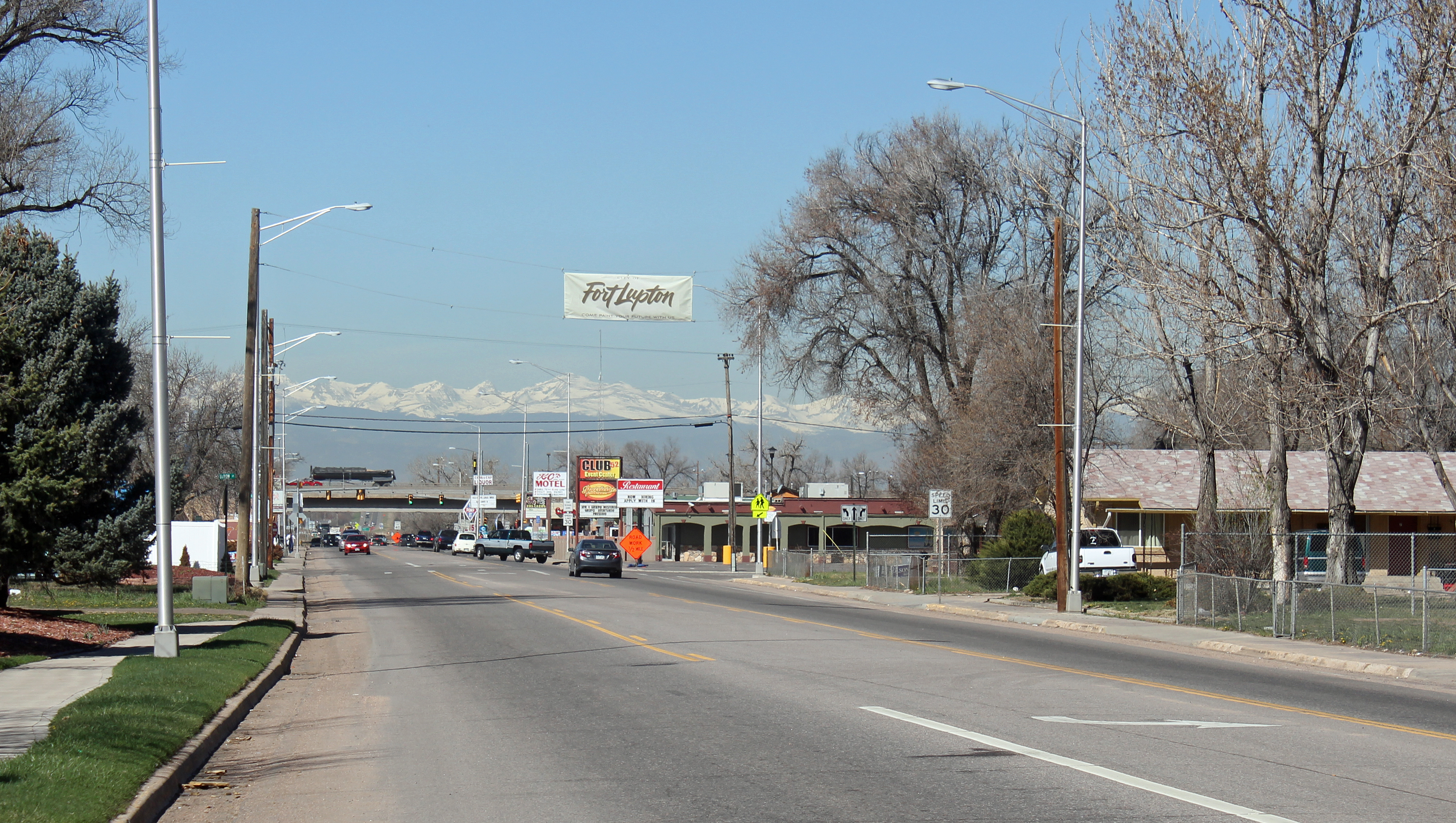
SH 52 looking west towards US 85 in Fort Lupton

SH 52 begins near Niwot, running east from its western terminus past US 287 to a diamond interchange with I-25, near the towns of Dacono, Frederick, and Firestone. The highway continues east through interchanges with US 85 in Fort Lupton and I-76 in Hudson. Farther east, the route bends north about 12 miles (19 km) south of Wiggins where it begins its concurrency with I-76, US 6, and US 34 eastward to Fort Morgan where it again turns north and traverses to Raymer, where it ends at SH 14.

== Major intersections ==
County	Location	mi	km	Destinations	Notes
Boulder		0	0.0	SH 119 – Longmont, Boulder	Western terminus
Boulder		4.5	7.2	US 287 – Fort Collins, Denver	
Weld		11	18	I-25 / US 87 – Fort Collins, Denver	Interchange; I-25 exit 235
Weld	Fort Lupton	20	32	US 85 – Greeley, Brighton	Interchange
Weld	Hudson	29	47	I-76 / US 6 – Denver, Fort Morgan	Interchange, I-76 exit 31
Weld		41.5	66.8	SH 79 south – Bennett	Northern terminus of SH 79
Morgan		72.5	116.7	I-76 / US 34 / US 6 east / SH 39 north – Fort Morgan	West end of I-76/US 34/US 6 overlap; I-76 exit 66; southern terminus of SH 39
Morgan		82	132	I-76 / US 6 east – Sterling	East end of I-76/US 6 overlap; West end of I-76 Bus. overlap; Interchange; I-76 exit 75
Morgan	Fort Morgan	86	138	US 34 east (Platte Avenue) – Akron	East end of US 34/I-76 Bus. overlap
Morgan	Fort Morgan	86.5	139.2	SH 144 west (Riverview Avenue) – Log Lane Village	Eastern terminus of SH 144
Morgan	Fort Morgan	87	140	I-76 / US 6 – Denver, Sterling	Interchange; I-76 exit 80
Weld	Raymer	111	179	SH 14 – Ault, Sterling	Eastern terminus
1.000 mi = 1.609 km; 1.000 km = 0.621 mi: Concurrency terminus
