= Colorado State Highway 39 =

Highway in Colorado

State Highway 39
- SH 39 highlighted in red

Route information
- Maintained by CDOT
- Length: 7.571 mi (12.184 km)

Major junctions
- South end: I-76 / SH 52 near Wiggins
- US 34 near Wiggins
- North end: SH 144 near Jackson Lake State Park

Location
- Country: United States
- State: Colorado
- Counties: Morgan

Highway system
- Colorado State Highway System; Interstate; US; State; Scenic
← SH 36	→ US 40

State Highway 39 (SH 39) is a 7.571 mi (12.2 km) long state highway in northeast Colorado. The southern terminus is at Interstate 76 (I-76) and SH 52 near Wiggins, and the northern terminus at SH 144 near Jackson Lake State Park.

== Route description ==
SH 39 runs 7.6 miles (12.2 km), starting at a junction with I-76 near Wiggins, going north across the South Platte River and ending at a junction with SH 144 near Jackson Lake State Park.

== Major intersections ==
The entire route is in Morgan County.

Location	mi	km	Destinations	Notes
	0.000	0.000	I-76 / SH 52 – Denver	Southern terminus; I-76 exit 66A
	0.328	0.528	US 34 west – Greeley	
	7.571	12.184	SH 144 – Weldona, Fort Morgan, Orchard	Northern terminus
1.000 mi = 1.609 km; 1.000 km = 0.621 mi
