= Interstate 76 (Colorado–Nebraska) =

Interstate Highway in the United States

Interstate 76
- I-76 highlighted in red

Route information
- Length: 187.29 mi (301.41 km)
- Existed: 1975–present
- NHS: Entire route

Major junctions
- West end: I-70 in Arvada, CO
- US 287 in Arvada, CO; I-25 / US 87 in North Washington, CO; I-270 / US 36 in North Washington, CO; US 6 / US 85 in Commerce City, CO; US 85 in Commerce City, CO; E-470 in Brighton, CO; US 34 near Fort Morgan, CO; US 6 near Brush, CO; US 6 near Sterling, CO; US 385 near Julesburg, CO
- East end: I-80 near Big Springs, NE

Location
- Country: United States
- States: Colorado, Nebraska
- Counties: CO: Jefferson, Denver, Adams, Weld, Morgan, Washington, Logan, Sedgwick; NE: Deuel

Highway system
- Interstate Highway System; Main; Auxiliary; Suffixed; Business; Future
← SH 75	CO	→ SH 78
← US 75	NE	→ US 77

Interstate 76 (I-76) is an east–west Interstate Highway in the Western United States that runs from I-70 in Arvada, Colorado – near Denver – to an interchange with I-80 near Big Springs, Nebraska. The highway measures 187.29 miles (301.41 km) long, mostly situated in Colorado but approximately three miles (4.8 km) of which is in Nebraska. Along the route, the highway runs concurrent with US 6, US 85 in the Denver metropolitan area, and US 34 from Wiggins to Fort Morgan. It has no auxiliary Interstates, but it has two business routes that are located in northeastern Colorado. This route is not connected with the other I-76 that spans from Ohio to New Jersey.

The section of I-76 from its western terminus at I-70 to the SH 71 interchange near Brush, Colorado is designated as part of the Heartland Expressway, a planned series of multi-lane highways connecting Denver and Rapid City, South Dakota.

== Route description ==
Lengths
	mi	km
CO	184.14	296.34
NE	3.15	5.07
Total	187.29	301.41

=== Colorado ===
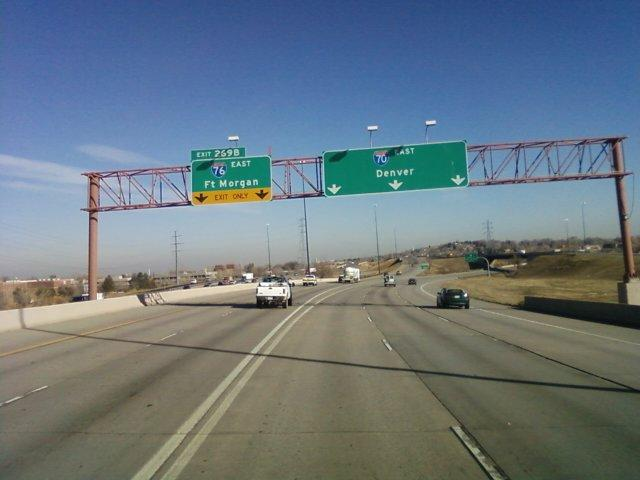
I-70 at its interchange with I-76

I-76 begins at an interchange with I-70 in Arvada. From I-70, the freeway heads east to an exit at State Highway 95 (SH 95), known as Sheridan Boulevard. The route heads northeastward across US 287, known as Federal Boulevard, to an interchange with I-25. Running roughly parallel to nearby Clear Creek, I-76 meets another interchange, with I-270 in North Washington, Colorado, where Clear Creek joins the South Platte River, which is crossed by I-76. After an interchange at SH 224, I-76 joins US 85 and US 6 at Brighton Boulevard. Past Derby, US 85 veers away from I-76 after 96th Avenue. The combined routes of US 6 and I-76 head northeastward, crossing SH 2 south, named Sable Boulevard, before meeting an exit at E-470, a toll road. Past E-470, the freeway exits the Denver metropolitan area.

Passing just west of Barr Lake, the freeway heads northeastward east of Brighton. Near Lochbuie, the freeway crosses SH 7, before crossing into Weld County. I-76 meets SH 52 in Hudson, the next city along the freeway. Past Hudson, the combined routes of US 6 and I-76 turn slightly eastward into Keenesburg, which is served by a business loop (I-76 Business [I-76 Bus]). I-76 then turns northeast and east into Roggen, where it meets County Road 73. The highway heads away from the farmland it was formerly running through and traverses a large grassland area. Just south of the Empire Reservoir, the freeway turns back east, crossing into Morgan County within circular fields. Heading east, I-76 heads into Wiggins, near which I-76 joins US 34. The three combined routes head east through farms.

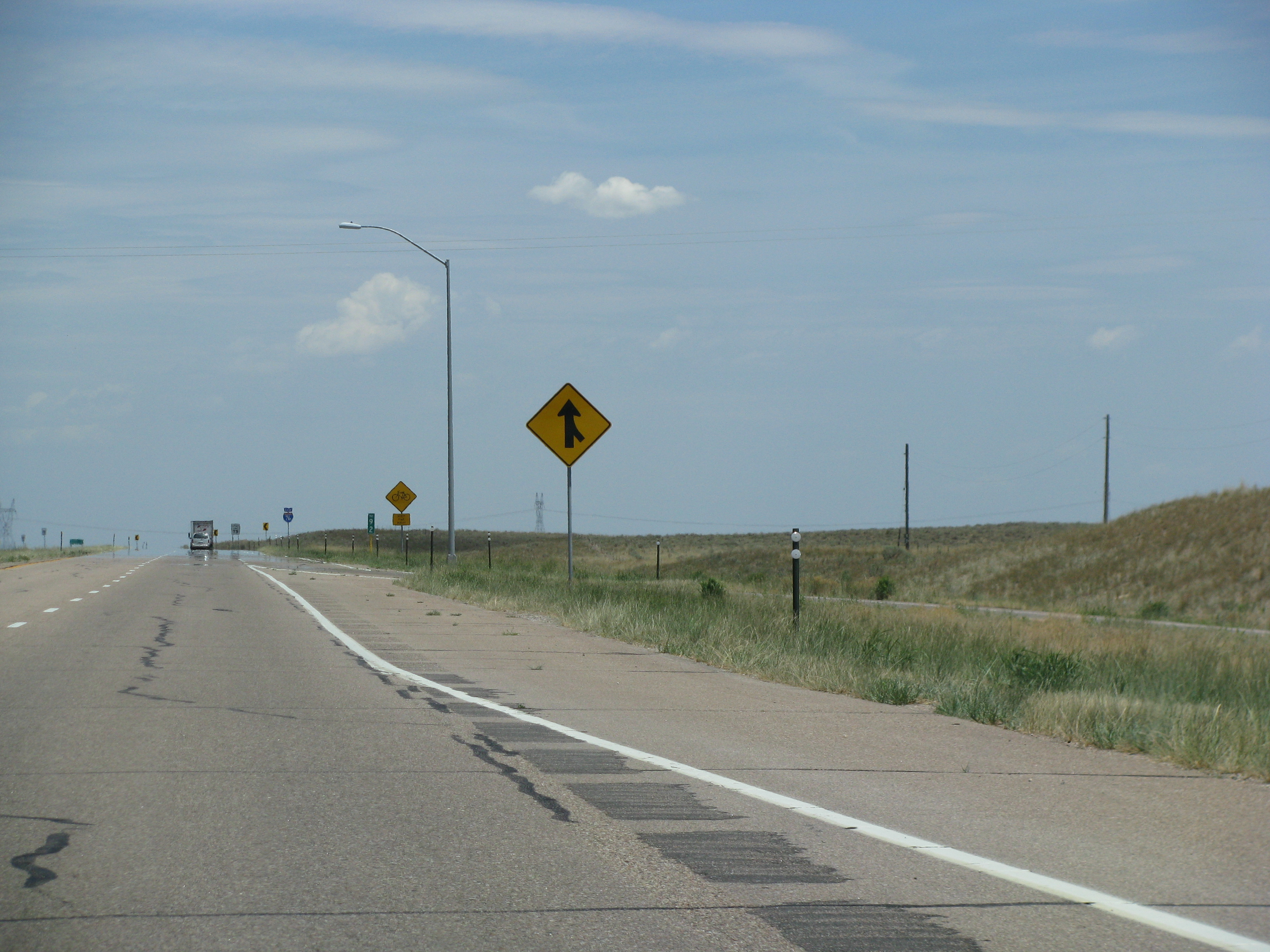
I-76 near Brush

The freeway heads east toward Fort Morgan, spawning another business loop (I-76 Bus) that carries US 34 away from I-76. The freeway heads east into Fort Morgan, meeting SH 52, now running again near the South Platte River. Still running between the South Platte River to the north and its business loop to the south, I-76 heads just north of Brush, where it meets an interchange with SH 71. US 34 veers away from the business loop as I-76 turns back east, crossing over the business loop, which does not terminate at the freeway. I-76 Bus carries US 6 toward Hillrose. Bypassing that city, I-76 traverses northeast into Washington County, with farms to the north along the river and grasslands to the south. Passing the Prewitt Reservoir, the freeway heads into Logan County. Heading northeasterly, the route crosses SH 63, which serves Atwood. I-76 Bus then enters Sterling, which is near I-76. The business loops turns abruptly east within the city, carrying US 6. US 6 continues past the interchange with the business route.

I-76 continues parallel to the South Platte River, surrounded by farms to the northwest and plains to the southeast. Northwest of the river is US 138, which serves several towns bypassed by the freeway. I-76 has an exit at SH 55 which serves the town of Crook. With farms on the south part of the freeway as well, I-76 enters Sedgwick County, crossing SH 59 which heads to Sedgwick. The freeway then veers eastward before turning back northeast toward Julesburg. I-76 comes to an exit at US 385, which heads northwest to Julesburg. I-76 then heads northeast to the Nebraska state line.

=== Nebraska ===
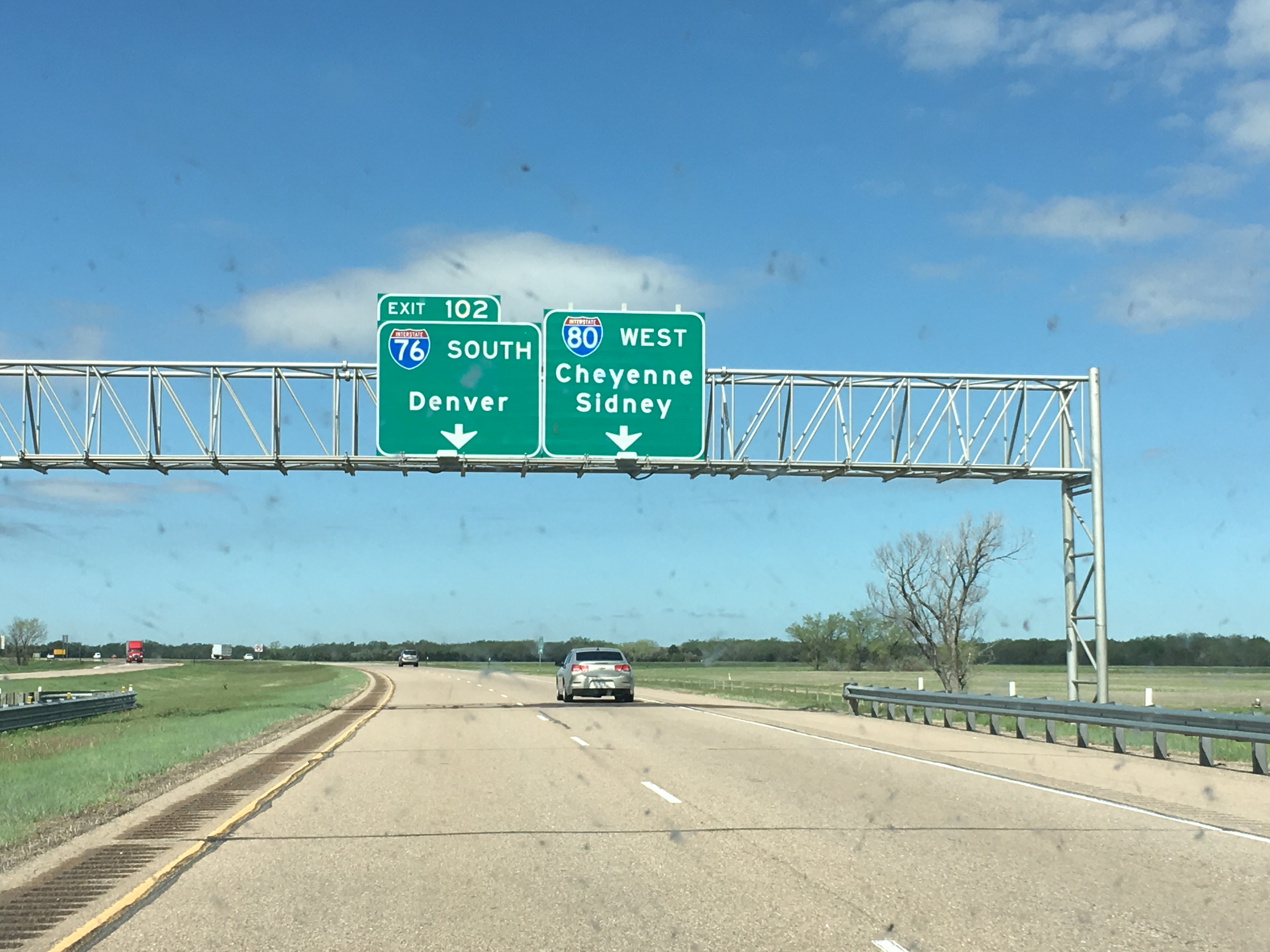
I-76 then signed as a north–south route in Nebraska as seen in 2018

In Nebraska, I-76 stretches just over three miles (4.8 km). It was signed as a north–south direction as opposed to the east–west designation in Colorado. Its entire route is located in Deuel County, parallel to the South Platte River and US 138. Its only interchange is at I-80, formerly numbered exit 102 based on I-80's mileage, now renumbered as exit 3 based on I-76's mileage.

== History ==
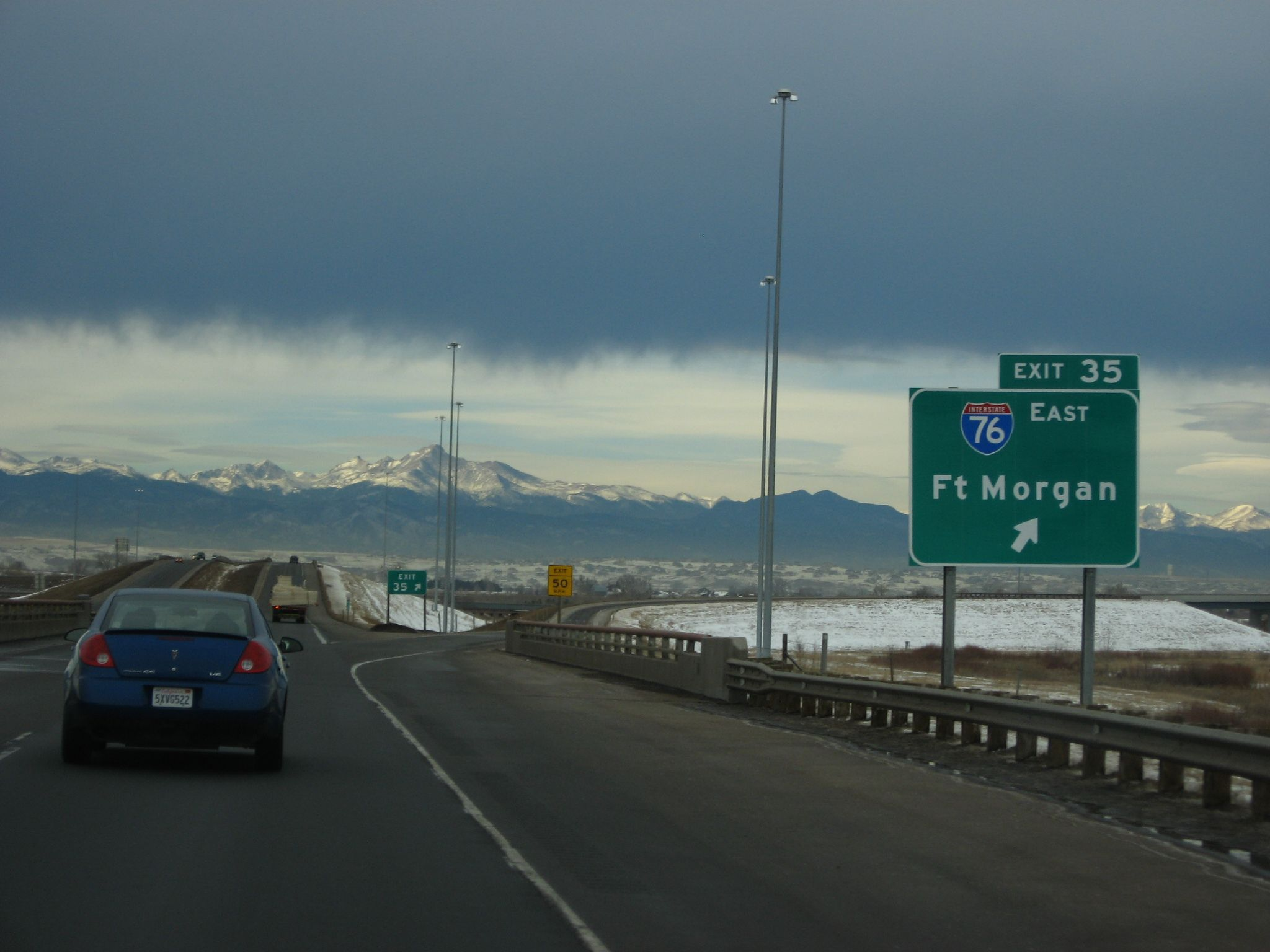
I-76 exit along E-470

Until 1974, both the segment of I-76 in Colorado and Nebraska and a portion of I-76 in Ohio, Pennsylvania, and New Jersey were signed as Interstate 80S (I-80S). In July 1974, the already-completed route, I-80S, was renumbered to I-76 in accordance with American Association of State Highway and Transportation Officials (AASHTO) policy to remove the letter suffixes from Interstate routes and to avoid the confusion of this route with I-80. This prompted the replacement of around 488 signs in eliminating I-80S. The number 76 is a reference to the then-forthcoming United States Bicentennial as well as 1876, the year Colorado was admitted as a state. Nebraska renumbered its existing Nebraska Highway 76 (N-76) to N-53 as a result.

I-76 was conceived in August 1958. The Colorado portion was planned and built first. In December 1969, the Nebraska Department of Roads (NDOR) worked together with the Colorado Department of Highways to open a three-mile-long (4.8 km) route connecting I-80 with the rest of I-80S in Colorado. The original western terminus of I-76 was at I-25, as planned. The western extension to I-70 was built in the late 1980s and early 1990s. By its completion in November 2002, the total cost was about $45.5 million (equivalent to $75.6 million in 2024).

In 1968, I-25 and US 85 were open to the general traffic to the Denver vicinity after all the structures located throughout the route were completed, as well as meeting the criteria of the Interstate standards. Structures connected several interchanges; each one connecting I-270, US 85, Dahlia Street, Washington Street, 74th Avenue, and York Street. The completion also included structures in which each cross the Burlington Canal, Platte River, and Union Pacific Railroad. By October 24, 1970, the route was open to traffic from Sedgwick to Julesburg, as well as the completion of the route, connecting from its western terminus of I-25 in Colorado to its eastern terminus at I-80 near Big Springs, Nebraska.

Beginning in 1990, six additional miles (9.7 km) were planned and constructed west of I-25. By October 2002, all of I-76 was open, and the highway reached its current western terminus at I-70 in Arvada.

== Exit list ==
State	County	Location	mi	km	Old exit	New exit	Destinations	Notes
Colorado	Jefferson	Arvada	0.000– 0.538	0.000– 0.866			I-70 west – Grand Junction	Western terminus; I-70 exit 269B. No access to I-70 east
Colorado	Jefferson	Arvada	0.000	0.000		1A	SH 121 (Wadsworth Boulevard)	Westbound exit and eastbound entrance
Colorado	Denver	No major junctions						
Colorado	Jefferson–Adams county line	Arvada–Berkley line	1.768	2.845		1B	SH 95 (Sheridan Boulevard)	
Colorado	Adams	Berkley	3.223	5.187		3	US 287 (Federal Boulevard)	
Colorado	Adams	Berkley–North Washington line	4.210	6.775		4	Pecos Street	
Colorado	Adams	North Washington	5.777	9.297		5	I-25 (US 87) – Fort Collins, Colorado Springs	Westbound access to I-25 north is via exit 6B; I-25 exits 216A-B
Colorado	Adams	North Washington	6.803	10.948		6	I-270 east (US 36 east) to I-70 east – Limon, Aurora	Serves Denver International Airport
Colorado	Adams	North Washington	6.803	10.948		6	I-270 west to US 36 – Fort Collins, Boulder	Westbound exit and entrance only; I-270 exit 1
Colorado	Adams	Adams City	8.052	12.958		8	SH 224 (74th Avenue)	Eastbound exit and westbound entrance
Colorado	Adams		9.483	15.261		9	US 6 west / US 85 south – Commerce City	Western end of US 6 / US 85 overlap; westbound exit and eastbound entrance
Colorado	Adams		10.466	16.843		10	88th Avenue	
Colorado	Adams		11.549	18.586		11	96th Avenue	
Colorado	Adams		12.502	20.120		12	US 85 north – Greeley	Eastern end of US 85 overlap; no eastbound entrance
Colorado	Adams	Brighton	16.477	26.517		16	Sable Boulevard to E-470 north / 120th Avenue – Fort Collins	
Colorado	Adams	Brighton	18.079	29.095		18	E-470 south to I-70 east – Limon, Colorado Springs	Westbound exit and eastbound entrance; E-470 exit 35
Colorado	Adams	Brighton	19.723	31.741		20	136th Avenue	
Colorado	Adams	Brighton	21.081	33.927		21	Eagle Boulevard	
Colorado	Adams	Brighton	22.407	36.061		22	Bromley Lane	
Colorado	Adams–Weld county line	Lochbuie	25.145	40.467		25	SH 7 west – Lochbuie, Brighton	
Colorado	Weld	Hudson	31.480	50.662		31	SH 52 – Hudson, Fort Lupton, Boulder	
Colorado	Weld	Hudson	34.412	55.381		34	CR 49 (Weld County Parkway)	
Colorado	Weld	Keenesburg	38.925	62.644		39	Keenesburg	
Colorado	Weld	Roggen	47.972	77.203		48	Roggen	
Colorado	Weld		49.236	79.238		49	Painter Road	Westbound exit and eastbound entrance
Colorado	Weld		57.219	92.085		57	County Road 91	
Colorado	Weld		61.828	99.503		60	To SH 144 east – Orchard	
Colorado	Morgan		63.883	102.810		64	Wiggins (US 6 east)	Eastern end of US 6 overlap; eastbound exit and westbound entrance
Colorado	Morgan		66.099– 66.288	106.376– 106.680		66A	SH 39 / SH 52 (US 6 west) – Goodrich, Wiggins, Jackson Lake State Park	Western end of US 6 and SH 52 overlaps
Colorado	Morgan		66.099– 66.288	106.376– 106.680		66B	US 34 west – Greeley, Estes Park	Western end of US 34 overlap; westbound exit and eastbound entrance only
Colorado	Morgan		73.130	117.691		73	Long Bridge Road	
Colorado	Morgan		75.280	121.151		75	I-76 BL east / US 34 east (SH 52 east) – Fort Morgan	Western terminus of I-76 BL; eastern end of US 34/SH 52 overlap
Colorado	Morgan		78.852	126.900		79	SH 144 – Weldona, Log Lane Village	
Colorado	Morgan	Fort Morgan	80.139	128.971		80	SH 52 – Fort Morgan, New Raymer	
Colorado	Morgan	Fort Morgan	81.648	131.400		82	Barlow Road – Morgan Community College	
Colorado	Morgan		85.713	137.942		86	Dodd Bridge Road	
Colorado	Morgan		88.695	142.741		89	Hospital Road	
Colorado	Morgan		89.643	144.266		90	SH 71 – Brush, Snyder	
Colorado	Morgan		91.693	147.566		92	I-76 BL / US 6 to US 34 / SH 71 south – Akron, Yuma, Wray, Limon, Brush	Eastern end of US 6 overlap; access to US 34 via unsigned US 34 Spur (I-76 BL west)
Colorado	Morgan		95.382	153.502		95	Hillrose	
Colorado	Washington		102.086	164.291		102	Merino	
Colorado	Logan		115.197	185.392		115	SH 63 to I-76 BL / US 6 – Atwood, Akron, Sterling	
Colorado	Logan	Sterling	124.756	200.775		125	US 6 – Sterling, Holyoke, Northeastern Junior College, North Sterling State Park	
Colorado	Logan		133.511	214.865		134	Iliff	
Colorado	Logan		140.846	226.670		141	Proctor	
Colorado	Logan		148.880	239.599		149	SH 55 – Crook	
Colorado	Logan		155.288	249.912		155	Red Lion Road	
Colorado	Sedgwick		164.933	265.434		165	SH 59 – Haxtun, Sedgwick	
Colorado	Sedgwick		172.017	276.835		172	Ovid	
Colorado	Sedgwick	Julesburg	180.221	290.038		180	US 385 – Julesburg	
			184.14 0.00	296.34 0.00	Colorado–Nebraska line			
Nebraska	Deuel		2.07	3.33	102	3	I-80 west – Sidney	Eastbound exit and westbound entrance; old exit number was based on I-80 mileage; I-80 exit 102
Nebraska	Deuel		3.15	5.07			I-80 east – Omaha	Eastern terminus; I-80 exit 102
1.000 mi = 1.609 km; 1.000 km = 0.621 mi: Concurrency terminus; Electronic toll collection; Incomplete access

== Business routes ==
=== Keenesburg ===
Interstate 76 Business
- Location: Keenesburg, Colorado
- Length: 0.47 mi (760 m)

Interstate 76 Business (I-76 Bus) is an unsigned business spur that connects Keenesburg, Colorado, in Weld County to the Interstate. Inventoried by the Colorado Department of Transportation (CDOT), the 0.5-mile (0.80 km) route begins at the I-76 frontage road (County Road 398) within the town limits and heads north as Market Street. The route terminates north of I-76 exit 39.

Major intersections
The entire route is in Keenesburg, Weld County.

mi	km	Destinations	Notes
0.472	0.760	County Road 398	Southern terminus; former US 6 / SH 2; road continues as Market Street
0.181	0.291	I-76 (US 6)	I-76 exit 39
0.000	0.000	Road 18	Northern terminus
1.000 mi = 1.609 km; 1.000 km = 0.621 mi

=== Fort Morgan–Sterling ===
Interstate 76 Business
- Location: Fort Morgan–Sterling, Colorado
- Length: 52.31 mi (84.18 km)

Interstate 76 Business (I-76 Bus) is a business route of I-76 serving Fort Morgan, Colorado, and adjacent areas to Sterling in Morgan and Logan counties. This 52.31-mile (84.18 km) route is the longest continuously signed Interstate business loop in the system. It begins at exit 75 at I-76 west of Fort Morgan. The route overlaps US 34 and SH 52 heading east and becomes W Platte Avenue. After intersecting Sherman Street, SH 52 turns North on Main Street and the route becomes East Platte Avenue, only overlapping US 34. After crossing County Road 21, the route is only assigned as US 34. Entering Brush, the route becomes Edison Street and passes toward the south of town, remaining parallel with the Interstate. Intersecting Colorado Avenue, the route starts overlapping SH 71. SH 71 goes south after the route exits Brush. Then, I-76 Bus comes across a minor Y interchange and US 34 continues east while the business loop proceeds northeast. It interchanges with I-76 again at a partial cloverleaf interchange and starts overlapping US 6. It passes through unincorporated Camden and then enters Hillrose as Railway Street. It remains signed with US 6 after crossing County Road 3305. It remains almost parallel with the Interstate until it approaches the Prewitt Reservoir, where it turns north through Beta and into Merino, becoming Platte Street between Ram Avenue and Logan Avenue. The route continues northeast into Atwood and intersects SH 63, becoming Front Avenue toward 7th Street, remaining concurrent with US 6. The route then enters Sterling, becoming a one-way street between South 3rd Avenue and South Division Avenue, where the route becomes a two-lane road, turns north, and then becomes South 3rd Street. The route turns to the southeast at Chestnut Street and exits town. I-76 Bus meets I-76 and terminates there at a diamond interchange at exit 125, and US 6 continues east past the Interstate.

Major intersections

County	Location	mi	km	Destinations	Notes
Morgan		0.000	0.000	I-76 (US 6) / US 34 west (SH 52 west)	Western terminus; western end of US 34/SH 52 concurrency; I-76 exit 75
Morgan	Fort Morgan	4.4	7.1	SH 52 east (Main Street) to I-76	Eastern end of SH 52 concurrency
Morgan	Brush	14.5	23.3	SH 71 north (Colorado Street) to I-76	Western end of SH 71 concurrency
Morgan		16.0	25.7	SH 71 south – Last Chance, Limon	Eastern end of SH 71 concurrency
Morgan		16.41	26.41	US 34 east – Akron; US 34 Spur begins	Eastern end of US 34 concurrency; western end of unsigned US 34 Spur concurrency
Morgan		17.31	27.86	US 34 Spur ends US 6 west / I-76 – Denver	Eastern end of US 34 Spur concurrency; western end of US 6 concurrency; I-76 exit 92
Washington		28.87	46.46	County Road Q to I-76	
Logan	Atwood	43.91	70.67	SH 63 south – Akron	Northern terminus of SH 63
Logan	Sterling	50.02	80.50	US 138 east (3rd Street north) / SH 14 west (Chestnut Street west) – Julesburg, Fort Collins	Western terminus of US 138; eastern terminus of SH 14
Logan	Sterling	50.92	81.95	Front Street	Interchange; no westbound entrance
Logan	Sterling	52.31	84.18	US 6 east / I-76	Eastern terminus; eastern end of US 6 concurrency; I-76 exit 125; highway continues as US 6 east
1.000 mi = 1.609 km; 1.000 km = 0.621 mi: Concurrency terminus; Incomplete access
