= Colorado State Highway 61 =

State highway in Colorado, United States

State Highway 61
- SH 61 highlighted in red

Route information
- Maintained by CDOT
- Length: 40.8 mi (65.7 km)

Major junctions
- South end: US 34 at Otis
- North end: US 6 to I-76 at Sterling

Location
- Country: United States
- State: Colorado
- Counties: Washington, Logan

Highway system
- Colorado State Highway System; Interstate; US; State; Scenic
← SH 60	→ SH 62

State Highway 61 (SH 61) is a 40.8-mile (65.7 km) state highway in northeastern Colorado. SH 61's southern terminus is at U.S. Route 34 (US 34) in Otis, and the northern terminus is at US 6 in Sterling.

== Route description ==
SH 61 begins at an at-grade intersection with US 34 at the south side of Otis. It begins straight northward through town, in which roads are laid out in a grid-like pattern. The road then exits the town, entering sparsely populated wilderness. Near the Washington - Logan county line, the road abruptly turns westward and eastward again, crossing the boundary a few miles later. It then meets its northern terminus at US 6 east of Sterling. Interstate 76 (I-76) is accessed by following US 6 west from the northern terminus.

== History ==
The road was established in the 1920s, when it connected US 36 near Cope to US 38 (former) near Sterling. When US 38 was moved around 1930, the terminus was redefined as SH 154, which took its place. The section from its current terminus at Otis to US 36 was deleted and the northern terminus was adjusted to US 6, which later became I-76, in 1954. The route was entirely paved three years later.

== Major intersections ==
County	Location	mi	km	Destinations	Notes
Washington	Otis	0.000	0.000	US 34 (First Avenue)	Southern terminus
Logan		40.993	65.972	US 6 to I-76 – Julesburg, Sterling, Holyoke	Northern terminus; to I-76 exit 125
1.000 mi = 1.609 km; 1.000 km = 0.621 mi
