= Interstate 76 Business =

Interstate 76 Business or Business Interstate 76 may refer to the following Business Interstate Highways that connect to Interstate 76:

- Interstate 76 Business (Fort Morgan–Sterling, Colorado)
- Interstate 76 Business (Keenesburg, Colorado)
- Interstate 76 Connector, an unsigned business route in Camden, New Jersey
