= Colorado State Highway 144 =

Highway in Colorado

State Highway 144
- SH 144 highlighted in red

Route information
- Maintained by CDOT
- Length: 28.796 mi (46.343 km)

Major junctions
- West end: I-76 west of Wiggins
- US 34 south of Orchard; I-76 west of Fort Morgan
- East end: SH 52 in Fort Morgan

Location
- Country: United States
- State: Colorado
- Counties: Morgan

Highway system
- Colorado State Highway System; Interstate; US; State; Scenic
← SH 142	→ SH 145

State Highway 144 (SH 144) is a 28.796 mi (46.3 km) long state highway in northeastern Colorado. SH 144's western terminus is at Interstate 76 (I-76) west of Wiggins, and the eastern terminus is at SH 52 in Fort Morgan.

== Route description ==
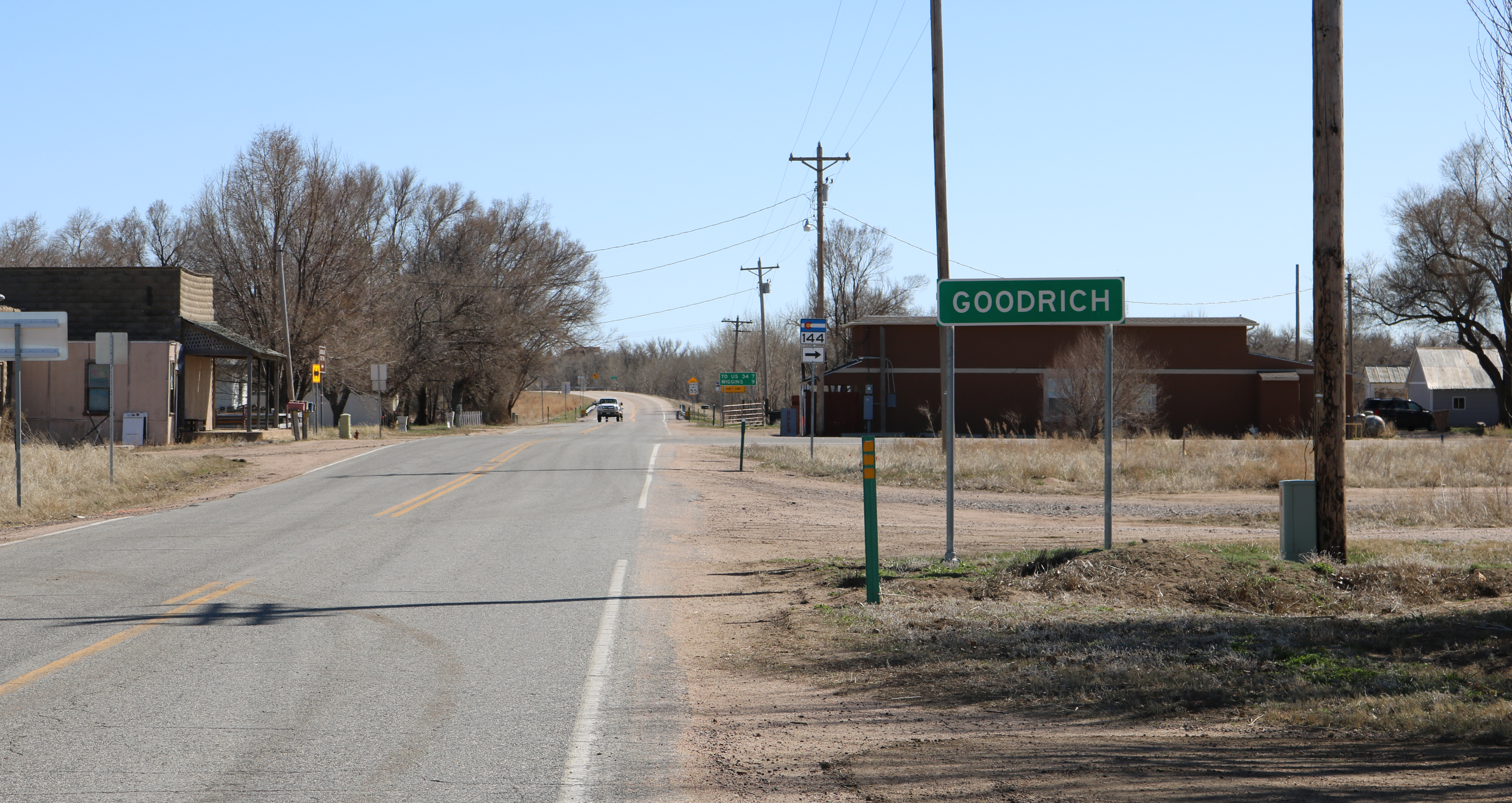
SH 144 at the northern terminus of SH 39 in Goodrich

SH 144 begins in the west at I-76 and proceeds initially to the north; after 2.8 mi (4.5 km), the road crosses U.S. Route 34 (US 34). After another 3.8 mi (6.1 km), the route crosses the South Platte River and begins to curve in a broad arc to the east roughly following a meander of the South Platte. Continuing now in a generally eastward direction, SH 144 meets the north end of SH 39 at Goodrich. The road then continues its arc eastward and eventually ESE through Weldona, again across the South Platte River, and through Log Lane Village. Now traveling in approximately a southeasterly direction, SH 144 crosses to the south side of I-76 and continues for a further 1.4 mi (2.3 km) to its eastern terminus at SH 52 in Fort Morgan.

== Major intersections ==
The entire route is in Morgan County.

Location	mi	km	Destinations	Notes
	0.000	0.000	I-76 – Denver, Fort Morgan	Western terminus; I-76 frontage road
	2.821	4.540	US 34	
Goodrich	10.493	16.887	SH 39 south – Wiggins	Northern terminus of SH 39
	27.419	44.127	I-76	I-76 exit 79
Fort Morgan	28.796	46.343	SH 52	Eastern terminus
1.000 mi = 1.609 km; 1.000 km = 0.621 mi
