= Prewitt Reservoir =

Prewitt Reservoir Dam
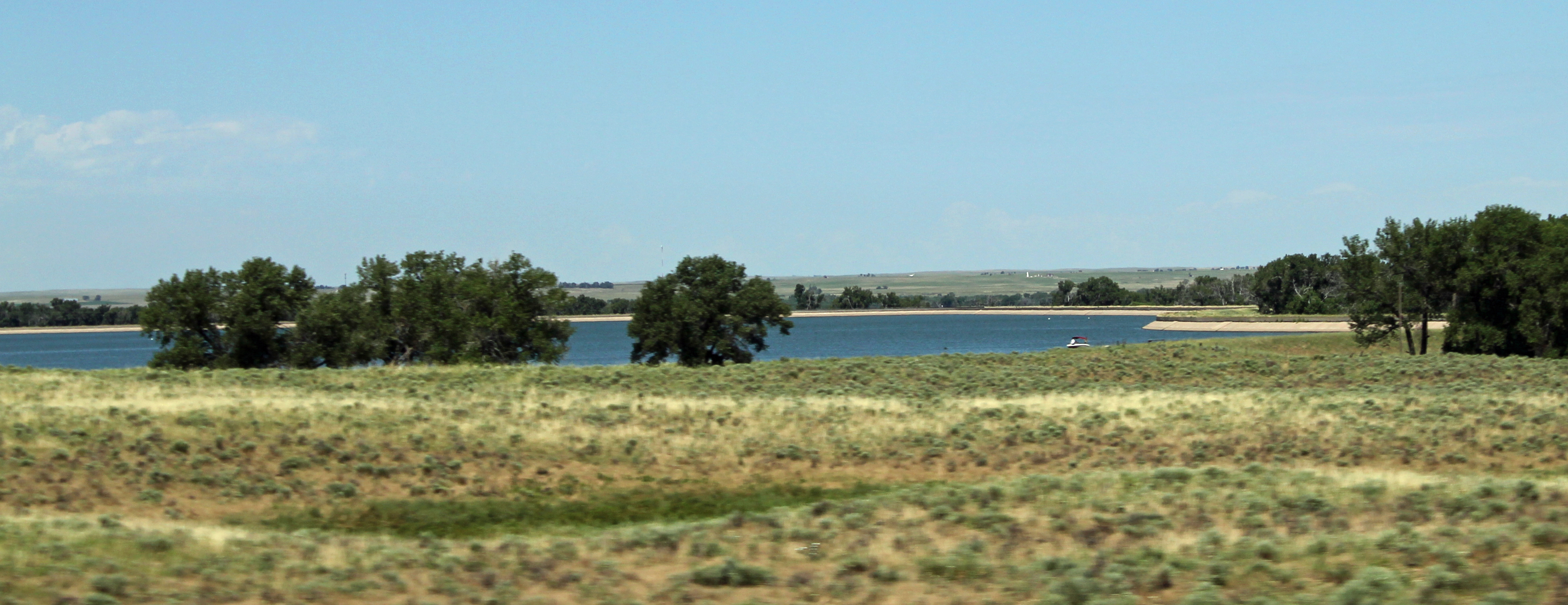
- The reservoir as seen from Interstate 76 near Sterling, Colorado

- Location within Colorado
- Country: United States
- Location: Washington and Logan County, Colorado
- Coordinates: 40°25′21″N 103°21′42″W
- Construction began: 1910
- Opening date: 1912
- Built by: Great Western Sugar Company

Reservoir
- Creates: Prewitt Reservoir
- Surface area: 2,340 acres (950 ha)
- Normal elevation: 1,247 m (4,091 ft)

Prewitt Reservoir is an irrigation and recreation reservoir in Washington and Logan counties in northeastern Colorado. When full, the reservoir's surface area is 2,340 acres (950 ha). The reservoir is located about 18 miles (29 km) northeast of Fort Morgan, Colorado along the South Platte River.

== History ==
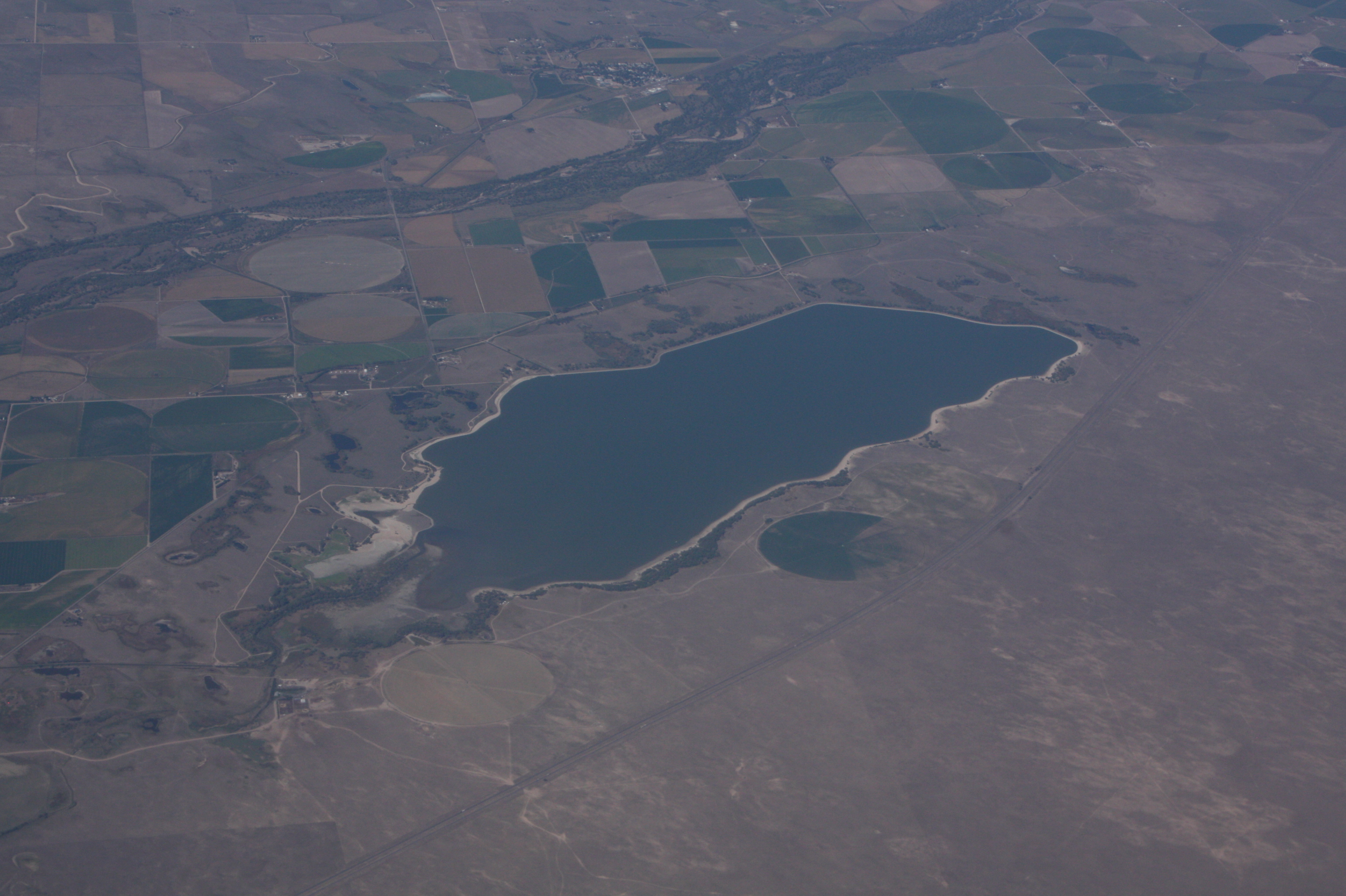
Oblique air photo of Prewitt Reservoir in September 2018.

Prewitt Reservoir was financed and built by the Great Western Sugar Company and began construction in 1910. The reservoir helps supply sufficient water for the irrigation of sugar beets. Construction was completed in 1912.

== Fishing ==
Popular with fishermen, the reservoir is stocked with walleye, saugeye, channel catfish, wipers and black crappie.
