= Rabbit Valley (Colorado) =

Colorado State Natural Area in Colorado, United States

Coordinates: 39°10′17.94″N 109°1′14.40″W

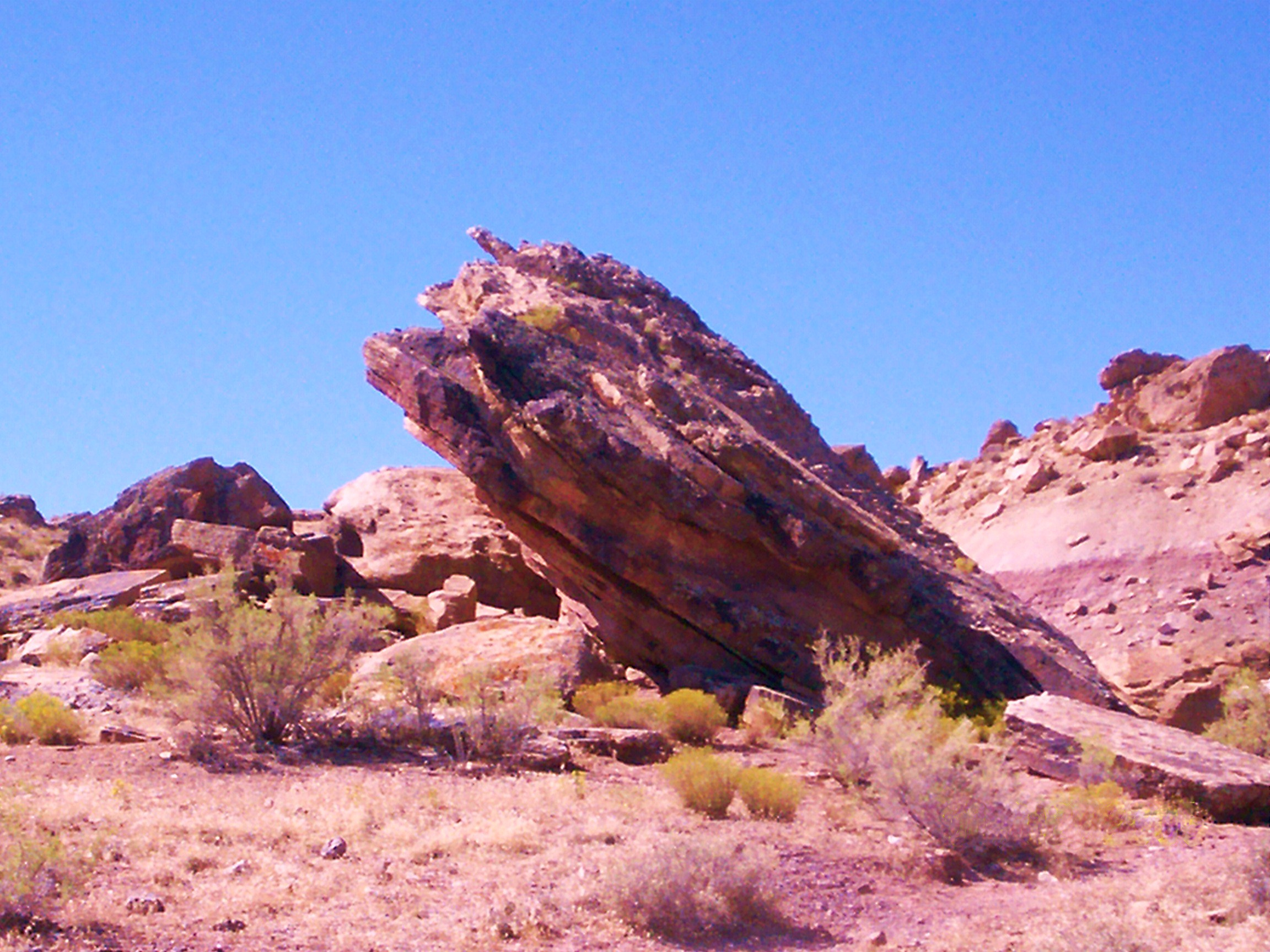

- Location within Colorado Location within the United States
- Location: Mesa County, Colorado, United States
- Nearest city: Grand Junction, CO
- Area: 280 acres (110 ha)
- Governing body: Bureau of Land Management

Rabbit Valley is a valley located in northwestern Mesa County, Colorado, United States. The site was discovered by a local Colorado couple in 1981 Rabbit Valley contains numerous prehistoric remains from the Late Jurassic Period. Nearly 4,000 bones have been found here, including Apatosaurus, Camarasaurus, Diplodocus, a supersaurid, a diplodocid. Rabbit Valley is accessed by Interstate 70/U.S. Route 6/U.S. Route 50.
