= Log Lane Village, Colorado =

Town in Colorado, United States

- Statutory Town
- Town of Log Lane Village
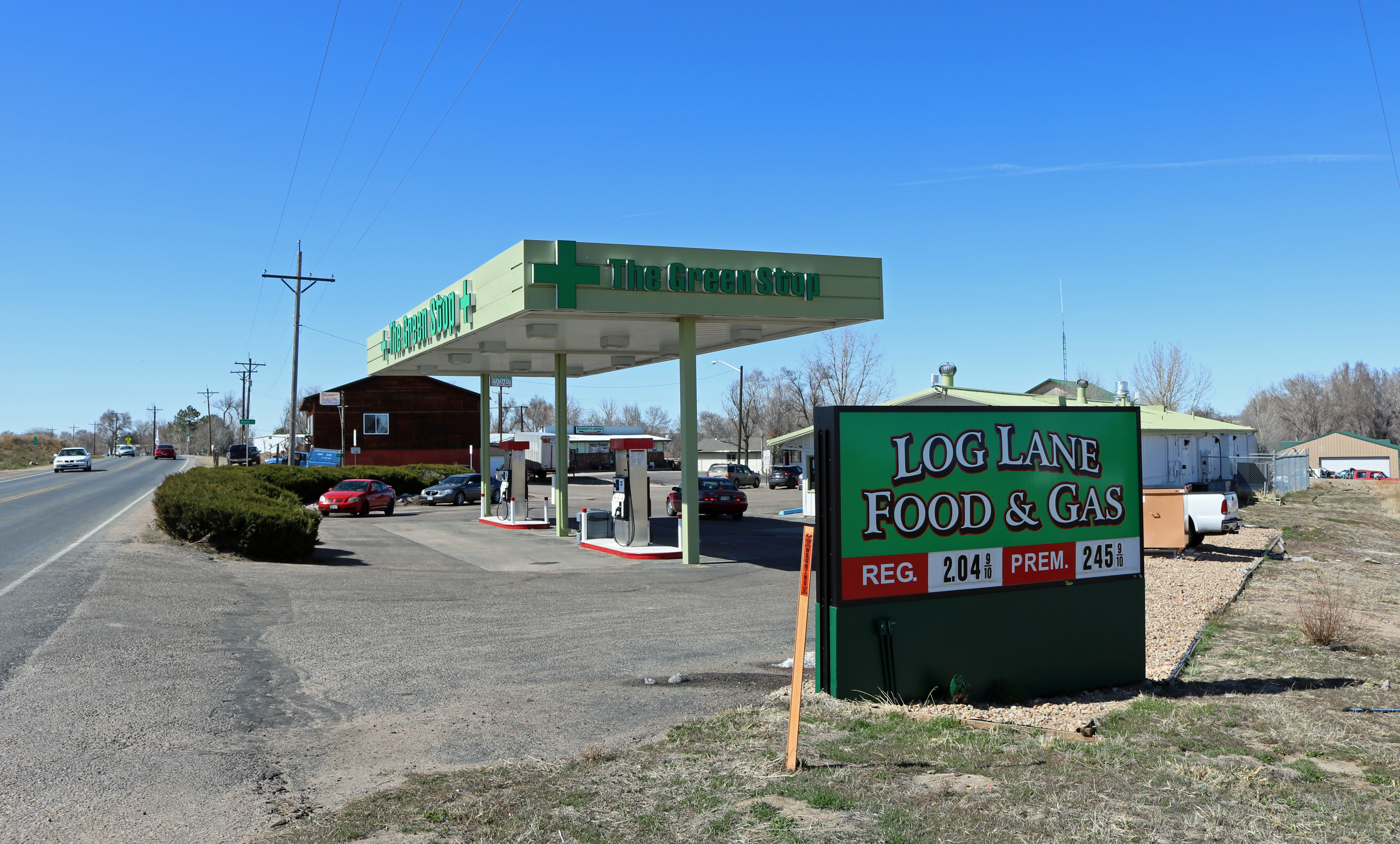
- A gas station in Log Lane Village

- Location in Morgan County, Colorado
- Coordinates: 40°16′11″N 103°49′44″W
- Country: United States
- State: Colorado
- County: Morgan
- Incorporated (town): June 12, 1956

Government
  - Type: Statutory Town

Area
  - Total: 0.20 sq mi (0.51 km^{2})
  - Land: 0.20 sq mi (0.51 km^{2})
  - Water: 0 sq mi (0.00 km^{2})
- Elevation: 4,308 ft (1,313 m)

Population (2020)
  - Total: 913
  - Density: 4,658.2/sq mi (1,798.5/km^{2})
- Time zone: UTC-7 (Mountain (MST))
  - Summer (DST): UTC-6 (MDT)
- ZIP code: 80705
- Area code: 970
- FIPS code: 08-45695
- GNIS feature ID: 2412910
- Website: www.townofllv.com

Log Lane Village is a statutory town in Morgan County, Colorado, United States. The population was 913 at the 2020 census.

Log Lane Village was named from the presence of log houses in the town.

== History ==
Prior to settlement, the area around Log Lane Village was the traditional territory of the Arapaho and Cheyenne Native Americans. Settlement in the area began in the 19th century. The area around Log Lane Village and the adjacent Fort Morgan began to see greater growth following the construction of the Union Pacific Railroad. The town itself was established in 1956. Today it serves largely as a suburb for the larger Fort Morgan.

== Geography ==
Log Lane Village is located in central Morgan County 2 miles (3 km) northwest of Fort Morgan, the county seat. The town is bordered to the northeast by the South Platte River and by Colorado State Highway 144 to the southwest. Interstate 76 passes just south of the town, with access to Highway 144 at Exit 79. I-76 leads southwest 80 miles (130 km) to Denver and northeast 47 miles (76 km) to Sterling.

According to the United States Census Bureau, the town has a total area of 0.2 square miles (0.52 km^{2}), all of it land.

== Demographics ==
Historical population
Census	Pop.	Note	%±
1960	310		—
1970	329		6.1%
1980	709		115.5%
1990	667		−5.9%
2000	1,006		50.8%
2010	873		−13.2%
2020	913		4.6%
U.S. Decennial Census

As of the census of 2000, there were 1,006 people, 289 households, and 239 families residing in the town. The population density was 4,043.5 inhabitants per square mile (1,561.2/km^{2}). There were 324 housing units at an average density of 1,302.3 per square mile (502.8/km^{2}). The racial makeup of the town was 73.86% White, 0.50% African American, 1.49% Native American, 0.89% Asian, 19.58% from other races, and 3.68% from two or more races. Hispanic or Latino of any race were 52.78% of the population.

There were 289 households, out of which 52.6% had children under the age of 18 living with them, 65.7% were married couples living together, 12.8% had a female householder with no husband present, and 17.0% were non-families. 12.8% of all households were made up of individuals, and 3.8% had someone living alone who was 65 years of age or older. The average household size was 3.48 and the average family size was 3.83.

In the town, the population was spread out, with 38.5% under the age of 18, 9.4% from 18 to 24, 29.8% from 25 to 44, 16.9% from 45 to 64, and 5.4% who were 65 years of age or older. The median age was 26 years. For every 100 females, there were 106.6 males. For every 100 females age 18 and over, there were 99.7 males.

The median income for a household in the town was $33,947, and the median income for a family was $35,536. Males had a median income of $25,913 versus $19,167 for females. The per capita income for the town was $11,502. About 13.0% of families and 16.6% of the population were below the poverty line, including 20.0% of those under age 18 and 9.3% of those age 65 or over.

== Economy ==
As of 2020, four marijuana dispensaries operate in Log Lane Village.

== See also ==
- Morgan County, Colorado
