= Weldona, Colorado =

Census-designated place in Morgan County, CO, USA

- Census-designated place
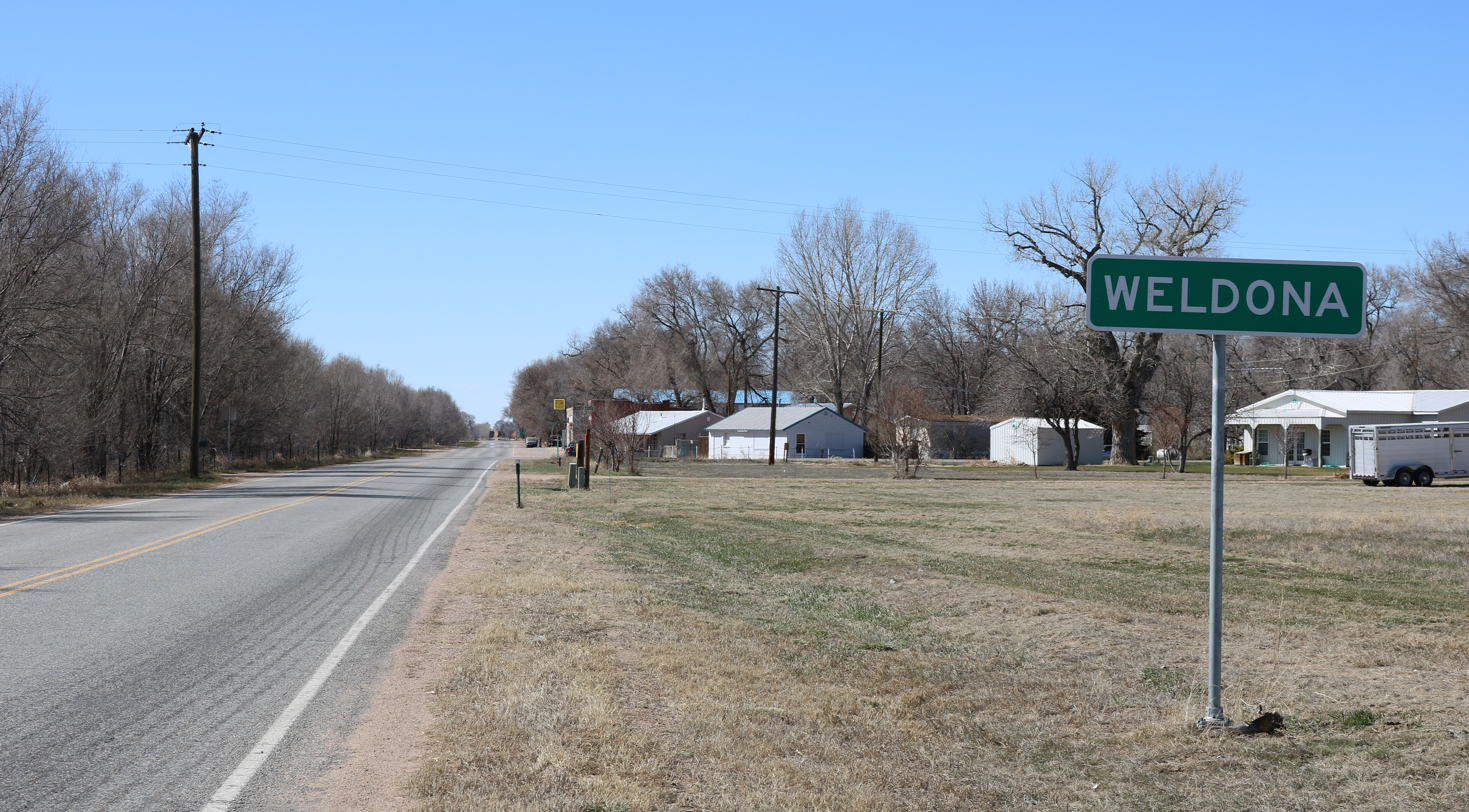
- Weldona and Colorado State Highway 144.
- Nickname: The Valley
- Location of the Weldona CDP in Morgan County, Colorado
- Coordinates: 40°20′54″N 103°58′10″W
- Country: United States
- State: Colorado
- County: Morgan County

Government
  - Type: unincorporated town

Area
  - Total: 0.157 sq mi (0.406 km^{2})
  - Land: 0.157 sq mi (0.406 km^{2})
  - Water: 0 sq mi (0.000 km^{2})
- Elevation: 4,354 ft (1,327 m)

Population (2020)
  - Total: 113
  - Density: 721/sq mi (278/km^{2})
- Time zone: UTC-7 (MST)
  - Summer (DST): UTC-6 (MDT)
- ZIP Code: 80653
- Area code: 970
- GNIS feature ID: 2583315

Weldona is an unincorporated town, a post office, and a census-designated place (CDP) located in and governed by Morgan County, Colorado, United States. The CDP is a part of the Fort Morgan, CO Micropolitan Statistical Area. The Weldona post office has the ZIP Code 80653. At the United States Census 2020, the population of the Weldona CDP was 113.

== History ==
The Weldona post office has been in operation since 1907. The community was named after one General Weldon.

== Geography ==
The Weldona CDP has an area of 100 acres (0.406 km^{2}), all land.

== Demographics ==
The United States Census Bureau initially defined the Weldona CDP for the United States Census 2010.

Weldona CDP, Colorado
Year	Pop.	±%
2010	139	—
2020	113	−18.7%
Source: United States Census Bureau

== Education ==
The Weldon Valley School District RE-20J serves Weldona.

== See also ==
- Fort Morgan Micropolitan Statistical Area
