= Goodrich, Colorado =

Unincorporated community in Morgan County, CO, USA

Goodrich
- Unincorporated community
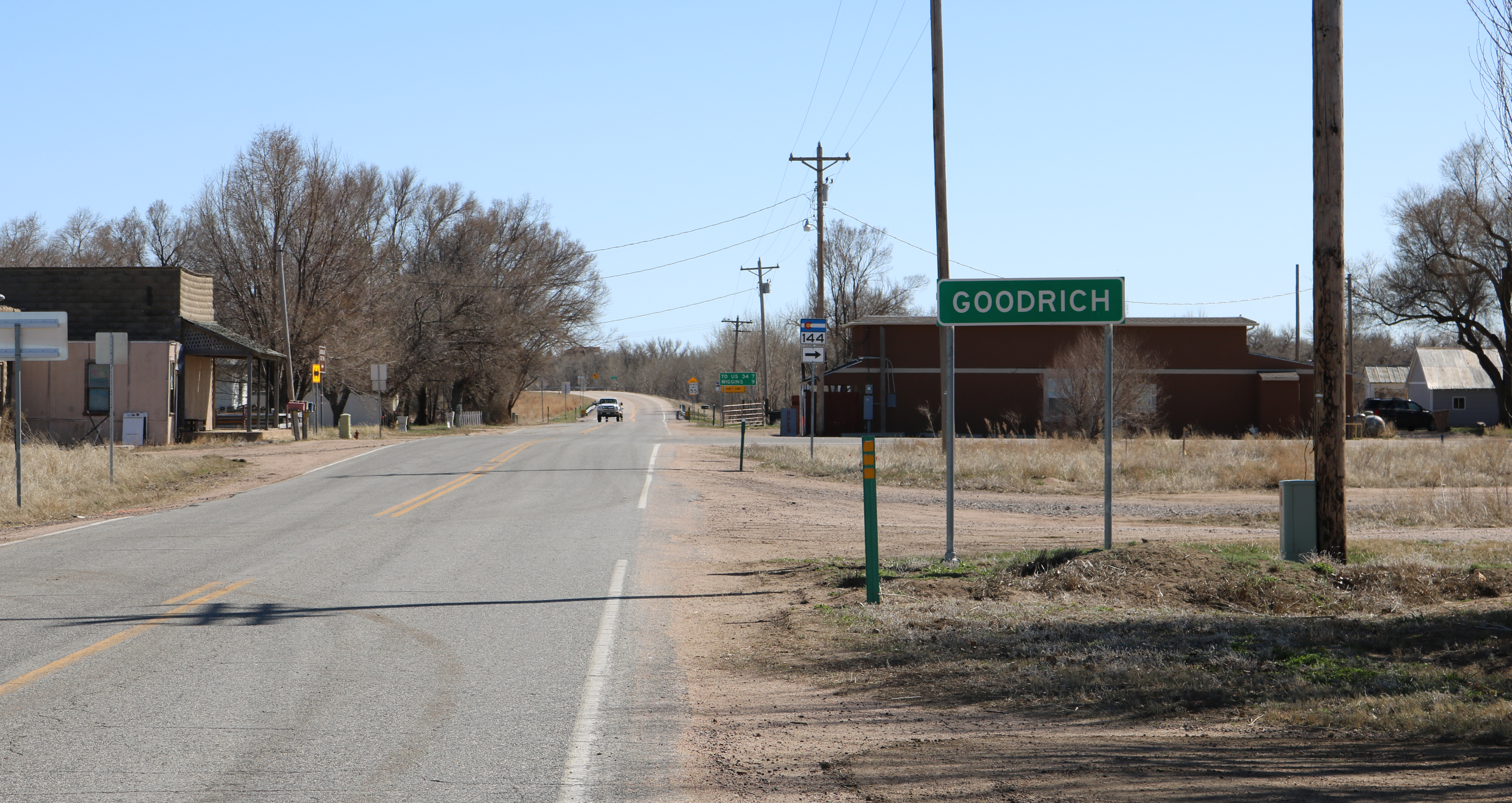
- Goodrich in 2016.

- Location in Morgan County and the state of Colorado Goodrich (the United States)
- Coordinates: 40°21′3.94″N 104°3′41.82″W
- Country: United States
- State: State of Colorado
- County: Morgan
- Elevation: 4,383 ft (1,336 m)
- Time zone: UTC-7 (MST)
  - Summer (DST): UTC-6 (MDT)
- Area code: 970

Goodrich is an unincorporated community in Morgan County, Colorado United States near Orchard, Colorado and Fort Morgan, Colorado. Jackson Lake State Park is located northwest of Goodrich.

A post office called Goodrich was established in 1908, and remained in operation until 1974. The community was named after G. T. Goodrich, an early settler.

== See also ==
- Outline of Colorado
  - Index of Colorado-related articles
- State of Colorado
  - Colorado cities and towns
    - Colorado census designated places
  - Colorado counties
    - Morgan County, Colorado
  - Colorado metropolitan areas
    - Fort Morgan, CO Micropolitan Statistical Area
