= Otis, Colorado =

Town in Colorado, United States

- Town
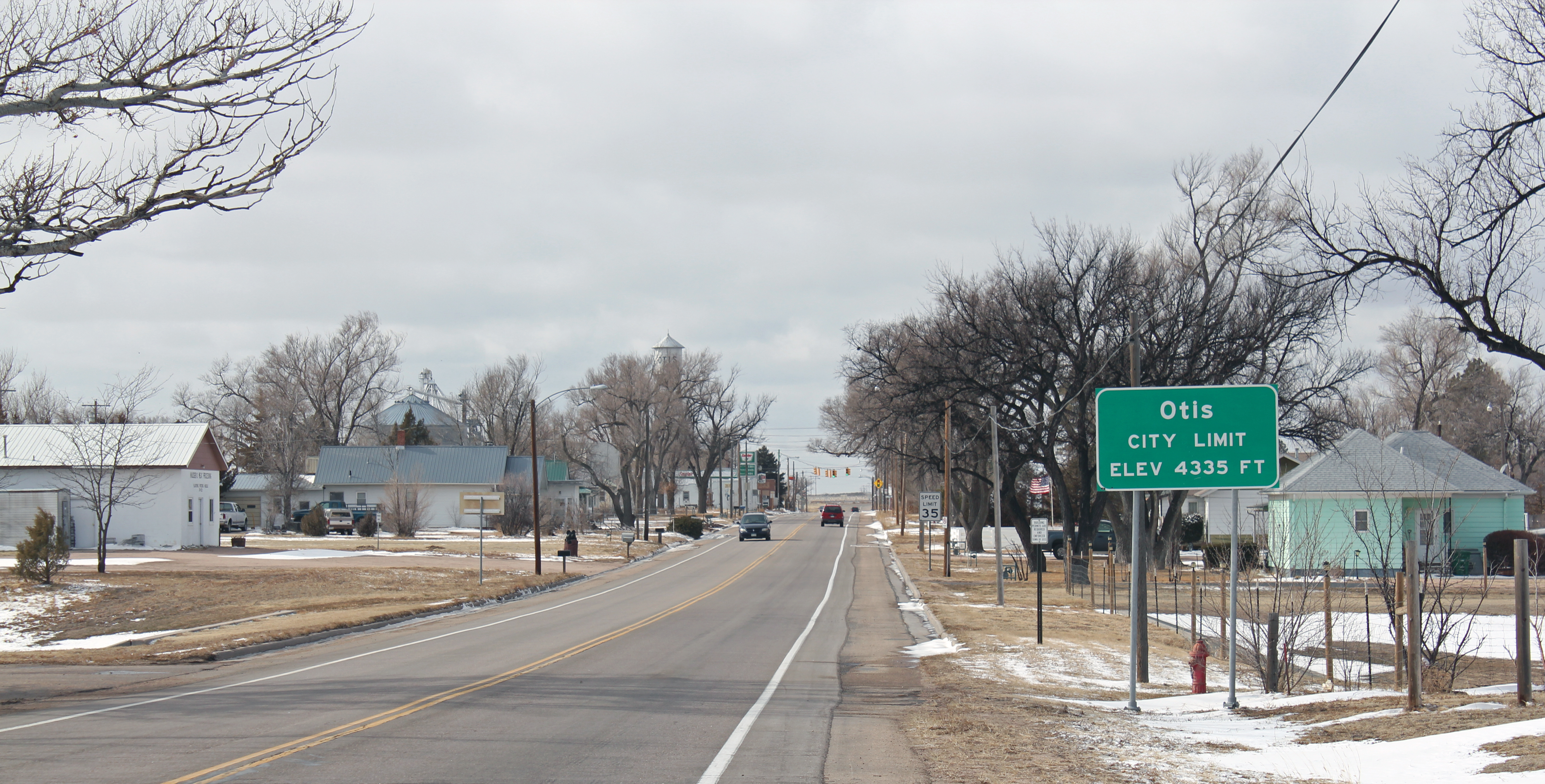
- Entering Otis from the east (2013)

- Location within Washington County and Colorado
- Coordinates: 40°09′00″N 102°57′44″W
- Country: United States
- State: Colorado
- County: Washington
- Incorporated (town): March 27, 1917

Government
  - Type: Statutory Town

Area
  - Total: 0.41 sq mi (1.07 km^{2})
  - Land: 0.41 sq mi (1.07 km^{2})
  - Water: 0 sq mi (0.00 km^{2})
- Elevation: 4,331 ft (1,320 m)

Population (2020)
  - Total: 511
  - Density: 1,240/sq mi (478/km^{2})
- Time zone: UTC-7 (Mountain (MST))
  - Summer (DST): UTC-6 (MDT)
- ZIP code: 80743
- Area code: 970
- FIPS code: 08-56365
- GNIS feature ID: 2413094
- Website: townofotis.colorado.gov

Otis is a Statutory Town in Washington County, Colorado, United States. The population was 511 at the 2020 census.

== History ==
Otis was established in 1882 as a construction campsite for workers building the Burlington & Missouri River rail line from Lincoln Nebraska to Denver, Colorado. According to tradition, the community was named after W. O. Otis, a pioneer settler. The post office opened in 1886 and the town was platted in 1887.

== Geography ==
According to the United States Census Bureau, the town has a total area of 0.4 square miles (1.0 km^{2}), all of it land.

== Demographics ==
Historical population
Census	Pop.	Note	%±
1920	467		—
1930	529		13.3%
1940	498		−5.9%
1950	532		6.8%
1960	568		6.8%
1970	521		−8.3%
1980	534		2.5%
1990	451		−15.5%
2000	534		18.4%
2010	475		−11.0%
2020	511		7.6%

=== Climate ===
According to the Köppen Climate Classification system, Otis has a semi-arid climate, abbreviated "BSk" on climate maps.

Climate data for Otis, Colorado
Month	Jan	Feb	Mar	Apr	May	Jun	Jul	Aug	Sep	Oct	Nov	Dec	Year
Mean daily maximum °C (°F)	4 (39)	7 (44)	11 (51)	16 (60)	21 (70)	28 (82)	32 (90)	30 (86)	26 (78)	18 (65)	10 (50)	4 (40)	17 (63)
Mean daily minimum °C (°F)	−11 (13)	−8 (17)	−4 (24)	0 (32)	6 (42)	11 (52)	14 (58)	13 (56)	8 (47)	2 (35)	−5 (23)	−10 (14)	1 (34)
Average precipitation mm (inches)	7.6 (0.3)	10 (0.4)	25 (1)	43 (1.7)	71 (2.8)	58 (2.3)	66 (2.6)	58 (2.3)	30 (1.2)	23 (0.9)	15 (0.6)	10 (0.4)	420 (16.6)
Source: Weatherbase

== See also ==
- Colorado municipalities
