= Wiggins, Colorado =

Town in Colorado, United States

- Town
- Town of Wiggins
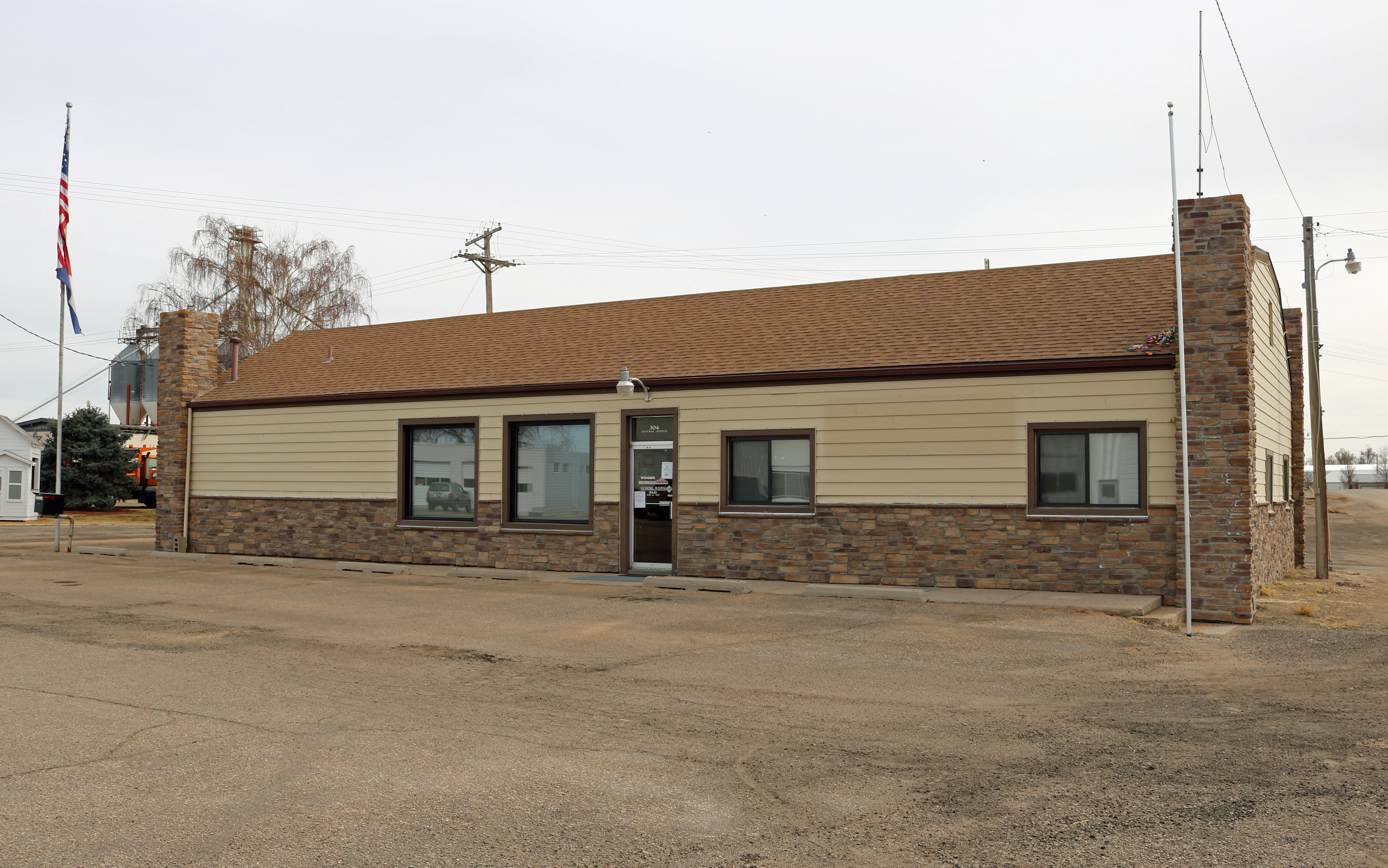
- The Wiggins Municipal Building

- Location in Morgan County, Colorado
- Coordinates: 40°13′43″N 104°04′21″W
- Country: United States
- State: Colorado
- County: Morgan County
- Established: 1882
- Incorporated: October 11, 1974
- Named for: Oliver P. Wiggins

Government
  - Type: Statutory town

Area
  - Total: 1.33 sq mi (3.44 km^{2})
  - Land: 1.32 sq mi (3.43 km^{2})
  - Water: 0.0039 sq mi (0.01 km^{2})
- Elevation: 4,547 ft (1,386 m)

Population (2020)
  - Total: 1,401
  - Density: 1,059/sq mi (409/km^{2})
- Time zone: UTC-7 (Mountain (MST))
  - Summer (DST): UTC-6 (MDT)
- ZIP code: 80654
- Area code: 970
- FIPS code: 08-84770
- GNIS feature ID: 2413486
- Website: www.wigginsco.gov

Wiggins is a statutory town in Morgan County, Colorado, United States. The population was 1,401 as of the 2020 census, up from 893 at the 2010 census.

The community was established in 1882 as the Burlington Railroad depot of "Corona". Around 1900, Corona was renamed in honor of Oliver P. Wiggins, who had served as a guide and scout for Captain John C. Frémont on some of his explorations through northern Colorado in the 1840s and who had accompanied Kit Carson for 12 years on his expeditions.

== Geography ==
Wiggins is in western Morgan County on the south side of Interstate 76, which leads east 15 miles (24 km) to Fort Morgan, the county seat, and southwest 64 miles (103 km) to Denver. U.S. Route 34 splits off from I-76 just north of the town, leading northwest 38 miles (61 km) to Greeley.

According to the United States Census Bureau, the town of Wiggins has a total area of 1.3 square miles (3.4 km^{2}), of which 0.004 square miles (0.010 km^{2}), or 0.30%, are water.

== Demographics ==
Historical population
| Census | Pop. | Note | %± |
|---|---|---|---|
| 1980 | 531 | | — |
| 1990 | 499 | | −6.0% |
| 2000 | 838 | | 67.9% |
| 2010 | 893 | | 6.6% |
| 2020 | 1,401 | | 56.9% |
U.S. Decennial Census

=== 2020 census ===
As of the 2020 census, Wiggins had a population of 1,401. The median age was 30.2 years. 31.3% of residents were under the age of 18 and 10.1% of residents were 65 years of age or older. For every 100 females there were 95.4 males, and for every 100 females age 18 and over there were 99.8 males age 18 and over.

0.0% of residents lived in urban areas, while 100.0% lived in rural areas.

There were 507 households in Wiggins, of which 41.4% had children under the age of 18 living in them. Of all households, 54.6% were married-couple households, 16.4% were households with a male householder and no spouse or partner present, and 20.7% were households with a female householder and no spouse or partner present. About 21.3% of all households were made up of individuals and 7.5% had someone living alone who was 65 years of age or older.

There were 561 housing units, of which 9.6% were vacant. The homeowner vacancy rate was 2.3% and the rental vacancy rate was 7.3%.

Racial composition as of the 2020 census
| Race | Number | Percent |
|---|---|---|
| White | 1,083 | 77.3% |
| Black or African American | 17 | 1.2% |
| American Indian and Alaska Native | 7 | 0.5% |
| Asian | 8 | 0.6% |
| Native Hawaiian and Other Pacific Islander | 0 | 0.0% |
| Some other race | 141 | 10.1% |
| Two or more races | 145 | 10.3% |
| Hispanic or Latino (of any race) | 322 | 23.0% |

=== 2000 census ===
As of the census of 2000, there were 838 people, 265 households, and 210 families residing in the town. The population density was 938.4 inhabitants per square mile (362.3/km^{2}). There were 279 housing units at an average density of 312.4 per square mile (120.6/km^{2}). The racial makeup of the town was 82.10% White, 1.19% African American, 2.27% Native American, 12.89% from other races, and 1.55% from two or more races. Hispanic or Latino of any race were 25.06% of the population.

There were 265 households, out of which 46.8% had children under the age of 18 living with them, 62.6% were married couples living together, 10.9% had a female householder with no husband present, and 20.4% were non-families. 17.0% of all households were made up of individuals, and 7.2% had someone living alone who was 65 years of age or older. The average household size was 3.16 and the average family size was 3.52.

The age of the town's population is spread out, with 37.0% under the age of 18, 7.8% from 18 to 24, 28.0% from 25 to 44, 19.6% from 45 to 64, and 7.6% who were 65 years of age or older. The median age was 30 years. For every 100 females, there were 100.5 males. For every 100 females age 18 and over, there were 98.5 males.

The median income for a household in the town was $33,438, and the median income for a family was $34,219. Males had a median income of $26,296 versus $20,833 for females. The per capita income for the town was $11,827. About 15.0% of families and 14.8% of the population were below the poverty line, including 16.1% of those under age 18 and none of those age 65 or over.

== Education ==
Wiggins is home to the Wiggins RE-50J school district. The district includes Wiggins Elementary School, Wiggins Middle School and Wiggins High School.

== See also ==
- Fort Morgan, CO Micropolitan Statistical Area
