= Hudson, Colorado =

Town in Colorado, United States

Town of Hudson
- Home rule municipality
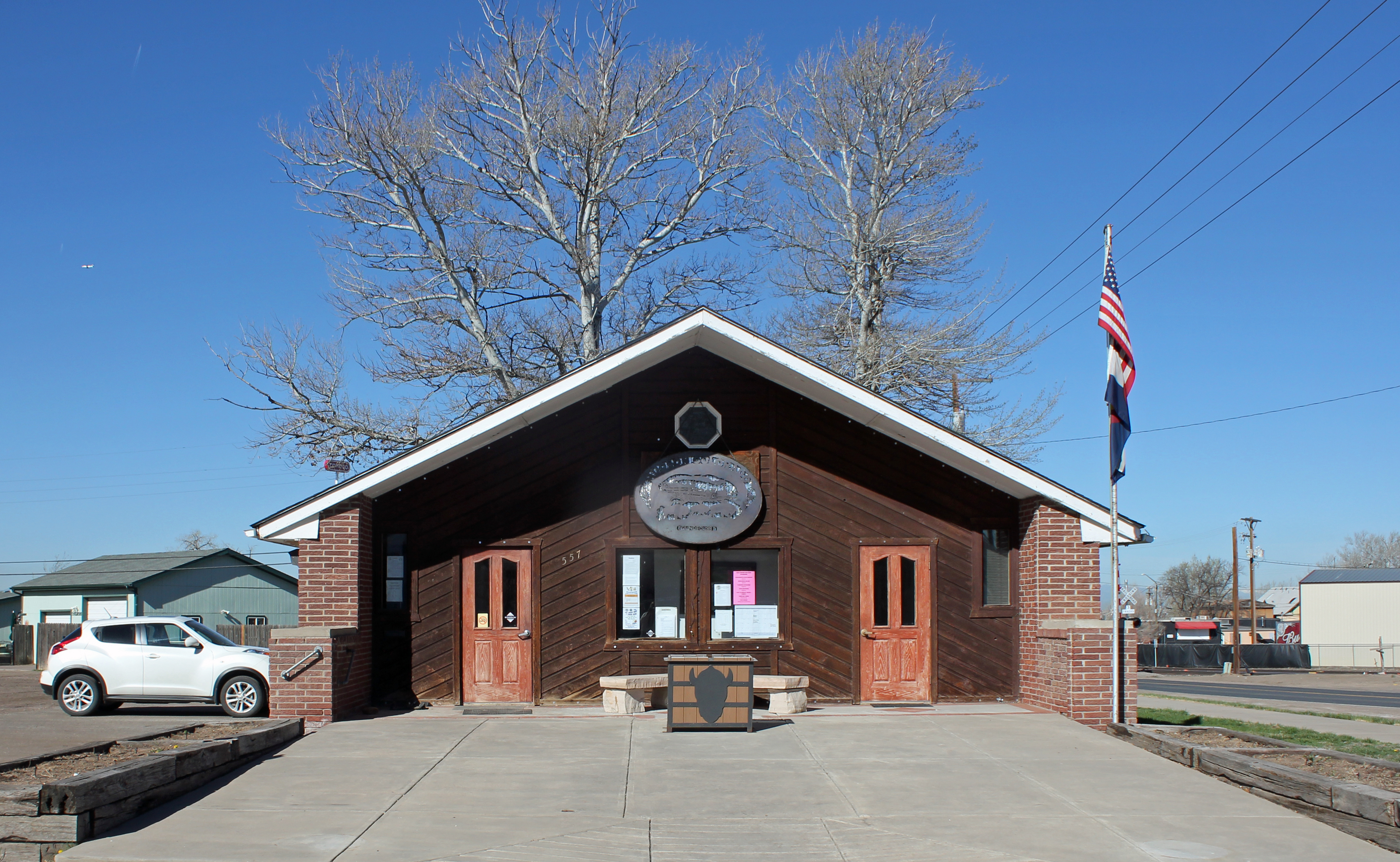
- The Hudson Town Hall.

- Location of Hudson in Weld County, Colorado.
- Coordinates: 40°04′34″N 104°37′22″W
- Country: United States
- State: Colorado
- County: Weld
- Incorporated (town): April 2, 1914

Government
  - Type: Statutory Town

Area
  - Total: 5.96 sq mi (15.43 km^{2})
  - Land: 5.88 sq mi (15.23 km^{2})
  - Water: 0.077 sq mi (0.20 km^{2})
- Elevation: 4,941 ft (1,506 m)

Population (2020)
  - Total: 1,651
  - Density: 280.8/sq mi (108.4/km^{2})
- Time zone: UTC-7 (MST)
  - Summer (DST): UTC-6 (MDT)
- ZIP code: 80642
- Area code: 303
- FIPS code: 08-37820
- GNIS feature ID: 2412776
- Website: Town of Hudson

The Town of Hudson is a home rule municipality in Weld County, Colorado, United States. The population was 1,651 at the 2020 census.

A post office called Hudson has been in operation since 1883. The town derives its name from the town company, Hudson City Land and Improvement Co.

== Geography ==
According to the United States Census Bureau, the town has a total area of 2.3 square miles (6.0 km^{2}), of which, 2.3 square miles (6.0 km^{2}) of it is land and 0.04 square miles (0.10 km^{2}) of it (0.85%) is water.

== Immigration Detention Center Controversy ==
In December 2025, the Trump administration contracted with The GEO Group to operate a dormant prison in Hudson as an immigrant detention center for at least six months, according to documents obtained by the American Civil Liberties Union of Colorado. In a February 24, 2026 letter to ICE Director Todd Lyons and Department of Homeland Security Secretary Kristi Noem, U.S. Rep. Brittany Pettersen and Sens. Michael Bennet and John Hickenlooper expressed “profound concern” about the contract.

The GEO Group issued a press release on July 13, 2026 announcing that it had signed a five-year contract with ICE to operate the 1,188-bed "Big Horn" facility in Hudson, and that it expected to generate $85 million in annual revenues in the contract's first year.

The proposal to operate the detention center sparked months of protest and a contentious July 15, 2026 town meeting at which speakers urged town leaders to prevent ICE from using the facility.

U.S. Rep. Petterson, other Democratic representatives, and Colorado's U.S. Senators wrote DHS and ICE officials on July 17, 2026 seeking answers about the facility, which they characterized as nearly doubling ICE's detention capacity in the state.

An immigrant rights group and a Colorado resident sued the town in state court on July 22, 2026 alleging that the use of the former prison as an ICE detention facility violated Hudson's zoning laws. The complaint asks the court to "[r]eview and set aside ... Hudson’s determination that it lacks authority to approve or deny the federal use" of the facility.

Two groups filed a second lawsuit on September 21, 2026, this one in the U.S. District Court for the District of Colorado, challenging ICE's compliance with federal environmental laws in approving the use and operation of the detention center.

On September 29, 2026, Colorado Attorney General Phil Weiser, on behalf of the State of Colorado, sued the Department of Homeland Security in U.S. District Court alleging the use of the Hudson site for a detention facility violated the National Environmental Policy Act, the Administrative Procedure Act, and the Immigration and Nationality Act. The State of Colorado also filed a motion for preliminary injunction to halt the project immediately.

== Demographics ==
Historical population
Census	Pop.	Note	%±
1920	322		—
1930	346		7.5%
1940	295		−14.7%
1950	365		23.7%
1960	430		17.8%
1970	518		20.5%
1980	698		34.7%
1990	918		31.5%
2000	1,565		70.5%
2010	2,356		50.5%
2020	1,651		−29.9%

=== 2020 census ===
As of the 2020 census, Hudson had a population of 1,651. The median age was 35.3 years. 23.9% of residents were under the age of 18 and 12.1% of residents were 65 years of age or older. For every 100 females there were 104.8 males, and for every 100 females age 18 and over there were 103.6 males age 18 and over.

0.0% of residents lived in urban areas, while 100.0% lived in rural areas.

There were 600 households in Hudson, of which 35.7% had children under the age of 18 living in them. Of all households, 50.5% were married-couple households, 23.7% were households with a male householder and no spouse or partner present, and 19.8% were households with a female householder and no spouse or partner present. About 23.3% of all households were made up of individuals and 8.2% had someone living alone who was 65 years of age or older.

There were 611 housing units, of which 1.8% were vacant. The homeowner vacancy rate was 0.7% and the rental vacancy rate was 0.7%.

Racial composition as of the 2020 census
Race	Number	Percent
White	1,180	71.5%
Black or African American	7	0.4%
American Indian and Alaska Native	14	0.8%
Asian	10	0.6%
Native Hawaiian and Other Pacific Islander	2	0.1%
Some other race	191	11.6%
Two or more races	247	15.0%
Hispanic or Latino (of any race)	550	33.3%
