= Orchard, Colorado =

Unincorporated community in Morgan County, CO, USA

- Census-designated place
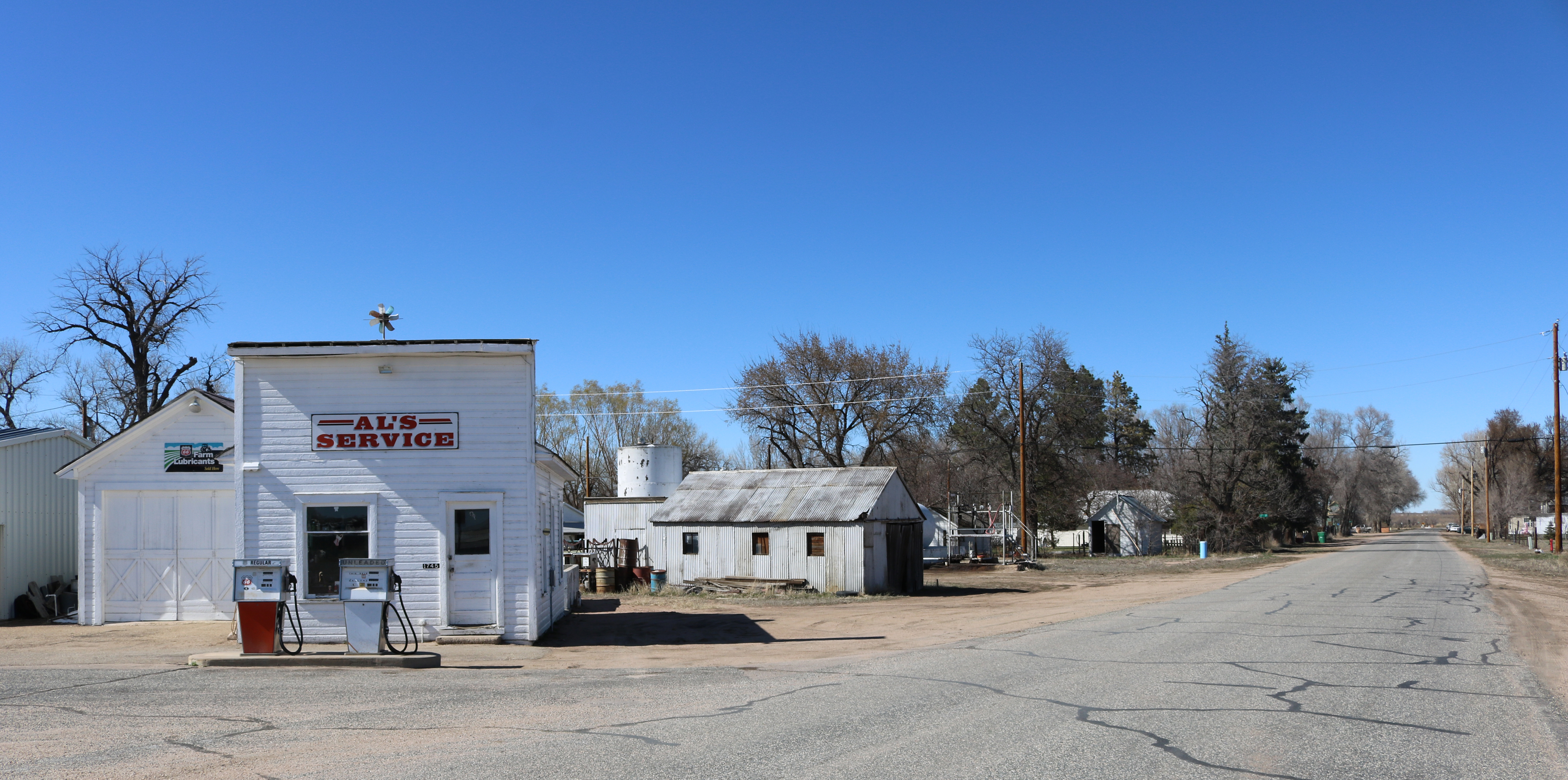
- Washington Avenue in Orchard

- Location in Morgan County, Colorado
- Coordinates: 40°19′55″N 104°07′04″W
- Country: United States
- State: Colorado
- County: Morgan

Government
  - Type: Unincorporated town

Area
  - Total: 0.160 sq mi (0.41 km^{2})
  - Land: 0.160 sq mi (0.41 km^{2})
  - Water: 0.0 sq mi (0 km^{2})
- Elevation: 4,410 ft (1,340 m)

Population (2020)
  - Total: 76
  - Density: 475/sq mi (183/km^{2})
- Time zone: UTC-7 (MST)
  - Summer (DST): UTC-6 (MDT)
- ZIP Code: 80649
- Area code: 970
- GNIS feature ID: 2583274

Orchard is an unincorporated town, a post office, and a census-designated place (CDP) located in and governed by Morgan County, Colorado, United States. The CDP is a part of the Fort Morgan, CO Micropolitan Statistical Area. The Orchard post office has the ZIP Code 80649. As of the 2020 census, the population of the Orchard CDP was 76.

== History ==
The Orchard post office has been in operation since 1882. The community was named for a grove of cottonwood trees near the original town site.

Orchard is the town that was used to film James Michener's miniseries Centennial. Most if not all of the remnants of the production sets are now gone. On August 2nd 2024 Orchard was renamed Centennial for one day in honor of the filming.

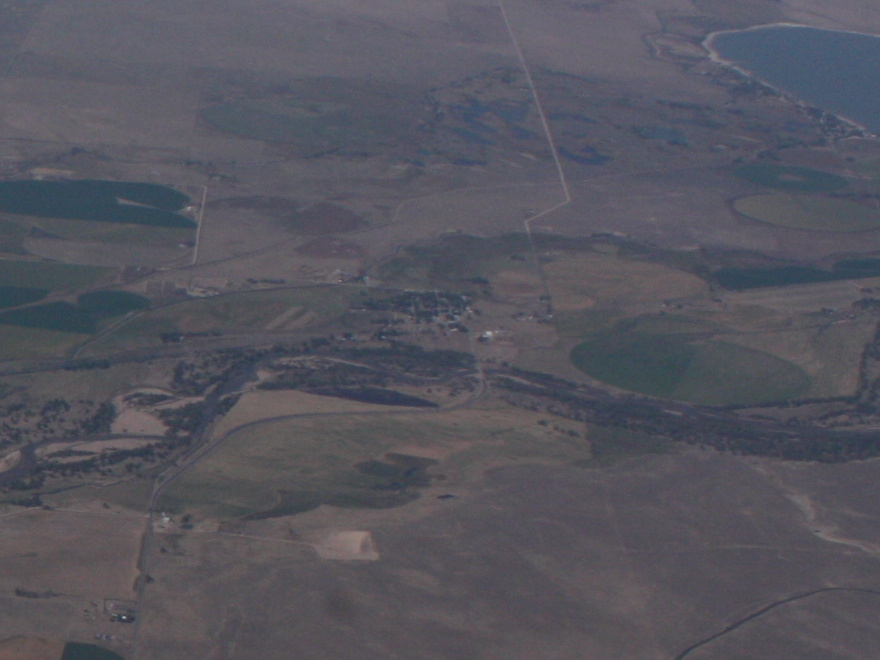
Oblique air photo of Orchard (center) with the South Platte River crossing from left to right, in September 2018

== Geography ==
Orchard is in western Morgan County along Colorado State Highway 144, north of the South Platte River. Highway 144 leads northeast, then southeast down the South Platte valley 23 miles (37 km) to Fort Morgan, the Morgan county seat, and south 4 miles (6 km) to U.S. Route 34. The Orchard CDP has an area of 0.16 square miles (0.41 km^{2}), all land.

== Demographics ==
The United States Census Bureau initially defined the Orchard CDP for the United States Census 2010.

Orchard CDP, Colorado
Year	Pop.	±%
2010	90	—
2020	76	−15.6%
Source: United States Census Bureau

== See also ==
- Fort Morgan Micropolitan Statistical Area
- Jackson Lake State Park
