= Colorado State Highway 79 =

State highway in Colorado, United States

State Highway 79
- Kiowa-Bennett Road; Converse Road
- SH 79 highlighted in red

Route information
- Maintained by CDOT
- Length: 23.76 mi (38.24 km)

Major junctions
- South end: I-70 / US 40 / US 287 / US 36 near Bennett
- SH 36 at Bennett
- North end: SH 52 at Prospect Valley

Location
- Country: United States
- State: Colorado
- Counties: Adams, Weld

Highway system
- Colorado State Highway System; Interstate; US; State; Scenic
← SH 78	→ SH 82

State Highway 79 (SH 79) is a 23.8 mi (38.3 km) long state highway in Adams and Weld counties in Colorado. The highway is also called "Kiowa–Bennett Road" and "Converse Road". It traverses through remote, open plain. The highway does not pass through any towns. It does service some subdivisions in the area. SH 79's southern terminus is at Interstate 70 (I-70), U.S. Route 36 (US 36), US 40 and US 287 south of Bennett, and the northern terminus is at SH 52 in Prospect Valley.

== Route description ==
The road begins at I-70, concurrent there with US 287, US 36 and US 40. It then heads northward into the town of Bennett, where it abruptly turns eastward and begins a short concurrency with SH 36. It then heads back northward slowly into a mass of rectangular fields, crossing the Adams–Weld county line. It continues northward in the same terrain, crossing numerous county roads, to its north end at SH 52.

== History ==
The road was established in the 1920s, when it connected Bennett to Prospect. SH 79 was extended to Elbert County in 1954. The following year, the extension was deleted. The road was entirely paved and extended again down to its current terminus at Interstate 70 in 1963.

== Major intersections ==
County	Location	mi	km	Destinations	Notes
Adams		0.00	0.00	I-70 / US 40 / US 287 / US 36	Southern terminus; I-70 exit 304; interchange
Adams	Bennett	1.24	2.00	SH 36 west – Watkins, Denver	South end of SH 36 overlap; Former US 36
Adams	Bennett	1.58	2.54	SH 36 east – Kiowa	North end of SH 36 overlap; Former US 36
Weld	Prospect Valley	23.89	38.45	SH 52 to I-76	Northern terminus
1.000 mi = 1.609 km; 1.000 km = 0.621 mi: Concurrency terminus
