= U.S. Route 36 in Colorado =

Section of U.S. Highway in Colorado, United States

U.S. Highway 36
- US 36 highlighted in red

Route information
- Maintained by CDOT
- Length: 232.406 mi (374.021 km) SH 36: 24.60 miles (39.59 km)
- Existed: 1926–present

Major junctions
- West end: US 34 near Estes Park
- Northwest Parkway / Interlocken Loop in Broomfield; US 287 in Westminster; I-25 / US 87 / I-270 in Welby; I-76 in Welby; US 6 / US 85 in Commerce City; I-70 / I-270 in Denver; I-225 in Denver; E-470 in Aurora; I-70 / US 40 / US 287 / SH 36 near Byers; US 385 near Idalia
- East end: US-36 at the Kansas state line near St. Francis, KS

Location
- Country: United States
- State: Colorado
- Counties: Larimer, Boulder, Broomfield, Jefferson, Denver, Adams, Arapahoe, Washington, Yuma

Highway system
- United States Numbered Highway System; List; Special; Divided; Colorado State Highway System; Interstate; US; State; Scenic
← SH 35	→ SH 39

U.S. Route 36 (US 36) is a United States highway that travels from Rocky Mountain National Park, Colorado to Kansas. In Colorado, the highway traverses an east–west route mostly in the northern portion of the Great Plains. At its west end, the road connects several small mountain towns such as Estes Park and Lyons to the larger metropolitan areas of Boulder and Denver. As it continues eastward, it connects to several other small towns and rural highways on the plains before crossing the state line into Kansas.

== Route description ==
=== Rocky Mountain National Park to Boulder ===
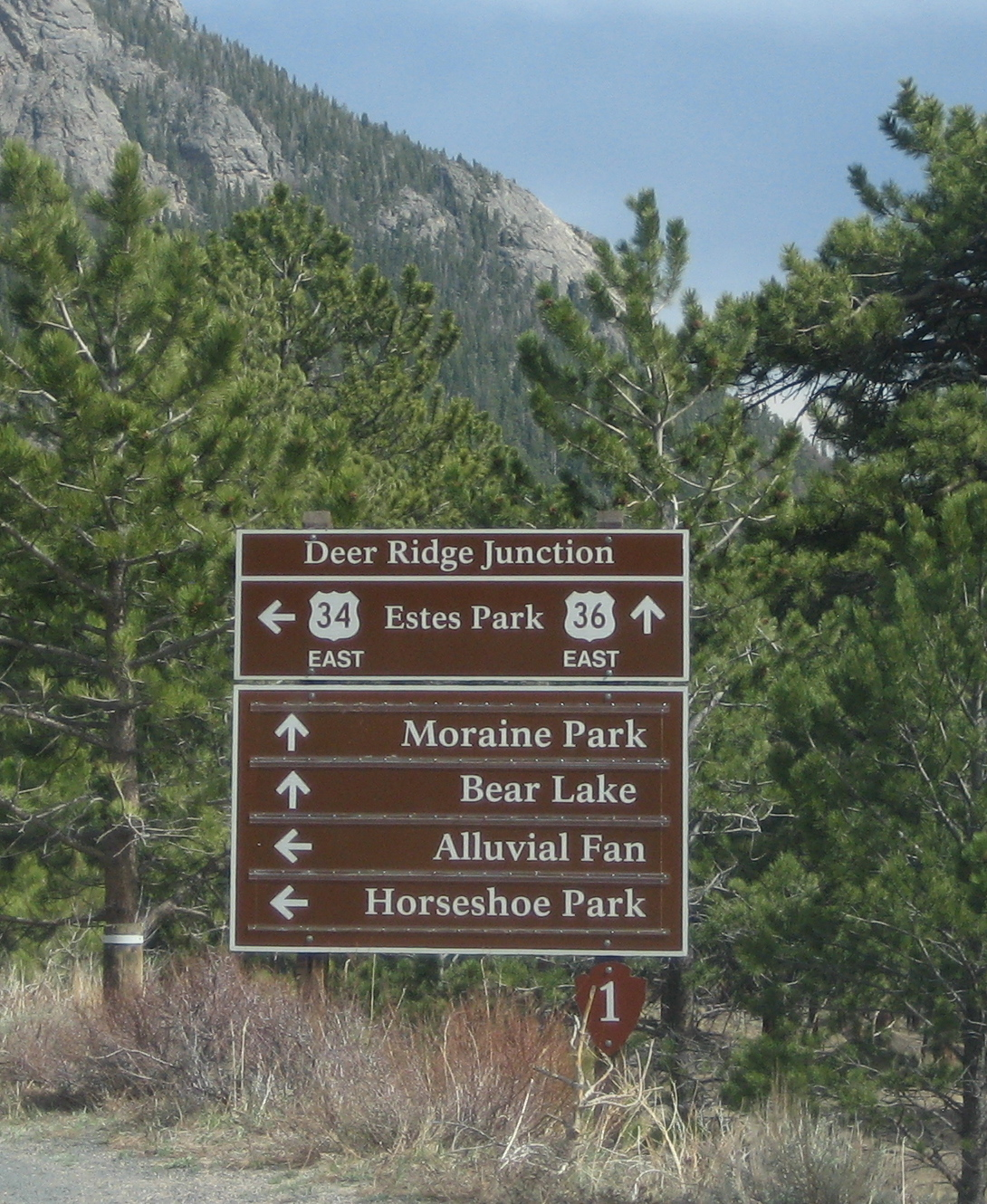
Sign on US 34 approaching the western endpoint of US 36 at Deer Ridge Junction in Rocky Mountain National Park

US 36 begins at Deer Ridge Junction in Rocky Mountain National Park, where it intersects US 34 (Trail Ridge Road) on the eastern slope of the Rocky Mountains. It exits the park at the Beaver Meadows Visitor Center and enters the town of Estes Park, where it is briefly overlapped with US 34 Business until it meets (but does not cross) the main US 34 again at an intersection shaped like the letter K. On its way out of Estes Park it intersects SH 7 at South St. Vrain Avenue, for the first of three times.

It then descends southeast through North St. Vrain Canyon to the town of Lyons, which it enters on Main Street. At 5th Avenue in Lyons, it intersects SH 7 again, beginning an overlap to Boulder which is signed only as US 36. At 5th Avenue and Main Street in Lyons, it divides into a pair of one-way streets with the eastbound direction traveling one block south on 5th Avenue and turning east onto Broadway Street, and the westbound direction using Main Street. The two directions reunite in two blocks and leave Lyons southeastward as four-lane Ute Highway. Just outside Lyons, US 36 turns south at a signalized intersection onto two-lane North Foothills Highway, while SH 66 continues east to Longmont. From Lyons to Boulder, US 36 pretty much traces the edge of the foothills.

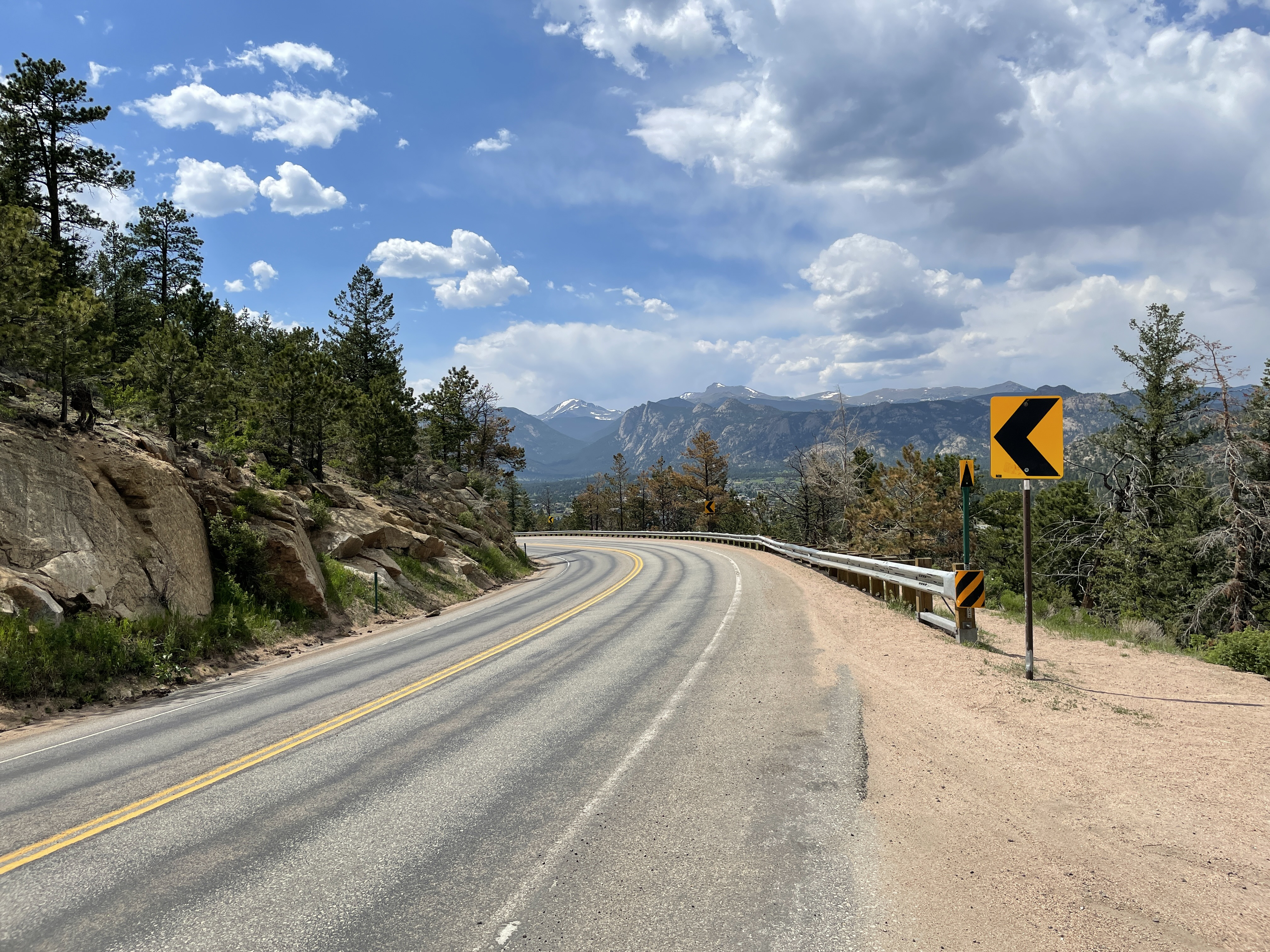
US 36 westbound approaching Estes Park

US 36 enters Boulder on four-lane-wide 28th Street, where it serves the city's main shopping area. On the north side of Boulder, it intersects SH 119 at Diagonal Highway, beginning a 1.4-mile (2.3 km) overlap that extends until SH 119 turns west onto Canyon Boulevard towards Nederland. One block farther south, SH 7 diverges from its overlap with US 36 by turning east onto Arapahoe Avenue. Leaving the Boulder shopping district, US 36 crosses Boulder Creek and passes through the University of Colorado campus area as an expressway to the interchange with Baseline Road, where it meets Spur US 36, a two-block long connector along 27th Way to SH 93, signed only as "To SH 93" and "To US 36".

=== Boulder to Denver ===
Just after the Baseline Road interchange, US 36 changes to a southeasterly direction, using the route of the original Denver-Boulder Turnpike, a toll road from its opening in 1952 until 1967. The road intersects SH 157 (Foothills Parkway) on its way out of Boulder. Northwestbound traffic approaching Boulder on the turnpike can stop at the Davidson Mesa Overlook, a scenic overlook providing a panoramic view of the Front Range mountains, the City of Boulder, and its famous Flatirons rock formation; a monument to the Denver-Boulder Turnpike's original builders is also located here. Continuing southeast, the road enters the fast-growing Denver suburbs of Broomfield and Westminster, which have become popular locations for High-Tech businesses, which can be seen lining the turnpike. An interchange at 96th Street provides access to the Northwest Parkway and thereby to the E-470 outer beltway around Denver. At an interchange with SH 121 and SH 128 in Broomfield, it meets (but does not cross) US 287. It then has another interchange with US 287 again at Federal Boulevard near 76th Avenue in Westminster. The interchange at 76th and Federal was the terminus of the original Denver-Boulder Turnpike when it was still a toll road, but in common parlance the Denver-Boulder Turnpike now extends all the way east to I-25.

The US 36 bikeway, part of the multi-modal Fastracks US 36 Express Lanes Project, mostly parallels the road between Table Mesa Drive in Boulder and 80th Avenue in Westminster, the first 11-mile stretch between Westminster and Louisville/Superior opening on Bike-to-Work Day in June 2015, the full route to Table Mesa in Boulder in March 2016.

=== Denver to Byers (unsigned) ===
At the very complicated junction of US 36, I-25, I-76, and I-270, US 36 emerges overlapped and unsigned with I-270, and continues overlapped and unsigned with I-70 when I-270 ends near the former Stapleton Airport site. At Colfax Avenue, this I-70/US 36 overlap is also joined by US 287 (the third time the two highways come into proximity) and US 40. From the interchange with Colfax Avenue, the road continues to Watkins and then to Byers, unsigned in its four-way overlap with I-70, US 40, and US 287.

=== Byers to Kansas state line ===
At Byers, US 36 heads eastward on its own as a separate rural highway, while the I-70/US 40/US 287 overlap curves to the southeast. US 36 passes through several very small settlements including Last Chance, Lindon, Anton, and Cope in Washington County and Joes and Idalia in Yuma County. Many of the towns on this desolate 105-mile (169 km) section of highway are so small that they do not provide basic traveler services such as gasoline, and signs caution winter drivers that there is no snowplowing at night. At Cope, it is joined by SH 59 for about 6 miles (9.7 km). In Yuma County, near Idalia, it jogs north, becoming concurrent with US 385 for about 3 miles (4.8 km) before turning east again and continuing about 10 miles (16 km) to the Kansas border.

== Tolls ==
=== Denver-Boulder Turnpike ===
The Denver-Boulder Turnpike was championed by business and university interests in Boulder due to there being no direct route between Denver and Boulder. The 17.3-mile (27.8 km) toll road stretched from Federal Boulevard (US 287) in Westminster to Baseline Road in Boulder, and opened on January 19, 1952, with a toll of $0.25. The Valley Highway from downtown Denver opened between 1952 and 1954, feeding directly into the turnpike. Most of the new highway carried SH 185 (US 87), but traffic continuing north on that route initially had to exit at 70th Avenue (now SH 224), with the remainder of the route to Federal Boulevard becoming a realignment of SH 382. When the bonds for the Turnpike were paid off ahead of time in 1967, tolls were removed.

=== Express lanes ===
Beginning in July 2012, the Colorado Department of Transportation built a high-occupancy toll lane (HOT lane) in each direction between Federal Boulevard and 88th Street in Louisville, Colorado. Phase 1 of the project, costing $497 million, opened in summer 2015. High-occupancy vehicles and buses like RTD's Flatiron Flyer travel free in the HOT lanes, while single-occupancy vehicles must pay between $1.25 to $7.60, depending on time of day, or up to $13.68 without an electronic toll collection pass. To accommodate the lanes, several bridges were replaced and shoulders were widened along the highway. Phase 2 of the project, anticipated to be complete by early 2016, will extend the HOT lanes from 88th Street to Table Mesa Drive in Boulder, Colorado, through a public–private partnership.

== History ==
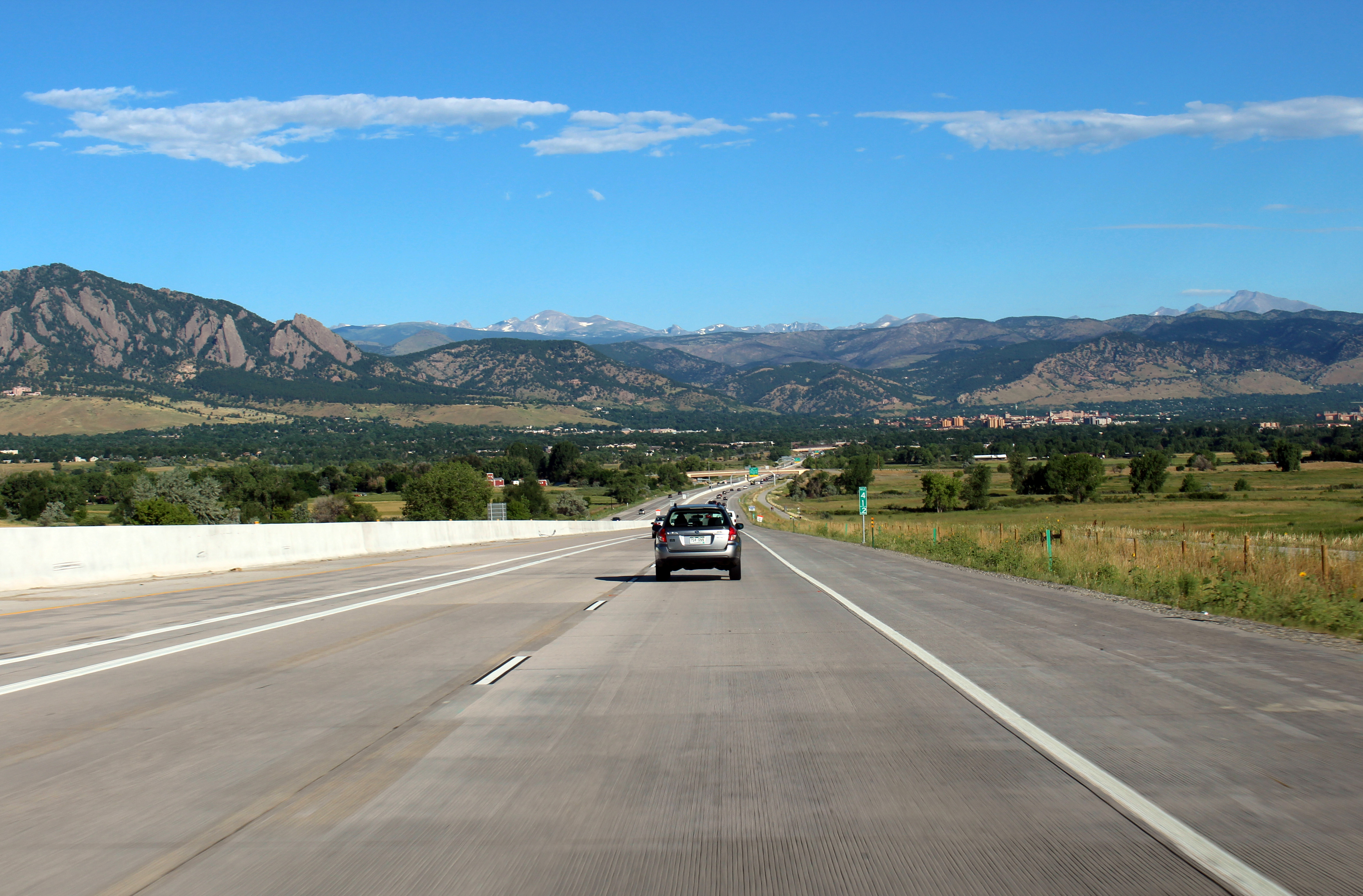
The view of Boulder from westbound US 36 as the highway descends into the city

The road from Strasburg east to the Kansas state line was added to the state highway system in 1922 as the Colorado part of a proposed "Kansas City-Denver Airline Highway" that would have cut 72 miles (116 km) from the existing highways between Denver and Kansas City. The planned route followed present U.S. Route 36 in Kansas to Mankato, but then turned southeasterly via Concordia and Clay Center to Manhattan, where it met the Victory Highway (now US 24 and US 40). The new state highway was assigned the Primary Road No. 102 designation, and kept its number when many others were changed in 1923.

The west end of State Highway 102 was initially at Strasburg, but by 1924 it had been shifted to Byers, using the present County Roads 10 and 197 to return to current US 36. In 1927–1929 the entire SH 102 became part of US 36, which was realigned to go west rather than southwest from Norton, Kansas. The west end was moved back to Strasburg in 1932–1934, and a number of right-angle turns were eliminated by constructing diagonal cutoffs west of Cope and at the state line in 1934–1935. US 36 was extended west in 1936–1937 as an overlap with US 40 on Colfax Avenue to downtown Denver, where it would end for the next 30 years. Paving began in 1937–1939 and was completed in 1947–1949, including a realignment off County Roads DD and 12 north of Idalia. The junction with US 40 near Strasburg-Byers was changed again in 1954–1955, now following County Road 181 east of Byers. Finally in 1958–1959 a realignment west of Idalia eliminated four more 90-degree turns.

When the tolls were removed from the Denver-Boulder Turnpike, the road became State Highway 49, which also replaced all of SH 382. US 36 was also extended at this time, following the Valley Highway (by then part of I-25) from Colfax Avenue north to SH 49, and then overlapping SH 49 to the end at Baseline Road, SH 119 on 28th Street, SH 7 to Lyons, and SH 66 to end at US 34 in Estes Park. Late in 1968 these redundant state highway designations were dropped, resulting in the elimination of SH 49 and SH 102, realignment of SH 119 to go more directly in Boulder, and creation of gaps on SH 7 and SH 66. In 2012, the turnpike was also given the honorary name Buffalo Highway in recognition of the University of Colorado's mascot, though this name has not achieved common use.

Returning to Colfax Avenue east of Denver, the first part of I-70 in that area opened in 1961–1962, bypassing Watkins and Bennett and carrying US 36 (and US 40/US 287). The freeway was extended east past Strasburg and Byers in 1963–1964, including the final realignment of US 36 northeast of Byers. The old alignment was initially removed from the state highway system, but in 1964–1965 it returned as part of SH 8. When this route was largely eliminated in late 1968, this bypassed highway instead became State Highway 36 (and SH 40 east of Byers), with US 36 remaining on I-70. US 36 was realigned through Denver in 1970, following I-70 and I-270 north of downtown. (Note that, until 2000, I-270 ended at I-76, and US 36 traffic had to use short pieces of I-76 and I-25.) A final westerly extension came in 1977–1978, when US 36 replaced the western segment of SH 66 (except for a spur) from Estes Park into Rocky Mountain National Park and another junction with US 34.

In early September 2013, a 31-mile (50 km) section of US 36 from Estes Park to Boulder was closed due to damage from the 2013 Colorado floods. For a time, the only route available in and out of Estes Park was a long detour through Nederland, Blackhawk, and Golden. The section in North St. Vrain Canyon west of Lyons was especially heavily damaged. The road was finally reopened two months later with the help of the National Guard. Permanent repairs were started in January, 2014.

In July 2019, cracks appeared on the eastbound lanes of the highway in Westminster due to shifting soil underneath. The highway has been closed as construction crews try to address the problem.

== Major junctions ==
The mileposts in Larimer County temporarily reset at the concurrency with US 34. All exits are unnumbered.

County	Location	mi	km	Destinations	Notes
Larimer	Deer Ridge Junction	0.000	0.000	US 34 (Trail Ridge Road) – Grand Lake, Horseshoe Park, Estes Park, Rocky Mountain National Park	Western terminus
Larimer	Rocky Mountain National Park	2.900	4.667	Bear Lake Road – Moraine Park, Glacier Basin, Bear Lake	
Larimer	Rocky Mountain National Park	3.089	4.971	Beaver Meadows Entrance Station; Rocky Mountain National Park entrance fee required	
Larimer	Rocky Mountain National Park	4.959	7.981	Highway 66 – YMCA Center	Former SH 66
Larimer	Estes Park	6.982 1.306	11.236 2.102	US 34 Bus. west (Elkhorn Avenue)	Western end of US 34 Bus. concurrency
Larimer	Estes Park	1.690 0.000	2.720 0.000	US 34 (Wonderview Avenue / Big Thompson Avenue) / US 34 Bus. ends – Grand Lake, Loveland, Greeley	Eastern end of US 34 Bus. concurrency
Larimer	Estes Park	0.395	0.636	SH 7 south (South St. Vrain Avenue) – Allenspark	
Boulder	Lyons	20.357	32.761	SH 7 west (5th Avenue) – Allenspark	Western end of SH 7 concurrency
Boulder		21.764	35.026	SH 66 east – Longmont	Western terminus of SH 66
Boulder	Boulder	35.005	56.335	SH 119 north (Diagonal Highway) – Longmont	Western end of SH 119 concurrency
Boulder	Boulder	36.342	58.487	SH 119 south (Canyon Boulevard) – Nederland, Eldora Ski Area, Pearl Street Mall, Business District	Eastern end of SH 119 concurrency
Boulder	Boulder	36.533	58.794	SH 7 east (Arapahoe Avenue) – Lafayette	Eastern end of SH 7 concurrency
Boulder	Boulder	37.601	60.513	To SH 93 / Baseline Road	West end of Denver-Boulder Turnpike
Boulder	Boulder	39.198	63.083	SH 157 north (Foothills Parkway) / Table Mesa Drive / South Boulder Road – CU Stadium	
Boulder	Louisville–Superior line	43.198	69.520	SH 170 west / McCaslin Boulevard – Superior, Louisville	Eastern terminus of SH-170; diverging diamond interchange opened Oct. 19, 2015
City and County of Broomfield		45.3	72.9	West Flatiron Crossing Drive	Eastbound exit and westbound entrance
City and County of Broomfield		45.825	73.748	Northwest Parkway east / Interlocken Loop – Broomfield, Louisville	Western terminus of Northwest Parkway; access to Denver International Airport
City and County of Broomfield		46.194	74.342	East Flatiron Crossing Drive	Westbound exit and eastbound entrance
City and County of Broomfield		48.035	77.305	US 287 / SH 121 – Broomfield, Arvada, Lafayette	
Jefferson	Westminster	50.378	81.076	104th Avenue / Church Ranch Boulevard	
Adams	Westminster	52.571	84.605	SH 95 (Sheridan Boulevard) / 92nd Avenue	
Adams	Westminster	54.858	88.285	US 287 (Federal Boulevard)	
Adams		55.931	90.012	Pecos Street	
Adams		55.956	90.052	I-25 Express south	Eastbound exit and westbound entrance
Adams		56.993	91.721	SH 224 east (Broadway) to SH 53	No eastbound entrance
Adams		57.418	92.405	I-25 south (US 87 south) – Denver	Eastbound exit and westbound entrance
Adams		57.418	92.405	I-270 begins	East end of Denver-Boulder Turnpike; western end of I-270 concurrency
Adams	See I-270				
Adams				I-70 west / I-270 ends	Eastern end of I-270 concurrency; western end of I-70 concurrency; westbound exit and eastbound entrance; I-70 exit 279A
See I-70
Arapahoe	Byers	100.998	162.541	I-70 east (US 40 east / US 287 south) / SH 36 west – Byers	East end of SH 36; eastern end of I-70/US/40/US 287 concurrency; I-70 exit 316
Washington	Last Chance	135.583	218.200	SH 71 – Brush, Limon	
Washington	Anton	155.614	250.436	SH 63 north – Akron, Arriba	
Washington		178.048	286.540	SH 59 south to I-70	Western end of SH 59 concurrency
Yuma		185.382	298.343	SH 59 north – Haxtun, Yuma	Eastern end of SH 59 concurrency
Yuma		211.109	339.747	US 385 south – Burlington	Western end of US 385 concurrency
Yuma		213.654	343.843	US 385 north – Wray	Eastern end of US 385 concurrency
Yuma		224.718	361.649	US-36 east – St. Francis	Kansas state line
1.000 mi = 1.609 km; 1.000 km = 0.621 mi: Concurrency terminus; HOV only; Incomplete access; Tolled

== State Highway 36 ==
State Highway 36
- Location: Aurora–Byers

State Highway 36 (SH 36) is the stretch of former US 36 that runs from Aurora to Byers. Its western terminus is at exit 292 of I-70. Form there, it goes east through Watkins, Bennett, and Strasburg, meeting I-70 twice along the way before meeting I-70 for a third time at its eastern terminus (exit 316). This first junction with I-70 east of Aurora is in Bennett, at exit 306. The second such junction is at an underpass near Strasburg, with no access to or from the Interstate.

The highway was originally signed as part of SH 8.

Major intersections
Mileposts are based on US 36 mileage.

County	Location	mi	km	Destinations	Notes
Adams	Aurora	76.394	122.944	I-70 (US 36 / US 40 / US 287)	Western terminus; I-70 exit 292
Adams	Watkins	79.730	128.313	Watkins Road (I-70 BS south) to I-70	Northern terminus of I-70 Bus.
Adams	Bennett	88.836	142.968	SH 79 south (1st Street) to I-70	Western end of SH 79 concurrency
Adams	Bennett	89.210	143.570	SH 79 north (Adams Street) – Prospect Valley	Eastern end of SH 79 concurrency
Adams–Arapahoe county line	Bennett	91.188	146.753	I-70 – Denver	No access to I-70 east; I-70 exit 306
Arapahoe	Strasburg	95.000	152.888	To I-70 / Wagner Street	
Arapahoe	Byers	100.937	162.442	SH 40 east	Former US 40 east
Arapahoe	Byers	100.998	162.541	I-70 (US 40 / US 287) / US 36	Eastern terminus; I-70 exit 316; highway continues as US 36 east.
1.000 mi = 1.609 km; 1.000 km = 0.621 mi: Concurrency terminus; Incomplete access

U.S. Route 36
Previous state: Terminus	Colorado	Next state: Kansas
