= Colorado State Highway 66 =

State highway in Colorado, United States

State Highway 66
- SH 66 highlighted in red

Route information
- Maintained by CDOT
- Length: 22.7 mi (36.5 km)

Major junctions
- West end: US 36 / SH 7 southeast of Lyons
- US 287 in Longmont; I-25 / US 87 near Longmont
- East end: US 85 in Platteville

Location
- Country: United States
- State: Colorado
- Counties: Boulder, Weld

Highway system
- Colorado State Highway System; Interstate; US; State; Scenic
← SH 65	→ SH 67

State Highway 66 (SH 66) is a 22.7 mi (36.5 km) long east-west state highway in Boulder and Weld counties in Colorado. The highway extends from the foothills of the Rocky Mountains at a junction with U.S. Route 36 (US 36) and SH 7 southeast of Lyons, proceeding east through the northern edge of Longmont, to Platteville where it ends at US 85. Although a number of western states retain their "state highway 66" as the decommissioned US 66, the "Mother Road" did not run through Colorado, and SH 66 has no connection to the famed Historic Route 66.

== Route description ==
Modern SH 66 begins as a continuation of Ute Highway, southeast of Lyons at a signalized T intersection where US 36 turns south towards Boulder on North Foothills Highway. From here, the route heads eastward along Ute Highway through open grassland, passing several small reservoirs and streams. Near a junction with CR 37, the road passes McCall Reservoir, Independent Reservoir, and Burch Lake before passing by McIntosh Lake. It passes through the northern edge of Longmont, where it meets US 287. Continuing eastward, the land on the side of the road transitions to farmland. After crossing the Boulder/Weld county line, the road heads east in a straight line, crossing Interstate 25 (I-25) at Exit 243 near Mead, continuing on to Plattville which it enters on Justin Avenue, crossing Business US 85 at Main Street before ending at US 85.

== History ==
The route was established in the 1920s, when it began at US 87 (now moved) in Longmont and headed west to Estes Park. The section east of Longmont, which now extends to Platteville, was added in 1939, when the older portion of the route was paved. The rest of the route was paved by 1960. In 1967 when the bonds for the Denver-Boulder Turnpike were paid off, US 36 was extended to Estes Park along SH 66. Gradually the signing of the overlapping segment was reduced to just "US 36", leaving an orphan segment of SH 66 signed within Estes Park. In 2007 this remnant of SH 66 in Estes Park was turned back and it was truncated to its junction with US 36 southeast of Lyons. However, even today mileposts are measured from Estes Park, with the road officially beginning at Milepost 26.89.

== Major intersections ==
County	Location	mi	km	Destinations	Notes
Boulder	Lyons	28.69	46.17	US 36 / SH 7 – Estes Park, Boulder	Western terminus; end of overlapping non-chargeable section
Boulder	Longmont	36.62	58.93	US 287 – Loveland, Longmont	
Weld	Mead	42.73	68.77	I-25 / US 87	Interchange; I-25 exit 243
Weld	Platteville	51.23	82.45	US 85 Bus. (Main Street) – Business District	
Weld	Platteville	51.38	82.69	US 85 – Evans, Greeley, Fort Lupton, Brighton	Eastern terminus
1.000 mi = 1.609 km; 1.000 km = 0.621 mi
