= Colorado State Highway 7 =

State highway in Colorado, United States

State Highway 7
- SH 7 highlighted in red

Route information
- Maintained by CDOT
- Length: 81.64 mi (131.39 km)

Major junctions
- West end: US 36 in Estes Park
- US 36 in Lyons and in Boulder; I-25 / US 87 in Broomfield
- East end: I-76 / US 6 in Brighton

Location
- Country: United States
- State: Colorado
- Counties: Larimer, Boulder, Weld, Broomfield, Adams

Highway system
- Colorado State Highway System; Interstate; US; State; Scenic
← US 6	→ SH 8

State Highway 7 (SH 7) is an 81.64-mile (131.39 km) state highway in Colorado, United States. It is located in the north-central portion of the state, traversing the mountains on the east of the continental divide south of Estes Park as well as portions of the Colorado Piedmont north of Denver. The northwestern segment of the highway is part of the Peak to Peak Scenic Byway and furnishes an access route to Estes Park, Colorado and Rocky Mountain National Park. In its southeast portion it skirts the northern end of the Denver Metropolitan Area, providing an access route connecting Boulder, Lafayette and Brighton with Interstate 25 (I-25) and Interstate 76 (I-76).

The western terminus is at the junction of U.S. Route 36 at North St. Vrain and South St. Vrain avenues in Estes Park. The eastern terminus is at I-76 exit 25 in Brighton. The portion between Lyons and Boulder, where it is concurrent with US 36, is unsigned. The highway is two lanes along the entire route except for portions in the cities and towns.

== Route description ==
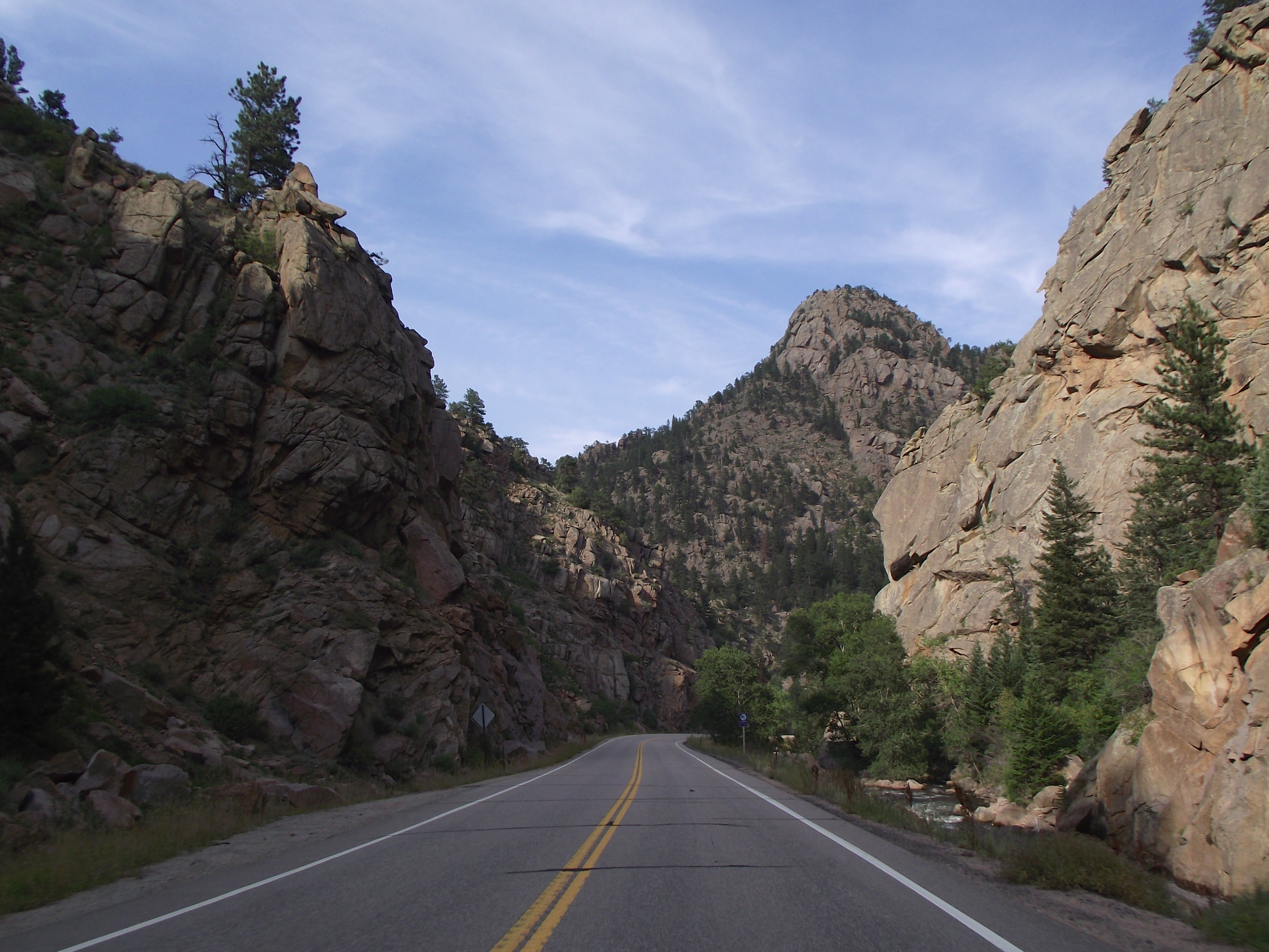
SS 7 in south St. Vrain Canyon, near Lyons, July 2012.

From Estes Park, SH 7 climbs into the mountains of southwest Larimer County and skirts the east side of Rocky Mountain National Park, providing the closest vehicle approach to the popular trailhead to the summit of Longs Peak. Near the community of Raymond it intersects State Highway 72, which takes the Peak to Peak Scenic Byway designation with it to the south, while SH 7 turns to the east and follows South St. Vrain Creek downstream onto the piedmont at Lyons, where it intersects US 36. South of Lyons it is concurrent with US 36 along the base of the foothills to Boulder. (This section is signed only as US 36.) It is also concurrent with State Highway 119 on 28th Street within Boulder. It runs straight east from Boulder as the extension of Arapahoe Avenue to U.S. Route 287 (US 287) north of Lafayette, jogging one mile (1.6 km) to the south while concurrent with US 287, then going due east again, as Baseline Road, to I-25. East of I-25 it jogs one mile (1.6 km) south, then due east as 160th Avenue (part of the Greater Denver street numbering system) through Brighton to I-76 in the eastern part of Brighton.

== History ==
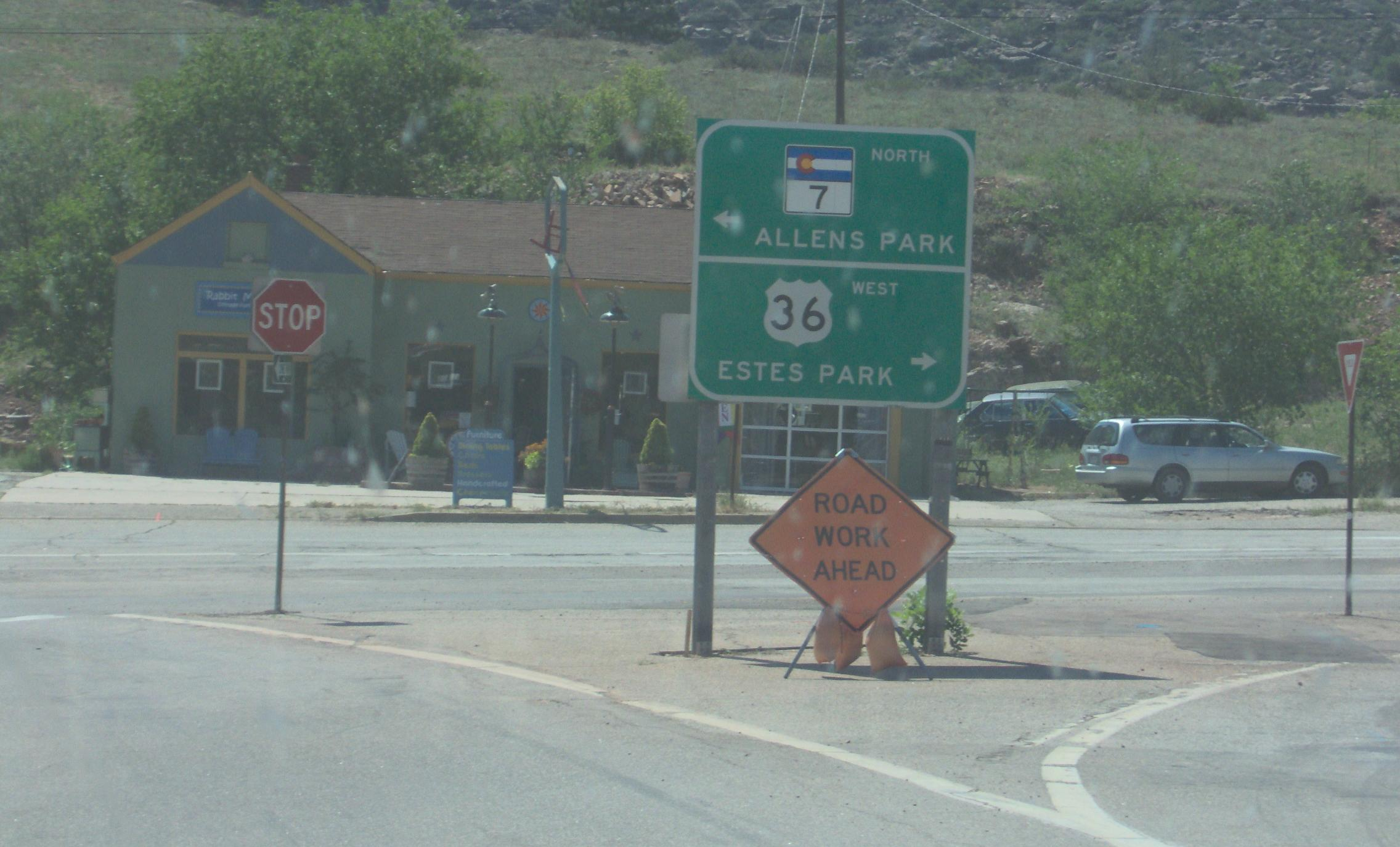
Junction of SH 7 and U.S. Route 36 in Lyons, July 2006

The route was established in the 1920s. It began at Estes Park and traveled south to Lyons, then south to Boulder. It then continued to its terminus at U.S. Route 87 (now also I-25) east of Lafayette. The route was paved from Boulder to Lafayette in 1932 and from Estes Park to Lyons in 1936. In 1939, the route was extended southeast to Brighton, where it met U.S. Route 6; this extension was paved by 1946. In 2006, the section on Broadway between US 36 and Canyon Boulevard in Boulder was turned back to the City of Boulder, and SH 7 was rerouted to be concurrent (unsigned) with US 36 on 28th Street through Boulder.

== Major intersections ==
County	Location	mi	km	Destinations	Notes
Larimer	Estes Park	0.00	0.00	US 36 east (North St. Vrain Avenue) – Lyons, Boulder US 36 west (North St. Vrain Avenue) – Rocky Mountain National Park	Western terminus; T intersection
Boulder	Allenspark	14.91	24.00	SH 7 Bus. east	Western end of SH 7 Bus.
Boulder		16.08	25.88	SH 7 Bus. west	Eastern end of SH 7 Bus.
Boulder		19.24	30.96	SH 72 south (Peak to Peak Highway) – Ward, Nederland	Northern end of SH 72
Boulder	Lyons	32.99	53.09	US 36 west (West Main Street) – Estes Park	Western end of (unsigned) US 36 concurrency; (SH 7 is unsigned along US 36 concurrency)
Boulder		34.49	55.51	SH 66 east (North Foothills Highway) – Longmont, Platteville	Western end of SH 66
Boulder	Boulder	50.89	81.90	SH 119 north (Diagonal Highway) – SH 157, Longmont	Western end of SH 119 concurrency
Boulder	Boulder	52.29	84.15	SH 119 south (Canyon Boulevard) – Nederland	Eastern end of SH 119 concurrency
Boulder	Boulder	52.48	84.46	US 36 east (28th Street) – SH 157, Broomfield, Denver	Eastern end of US 36 concurrency; (SH 7 is unsigned along US 36 concurrency)
Boulder	Boulder	53.45	86.02	SH 157 north (Foothills Parkway) – SH 119 SH 157 south (Foothills Parkway) – US 36	
Boulder	Lafayette	59.29	95.42	SH 42 south (North 9th Street) – Louisville	Northern end of SH 42
Boulder	Lafayette	60.68	97.65	US 287 north – Longmont, Loveland	Eastern end of US 287 concurrency
Boulder	Lafayette	61.87	99.57	US 287 south – Broomfield	Western end of US 287 concurrency
City and County of Broomfield		68.38	110.05	I-25 north (Dwight D. Eisenhower Highway) / US 87 north – Fort Collins, Cheyenne (Wyoming) I-25 south (Dwight D. Eisenhower Highway) / US 87 south – Denver	I-25 exit 229; diamond interchange
Adams	Brighton	76.98	123.89	US 85 north (CanAm Highway) – Fort Lupton, Greeley US 85 south (CanAm Highway) – Denver, Colorado Springs	
Adams	Brighton	77.29	124.39	North 4th Avenue (north); South 4th Avenue (south) – I-76/US 6, Denver	South 4th Avenue formerly SH 2
Adams	Brighton	81.64	131.39	Frontage Road to / I-76 / US 6 – Denver, Sterling	Eastern terminus
Adams	Brighton	81.64	131.39	East Bridge Street/East 160th Avenue	Continuation east beyond eastern terminus
1.000 mi = 1.609 km; 1.000 km = 0.621 mi: Concurrency terminus; Incomplete access

== Business route ==
State Highway 7 Business
- Location: Boulder County
- Length: 1.592 mi (2.562 km)

Colorado State Highway 7 Business (SH 7 Bus.) is a 1.592-mile (2.562 km) east–west state highway business route in Boulder County, Colorado, United States. SH 7 Bus.'s western terminus is at SH 7 in Allenspark, and the eastern terminus is at SH 7 east of Allenspark.

The entire route is in Boulder County.

Location	mi	km	Destinations	Notes
Allenspark	0.000	0.000	SH 7	Western terminus
	1.592	2.562	SH 7	Eastern terminus
1.000 mi = 1.609 km; 1.000 km = 0.621 mi

== See also ==
- List of state highways in Colorado
