= County Line Road =

County Line Road may mean:

A road:

- County Line Road (Santa Clara–Stanislaus counties, California)
- Baseline Road (Colorado) also known as County Line Road (Adams-Weld)
- Florida State Road 852
