= Baseline Road (Colorado) =

Road in Colorado following the 40th parallel north

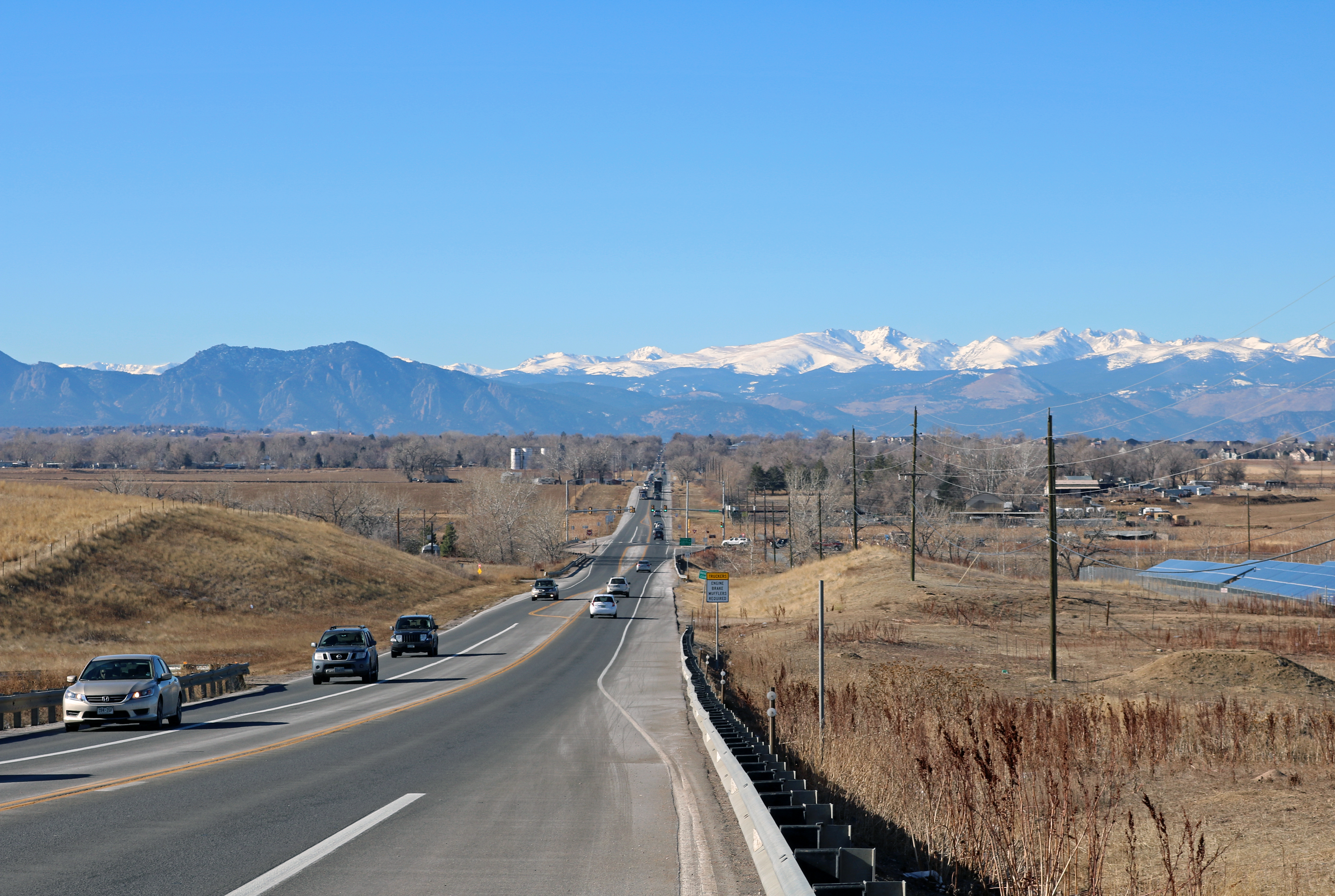
Looking west along Baseline Road from Airport Road in Erie.

Baseline Road is a major east-west street in Boulder, Colorado that extends east of the city through parts of four counties. The western terminus of Baseline Road is at Flagstaff Mountain in the City of Boulder Mountain Parks. The eastern terminus is at 16800 Watkins Road, about 6 miles (9.7 km) east of Lochbuie on the boundary between Adams and Weld Counties. The total length of Baseline Road is approximately 38 miles (61 km), all of which is within the Denver-Aurora-Boulder Combined Statistical Area in Colorado. Baseline Road runs almost exactly along the 40th line of latitude.

== Origin of the name ==
On May 30, 1854, the Kansas-Nebraska Act created the Kansas Territory and the Nebraska Territory, divided by the 40th parallel north. The Pike's Peak Gold Rush of 1858-1861 lured thousands of gold seekers into the goldfields of the northwestern Kansas Territory and the southwestern Nebraska Territory. On February 28, 1861, the western portion of the Kansas Territory and the southwestern portion of the Nebraska Territory were incorporated into the new Colorado Territory. The 40th parallel became the primary baseline for surveying the land in the eastern portion of the new territory, and a road was eventually cut along the survey baseline.

== Official names for the road ==
The road along the 40th parallel is officially named Baseline Road in Boulder County and the City and County of Broomfield, 168th Avenue in Adams County, and County Line Road or Weld County Road 2 in Weld County.

A 7-mile (11 km) stretch of Baseline Road, from US 287 in Lafayette to I-25 in Broomfield, is part of State Highway 7.

== Description ==
Baseline Road descends from Flagstaff Mountain (site of the 1935 CCC Sunrise Amphitheatre) and runs through the city of Boulder for its first four miles (6 km). Within Boulder, it passes the Colorado Chautauqua, a National Historic Landmark, near 9th Street; crosses State Highway 93 (Broadway); then passes the University of Colorado Law School just east of Broadway. The road then crosses US 36 (28th Street), passes the Williams Village dormitory towers of the University of Colorado, and crosses State Highway 157 (Foothills Parkway). East of 55th Street, the road seems to terminate at Cherryvale Road. It actually continues, shifted slightly to the north, following a small northbound stretch of Cherryvale. Thereafter, the road leaves the city of Boulder and takes on a more rural character until approaching State Highway 42 (95th Street). At that point the more urban surroundings of Lafayette are evident, and the next two miles (3 km) run through the heart of Lafayette, including the road junction with US 287 (N. 107th St.).

About one mile (1.6 km) beyond the eastern city limits of Lafayette, the road crosses the eastern boundary of Boulder County and passes the Erie Municipal Airport. For two miles (3 km) beyond this point, Baseline Road forms the boundary between Weld County and the City and County of Broomfield. For the next two miles (3 km), from Sheridan Parkway to the interchange with I-25, the road passes through a rural northern portion of the City and County of Broomfield.

Just east of I-25, the road abuts a commercial area in the extreme northern part of the city of Thornton. For the next mile, from this point to York Street, Baseline Road marks the boundary between Adams County and the City and County of Broomfield. From York Street east, the road forms the boundary between Adams County and Weld County for the remainder of its length.

East of York Street, about 10 miles (16 km) of rural road ensue, until Brighton is entered near US 85. Baseline Road passes through the northern part of Brighton for about five miles (8 km), eventually reaching the town of Lochbuie and the interchange with I-76. Beyond I-76 the road once again takes on a rural character and continues to its eastern terminus at 16800 Watkins Road.

== Counties ==
- Boulder County
- City and County of Broomfield
- Weld County (south boundary)
- Adams County (north boundary)

== Cities and towns ==
- Boulder
- Lafayette
- Erie (south boundary)
- Broomfield
- Thornton
- Brighton
- Lochbuie (south boundary)

== Highway junctions ==
- State Highway 93 (Broadway) in Boulder
- US 36 (28th Street) in Boulder
- State Highway 157 (Foothills Parkway) in Boulder
- State Highway 42 (95th Street) in Lafayette
- US 287 (N. 107th St.) in Lafayette
- State Highway 7 from Lafayette to Broomfield (same roadway for 7 miles)
- I-25 in northern Broomfield
- US 85 in Brighton
- I-76 in Lochbuie

== Termini ==
- Western terminus: 40°00′00″N 105°17′23″W
- Eastern terminus: 40°00′02″N 104°36′11″W
