= Edward Davidson =

Edward Davidson may refer to:

- Edward S. Davidson, professor of electrical engineering and computer science
- Eddie Davidson (1973–2008), American e-mail marketer

== See also ==
- Edward Davison (disambiguation)
