= Bennett, Colorado =

Statutory town in Adams and Arapahoe counties, Colorado, United States

- Statutory town
- Town of Bennett
- Bennett skyline (2007)
- Motto: "Welcome Neighbors"
- Location of Bennett in Adams and Arapahoe counties of Colorado
- Coordinates: 39°45′11″N 104°25′53″W
- Country: United States
- State: Colorado
- Counties: Adams and Arapahoe
- Incorporated (town): January 22, 1930

Government
  - Type: statutory town
  - Mayor: Whitney Oakley

Area
  - Total: 5.801 sq mi (15.024 km^{2})
  - Land: 5.795 sq mi (15.008 km^{2})
  - Water: 0.0062 sq mi (0.016 km^{2})
- Elevation: 5,506 ft (1,678 m)

Population (2020)
  - Total: 2,862
  - Estimate (2026): 4,421
  - Density: 494/sq mi (191/km^{2})
- Time zone: UTC−07:00 (MST)
  - Summer (DST): UTC−06:00 (MDT)
- ZIP code: 80102
- Area codes: 303/720/983
- GNIS town ID: 2411676
- FIPS code: 08-06090
- Website: Town of Bennett

Bennett is a statutory town located in Adams and Arapahoe counties, Colorado, United States. The town population was 2,862 at the 2020 United States census with 2,443 residing in Adams County and 419 residing in Arapahoe County.

== History ==
Bennett was originally known as Kiowa Crossing or Bennett Station. A post office operating under the name Bennet opened on March 16, 1877, named for Hiram Pitt Bennet, a congressional delegate from the Territory of Colorado and Colorado Secretary of State. The spelling was officially changed to Bennett on June 1, 1907.

=== Bennett Station at Kiowa Crossing (1877-1907) ===
During the late 19th century, the settlement served as a pivotal railroad and ranching hub on the Kansas Pacific Railway (later Union Pacific) line.

==== The Kiowa Creek Train Wreck (1878) ====
On May 21, 1878, a disastrous flood struck the Kiowa Crossing. Heavy rains caused Kiowa Creek to swell, washing out the railroad embankment and the bridge. A Kansas Pacific Railway train consisting of 25 cars loaded with scrap iron fell into the torrent. Crewmen Frank Seldon (identified in later reports as Belden), George Piatt, and John Bacon were on board during the accident. A 1914 retrospective by Union Pacific Superintendent Vickroy stated that a guest passenger, a hotel clerk named Peysert, also went down with the engine. While most of the wreckage was recovered, the locomotive disappeared into the sandy creek bed.

Eyewitnesses described the flood's force as comparable to Niagara Falls, capable of lifting heavy boulders and iron-like Valmont stone and carrying them downstream. Following the disaster, Colonel Fisher, the division superintendent, quickly constructed a "surface bridge" to replace the lost structure, a method successfully used by the Denver and Rio Grande Railroad to mitigate costs and delays from washouts.

The "Lost Locomotive of Kiowa Creek" became a local legend. While official records identify the engine as #51, the 1914 account claimed it was a new Baldwin No. 73. Public recovery efforts at the time were extensive but futile; Master Mechanic I. W. Nesmith reportedly spent $6,000 probing the creek bed with iron rods and excavating to a depth of 40 feet, but discovered only a pair of car trucks.

The mystery inspired Clive Cussler to write Night Probe!. In 1989, Cussler's National Underwater and Marine Agency (NUMA) attempted to locate the engine but failed, a search detailed in his non-fiction book The Sea Hunters. It was later discovered by Union Pacific archivist Lloyd Glasier that the railroad had secretly recovered the locomotive shortly after the wreck, rebuilt it under a new number, and successfully collected insurance money for a "total loss" in an act of insurance fraud.

==== Ranching and Local Life ====
The area surrounding Bennett Station was home to extensive ranching operations. Colonel John G. Clopper, a veteran of the Civil War, established the "Living Springs" ranch 12 miles north of the station in 1883. Clopper improved the property, which had been a point of interest on the old overland stage route, by building a race track and breeding Hambletonian and Mambrino trotting horses until his death in 1885. Other prominent stockmen, including Hon. Ed Knott and George C. Mack, utilized the station for shipping cattle and hogs to markets in Denver and the east.

Life at the station was occasionally hazardous. In 1898, a sheepherder named Feles Martinez and his dog were killed by lightning on a range south of town. Railroad accidents also claimed lives, including a section hand named Spencer in 1894 and William Epple, the son of a local rancher, who died in 1904 after jumping from a moving train. Criminal activity commonly disrupted the Bennett community, most notably in 1885 when a dispute over mail resulted in the shooting death of Postmaster George W. Smith by Louis Scherrer, who claimed self-defense. Law enforcement also dealt with thefts and property crimes, such as the 1882 recovery of silverware stolen from Bishop Spalding in Denver, the 1900 capture of a horse thief, and an 1898 incident where three boys stole and wrecked a railroad handcar.

=== Bennett (1907-1909) ===
Following the official spelling change to Bennett in June 1907, the area became a focal point for the "dry farming" movement in Colorado.

==== The Scientific Farming Boom ====
Beginning in 1906, the Campbell System of Soil Culture established a 320-acre model farm at Bennett to demonstrate that agriculture could succeed on the arid plains without irrigation. The project utilized a 32-horsepower compound engine capable of plowing, packing, and seeding 40 acres a day.

The success of these experiments attracted significant attention. The Denver Chamber of Commerce organized excursions via Union Pacific motor cars to view the fields, and lecturers like Mrs. Louise Palmer promoted the scientific methods. By 1907, local farmers such as John Egelhoff were reporting successful yields of barley and wheat using these dry farming techniques.

Real estate developers heavily advertised the area's potential, selling land for $3 to $20 an acre and touting the "Campbell system" as a guarantee of profit. This agricultural boom brought increased traffic to the town; however, it was not without tragedy. In September 1907, Thomas O'Reilley, a young farmer attending a dry farming convention in Bennett, was killed while attempting to jump onto a moving Rock Island flyer train.

=== Bennett (1910-1919) ===
During the 1910s, Bennett continued to develop as an agricultural hub while serving as a key transit point on the "Ocean to Ocean" highway route.

==== Agriculture and Infrastructure ====
The region faced volatile agricultural conditions early in the decade. In January 1912, a severe winter caused starvation among cattle herds in eastern Colorado; reports from Bennett indicated that while most ranchers fed their stock, authorities had to intervene in cases of neglect. By 1914, however, dry farming efforts had matured. Civil engineer O. G. Emery reported that winter wheat crops were thriving, prompting a Denver milling concern to plan the construction of a grain elevator in the town.

Bennett also became a waypoint for early transcontinental automotive travel. In 1911, the Omaha-Denver Good Roads Association met with the Denver Chamber of Commerce in Bennett to promote a coast-to-coast highway. By 1918, the ownership of this highway became the subject of a legal battle between Adams County and the Union Pacific Railroad. The railroad filed suit to enjoin the county from using the road, claiming it sat on their 400-foot right-of-way granted by the Congressional Act of 1864. The county argued that the road's continuous public use for twenty years and the railroad's failure to assert ownership immediately after the passage of the 1912 Norris Act validated the county's claim.

==== Accidents and Tragedies ====
The town's location along major rail and road arteries led to several high-profile accidents. On April 25, 1916, a fatal automobile wreck occurred two miles east of Bennett involving the family of Gordon Jones, president of the United States National Bank. A tire blowout caused their vehicle to overturn and catch fire. Jones's son, Gordon Jones Jr., and his son-in-law, Richard Turner Jones, were killed; his daughter was severely burned after being pinned beneath the burning car.

Railroad fatalities continued to occur near the station. In 1910, ranch hand H. W. Underwood was struck and killed by a freight train, and in 1912, Union Pacific brakeman Frank B. Young died after falling from a boxcar. Financial hardship also took a toll; in 1916, local farmer and hotel keeper J. F. Hay committed suicide by stepping in front of a train in Byers following the failure of the Strasburg bank and his inability to secure a loan.

==== Crime ====
Lawlessness remained a challenge for the community throughout the decade. On July 4, 1918, "yeggmen" (safecrackers) blew open the vault of the Bennett State Bank using tools stolen from the Union Pacific. They escaped with between $4,000 and $5,000 in Liberty bonds and War Savings stamps, though they failed to breach the inner safe containing the cash.

Other notable incidents included a 1912 domestic dispute in which George W. Hill chased his wife, who had kidnapped their children, by automobile from Bennett to Aurora, firing a pistol to try and stop her. In 1914, resident Mrs. William McIntire made news when she killed a coyote with an axe after the animal attacked her dog in her chicken yard. Additionally, the town dealt with various thefts, including a 1917 burglary of $1,000 worth of tires from a local garage and the capture of teenage joyriders in 1919.

=== Bennett (1920-1929) ===
Throughout the 1920s, Bennett remained a center for dryland agriculture and ranching, though the decade was marked by frequent criminal activity.

==== Economy and Infrastructure ====
By 1921, the joint Adams and Arapahoe School District No. 29, centered in Bennett, reported a population of 1,000 and an assessed valuation of over $1.7 million. The local real estate market saw significant activity, with large tracts of land changing hands, including the 1920 sale of an 8,000-acre ranch to a Nebraska investor and the 1929 bankruptcy sale of the 3,860-acre Mackinzie estate. Infrastructure improvements continued, with the state highway department letting a contract in 1927 for a new bridge across Kiowa Creek.

Civic life was active; in April 1925, Bennett hosted the annual meeting of the central district of the State Federation of Women's Clubs, welcoming delegates from across the region.

==== Crime and Prohibition ====
The Bennett State Bank was a repeated target for thieves during the decade. In April 1921, robbers used nitroglycerin and crowbars to breach the vault but failed to open the inner safe. In April 1923, thieves managed to punch a hole in the bank's wall but only escaped with $40 in pennies. A more dramatic attempt occurred in March 1925, when a bandit kidnapped Denver taxi driver John Grant, tied him up, and left him in a snowbank near town. Grant freed himself and telephoned a warning to the bank; the forewarned staff locked the doors, forcing the bandit to flee when he arrived.

Violations of the Volstead Act were common. Federal agents frequently raided stills in the area, and local rancher William Minshall became a fixture in the courts, facing acquittal on liquor charges three times in as many months during late 1925 and early 1926. Other crimes included the 1928 armed robbery of the Tom Service filling station by two youths and the theft of lumber and livestock.

==== Accidents and Weather ====
Severe weather often isolated the community. A blizzard in January 1926 resulted in a tragic "martyrdom to motherhood" when Mrs. Nellie Bergkvist died in childbirth at a ranch 12 miles from Watkins; snowdrifts prevented a doctor from reaching her in time, and neighbors had to transport her body to the undertaker by wagon. In March 1927, heavy snows marooned trains in cuts near Bennett, requiring snowplows to free them.

Transportation accidents remained a hazard. In 1924, James Jordan of Indianapolis was killed when his auto wheel collapsed near town. In 1929, a railroad section gang discovered a severed foot on the tracks, which was identified as belonging to a teenager who had fallen under a freight train weeks earlier. The area also attracted searches for missing persons, including the 1922 disappearance of politician Alva Swain, whose abandoned car was found nearby, and the 1928 investigation into the suspicious sudden death of wealthy farmer Pritchard Buckley.

=== Bennett (1930–1939) ===
The 1930s in Bennett were defined by natural disasters, the violent end of the Prohibition era, and the town’s growing strategic importance for both transportation and military infrastructure.

==== Prohibition and Gangland Activity ====
Due to its location of being isolated yet accessible to Denver via major road and rail lines, the area surrounding Bennett became a haven for illicit alcohol production and distribution during the waning years of Prohibition. The region saw violent clashes between bootleggers and law enforcement, as well as hijackings between rival gangs.

In June 1931, a shootout over a still on a ranch near Bennett resulted in the death of Vincent Dieker and critical injuries to three others. Police discovered a large underground distilling operation at the scene. Violence flared again in June 1932, when a confrontation at the J.C. Adams ranch resulted in the death of the owner's son during a dispute with moonshiners who had leased the land under the guise of being oil prospectors. Authorities found a massive 72-barrel underground facility on the property.

Raids continued even after the repeal of Prohibition seemed imminent. In 1934, federal agents raided the farm of Sanford Parkins, discovering a 500-gallon still; Parkins had previously successfully challenged a search warrant in a case that drew attention from federal judges regarding property rights on ranches.

Criminal activity also targeted local financial institutions. In November 1931, the Bennett State Bank was indirectly involved in a major crime spree when local salesman Walter Funk was kidnapped in Bennett by the "Platteville Bank Bandits" and held hostage while they used his vehicle for a robbery in Platteville, Colorado. In May 1933, robbers used acetylene torches to break into the Bennett State Bank, though they failed to breach the main safe and escaped with only pennies.

==== The Flood of 1935 ====
Bennett was significantly affected by the massive floods of late May and early June 1935, which devastated eastern Colorado and Nebraska. While the town itself escaped total destruction, the infrastructure surrounding it was crippled. The floodwaters of Kiowa Creek washed away railroad and highway bridges, severing the Kansas Pacific Railway line between Bennett and Agate.

The disaster isolated the community and destroyed livestock and machinery on nearby low-lying farms. The American Red Cross provided aid to local victims, with one resident writing to the organization that their donation of chickens had kept the family "off relief." The flood also created hazardous conditions for aviation; a Wyoming Air Service pilot was forced to make an emergency landing in a pasture near Bennett during the storm.

==== Transportation and Infrastructure ====
Throughout the decade, the highway passing through Bennett (U.S. 40/287) was a critical but dangerous artery. The press frequently reported severe automobile accidents involving travelers moving between Kansas City and Denver. Notable incidents included a 1937 collision between a passenger car and a gasoline truck that killed two men, and the 1935 crash of a Kansas City trucking executive's airplane, which overturned in a ditch near the town.

In 1937, the Union Pacific Railroad began replacing the wooden trestles near town with steel structures. The construction project was marred by tragedy when a worker fell to his death from a bridge beam in April of that year.

==== Military Expansion and Local Life ====
By the late 1930s, the federal government began acquiring land south of Bennett for an Army Air Corps bombing range (a precursor to the Lowry Bombing and Gunnery Range). This expansion drew protest from local farmers who were displaced via eminent domain. In 1938, resident Marie Minshall wrote a public letter criticizing the government for taking "choice wheat land" and forcing families into "shacks," noting that while Denver voted for the field, the farmers had no say.

Despite the hardships of the Great Depression, civic life continued. The Bennett Turkey Growers Club was organized in 1930 to support local agriculture, and the area attracted scientific interest when a University of Denver archeological expedition became stranded in sand near the town in 1935 while hunting for Indian artifacts. By 1938, the new bombing range had inadvertently become a wildlife refuge, with state game wardens reporting that a remnant herd of antelope had taken shelter on the target fields to escape poachers.

=== Bennett after 1939 ===
==== Colorado spam king ====
Edward Davidson, known also as the "Colorado Spam King", operated an illegal spamming company, Power promotions, from July 2002 through April 2007 from a home near Bennett where he had a large network of computers and servers, according to federal authorities. The spam contained false header information, concealing the actual sender from the recipient of the e-mail. Davidson provided spammed messages for about 19 different companies, prosecutors said. Some of the e-mailed pitches were used to dupe stock investors and manipulate the market, federal authorities said. Davidson was sentenced to 21 months in federal prison and ordered to pay $714,139 to the Internal Revenue Service. On July 20, 2008, he escaped from a minimum-security federal prison in Florence, Colorado. Four days later, he was found dead with his wife and a child, both also dead, in an apparent murder-suicide near Bennett.

== Geography ==
Bennett is located at the intersection of State Highways 36 and 79, just north of Interstate 70.

At the 2020 United States census, the town had a total area of 3,713 acres (15.024 km^{2}) including 4.0 acres (0.016 km^{2}) of water.

The highest temperature ever recorded in Colorado occurred in Bennett on July 11, 1888, when it reached 118 °F (48 °C). However, climatologists say this reading is an error because the temperature in downtown Denver on that day reached 100 degrees and it would be nearly impossible for it to be 18 degrees hotter just 30 miles east.

== Education ==
Bennett is served by the Bennett 29-J School District. In the 2023-2024 school year, Bennett High School enrolled 449 students.

== Culture ==
The Town of Bennett hosts multiple events per year for both Town residents and the surrounding rural communities. Notably, since 2011 the Town of Bennett has hosted the annual Bennett Days Festival. The event includes games, art, and activities such as bull riding, and is attended by both residents and regional partners.

== Demographics ==
Historical population
Census	Pop.	Note	%±
1930	211		—
1940	199		−5.7%
1950	272		36.7%
1960	287		5.5%
1970	613		113.6%
1980	942		53.7%
1990	1,757		86.5%
2000	2,021		15.0%
2010	2,308		14.2%
2020	2,862		24.0%
2026 (est.)	4,421	▲	54.5%
U.S. Decennial Census

Bennett is a part of the Denver-Aurora-Lakewood, CO Metropolitan Statistical Area and the Front Range Urban Corridor.

=== 2020 census ===
As of the 2020 census, Bennett had a population of 2,862. The median age was 33.6 years. 28.4% of residents were under the age of 18 and 10.4% of residents were 65 years of age or older. For every 100 females there were 101.4 males, and for every 100 females age 18 and over there were 103.5 males age 18 and over.

0.0% of residents lived in urban areas, while 100.0% lived in rural areas.

There were 985 households in Bennett, of which 40.5% had children under the age of 18 living in them. Of all households, 54.5% were married-couple households, 20.4% were households with a male householder and no spouse or partner present, and 19.9% were households with a female householder and no spouse or partner present. About 20.6% of all households were made up of individuals and 7.3% had someone living alone who was 65 years of age or older.

There were 1,047 housing units, of which 5.9% were vacant. The homeowner vacancy rate was 3.4% and the rental vacancy rate was 3.4%.

Racial composition as of the 2020 census
Race	Number	Percent
White	2,134	74.6%
Black or African American	83	2.9%
American Indian and Alaska Native	19	0.7%
Asian	12	0.4%
Native Hawaiian and Other Pacific Islander	12	0.4%
Some other race	288	10.1%
Two or more races	314	11.0%
Hispanic or Latino (of any race)	555	19.4%

=== 2000 census ===
As of the census of 2000, there were 2,021 people, 715 households, and 539 families residing in the town. The population density was 652.3 inhabitants per square mile (251.9/km^{2}). There were 732 housing units at an average density of 236.3 per square mile (91.2/km^{2}). The racial makeup of the town was 94.56% White, 0.49% African American, 0.74% Native American, 0.30% Asian, 0.15% Pacific Islander, 1.63% from other races, and 2.13% from two or more races. Hispanic or Latino of any race were 4.45% of the population.

There were 715 households, out of which 49.2% had children under the age of 18 living with them, 58.3% were married couples living together, 10.9% had a female householder with no husband present, and 24.5% were non-families. 21.0% of all households were made up of individuals, and 6.7% had someone living alone who was 65 years of age or older. The average household size was 2.83 and the average family size was 3.30.

In the town, the population was spread out, with 34.5% under the age of 18, 7.0% from 18 to 24, 34.7% from 25 to 44, 18.1% from 45 to 64, and 5.6% who were 65 years of age or older. The median age was 31 years. For every 100 females, there were 103.7 males. For every 100 females age 18 and over, there were 97.8 males.

The median income for a household in the town was $46,600, and the median income for a family was $50,881. Males had a median income of $38,672 versus $26,354 for females. The per capita income for the town was $17,905. About 3.7% of families and 5.8% of the population were below the poverty line, including 5.9% of those under age 18 and 8.9% of those age 65 or over.

== See also ==
- Denver-Aurora-Lakewood, CO Metropolitan Statistical Area
