= Edward Davison =

Edward Davison may refer to:

- Edward Davison (poet) (1898–1970), Scottish poet and critic
- Edward Doran Davison (1819–1894), lumber merchant and political figure in Nova Scotia

== See also ==
- Edward Davidson (disambiguation)
