= Old Stone Congregational Church =

Historic church in Colorado, United States

Coordinates: 40.22537°N 105.26990°W

- First Congregational Church of Lyons
- U.S. National Register of Historic Places
- Colorado State Register of Historic Properties
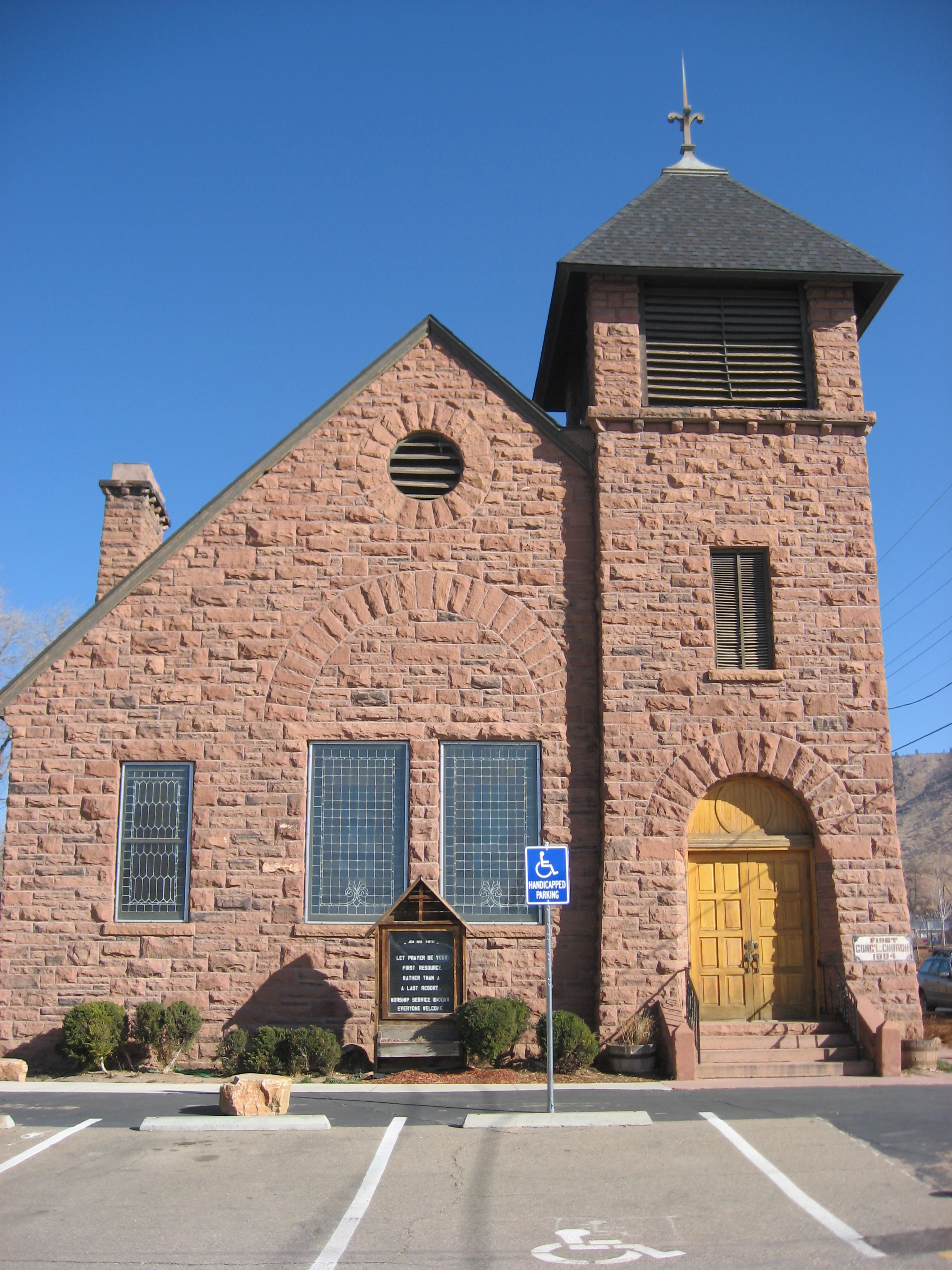
- Old Stone Congregational Church
- Location: High and 4th Sts., Lyons, Colorado
- Area: 0.1 acres (0.040 ha)
- NRHP reference No.: 76000547
- CSRHP No.: 5BL.357
- Added to NRHP: December 12, 1976

The Old Stone Congregational Church, also known as the First Congregational Church of Lyons, is a historic church in Lyons, Colorado, built in 1894-5 and listed on the National Register of Historic Places in 1976.

The First Congregational Church was organized under the sponsorship of the First Congregational Church of Longmont in 1889, less than a decade after E. S. Lyon arrived in the area from Connecticut and bought 160 acres (65 ha) of land that include the original townsite of Lyons. Construction of the church building, on the northwest corner of 4th and High Streets, began in 1894 and was completed on September 23, 1895. The minister and members of the congregation contributed much of the necessary labor, in addition to money and materials. The principal building material was sandstone that was locally quarried, cut by hand and laid in horizontal courses of irregularly sized blocks. The National Register nomination notes that much of the work on the building was done by master stonecutters with the result that the "cutting and fitting [of the stone] is exceptionally well executed." The walls are 20 inches (51 cm) thick.

The facade is asymmetrical with the church's principal door leading into the base of a single tower. The door has a semicircular arch of radiating stone voussoirs. Central to the facade are a pair of windows topped by horizontal stone lintels. A decorative feature of the facade is the large arch of voussoirs which rises above the windows. In the gable is an ocular ventilation opening framed by voussoirs and set with louvres. The tower rises to a stone course at the height of the gable, above which is a louvred chamber with a "candle-snuffer" roof.

For more than ten years after the completion of the building (until a Methodist church was built in town), this was the only church in Lyons. At the time of its National Register listing, the congregation was affiliated with the United Church of Christ, but it no longer identifies itself with that denomination.
