= Colorado State Highway 42 =

State highway in Colorado, United States

State Highway 42
- SH 42 highlighted in red

Route information
- Maintained by CDOT
- Length: 4.876 mi (7.847 km)

Major junctions
- North end: SH 7 in Lafayette
- Louisville
- East end: US 287 in Lafayette

Location
- Country: United States
- State: Colorado
- Counties: Boulder

Highway system
- Colorado State Highway System; Interstate; US; State; Scenic
← SH 41	→ SH 44

State Highway 42 (SH 42) is a state highway in Boulder County, Colorado, United States. It runs south from SH 7 to Louisville and then east to US 287.

== Route description ==
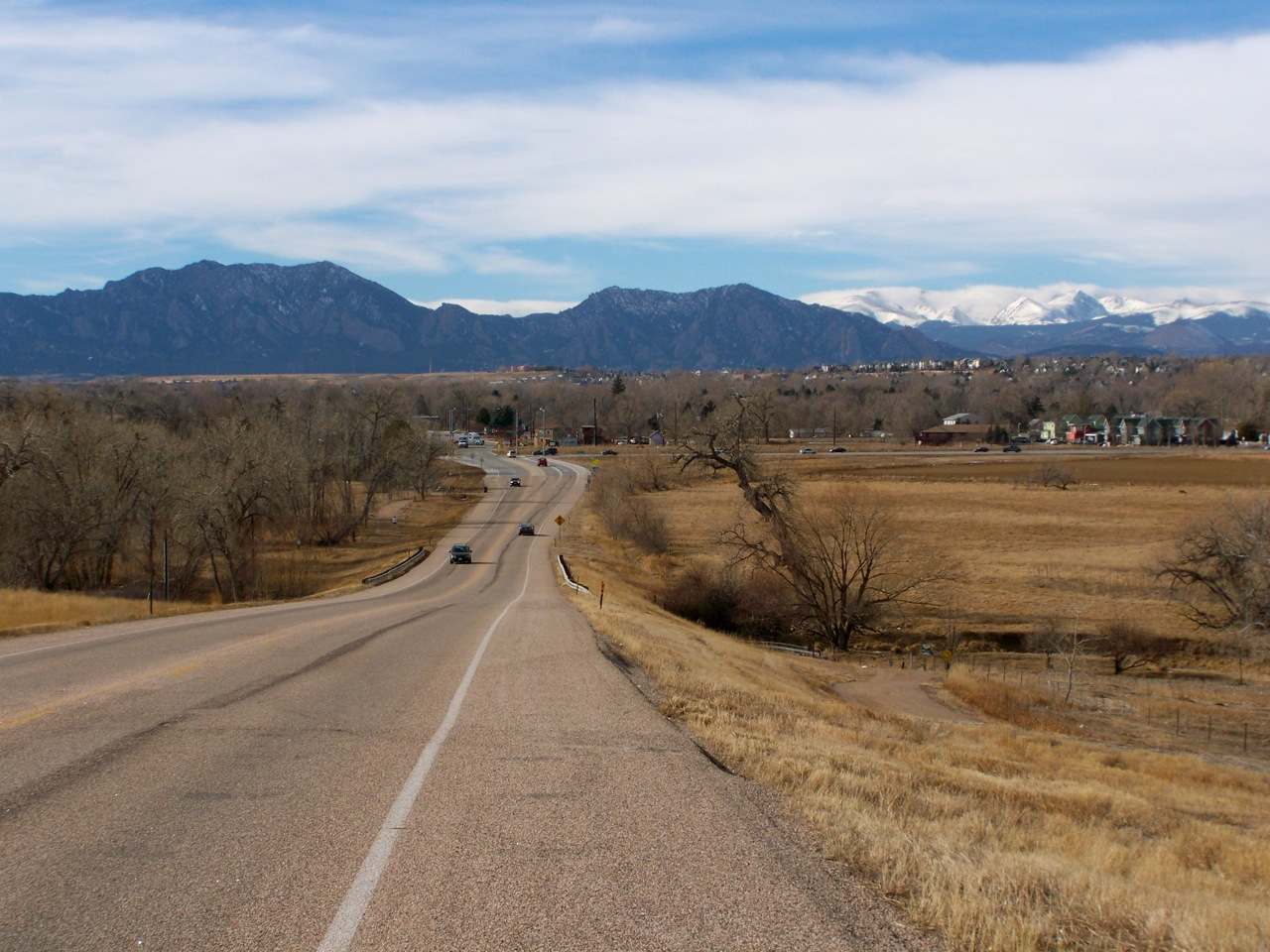
Westbound on SH 42 in Louisville

SH 42 begins in northwestern Lafayette at a junction with SH 7 (Arapahoe Road) and heads south on 95th Street. 1 mile (1.6 km) later, after crossing Baseline Road, the roadway S-curves to the east to line up with 96th Street, though it keeps the 95th Street name until the Louisville city limits. After bypassing downtown Louisville to the east, SH 42 turns east onto a road that becomes Empire Road upon leaving Louisville. It ends at US 287 south of downtown Lafayette.

== History ==
State Highway 168 was designated in 1932-1934 along a route similar to the present SH 42, but using a number of different roadways. It began on SH 7 in the same place and headed south on 95th Street, but the S-curve was not in place and it jogged east on Baseline Road to reach 96th Street. SH 168 then jogged west on South Boulder Road across the railroad to Louisville's Main Street, and turned east on Pine Street, crossing SH 42 onto Empire Road. This street curves south to meet SH 42 at the current city limits of Louisville, after which SH 168 followed SH 42 to end at SH 1 (now US 287). In 1953 the state highway system was greatly reduced and SH 168 disappeared. The loop through Louisville returned to the system in 1960-1961 with a new number: State Highway 42. Two new segments of road were built in about 1970, giving SH 42 its current shape (but initially a sweeping curve carried traffic around the corner east of downtown Louisville).

== Major intersections ==
The entire route is in Boulder County.

Location	mi	km	Destinations	Notes
Lafayette	0.000	0.000	SH 7	Northern terminus
Louisville	2.624	4.223	Pine Street / Empire Road – Louisville	
Louisville	2.951	4.749	96th Street	SH 42 changes direction
Louisville	3.795	6.107	104th Street / Empire Road	
Lafayette	4.876	7.847	US 287	Eastern terminus
1.000 mi = 1.609 km; 1.000 km = 0.621 mi

== See also ==
- List of state highways in Colorado
