= Lochbuie, Colorado =

Town in Colorado, United States

Town of Lochbuie, Colorado
- Statutory Town
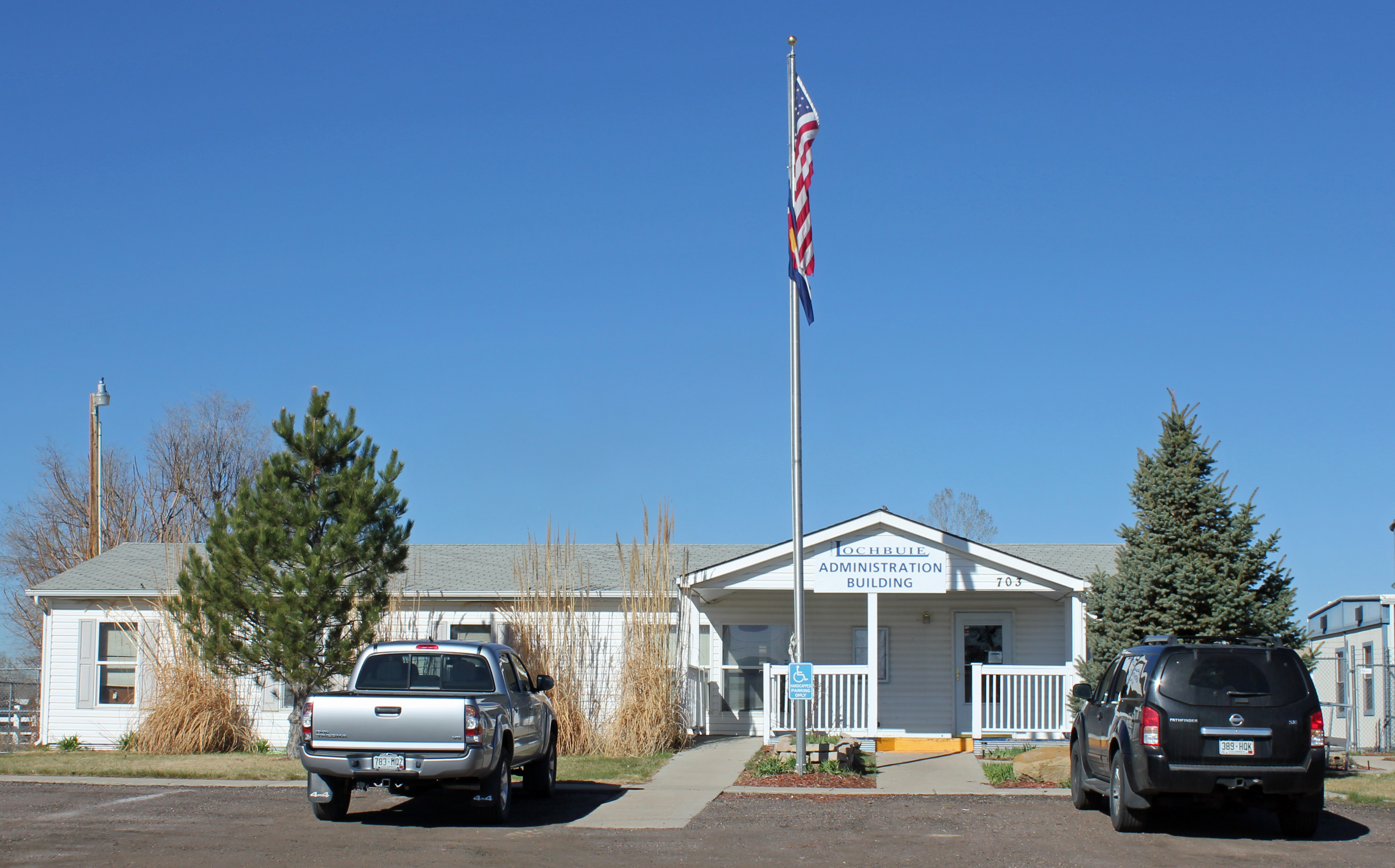
- The Lochbuie Administration Building.

- Location of Lochbuie in Adams County and Weld County, Colorado.
- Coordinates: 40°00′25″N 104°44′15″W
- Country: United States
- State: Colorado
- Counties: Weld County; Adams County
- Incorporated: May 1974

Government
  - Type: Statutory Town

Area
  - Total: 3.71 sq mi (9.60 km^{2})
  - Land: 3.68 sq mi (9.54 km^{2})
  - Water: 0.023 sq mi (0.06 km^{2})
- Elevation: 5,043 ft (1,537 m)

Population (2020)
  - Total: 8,088
  - Density: 2,200/sq mi (848/km^{2})
- Time zone: UTC-7 (MST)
  - Summer (DST): UTC-6 (MDT)
- ZIP code: 80603
- Area codes: Both 303 and 720
- FIPS code: 08-45530
- GNIS feature ID: 2412905
- Website: Town of Lochbuie

The Town of Lochbuie (/lɒkˈbuːi/ lok-BOO-ee) is a statutory town located in Weld and Adams counties in the U.S. state of Colorado. The town population was 8,088 at the 2020 United States census.

== Geography ==
According to the United States Census Bureau, the town has a total area of 1.4 square miles (3.5 km^{2}), of which, 1.3 square miles (3.5 km^{2}) of it is land and 0.04 square miles (0.1 km^{2}) of it (1.47%) is water.

== History ==
Lochbuie was developed in the 1960s as the Spacious Living Mobile Home Park and known as Space City until it was incorporated in 1974. The town was named Lochbuie after Lochbuie, Mull, in Scotland.

== Demographics ==
Historical population
| Census | Pop. | Note | %± |
|---|---|---|---|
| 1980 | 895 | | — |
| 1990 | 1,168 | | 30.5% |
| 2000 | 2,049 | | 75.4% |
| 2010 | 4,726 | | 130.6% |
| 2020 | 8,088 | | 71.1% |
| 2023 (est.) | 8,336 | ▲ | 3.1% |

=== 2020 census ===
As of the 2020 census, Lochbuie had a population of 8,088. The median age was 30.6 years. 31.8% of residents were under the age of 18 and 6.7% of residents were 65 years of age or older. For every 100 females there were 101.4 males, and for every 100 females age 18 and over there were 101.4 males age 18 and over.

96.5% of residents lived in urban areas, while 3.5% lived in rural areas.

There were 2,515 households in Lochbuie, of which 48.7% had children under the age of 18 living in them. Of all households, 59.6% were married-couple households, 15.5% were households with a male householder and no spouse or partner present, and 16.9% were households with a female householder and no spouse or partner present. About 14.9% of all households were made up of individuals and 4.8% had someone living alone who was 65 years of age or older.

There were 2,565 housing units, of which 1.9% were vacant. The homeowner vacancy rate was 0.9% and the rental vacancy rate was 3.3%.

Racial composition as of the 2020 census
| Race | Number | Percent |
|---|---|---|
| White | 4,769 | 59.0% |
| Black or African American | 107 | 1.3% |
| American Indian and Alaska Native | 147 | 1.8% |
| Asian | 117 | 1.4% |
| Native Hawaiian and Other Pacific Islander | 11 | 0.1% |
| Some other race | 1,678 | 20.7% |
| Two or more races | 1,259 | 15.6% |
| Hispanic or Latino (of any race) | 3,683 | 45.5% |

== See also ==
- Front Range Urban Corridor
- North Central Colorado Urban Area
- Denver-Aurora-Boulder, CO Combined Statistical Area
- Greeley, CO Metropolitan Statistical Area
