= Lyons, Colorado =

Town in Colorado, United States

- Statutory Town
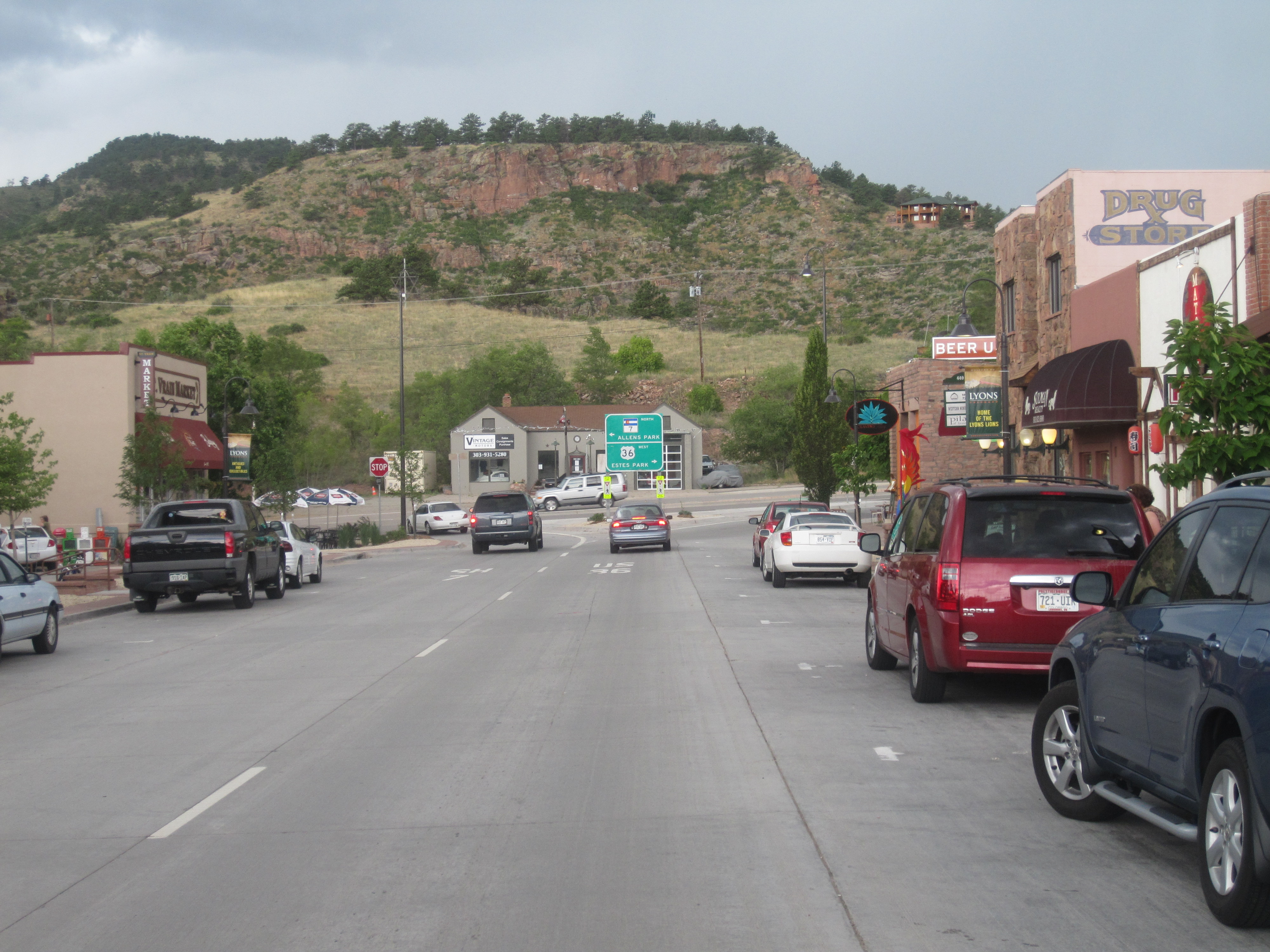
- Downtown Lyons toward the intersection of U.S. Highway 36 and State Highway 7
- Nickname: Double Gateway to the Rockies
- Location of Lyons in Boulder County, Colorado.
- Coordinates: 40°13′06″N 105°15′02″W
- Country: United States
- State: Colorado
- County: Boulder
- Founded: 1880
- Platted: 1881
- Incorporated (town): April 10, 1891
- Founder: Edward S. Lyon

Government
  - Type: Statutory Town
  - Mayor: Mark Browning

Area
  - Total: 1.36 sq mi (3.53 km^{2})
  - Land: 1.35 sq mi (3.49 km^{2})
  - Water: 0.015 sq mi (0.04 km^{2})
- Elevation: 5,341 ft (1,628 m)

Population (2020)
  - Total: 2,209
  - Density: 1,625.9/sq mi (627.78/km^{2})
- Time zone: UTC-7 (Mountain (MST))
  - Summer (DST): UTC-6 (MDT)
- ZIP code: 80540
- Area code(s): 303 & 720
- FIPS code: 08-47070
- GNIS feature ID: 2412930
- Website: www.townoflyons.com

Lyons is a Statutory Town in Boulder County, Colorado, United States. The town population was 2,209 at the 2020 United States census, up from 2,033 at the 2010 United States census. Lyons is located at the confluence of North St. Vrain Creek and South St. Vrain Creek, 20 miles (32 km) east of Rocky Mountain National Park. Due to its location at the intersection of State Highway 7 and U.S. Highway 36, both of which lead to the national park, it is sometimes referred to as "The Double Gateway to the Rockies".

== History ==
In the 17th century, the Ute Nation came to Colorado. The largest tribes that followed were the Cheyenne, Arapaho, and Comanche, along with the Pawnee occasionally. The Utes were the last tribe to be forced into Indian reservations after the Colorado Gold Rush. The Utes were the only tribe that extensively explored the mountains and Lyons area. The Plains Indians were attracted to the vast grasslands where it was ideal for hunting bison.

In the 1860s, families came from the eastern United States and settled the foothills with their ranches and farms. The town of Lyons was founded in 1880 by Edward S. Lyon. He purchased 160 acres (0.6 km^{2}) from H.F. and Isabelle Sawyer, noticing the potential to quarry out the red sandstone outcroppings which offered easy quarrying access in the region. Lyon platted the town in 1881; it was incorporated in 1891. No record survives to account for the added "s" at the end of the town's name.

The first main building to be built was the red sandstone schoolhouse in 1881. The booming population resulted in the town adding a second floor a few years later. It was also used for church and town meetings until 1894 when the Old Stone Church was built. In 1979, it was saved from demolition and converted into the town's history museum by the Lyons Historical Society.

The town has large red sandstone mountains on three sides. Its rock, from the Permian period, about 260 million years ago, is considered the hardest sandstone in the world, and has a unique red or salmon color. While E. S. Lyon established the quarrying business in the town, his business was not a big success, and he left for California. Numerous owners succeeded him and developed various successful quarries over time. Murphy, Brodie, Ohline, Loukonen and Vasquez are among the most noteworthy owners. The Denver, Utah and Pacific Railroad laid narrow gauge tracks into Lyons in 1884 to serve the quarries.

In 1910-12 the cement industry killed the sandstone industry, and rock production stopped. The only sandstone construction that went on during this period was the University of Colorado's new unified campus. The sandstone business was revived in the 1930s when the red sandstone started to be used more as a decorative rock than for commercial purposes. Today it is a booming industry, with sandstone shipped worldwide.

On September 12, 2013, the town of Lyons was severely affected by flooding. All access routes to the town were blocked, and sewer and fresh water service was disrupted. The National Guard began evacuating the entire town of Lyons on September 12 at daybreak. While many mountain residents had to be evacuated by Chinook helicopter, the town's residents were able to drive out in their own vehicles, as the main road through town, Highway 36, was not completely washed out.

=== Historic buildings ===
The town is active in history preservation. The Lyons Historical Society, formed in 1976, helped preserve the 1881 schoolhouse (now the Lyons Redstone Museum) and the train depot (now municipal offices). It has recorded video interviews of its pioneer families and published four books on the town's history and five books on pioneer family histories. Lyons has a Designated Historic District, with fifteen sandstone structures which are listed in the National Register of Historic Places. These were all constructed of native stone by master craftsmen between the early 1870s and 1917. They include commercial, residential and public buildings:

- Griff Evans Homestead (1870): Now the site of Rocky Grass and Folks Festivals
- 480 Seward St. (1890): Chisholm/Truebood Home
- 413 Seward St. (1890): Cunningham/Weese Home
- 409 Seward St. (1890): Montgomery Home
- 426 High St. (1884): Lyons General Store, now Ralston Bros. Antiques
- NW Corner 4th and High Streets (1894): Old Stone Congregational Church
- NE Corner 4th & High Streets (1881): Lyons School. Now Redstone Museum
- 427 High St. (1890s): Dynamite storage building
- 450 Main St. (1881): McAllister Saloon/Frank Market, now Main Stage Brewing
- 415 Main St. (1890): General Store/Kandy Kitchen, now South Creek Ltd.
- 401 Main St.(1917): Turner Stevens Building, now Solhawk
- 5th & Broadway (1881): Train Depot, Horse Water Tank (1897)
- S. St. Vrain (1870): Bradford Homestead, 330 Bradford Street, privately owned
- 1/2 mi. E. on Hwy. 66 (1885): Sites Milkhouse, now C. Shepard Gallery
- 3 Mi. E on Hwy. 66 (1917): Montgomery School, now M. Weston home

== Geography ==
Lyons is located in northern Boulder County.

According to the United States Census Bureau, the town has a total area of 1.2 square miles (3.2 km^{2}), of which 0.015 square miles (0.04 km^{2}), or 1.30%, is water, consisting of St. Vrain Creek and its branches.

== Demographics ==
Historical population
Census	Pop.	Note	%±
1890	574		—
1900	547		−4.7%
1910	632		15.5%
1920	570		−9.8%
1930	567		−0.5%
1940	654		15.3%
1950	689		5.4%
1960	706		2.5%
1970	958		35.7%
1980	1,137		18.7%
1990	1,227		7.9%
2000	1,585		29.2%
2010	2,033		28.3%
2020	2,209		8.7%
U.S. Decennial Census

=== 2020 census ===
As of the 2020 census, Lyons had a population of 2,209. The median age was 44.2 years. 23.7% of residents were under the age of 18 and 14.1% of residents were 65 years of age or older. For every 100 females there were 92.9 males, and for every 100 females age 18 and over there were 95.7 males age 18 and over.

0.0% of residents lived in urban areas, while 100.0% lived in rural areas.

There were 874 households in Lyons, of which 38.2% had children under the age of 18 living in them. Of all households, 58.0% were married-couple households, 12.9% were households with a male householder and no spouse or partner present, and 21.5% were households with a female householder and no spouse or partner present. About 19.8% of all households were made up of individuals and 8.4% had someone living alone who was 65 years of age or older.

There were 909 housing units, of which 3.9% were vacant. The homeowner vacancy rate was 0.6% and the rental vacancy rate was 4.3%.

Racial composition as of the 2020 census
Race	Number	Percent
White	2,006	90.8%
Black or African American	5	0.2%
American Indian and Alaska Native	7	0.3%
Asian	21	1.0%
Native Hawaiian and Other Pacific Islander	1	0.0%
Some other race	41	1.9%
Two or more races	128	5.8%
Hispanic or Latino (of any race)	117	5.3%

=== 2000 census ===
As of the census of 2000, there were 1,585 people, 672 households, and 436 families residing in the town. The population density was 1,273.5 inhabitants per square mile (491.7/km^{2}). There were 686 housing units at an average density of 551.2 per square mile (212.8/km^{2}). The racial makeup of the town was 92.49% White, 0.38% African American, 0.88% Native American, 0.69% Asian, 4.23% from other races, and 1.32% from two or more races. Hispanic or Latino of any race were 8.01% of the population.

There were 672 households, out of which 33.8% had children under the age of 18 living with them, 49.3% were married couples living together, 11.5% had a female householder with no husband present, and 35.1% were non-families. Of all households, 25.7% were made up of individuals, and 5.4% had someone living alone who was 65 years of age or older. The average household size was 2.36 and the average family size was 2.85.

In the town, the population was spread out, with 24.0% under the age of 18, 6.9% from 18 to 24, 36.3% from 25 to 44, 26.8% from 45 to 64, and 6.1% who were 65 years of age or older. The median age was 38 years. For every 100 females, there were 101.4 males. For every 100 females age 18 and over, there were 101.8 males.

The median income for a household in the town was $50,764, and the median income for a family was $58,750. Males had a median income of $45,417 versus $29,750 for females. The per capita income for the town was $28,276. About 6.6% of families and 8.3% of the population were below the poverty line, including 12.2% of those under age 18 and 2.3% of those age 65 or over.

== Lyons Redstone Museum ==
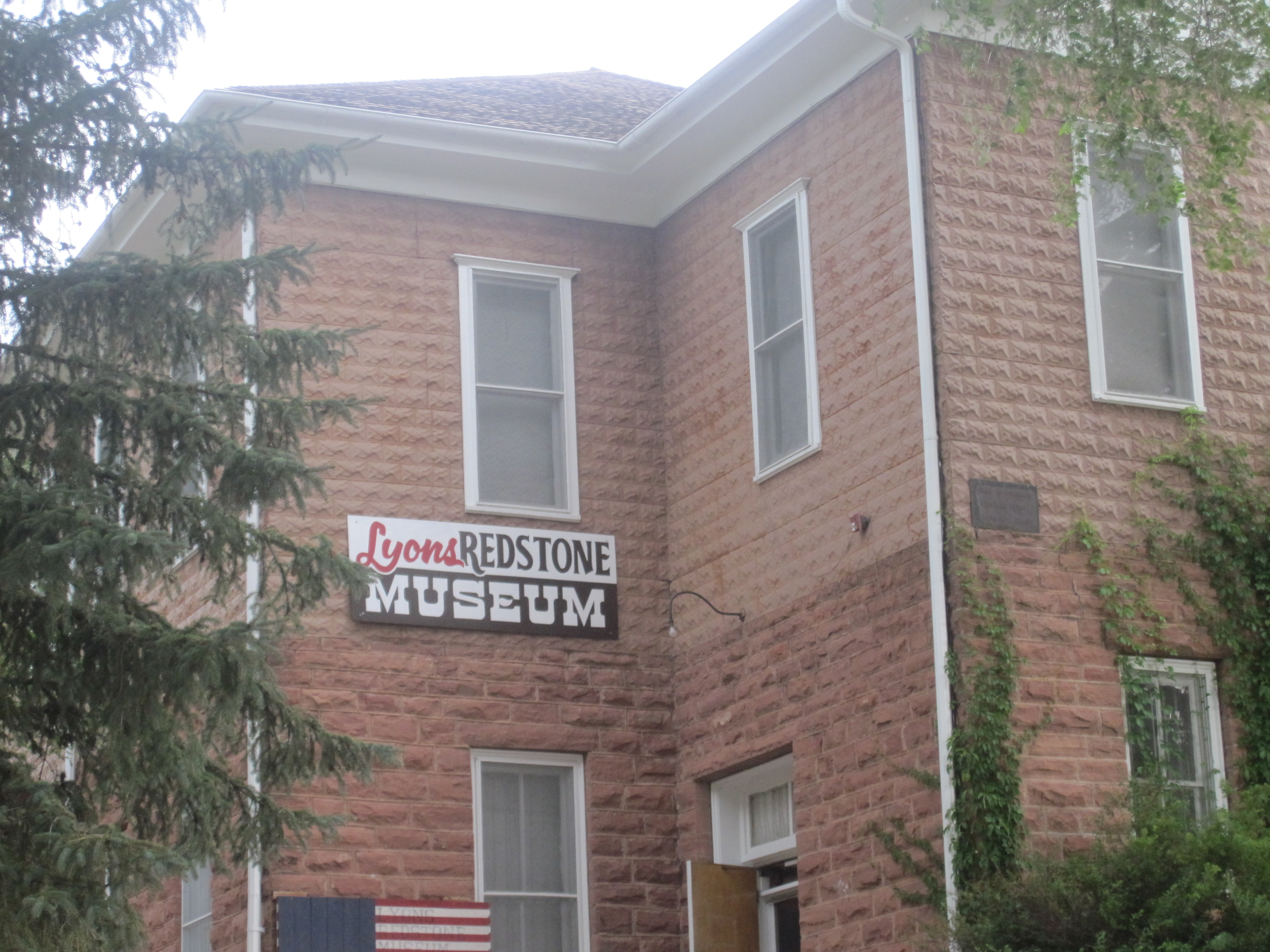
Lyons Redstone Museum

The Lyons Redstone Museum started out as the town's school house, built in 1881. Grades one through eight were taught, and graduation certificates were handed out. It was the first major building constructed in town. It stands on a small hill, overlooking the town. It is used as a guidepost for people studying old photographs of Lyons. The original 30-by-40-foot (9.1 by 12.2 m) building was made by expert stonemasons out of the local red sandstone. For the first few years, it was used for church services and town meetings. The population boomed, and in 1895 there was a need to add a second floor. It was more for practical purposes and was not as beautifully designed. When the town built an elementary and high school, the school district decided to raze the building. The Lyons Historical Society fought for three years, and it was rewarded with use of a building to establish their history museum in.

The museum is open June 1 to October 1, seven days a week. It was dedicated in 1979. It is free and open to the public on a donation basis. The first floor has historic displays (including an old bank teller cage, re-created living room and kitchen area, quarry and small farm equipment, musical instruments, dairy equipment, and more). It has arrowhead and electric insulator collections. The first-floor work area contains the town's history archives (mainly newspaper clippings), video interviews and documentaries of its pioneer families, and a small gift and book shop. Books for sale include multiple history books of the area, and hundreds of used books from 1900 to today.

The second floor has some displays (like ice cream parlor booths), but mainly it has dozens of archival black-and-white photographs of early Lyons, from the 1880s to 1940s. Along the walls are all of the Lyons High School graduation photos, beginning in the 1930s. Since the 1881 building did not open as a museum until the 1970s, some of the records are incomplete regarding early town history, but it is extensively covered by the locally produced books and DVD documentaries. It is located at 412 High Street in Lyons.

== Culture ==
=== Art ===
The free Lyons Studio Tour (formerly Lyons Artique) is held each year, since 2004, for one weekend in May or June, with up to 50 artists showing their work in their home studios or in Lyons shops and galleries. For two years, there was a Sculpture Trail with several dozens pieces made specifically for the Trail. It featured a trail of outdoor sculptures along a pre-determined path. An annual booklet had quotes from the artists, and contained a story that people could follow as they took the Trail.

The Lyons Arts and Humanities Council is a group that is instrumental in helping to promote art in downtown Lyons and its artists' works. There are several pieces of permanent public art, including sculptures made of local sandstone, such as giant eggs, flower containers, a fountain, a small performance stage, and more.

In 2008 and 2009, the town renovated its two main streets to include sandstone sidewalks and features, floral decorations, seating areas and sculptures. It won a Governor's Award for Downtown Excellence in 2010.

As a public community art project, a mural depicting life in Lyons, called "Lyons Past, Present and Future", was placed on the outdoor wall of the Visitor Center in June 2003. A second project, called The Clarifier Project, involves the community painting tiles to decorate the former wastewater treatment building next to St. Vrain Creek.

=== Music ===
Major concerts in Lyons are the two annual music festivals held at Planet Bluegrass: the Rockygrass Bluegrass festival, and the Folks Festival folk music festival. It draws people from across the nation because of its nationally known lineup and its general seating in open grassy, treed grounds, at the base of a red sandstone mountain along St. Vrain Creek. In addition to a new stage for the festivals in recent years, they have built the Wildflower covered pavilion which allows for smaller year-round concerts.

The Sounds of Lyons concert series began in 2009, bringing in highly acclaimed classically trained musicians to perform over one weekend in spring. High Street Concerts began in 2001, and concerts take place during the winter months bringing national and local acoustic and Americana acts. In addition, there are sporadic community concerts and dances throughout the year, including weekly summer concerts in Sandstone Park and occasionally at Lyons High School. The Red Rock Ramblers began square dancing in Lyons in 1958 and offer dances every Saturday during the summer.

=== Recreation ===
Area recreation includes mountain biking, hiking, camping, fly fishing, climbing and excellent class II-V whitewater kayaking. Lyons is bordered by Hall Ranch Open Space and Heil Valley Ranch Open Space. Hall Ranch provides over 12 miles (19 km) of multi-use trails and consists of 3,206 acres (12.97 km^{2}) of back country. Heil Valley Ranch consists of 4,923 acres (19.92 km^{2}) of back country. Trails are open to hikers, mountain bikers and equestrians. Picture Rock Trail was opened on September 22, 2008, connecting Heil Valley Ranch trails to Lyons and to Hall Ranch trails. Picture Rock is 5.5 miles (8.9 km) and well designed and built by volunteers. The north end of Picture Rock is at Red Gulch Road, then Old St Vrain Road and Highway 7 lead to the Hall Ranch Trailhead or Lyons. The south end of Picture Rock is 4.5 miles (7.2 km) from the Heil Ranch Trailhead off Lefthand Canyon.

Services:

The Town of Lyons is served by the Lyons Fire Protection District and the Boulder Sheriff's Department. Lyons is part of the St Vrain Valley School District and is home to Lyons High School and an elementary school.

The town has no hospitals and is serviced by Longmont United Hospital or Boulder Community Hospital which are within a short drive. The Fire Department provides emergency services including EMT duties.

== See also ==
- 2013 Colorado floods
