= Colorado State Highway 157 =

State highway in Colorado, United States

State Highway 157
- Foothills Parkway
- SH 157 highlighted in red

Route information
- Maintained by CDOT
- Length: 4.530 mi (7.290 km)

Major junctions
- South end: US 36 in Boulder
- North end: SH 119 in Boulder

Location
- Country: United States
- State: Colorado
- Counties: Boulder

Highway system
- Colorado State Highway System; Interstate; US; State; Scenic
← SH 151	→ SH 159

State Highway 157 (SH 157) is a 4.530-mile-long (7.3 km) state highway in Boulder, Colorado. SH 157 is also known as Foothills Parkway in Boulder's city street naming system. SH 157's southern terminus is at U.S. Route 36 (US 36) in Boulder, and the northern terminus is at SH 119 in Boulder.

== Route description ==
The road begins in the south at a junction with US 36, the Denver-Boulder Turnpike. It travels northward through the city of Boulder, crossing SH 7 (Arapahoe Avenue) before connecting to its northern terminus at SH 119.

Between fall 2019 and fall 2020, the City of Boulder replaced the outdated and deteriorating bicycle and pedestrian overpass just south of Colorado Ave. with an ADA-compliant underpass.

== Major intersections ==
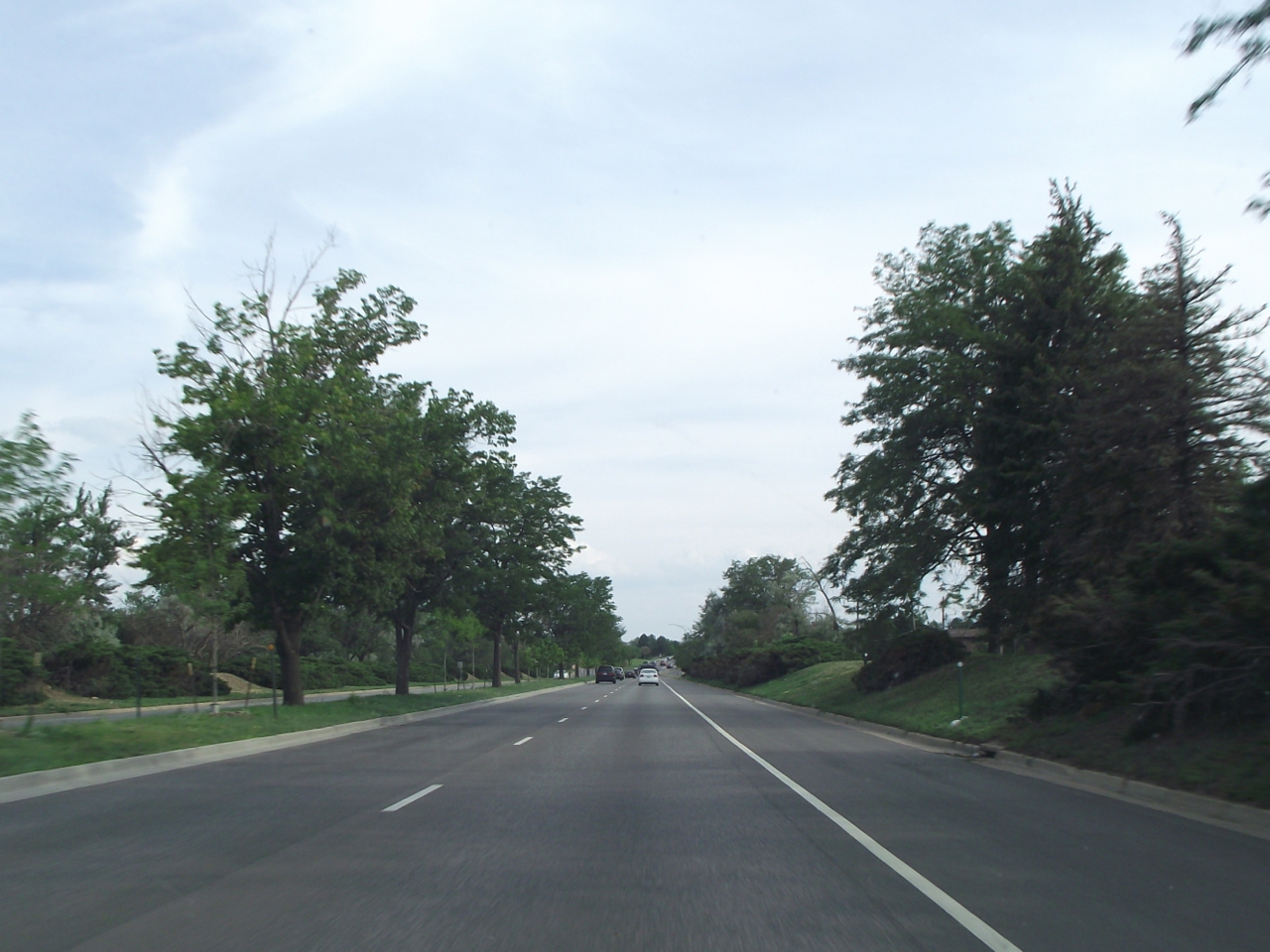
Foothills Parkway

The entire route is in Boulder, Boulder County.

mi	km	Destinations	Notes
0.000	0.000	US 36	South end of route
2.036	3.277	SH 7 (Arapahoe Avenue)	
4.530	7.290	SH 119	North end of route
1.000 mi = 1.609 km; 1.000 km = 0.621 mi
