= Eddie Davidson =

E-mail spammer

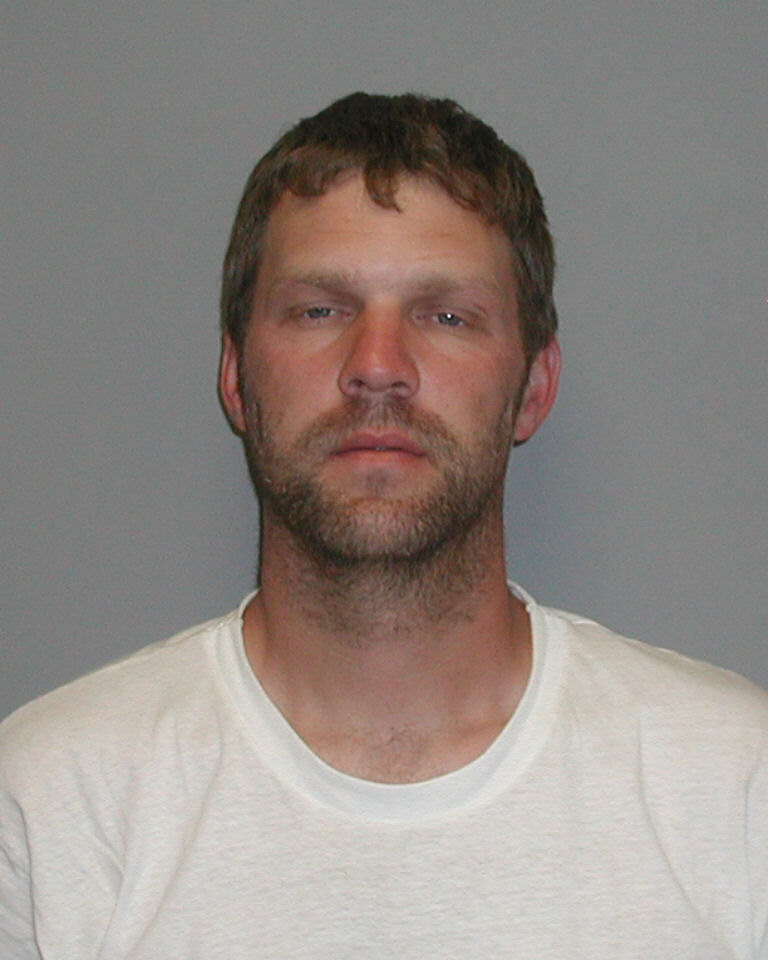
- FBI mugshot
- Born: Edward Davidson; July 29, 1972; Lakewood, Ohio, U.S.
- Died: July 24, 2008 (aged 35); Bennett, Colorado, U.S.
- Cause of death: Suicide by gunshot
- Education: Self-taught
- Occupation: E-mail spammer
- Spouse: Amy LeeAnn Hill
- Children: 3
- Status: Deceased
- Conviction: Violations of CAN SPAM Act
- Penalty: 21 months' imprisonment, $714,139 in fines, forfeiture of personal property

Edward Davidson (July 29, 1972 – July 24, 2008), also known as "Fast Eddie" and "the Spam King," was an American spammer who from July 5, 2002, through April 15, 2007, conducted a Colorado business using the name Power Promoters. The primary nature of Davidson's business consisted of providing promotional services for companies by sending large volumes of unsolicited commercial electronic messages ("spamming"). The spamming was designed to promote the visibility and sale of products offered by various companies. Davidson utilized the services and assistance of other individuals whom he hired as "sub-contractors" to provide spamming at his direction on behalf of his client companies. After escaping from a federal prison camp, he was found dead on July 24, 2008, after killing his wife and daughter.

== Spamming operations ==
Throughout 2002 through the middle of 2005, Davidson's spamming activities were provided on behalf of companies to promote watches, perfume, and other items. Beginning in the middle of 2005 through 2006, Davidson sent spam on behalf of a Texas company for purposes of promoting the sale of the company's stock. The company generated its income through selling low-value stock on behalf of small companies on the public market. Davidson, aided by several sub-spammers, sent hundreds of thousands of unsolicited e-mail messages touting the penny stock as an excellent investment to potential purchasers throughout the United States and the world. Davidson possessed hundreds of thousands of e-mail addresses, which he and his sub-spammers would use to send e-mail messages. Such e-mail messages contained false header information, which concealed the actual sender from the recipient of the e-mail. Davidson provided spammed messages for approximately 19 companies. Davidson operated his spamming activities from his personal residence in Bennett, Colorado, where he had a large network of computers and servers, which facilitated his business.

== Court proceedings ==
Davidson was indicted by a federal grand jury on June 5, 2007, for violating the CAN SPAM Act. He pleaded guilty in U.S. District Court before Judge Marcia S. Krieger on December 3, 2007. On April 28, 2008, Davidson was sentenced by Krieger to serve 21 months in federal prison. Judge Krieger also ordered him to pay $714,139 in restitution to the Internal Revenue Service (IRS). As part of the restitution, Davis agreed to forfeit property, including gold coins, which he purchased with the proceeds of his activities. At the time of sentencing Judge Krieger ordered Davidson to report to a facility designated by the Federal Bureau of Prisons on May 27, 2008.

This case was investigated by the Federal Bureau of Investigation (FBI) Denver field office, and the IRS Criminal Investigation Division. Assistant U.S. Attorney Tim Neff prosecuted the case.

== Incarceration ==
Davidson was assigned Inmate Number 35082-013 and housed in a minimum-security part of the Florence Federal Correctional Complex in Florence, Colorado.

== Escape and death ==
Davidson walked away from a federal prison camp in Florence on July 20, 2008. He was subsequently found dead in Arapahoe County, Colorado, on the morning of July 24, 2008, after killing his wife and three-year-old daughter who was strapped to a car seat, in an apparent murder–suicide. His 16-year-old daughter was also shot, but survived, while his 7-month-old son remained unharmed.

== See also ==
- List of spammers
