= Platteville, Colorado =

Town in Colorado, United States

- Town
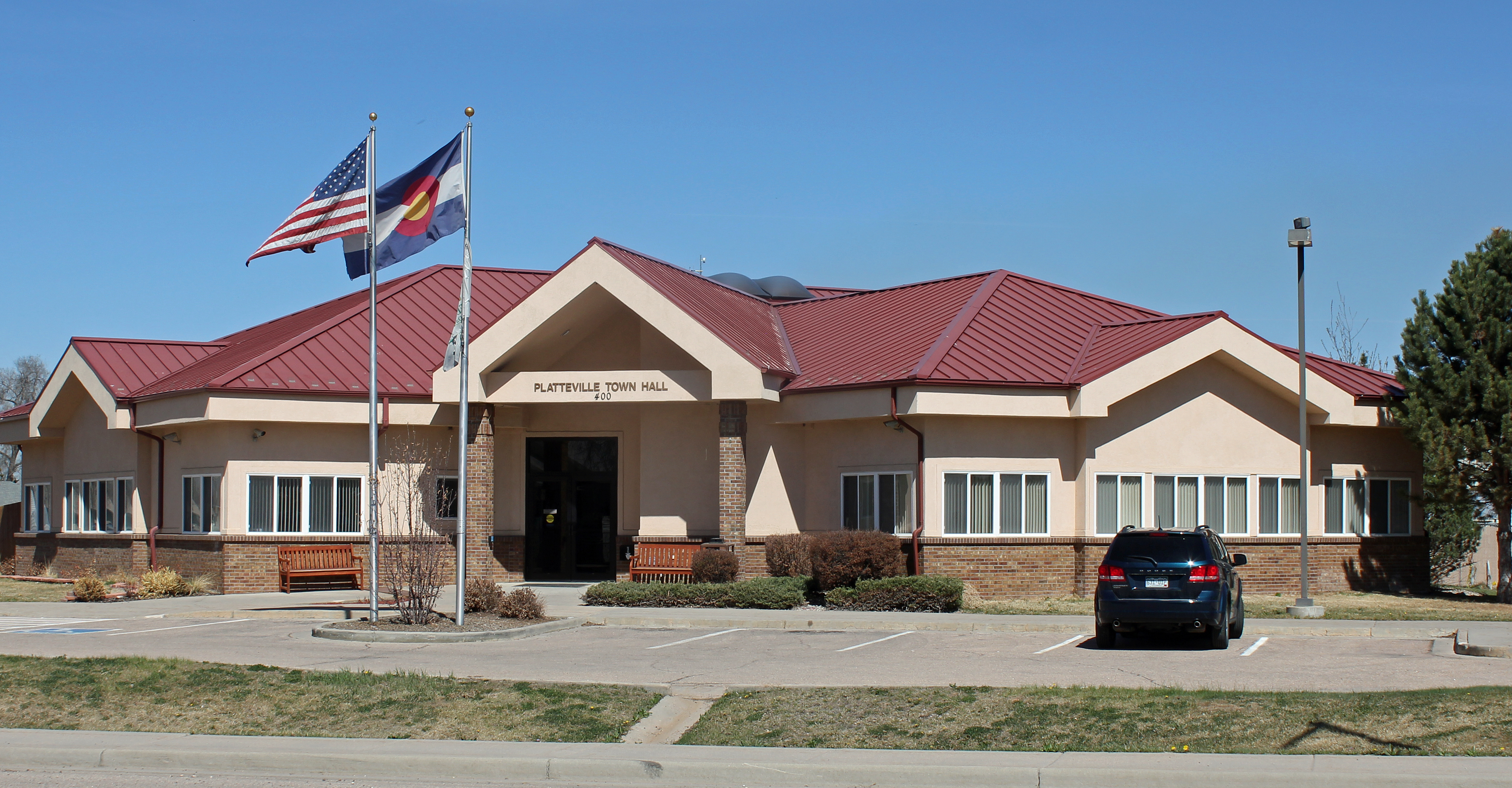
- Platteville Town Hall
- Motto: "Small Town Atmosphere, Big Town Vision"
- Location of Platteville in Weld County, Colorado
- Coordinates: 40°13′48″N 104°51′47″W
- Country: United States
- State: Colorado
- County: Weld
- Founded: 1871
- Incorporated (town): January 1, 1887

Government
  - Type: Statutory Town

Area
  - Total: 3.08 sq mi (7.99 km^{2})
  - Land: 3.07 sq mi (7.96 km^{2})
  - Water: 0.012 sq mi (0.03 km^{2})
- Elevation: 4,803 ft (1,464 m)

Population (2020)
  - Total: 2,955
  - Density: 961/sq mi (371/km^{2})
- Time zone: UTC−7 (Mountain (MST))
  - Summer (DST): UTC−6 (MDT)
- ZIP code: 80651
- Area code: 970
- FIPS code: 08-60160
- GNIS feature ID: 2412489
- Website: platteville.colorado.gov

Platteville is a statutory town in Weld County, Colorado, United States. The population was 2,955 at the 2020 census. It is adjacent to Fort Vasquez on U.S. Highway 85.

== History ==
Platteville was founded on May 27, 1871, and was incorporated on January 1, 1887. The town was named for its location on the Platte River.

== Geography ==
The town is situated along the east bank of the South Platte River at the intersection of U.S. Highway 85 and State Highway 66.

The Fort St. Vrain Generating Station, originally a nuclear power plant and now operating as a natural gas powered electricity generating facility operated by Xcel Energy, is approximately one-quarter-mile northwest of Platteville.

According to the United States Census Bureau, Platteville has a total area of 2.527 square miles (6.54 km^{2}), all of it land.

== Demographics ==
Historical population
Census	Pop.	Note	%±
1890	213		—
1900	263		23.5%
1910	430		63.5%
1920	479		11.4%
1930	533		11.3%
1940	561		5.3%
1950	570		1.6%
1960	582		2.1%
1970	683		17.4%
1980	1,662		143.3%
1990	1,515		−8.8%
2000	2,370		56.4%
2010	2,485		4.9%
2020	2,955		18.9%

=== 2020 census ===
As of the 2020 census, Platteville had a population of 2,955. The median age was 34.5 years. 27.2% of residents were under the age of 18 and 11.4% of residents were 65 years of age or older. For every 100 females there were 106.8 males, and for every 100 females age 18 and over there were 101.3 males age 18 and over.

0.0% of residents lived in urban areas, while 100.0% lived in rural areas.

There were 993 households in Platteville, of which 41.0% had children under the age of 18 living in them. Of all households, 56.3% were married-couple households, 16.9% were households with a male householder and no spouse or partner present, and 20.8% were households with a female householder and no spouse or partner present. About 18.8% of all households were made up of individuals and 6.5% had someone living alone who was 65 years of age or older.

There were 1,034 housing units, of which 4.0% were vacant. The homeowner vacancy rate was 1.4% and the rental vacancy rate was 4.0%.

Racial composition as of the 2020 census
Race	Number	Percent
White	1,825	61.8%
Black or African American	10	0.3%
American Indian and Alaska Native	53	1.8%
Asian	19	0.6%
Native Hawaiian and Other Pacific Islander	1	0.0%
Some other race	519	17.6%
Two or more races	528	17.9%
Hispanic or Latino (of any race)	1,279	43.3%

=== 2010 census ===
At the 2010 census there were 2,485 people, 951 households, and 935 families residing in Platteville. The population density was 1,606.5 inhabitants per square mile (620.3/km^{2}). There were 819 dwelling units at an average density of 555.1 per square mile (214.3/km^{2}). The racial makeup of Platteville was 73.84% White, 0.55% Native American, 0.30% Asian, 0.17% Pacific Islander, 22.24% from other races, and 2.91% from two or more races. Hispanic or Latino of any race were 35.19%.

=== 2000 census ===
Of the 786 households 45.4% had children under the age of 18 living with them, 61.6% were married couples living together, 10.1% had a female householder with no husband present, and 24.4% were non-families. 18.1% of households were one person and 5.3% were one person aged 65 or older. The average household size was 3.02 and the average family size was 3.50.

The age distribution was: 32.8% under the age of 18, 9.7% from 18 to 24, 32.3% from 25 to 44, 18.7% from 45 to 64, and 6.5% 65 or older. The median age was 30 years. For every 100 females, there were 103.6 males. For every 100 females age 18 and over, there were 99.5 males.

The median household income was in Platteville was $43,472, and the median family income was $47,574. Males had a median income of $34,048 versus $25,430 for females. The per capita income for Platteville was $15,802. About 6.9% of families and 8.7% of the population were below the poverty line, including 9.6% of those under age 18 and 5.5% of those age 65 or over.

== Arts and culture ==
=== Annual cultural events ===
Platteville celebrates the harvest season every August since 1910. The name of the harvest festival has changed many times over the years, and is currently called Harvest Daze.

== See also ==
- North Central Colorado Urban Area
- Platteville Atmospheric Observatory
