= Prospect Valley, Colorado =

- Populated Place
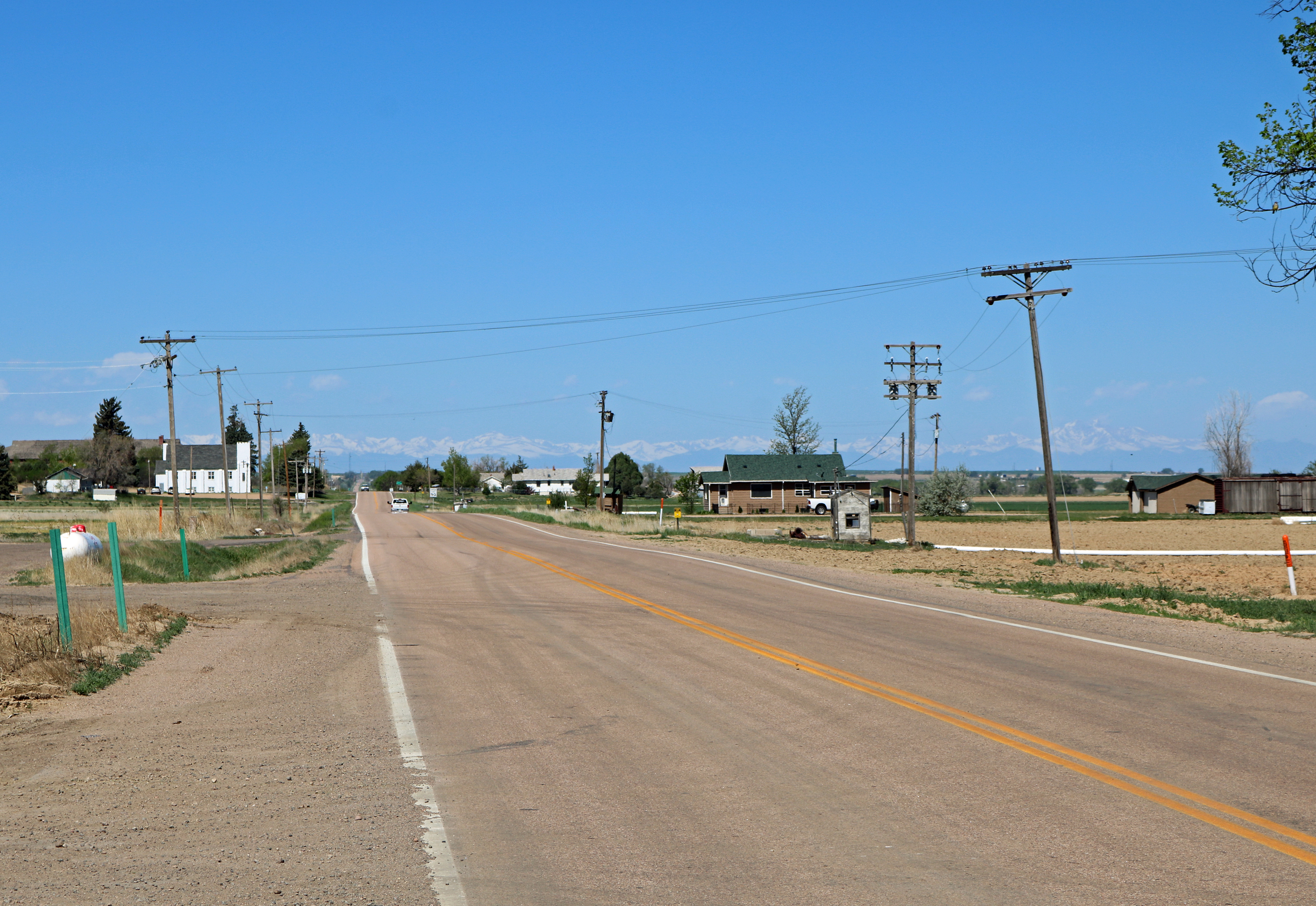
- Prospect Valley, looking west along State Highway 52.
- Interactive map of Prospect Valley, Colorado
- Coordinates: 40°04′25″N 104°24′54″W
- Country: United States
- State: Colorado
- County: Weld
- Elevation: 4,846 ft (1,477 m)
- Time zone: UTC-7 (MST)
  - Summer (DST): UTC-6 (MDT)
- ZIP code: 80643 (Keenesburg)
- GNIS feature ID: 180877

Prospect Valley is a populated place in Weld County, Colorado, United States. The Post Office at Keenesburg serves the Prospect Valley postal address. SH 52 runs east and west through the community.

== Geography ==
Prospect Valley is located along State Highway 52, 11 miles east of Keenesburg.
