= Watkins, Colorado =

Census-designated place in Colorado, USA

- Census-designated place
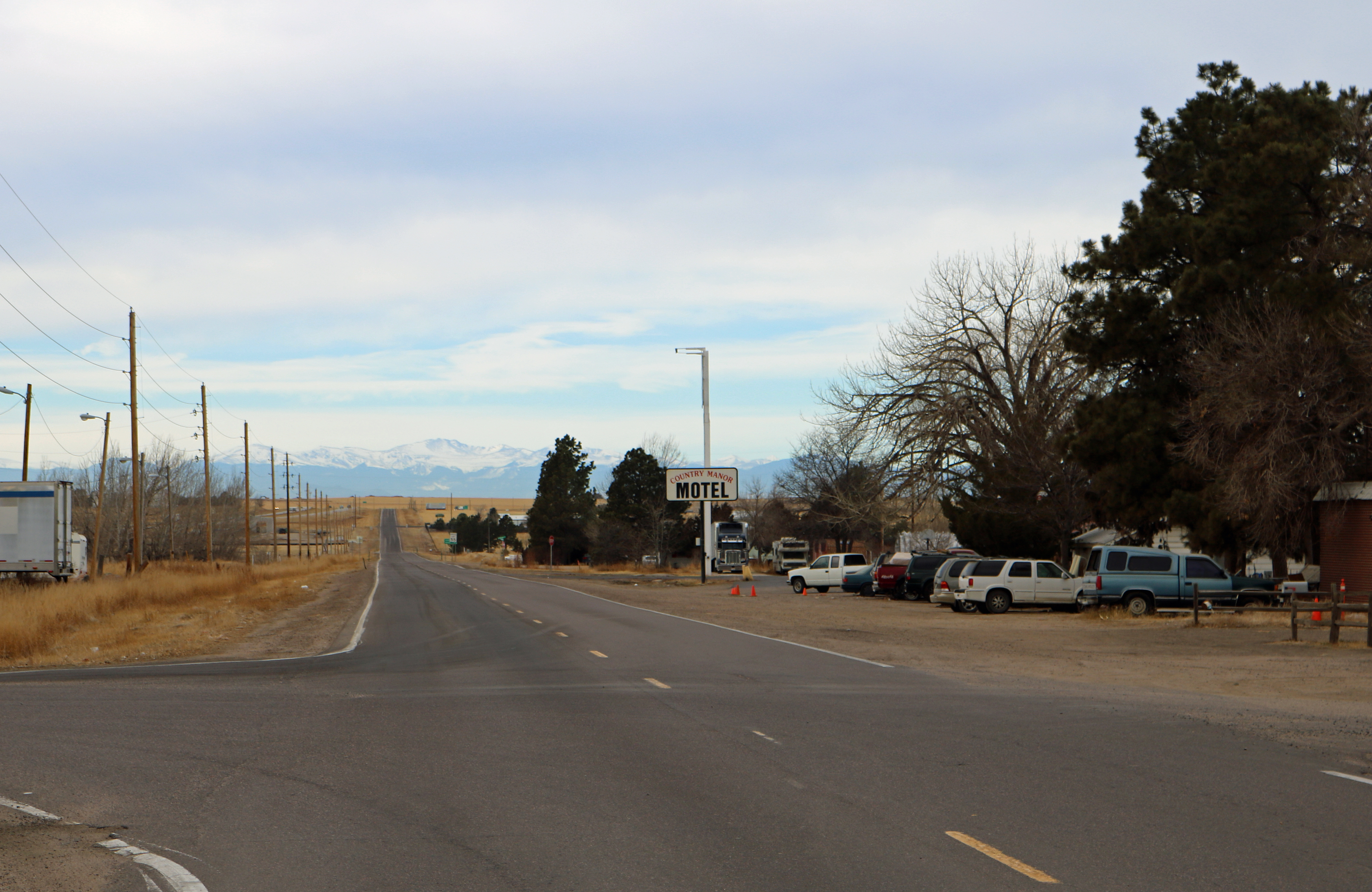
- Watkins, looking west along Colfax Avenue.

- Location of the Watkins CDP in Adams County and Arapahoe County, Colorado.
- Coordinates: 39°43′24″N 104°35′26″W
- Country: United States
- State: Colorado
- Counties: Adams & Arapahoe

Government
  - Type: unincorporated town

Area
  - Total: 24.753 sq mi (64.109 km^{2})
  - Land: 24.753 sq mi (64.109 km^{2})
  - Water: 7.7×10^{−5} sq mi (0.0002 km^{2})
- Elevation: 5,653 ft (1,723 m)

Population (2020)
  - Total: 682
  - Density: 27.6/sq mi (10.6/km^{2})
- Time zone: UTC-7 (MST)
  - Summer (DST): UTC-6 (MDT)
- ZIP Code: 80137
- Area codes: 303 & 720
- GNIS feature ID: 2583314

Watkins (also called Box Elder) is an unincorporated town and a census-designated place (CDP) located in and governed by Arapahoe and Adams counties, Colorado, United States. The CDP is a part of the Denver–Aurora–Lakewood, CO Metropolitan Statistical Area. The census-designated place borders Aurora, and the Watkins post office, which lies within the Aurora city limits, has the ZIP Code 80137. At the United States Census 2020, the population of the Watkins CDP was 682.

== History ==
The Watkins post office has been in operation since 1878. The community was named after L. A. Watkins, a cattleman.

=== Late 19th Century ===
By the 1890s, the local economy was largely defined by dry farming, cattle, and sheep ranching. Due to the arid environment, water rights were a significant concern for the community; early residents frequently engaged in legal disputes regarding land condemnation for irrigation ditches to sustain livestock. The difficult conditions of "dry ranching" on the plains often led to financial hardships for local settlers, particularly during drought years.

Attempts were also made to commercialize the area's natural resources. In 1893, the Ponce de Leon Mineral Water Company operated out of Watkins, marketing the local water in Denver newspapers as a "Fountain of Youth."

=== Skyline Airport ===
In the early 1960s, local wheat farmer Jeff Drohan established Skyline Airport as a personal "do-it-yourself" project to address the lack of private aircraft facilities in the Denver metropolitan area. Drohan financed the construction entirely with his own funds, converting a portion of his wheat fields three miles north of Watkins into an airfield. He constructed three runways, the longest measuring 5,200 feet, and a hangar before passing Federal Aviation Agency inspection in January 1964. The airport was located approximately three miles north of Watkins and 15 miles east of Stapleton International Airport.

Throughout the 1960s, the airport operated as a hub for flight training and general aviation. It hosted several flight schools, including Wang Air Service, the Academy of Aviation, and Skyline Airways, which provided ground schools, aircraft rentals, and charter services.

The airport also served as a venue for community events. In August 1964, a large air show sponsored by Safeway attracted visitors with aerial demonstrations, a United Airlines jet fly-by, and antique aircraft displays. The field was frequently used by the Colorado chapter of the Antique Airplane Association for competitions and by the Colorado Wing of the Civil Air Patrol for civil defense exercises.

As an active training facility, the airport saw occasional aviation accidents, including a 1966 crash where a Cessna 172 overshot a runway and crossed a county road. By the mid-1970s, businesses at the airport had shifted to include specialized services such as aircraft refinishing and painting. The airport closed by 1980.

=== 21st Century ===
Long an unincorporated community, Watkins incorporated as a town on June 15, 2004. However, on November 7, 2006, the town voted to revert to being an unincorporated community by a margin of 308-184.

Watkins is involved in trying to build the First Park in Adams County, and the Watkins Historical Preservation Society is co-operating with the town on some historical buildings for installation in the park as well. Colorado Air and Space Port is located near Watkins.

== Geography ==
The Watkins CDP has an area of 15,842 acres (64.109 km^{2}), including 0.049 acres (0.0002 km^{2}) of water.

== Demographics ==
The United States Census Bureau initially defined the Watkins CDP for the United States Census 2010.

Watkins CDP, Colorado
Year	Pop.	±%
2010	653	—
2020	682	+4.4%
Source: United States Census Bureau

== Education ==
Most of the CDP is in Bennett School District 29-J. Some of it is in Adams-Arapahoe School District 28J.

The portion of Watkins in Adams-Arapahoe 28J is zoned to: Harmony P-8 School, and Vista PEAK Preparatory School.

== See also ==
- Front Range Urban Corridor
