= National Register of Historic Places listings in Morgan County, Colorado =

Location of Morgan County in Colorado

This is a list of the National Register of Historic Places listings in Morgan County, Colorado.

This is intended to be a complete list of the properties and districts on the National Register of Historic Places in Morgan County, Colorado, United States. The locations of National Register properties and districts for which the latitude and longitude coordinates are included below, may be seen in a map.

There are 16 properties and districts listed on the National Register in the county.

This National Park Service list is complete through NPS recent listings posted August 28, 2026.

== Current listings ==
	Name on the Register	Image	Date listed	Location	City or town	Description
1	All Saints Church of Eben Ezer	All Saints Church of Eben Ezer	June 3, 1982 (#82002310)	120 Hospital Rd. 40°15′15″N 103°38′38″W	Brush	
2	Antelope Springs Methodist Episcopal Church	Antelope Springs Methodist Episcopal Church	December 3, 2013 (#13000872)	Address Restricted	Snyder	
3	Central Platoon School	Central Platoon School	November 5, 2001 (#01001194)	411 Clayton St. 40°15′29″N 103°37′20″W	Brush	
4	Farmers State Bank Building	Farmers State Bank Building	September 13, 1990 (#90001422)	300 Main St. 40°15′00″N 103°48′02″W	Fort Morgan	
5	Fort Morgan City Hall	Fort Morgan City Hall	November 22, 1995 (#95001339)	110 Main St. 40°14′52″N 103°48′04″W	Fort Morgan	Well-built Classical Revival City Hall and multi-purpose building, designed by Denver architects Marean and Norton and completed in 1908.
6	Fort Morgan Power Plant Building	Fort Morgan Power Plant Building	January 28, 1994 (#93001553)	Eastern side of N. Main St., north of its junction with U.S. Highway 6; 40°15′56″N 103°48′02″W	Fort Morgan	
7	Fort Morgan State Armory	Fort Morgan State Armory	June 16, 2004 (#04000596)	528 State St. 40°15′13″N 103°47′57″W	Fort Morgan	
8	German Evangelical Immanuel Congregational Church	German Evangelical Immanuel Congregational Church	October 14, 2005 (#05001161)	209 Everett St. 40°15′35″N 103°37′13″W	Brush	
9	Knearl School	Knearl School	January 31, 1997 (#97000017)	314 S. Clayton St. 40°15′02″N 103°37′23″W	Brush	
10	Lincoln School	Lincoln School	April 27, 2010 (#10000216)	914 State St. 40°15′30″N 103°48′01″W	Fort Morgan	
11	Morgan County Courthouse and Jail	Morgan County Courthouse and Jail	April 1, 2002 (#02000289)	225 Ensign and 218 W. Kiowa; 40°14′59″N 103°48′10″W	Fort Morgan	
12	Old Trail School	Old Trail School	April 20, 2004 (#04000337)	421 High St. 40°13′34″N 104°04′18″W	Wiggins	
13	Rainbow Arch Bridge	Rainbow Arch Bridge	February 4, 1985 (#85000221)	State Highway 52; 40°16′09″N 103°48′02″W	Fort Morgan	
14	Rankin Presbyterian Church	Rankin Presbyterian Church	July 18, 2007 (#07000696)	420 Clayton St. 40°15′30″N 103°37′23″W	Brush	
15	Sherman Street Historic Residential District	Sherman Street Historic Residential District	September 10, 1987 (#87001286)	400 and 500 blocks of Sherman St. 40°15′06″N 103°47′26″W	Fort Morgan	
16	US Post Office-Fort Morgan Main	US Post Office-Fort Morgan Main	January 22, 1986 (#86000177)	300 State St. 40°14′57″N 103°47′58″W	Fort Morgan	

== See also ==
- List of National Historic Landmarks in Colorado
- List of National Register of Historic Places in Colorado
- Bibliography of Colorado
- Geography of Colorado
- History of Colorado
- Index of Colorado-related articles
- List of Colorado-related lists
- Outline of Colorado
