= National Register of Historic Places listings in Logan County, Colorado =

Location of Logan County in Colorado

This is a list of the National Register of Historic Places listings in Logan County, Colorado.

This is intended to be a complete list of the properties and districts on the National Register of Historic Places in Logan County, Colorado, United States. The locations of National Register properties and districts for which the latitude and longitude coordinates are included below, may be seen in a map.

There are 12 properties and districts listed on the National Register in the county.

This National Park Service list is complete through NPS recent listings posted August 28, 2026.

== Current listings ==
	Name on the Register	Image	Date listed	Location	City or town	Description
1	Downtown Sterling Historic District	Downtown Sterling Historic District	August 13, 2013 (#13000592)	Bounded by Division Ave., Poplar, Front, Ash and 4th Sts. 40°37′26″N 103°12′36″W	Sterling	
2	First United Presbyterian Church	First United Presbyterian Church	June 3, 1982 (#82002304)	130 S. 4th St. 40°37′25″N 103°12′37″W	Sterling	
3	W.C. Harris House	W.C. Harris House	May 17, 1984 (#84000864)	102 Taylor St. 40°37′08″N 103°12′38″W	Sterling	
4	I and M Building	I and M Building	June 3, 1982 (#82002305)	223 Main St. 40°37′25″N 103°12′28″W	Sterling	
5	Logan County Courthouse	Logan County Courthouse	February 28, 1979 (#79000615)	Main St. 40°37′25″N 103°12′32″W	Sterling	
6	Conrad Luft Sr. House	Conrad Luft Sr. House	May 17, 1984 (#84000866)	1429 State Highway 14; 40°37′29″N 103°14′03″W	Sterling	Queen Anne-style house which was moved in 1925
7	Pantall Elementary School	Pantall Elementary School	July 14, 2015 (#15000409)	1215 N. 5th St. 40°38′15″N 103°12′21″W	Sterling	Now called Stevens School.
8	Powell and Blair Stone Ranch	Powell and Blair Stone Ranch	April 6, 2004 (#04000261)	Approximately 1 mile north of the junction of U.S. Route 138 and 65 Rd. 40°48′55″N 102°57′03″W	Proctor	
9	St. Anthony's Roman Catholic Church	St. Anthony's Roman Catholic Church	June 3, 1982 (#82002306)	329 S. 3rd St. 40°37′14″N 103°12′36″W	Sterling	
10	Sterling Public Library	Sterling Public Library	October 20, 2001 (#01001121)	210 S. 4th St. 40°37′23″N 103°12′38″W	Sterling	
11	Sterling Union Pacific Railroad Depot	Sterling Union Pacific Railroad Depot	February 6, 1986 (#86000210)	113 N. Front St. 40°37′29″N 103°12′15″W	Sterling	
12	US Post Office, Federal Building, and Federal Courthouse-Sterling Main	US Post Office, Federal Building, and Federal Courthouse-Sterling Main	January 22, 1986 (#86000187)	3rd and Popular Sts. 40°37′29″N 103°12′27″W	Sterling	

== See also ==
- List of National Historic Landmarks in Colorado
- List of National Register of Historic Places in Colorado
- Bibliography of Colorado
- Geography of Colorado
- History of Colorado
- Index of Colorado-related articles
- List of Colorado-related lists
- Outline of Colorado
