= Old Trail School =

Old Trail School may refer to:

- Old Trail School (Wiggins, Colorado)
- Old Trail School (Bath, Ohio)
