= Filbeck Building =

Historic building in Denver, Colorado

Coordinates: 39°44′46″N 104°59′41″W

- Interactive map of the Filbeck Building area

General information
- Location: 1527 Champa Street
- Construction started: 1917

Design and construction
- Architect: John J. Huddart

The Filbeck Building is a historic 1917 building in Denver, Colorado, designed by architect John J. Huddart. Located at 1527 Champa Street, it is next to the Roger & Son Mortuary/Yankee Dollar Building. It has been home to the Champa Bar, the Changing Scene Theater, and the Bovine Metropolis Theater.
