= John J. Huddart =

American architect (1856–1930)

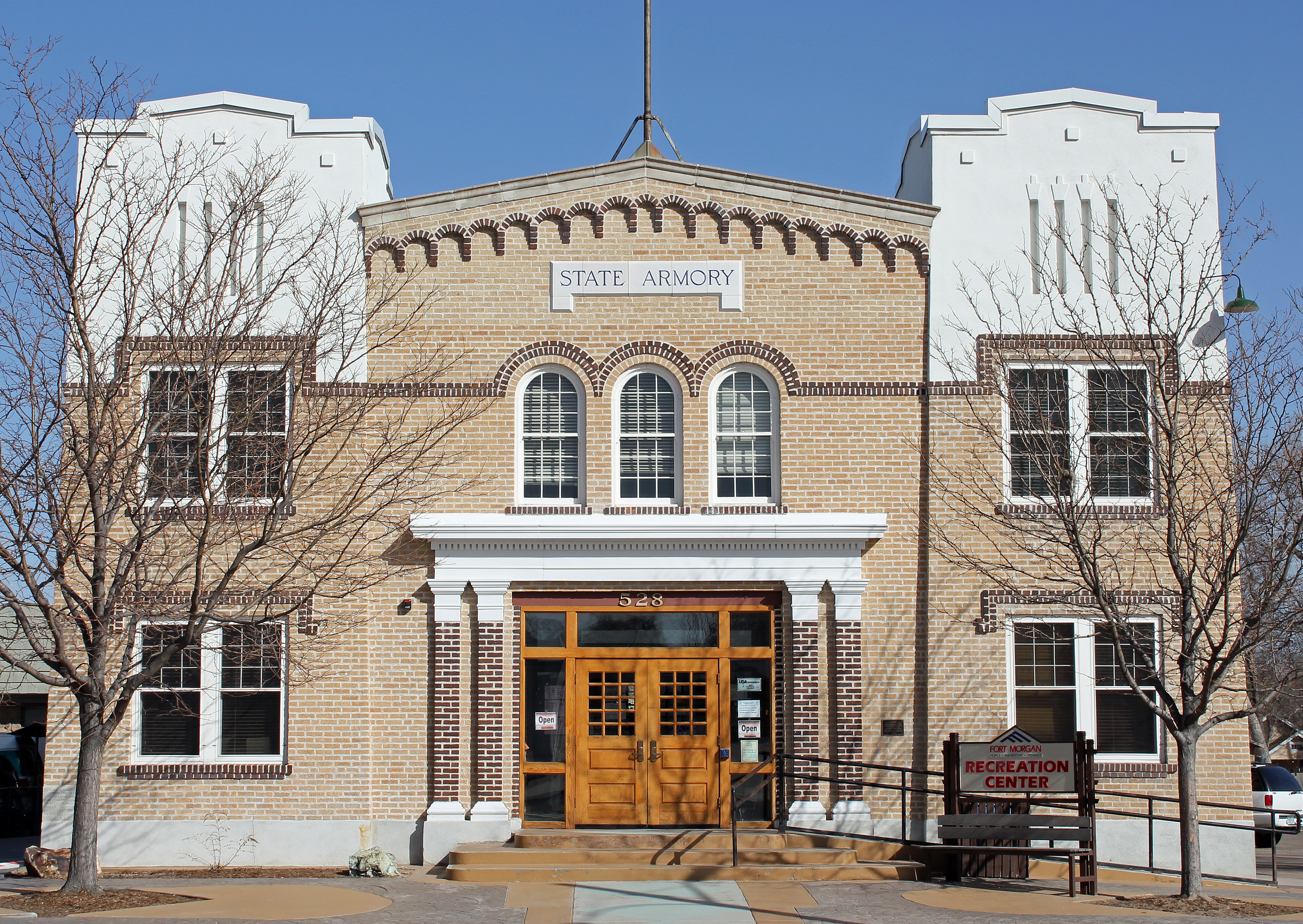
Fort Morgan State Armory, being used as a recreation centre

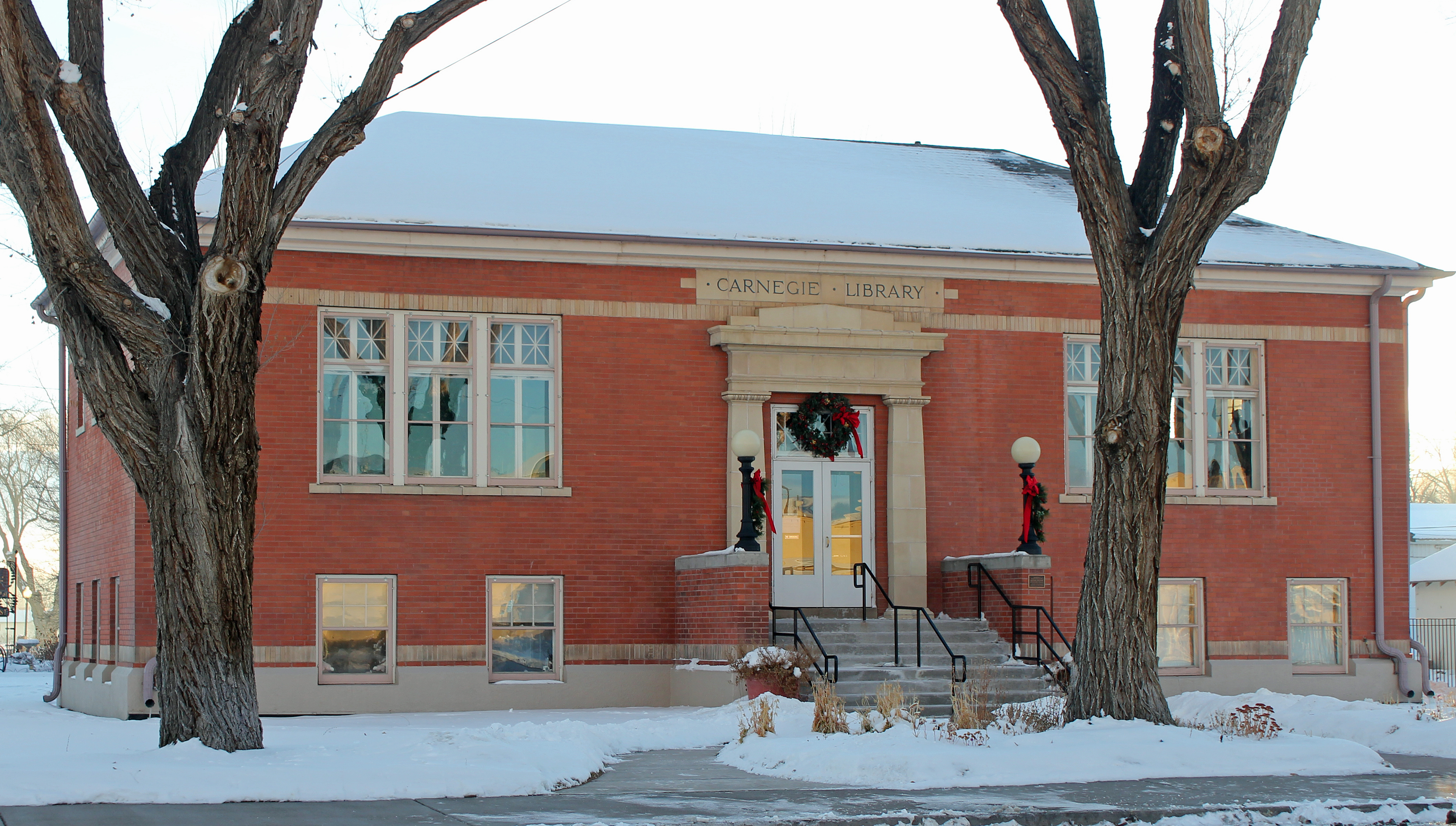
Carnegie Librar, Monte Vista Branch

John James Huddart (25 August 1856 – 1930), known usually as John J. Huddart, was a British born and trained architect who practised out of Denver, Colorado in the United States. At the end of the Nineteenth century he was one of Denver's leading architects, known for his work on public buildings and as a courthouse architect.

He worked for the Catholic Church's Denver Archdiocese designing Denver's St. Thomas Theological Seminary and the Hotel St. Nicholas (1898), dedicated as a general hospital to serve Cripple Creek, Colorado and the surrounding area during the height of the 1890s gold rush. His original architectural drawings for the Hotel St. Nicholas (drawn in 1896) are displayed in the hotel's main lobby of the Cripple Creek Hotel. He also designed Murchison School (1902) in South Carolina. He designed the El Cortez Apartments at 608 East 12th Avenue in Denver Colorado 80203.

Huddart is known for his Classical Revival and Richardsonian Romanesque style designs. A retrospective of his work, Architecture of John J. Huddart, Architect was published in 1907 and included his work in Colorado cities; Salt Lake City, Utah; Alva, Oklahoma; Rawlins, Wyoming; and Bennettsville, South Carolina. His practice lasted from 1882 to 1930 and commissions included Charles Boettcher House in Denver, Colorado's Fort Morgan State Armory, Denver's Filbeck Building, and six of Colorado's county courthouses.

== Early life ==
Huddart was born in Preston, Lancashire, England on 25 August 1856. He received his advanced education at Alston College in England, graduating at 19. He apprenticed at J.C. Fill & Co. and with Hayward Tyler Engineering Co. before moving to Pernambuco, Brazil in South America to design a sugar refinery. He then emigrated to Jacksonville, Florida, and before moving on to Denver within the same year (1882).

In Denver, he worked as chief draftsman Frank Edbrooke's office from 1882 until 1887, when he established his own practice. Huddart created a standard armoury design in the early 1920s and it was used for the construction of twelve armoury buildings across Colorado.

== Courthouse work ==
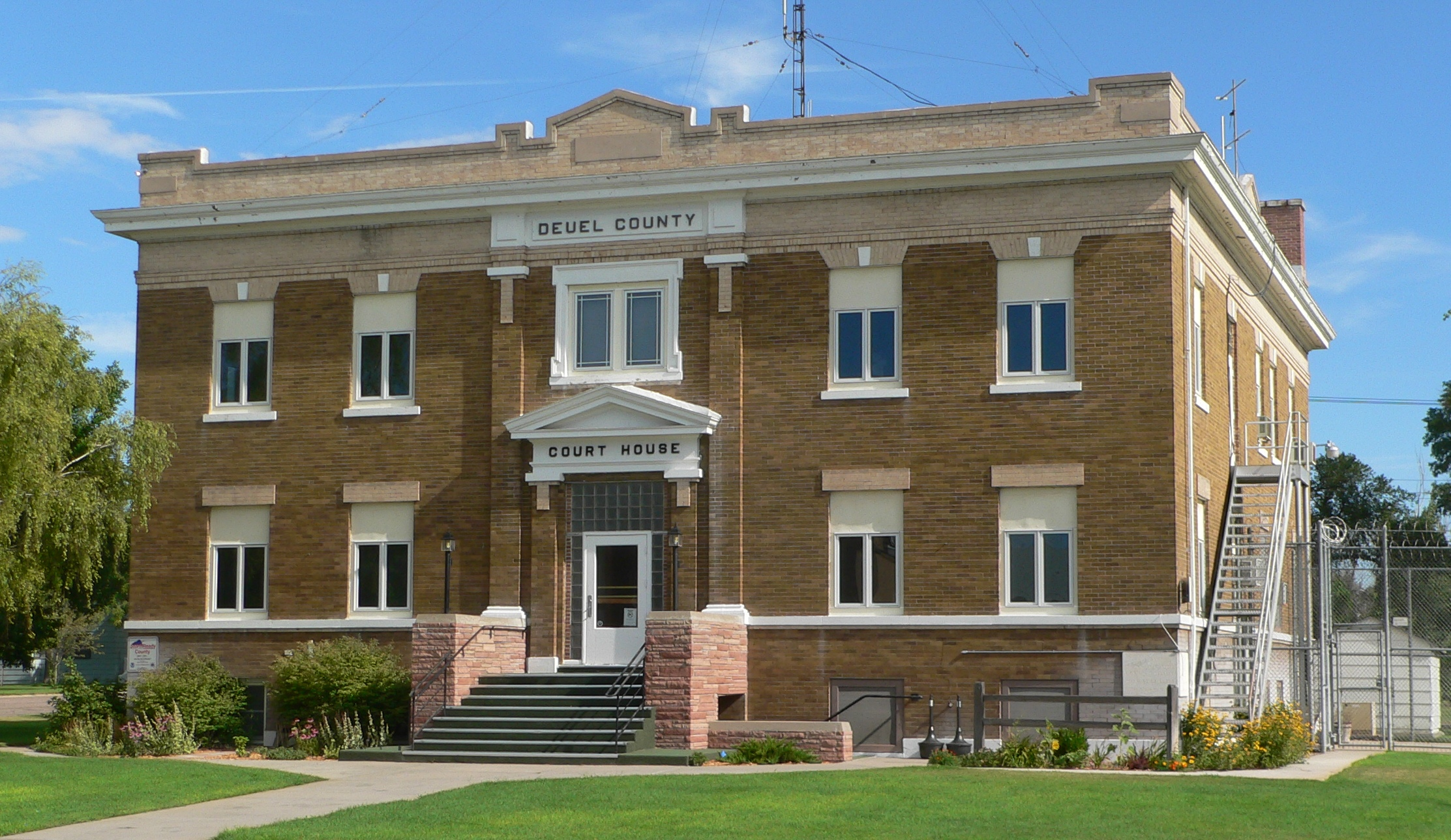
Deuel County Courthouse, Nebraska

His work on courthouses began in 1905 with the Adams County Courthouse in Brighton, Colorado and continued with the Cheyenne County Courthouse (1908), listed on the National Register of Historic Places; the Washington County Courthouse (1908–10); Logan County Courthouse (1908–10), listed on the National Register of Historic Places; Summit County Courthouse (1909); Saguache County Courthouse (1910) listed on the Colorado Register of Historic Places; and the Elbert County Courthouse in 1912, as well as two final courthouse projects late in his career: Lincoln County Courthouse (1923) and Custer County Courthouse (1929).

He also designed the Deuel County Courthouse and the Garden County Courthouse in Nebraska.

== Other works ==
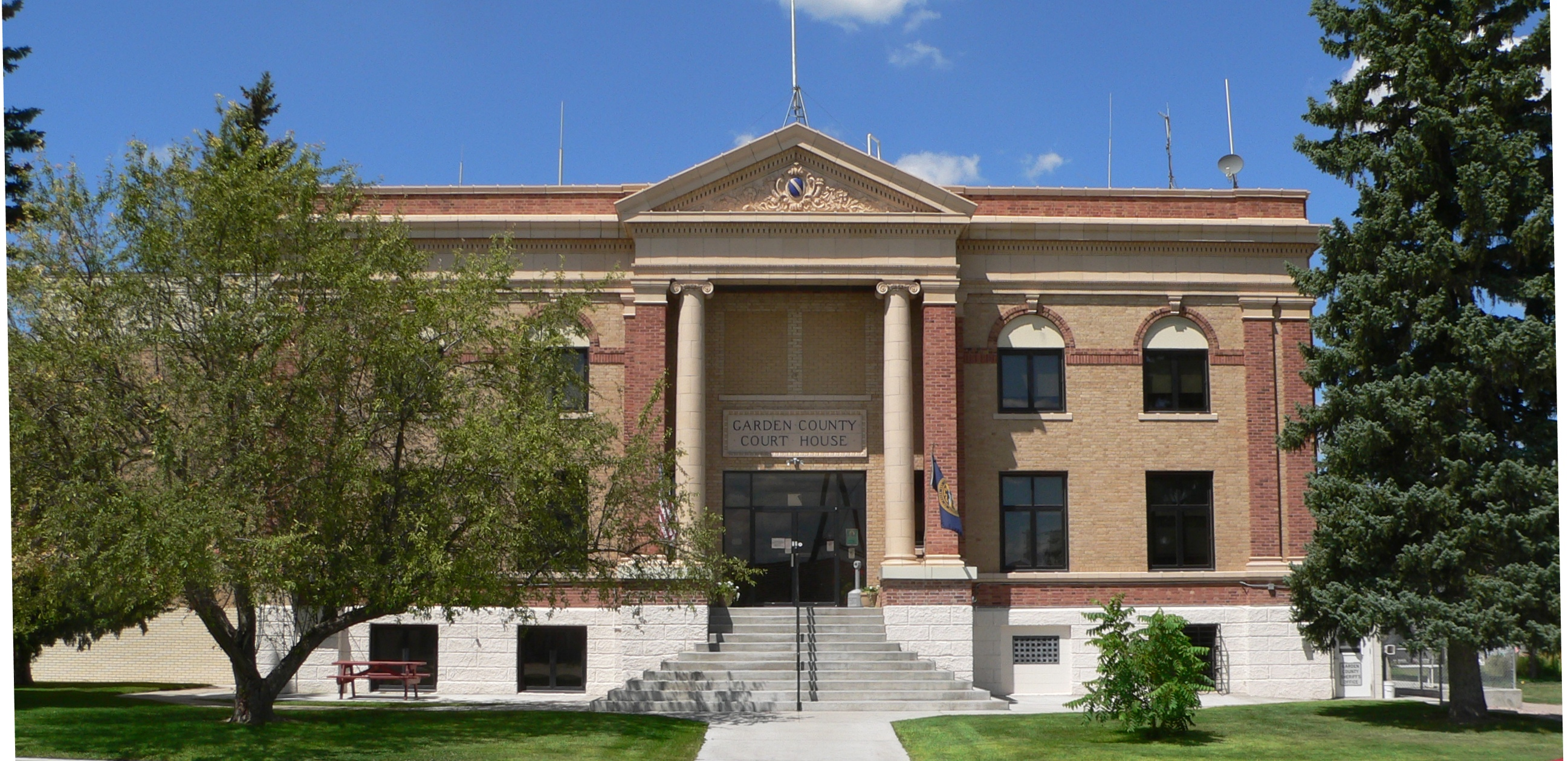
Garden County Courthouse, Nebraska

His work in Denver includes:

- Essex Building (1887, demolished)
- Bank Block (1889, demolished)
- Gold Mining Stock Exchange (1896) SOCIETY OF ARCHITECTURAL HISTORIANS in Cripple Creek, Colorado
- American National Bank Building (1901) in Leadville, Colorado

He is also credited with designing:

- Creswell Mansion (1889), listed on the National Register of Historic Places
- Kinneavy Terrace (1889–90)
- Carnegie Library in Monte Vista (1919), listed on the National Register of Historic Places
- Colorado State Armory in Craig (1922), listed on the National of Historic Places.

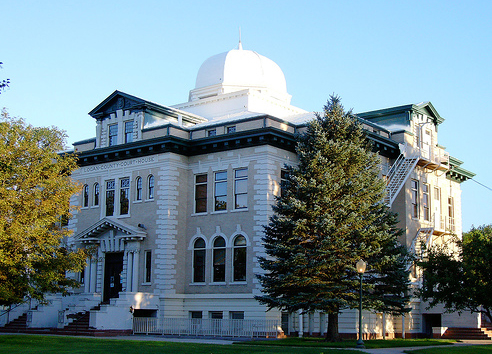
Logan County Courthouse (Colorado)

Additional buildings:

- Essex Building (Frank E. Edbrooke also credited with design) 1617 Lawrence St. in Denver (1887) Demolished.
- Bank Block Denver (1889) Demolished
- Creswell Mansion 1244 Grant St., Denver (1889) NRHP Listed
- Gilmore House at 2401 Emerson St. in Denver (1889)
- Unnamed Terrace 2502-04 Clarkson St., Denver (1889)
- Unnamed House 1347 Williams St. in Denver (1889) Demolished
- Big Chief Bottling Co. 1539 Platte. St., Denver 5DV536 1889–90
- Kinneavy Terrace 2700 Stout St., Denver 5DV103 (1889–90) in the Curtis Park Historic District
- Athelston Apartments Denver 1890 Demolished
- Huddart Terrace 625 E. 16th St., Denver 1890 (Denver Local Landmark)
- Armstrong House (with Jacobson) 2707 Humboldt St., Denver 5DV6997 1890
- Gross Barney Supply (with Jackson? Jacobson?) 1612 Wazee St., Denver
- Cole Lydon House 2418 Stout St., Denver 5DV103.15 1890 in the Curtis Park Historic District
- Swift Building in Pueblo (1890)
- Unnamed House at 1374 Race St., Denver 1890 Demolished
- Unnamed House at 1400 Gilpin St., Denver 1890 Wyman
- Stanley School 1301 Quebec St. in Denver (1891)
- Kittredge Castle/Holland Hall at 8 & 9th Aves. And Olive and Oneida Sts (1891) Demolished
- Horwitz Building (addition to (1891) building; rebuilt in 1892 following fire) 1630 Blake St. in Denver 5DV47.25 (1891) in Lower Downtown Certified Historic District
- Unnamed House 1259 York St., Denver (1891) Wyman (Local Historic District)
- William L. Stevens House Denver (1891) Demolished
- McClair Apartments Denver (1892) Demolished
- Unnamed House 2149 High St., Denver 5DV2189 (1892)
- Unnamed House 1440 Vine St., Denver (1892) Demolished
- E.W. Williams Mansion 1440 Williams St., Denver (1892–93) Wyman Local Historic District
- Milheim House 1515 Race St., Denver 5DV4898 1893 Wyman
- Charles M. Kittredge House E. 8th Ave. & Oneida St., Denver (1893) Demolished
- Elks Lodge/Gold Mining Stock Exchange Cripple Creek 373–379 E. Bennett Ave., Cripple Creek 5TL2.5 1896 Cripple Creek Historic District
- American National Bank, Leadville at Harrison Ave. & 5th St. in Leadville 5LK.40.24 1901 Leadville Historic District
- Marion Harper House 256 Bannock St. in Denver 5DV51.34Ba (1902)
- Fire Station No. 15, Denver 1080 Clayton St., Denver 5DV5639 (1903) Local Landmark
- Hotel St. Regis 1540–44 Welton St. in Denver 5DV502 (1905) Demolished
- Adams County Courthouse 22 S. 4th Ave. in Brighton 5AM92 (1905–06)
- Cheyenne County Courthouse at 51 S. First St. in Cheyenne Wells 5CH52 1908–09 Listed on the NRHP
- St. Thomas Theological Seminary
- Washington County Courthouse at 150 Ash Ave. in Akron 5WN94 (1908–1910) Listed on the Colorado State Register of Historic Places
- Logan County Courthouse at 315 Main St., Sterling 5LO35 (1908–1910) Listed on the NRHP
- Summit County Courthouse at 208 E. Lincoln in Breckenridge 5ST130 (1909–10) in the Breckenridge Historical District
- Saguache County Courthouse at 504 Fourth St., Saguache 5SH1392 (1910) Listed on the State Register
- Elbert County Courthouse at 215 Commanche St. in Kiowa 5EL199 1912
- Sterling City Hall at 214 Poplar St. in Sterling (1912)
- Akron High School Akron (1915) Demolished
- Sargent Consolidated School District – Elementary School Monte Vista vicinity 5RN689 (1917) State Register
- Filbeck Building 1527 Champa St., Denver 5DV489 (1917)
- Carnegie Library at 120 Jefferson St. in Monte Vista 5RN513 (1919) National Register Listed
- Queen of Heaven Orphanage at 4825 Federal Blvd. in Denver (1920) Demolished
- Sargent Consolidated School District – High School Monte Vista vicinity 5RN689 (1921) State Register Listed
- State Armory 300 Strong St., Brighton 5AM120 (1921)
- State Armory 363 Grand Ave., Delta 5DT440 (1921)
- State Armory (with Sidney Frazier) 614 8TH Ave., Greeley 5WL4108 (1921)
- Lincoln County Courthouse at 718 Third St., Hugo (1923) Demolished
- Edison Elementary School at 3350 Quitman St., in Denver 5DV635 (1925), a Denver Local Landmark
- Crested Butte High School at 5700 Maroon Ave. in Crested Butte 5GN3207 (1927)
- Custer County Courthouse at 205 S. 6th St. in Westcliffe (1929)
- Fort Lupton Library 453 First St., Ft. Lupton (1929)

Undated Buildings:

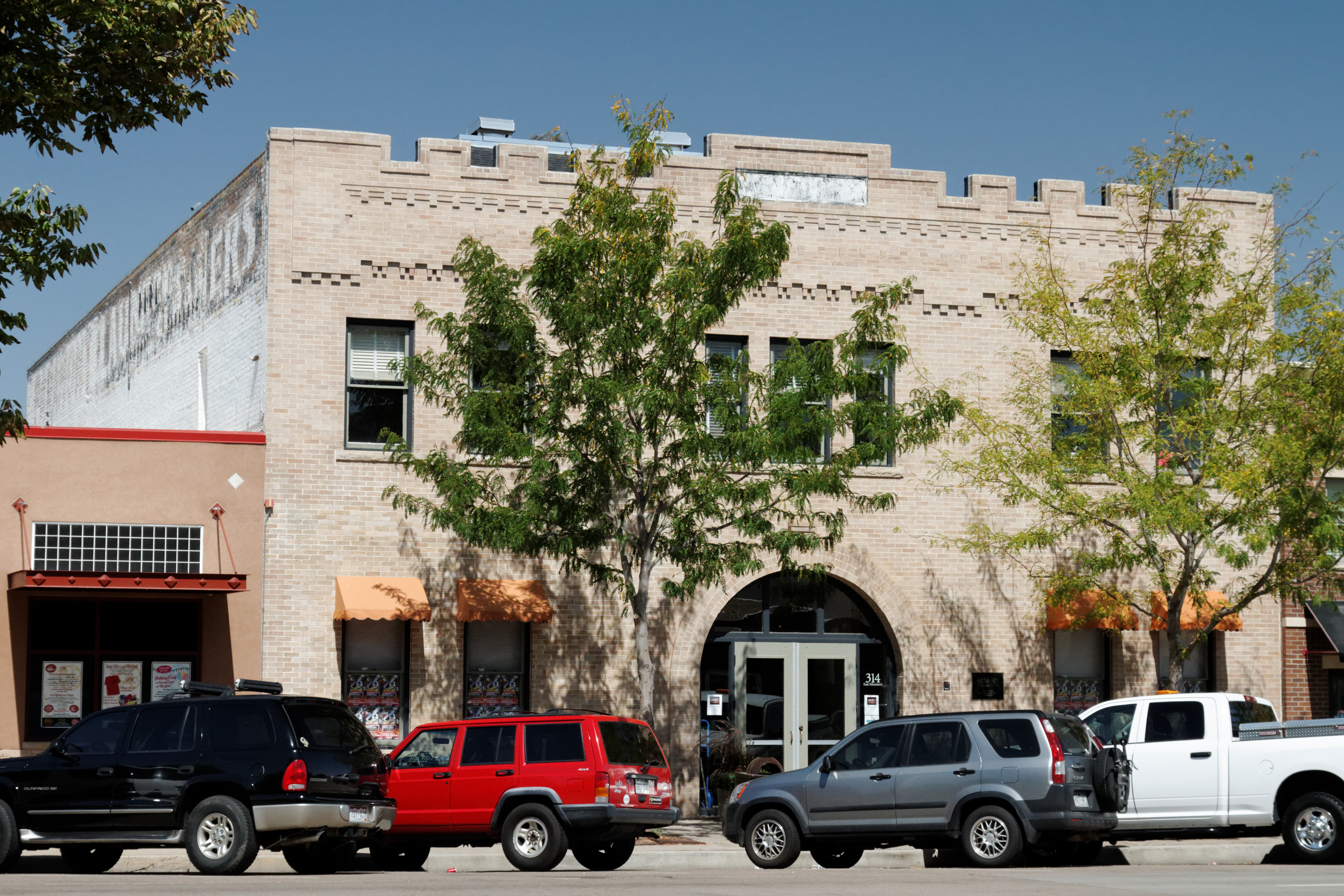
Fort Collins Armory

- State Armory, Brush
- State Armory, Cañon City
- State Armory, Fort Collins
- State Armory, Fort Morgan
- State Armory, Fruita
- State Armory, Lamar
- State Armory, Manzanola
- State Armory, Pueblo
- Arcade Building, Denver
- Charles Boettcher House 1201 Grant St., Denver Demolished
- Paris Building, Denver
- Gus Holmes Building in Salt Lake City, Utah
- Bank of Montrose Montrose
- School Building Englewood
- School Building Durango
- Unknown Building Colorado Springs
- Unknown Building Grand Junction
- Unknown Building Rico

National Register-listed works (with attribution that varies)

- Adams County Courthouse, 22 S 4th Ave., Brighton, Colorado (Huddart, John James)
- Canon City State Armory, 110 Main St., Canon City, Colorado (Huddart, John James)
- Carnegie Library (Monte Vista, Colorado), 120 Jefferson St., Monte Vista, Colorado (Huddart, John J.)
- Cheyenne County Courthouse, 51 S. 1st St., Cheyenne Wells, Colorado (Huddart, John James)
- Creswell Mansion, 1244 Grant St., Denver, Colorado (Huddart, J.J.)
- Deuel County Courthouse, 718 3rd St., Chappell, Nebraska (Huddart, John J.)
- Fort Morgan State Armory, 528 State St., Fort Morgan, Colorado (Huddart, John J.)
- Garden County Courthouse, F and Main Sts., Oshkosh, Nebraska (Huddart, John J.)
- Lincoln School (Fort Morgan, Colorado), 914 State St., Fort Morgan, Colorado (Huddart, John J.)
- Logan County Courthouse, Main St., Sterling, Colorado (Huddart, John J.)
- Stanley School-Montclair School, 1301 Quebec St., Denver, Colorado (Huddart, John James)
- State Armory, 590 Yampa Ave., Craig, Colorado (Huddart, John J.)
- Toltec Club, 602 Magoffin Ave., El Paso, Texas (Huddart, J.J.)

== Additional sources ==
- Brettell, Richard R. Historic Denver: the Architects and the Architecture, 1858–1893. Denver: Historic Denver, Inc., 1973.
- Hall, John. Hall's History of Colorado, vol. IV. Chicago: Blakely Printing Co., 1889.
- Historic Denver News, v. 10 No. 10. October 1980.
- Illustrated Denver – The Queen City of the Plains. Denver: Phoenix Publishing Co, 1893.
- "John J. Huddart, Denver Architect, Dies at Age 72." Denver Post, 23 April 1930, p. 15.
- Noel, Thomas J. Buildings of Colorado. New York: Oxford University Press, 1997.
- Noel, Thomas J. and Barbara S. Norgren. Denver: The City Beautiful and its Architects, 1893–1941. Denver: Historic Denver, Inc., 1987.
- Noel, Thomas J. and William J. Hansen. The Montclair Neighborhood. Denver: Historic Denver Inc., 1999.

Site Files Database, Office of Archaeology and Historic Preservation, Colorado Historical Society, Denver. State Historic Preservation Offices, phone interviews conducted by Dale Heckendorn, Colorado Historical Society: Nebraska, 12 January 1998 Oklahoma, 12 January 1998 Utah, 12 January 1998 Wyoming, 13 January 1998 Student, Annette L. Historic Cheesman Park Neighborhood. Denver: Historic Denver Inc., 1999. Wilk, Diane. The Wyman Historic District. Denver: Historic Denver Inc., 1995.
