= Cañon City State Armory =

- Canon City State Armory
- U.S. National Register of Historic Places
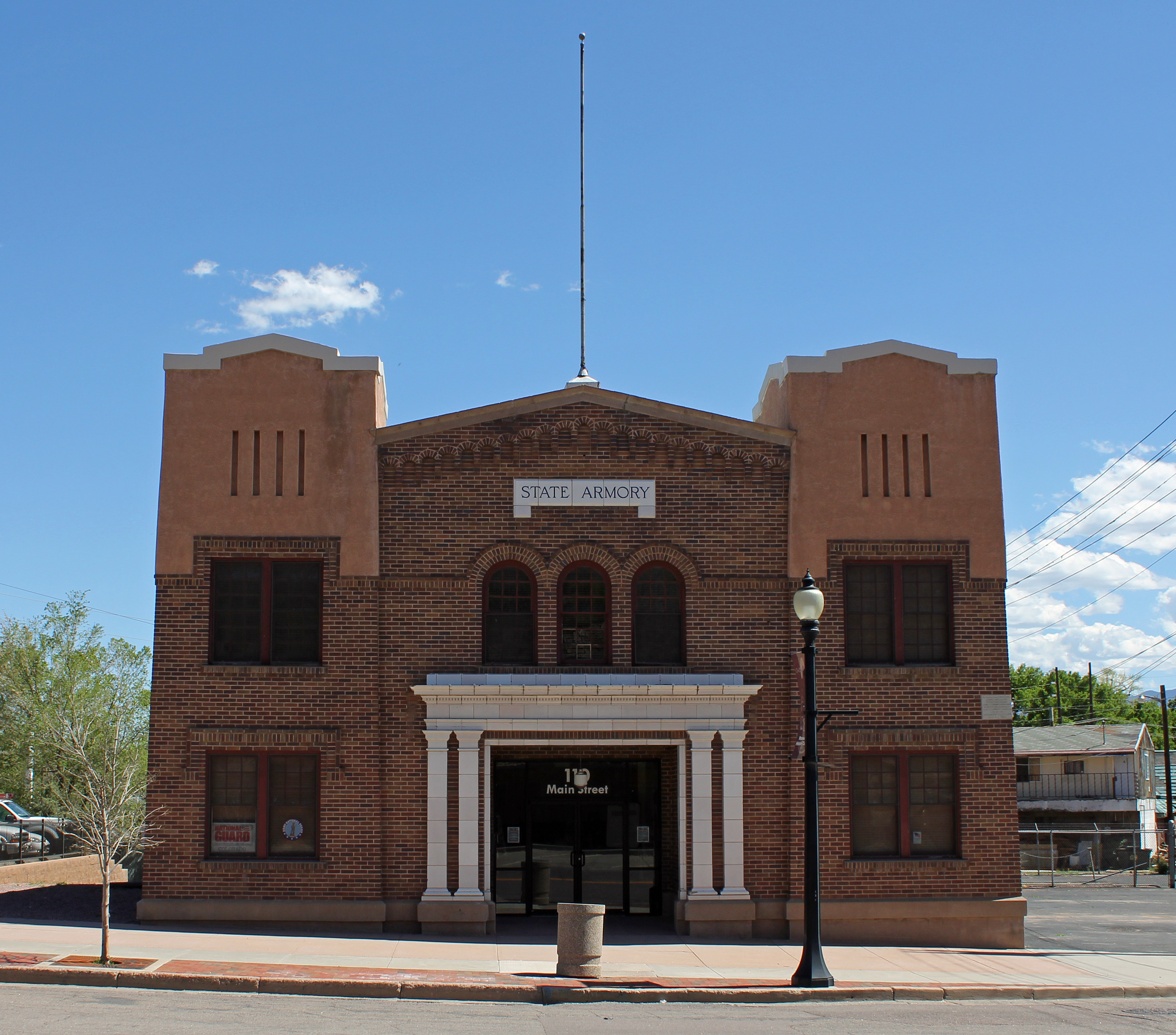

- Location within Colorado Location within the United States
- Location: 110 Main St., Canon City, Colorado
- Coordinates: 38°26′17″N 105°14′42″W
- Area: less than one acre
- Built: 1922
- Architect: John James Huddart
- Architectural style: Late 19th And 20th Century Revivals, Mediterranean revival
- NRHP reference No.: 99001011
- Added to NRHP: August 20, 1999

Canon City State Armory is a historic armory building in Cañon City, Colorado. Its design has been credited to Denver architect John J. Huddart. It is listed on the National Register of Historic Places listings in Fremont County, Colorado.

== See also ==
- Fort Collins Armory
