= Creswell Mansion =

Mansion in Denver on the National Register of Historic Places

- U.S. National Register of Historic Places
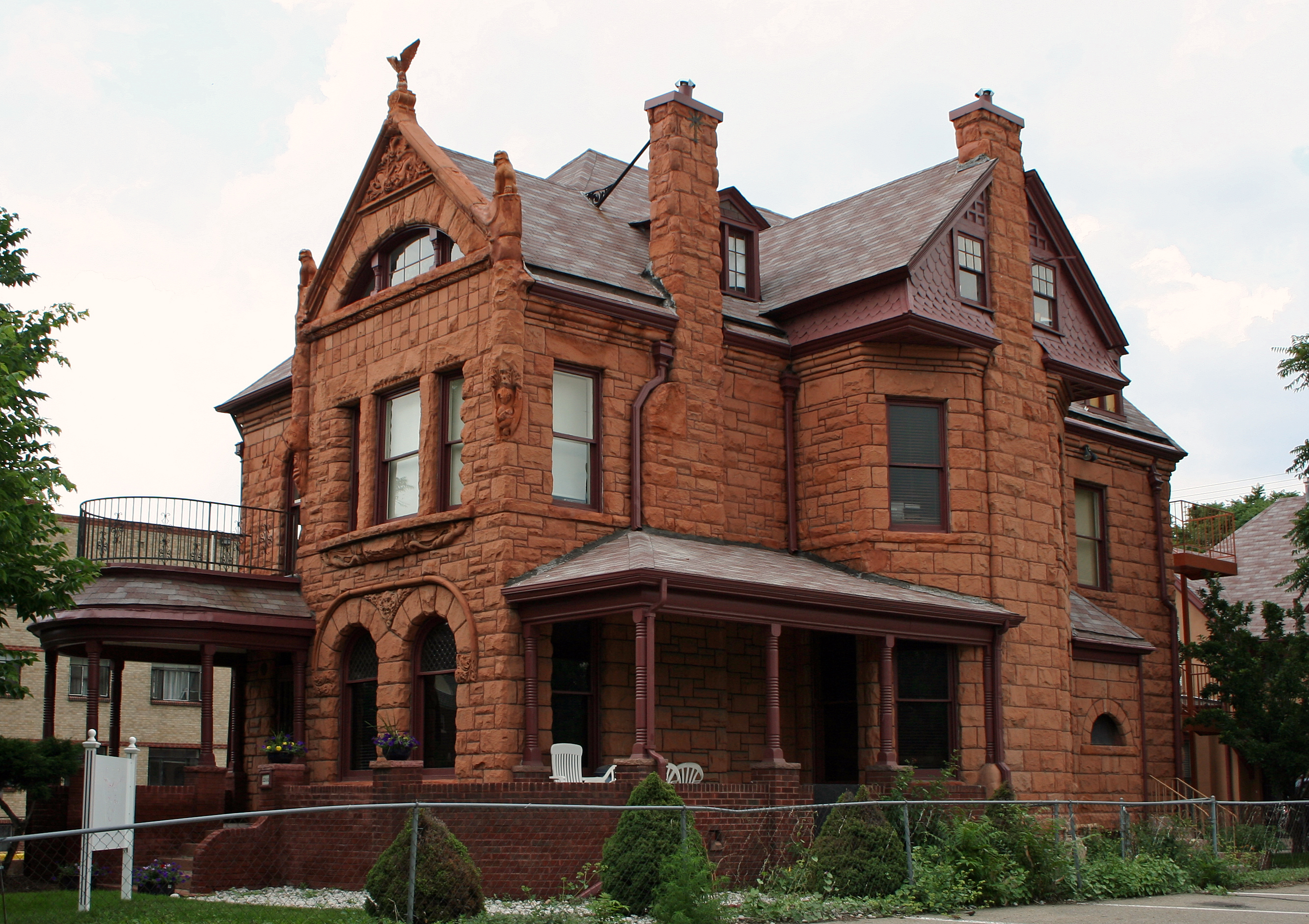
- The mansion in 2009

- Location within Colorado Location within the United States
- Location: 1244 Grant Street, Denver, Colorado
- Coordinates: 39°44′10″N 104°59′1″W
- Built: 1889
- Architect: John J. Huddart
- Architectural style: Queen Anne, Richardsonian Romanesque
- NRHP reference No.: 77000366
- Added to NRHP: November 25, 1977

The Creswell Mansion, recently renamed the Marijuana Mansion, is a historic mansion located at 1244 Grant Street in Denver, Colorado. It was designed in 1889 by leading Denver architect John J. Huddart. In 1977, it was added to the National Register of Historic Places.

== Architecture ==
The two-and-a-half-story mansion covers 4,200 square feet (390 square meters), and immediately behind the mansion exists an accompanying 1,500-square-foot (140-square-meter) carriage house. The exterior, constructed of red sandstone, combines elements of the Richardsonian Romanesque and Queen Anne styles. At the time it was built, the mansion enjoyed a view of the Front Range of the Rocky Mountains. Today, however, the view is obstructed by modern buildings.

== History ==
The mansion was designed by revered Denver architect John J. Huddart in 1889 for businessman Joseph Creswell and his family. It was added to the National Register on November 25, 1977. Huddart designed a number of other buildings listed on the National Register.

The building received the nickname “Marijuana Mansion” due to its connection with Colorado Amendment 64, which legalized the recreational use of marijuana. Vicente Sederberg LLP, a national cannabis law firm, moved their offices into the mansion shortly after voters approved the Amendment 64 proposal, which they had participated in writing. When Amendment 64 was passed in 2012, the Task Force on the Implementation of Amendment 64 was established, and Vicente Sederberg LLP was included in this task force. The mansion was also occupied at the same time by the National Cannabis Industry Association, who established it as the Colorado headquarters for the Marijuana Project.

Dr. John H. Hotchkiss acquired the historic Mansion through Hotchkiss Properties LLC In June 2024. Dr. Hotchkiss has stated that while he plans to "uphold the historical integrity" of the building, it is no longer associated with the cannabis industry.
