= Carnegie Library, Monte Vista Branch =

- Carnegie Public Library, Monte Vista Branch
- U.S. National Register of Historic Places
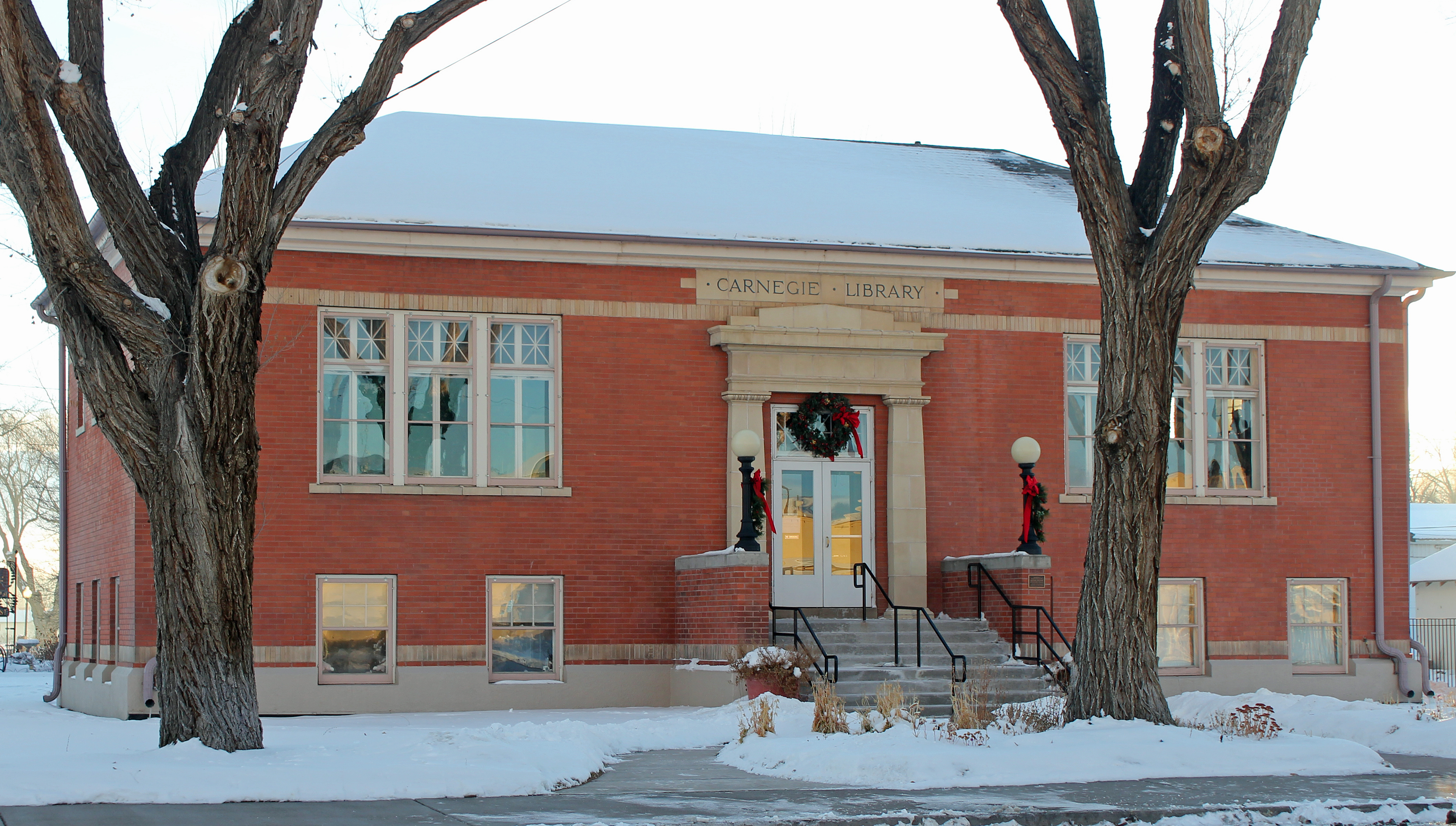
- The library in late 2012.

- Location within Colorado Location within the United States
- Location: 120 Jefferson St., Monte Vista, Colorado
- Coordinates: 37°34′48″N 106°8′40″W
- Area: less than one acre
- Built: 1919
- Architect: Huddart, John J.
- Architectural style: Classical Revival
- NRHP reference No.: 95000439
- Added to NRHP: April 14, 1995

The Carnegie Public Library, Monte Vista Branch, located at 120 Jefferson St. in Monte Vista, Colorado, is a small library opened in 1919. The building was designed by leading Denver architect John J. Huddart in the Classical Revival style. In 1995, it was added to the National Register of Historic Places. The Monte Vista Branch is one of two remaining original branches of the Carnegie Public Library.
