= Adams County Courthouse (Colorado) =

- U.S. National Register of Historic Places
- Colorado State Register of Historic Properties
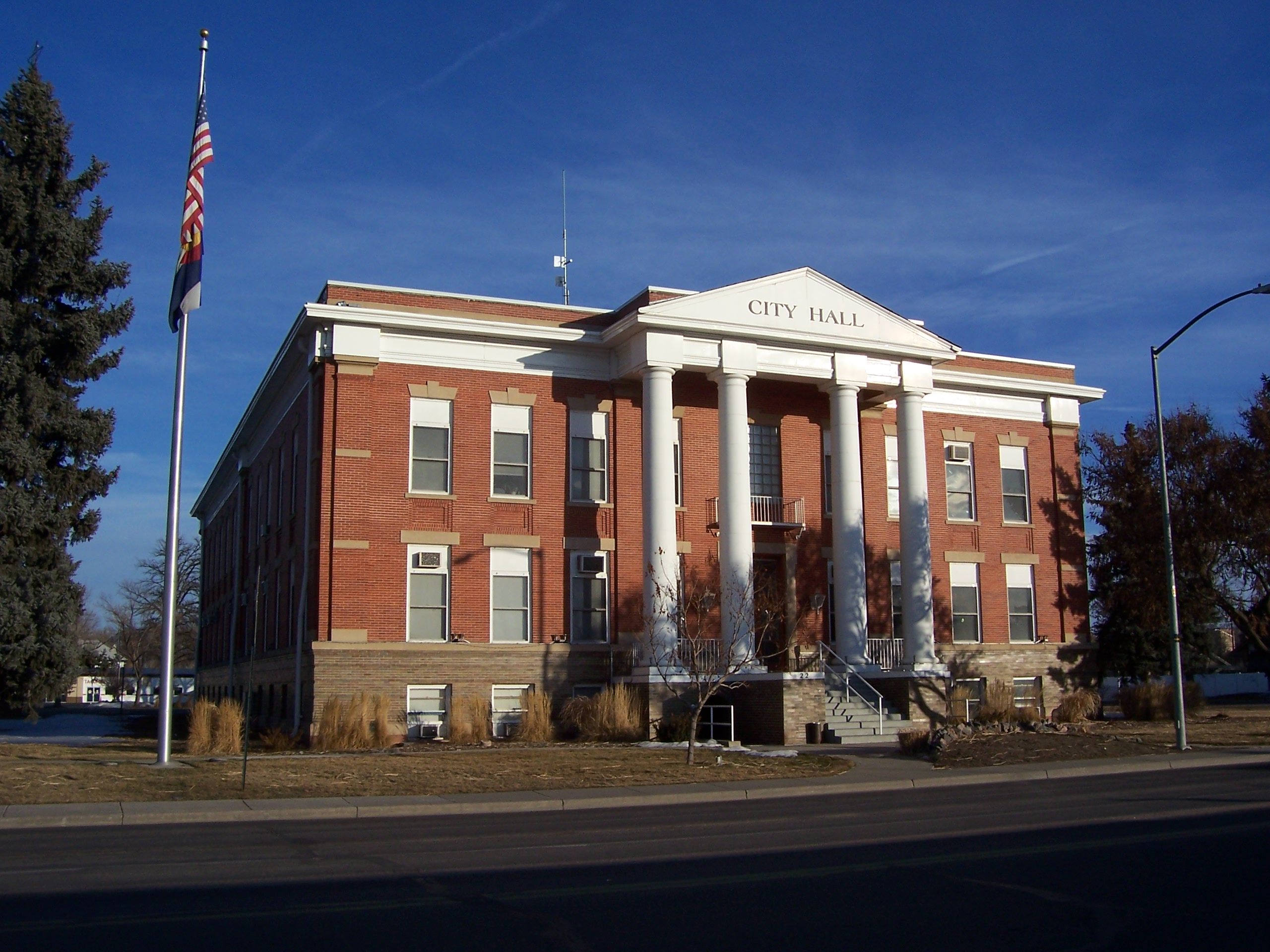

- Location within Colorado Location within the United States
- Location: 22 S 4th Ave., Brighton, Colorado
- Coordinates: 39°59′11″N 104°49′02″W
- Area: 1.9 acres (0.77 ha)
- Built: 1906
- Built by: A.B. McDonald et al.
- Architect: John James Huddart
- Architectural style: Classical Revival
- NRHP reference No.: 06000916
- CSRHP No.: 5AM.92
- Added to NRHP: October 4, 2006

The Adams County Courthouse in Brighton, Colorado, located at 22 S 4th Ave., was built in 1906, and housed the judicial functions of Adams County until the 1970s when the legislation moved out and the building became the Brighton City Hall. It was listed on the National Register of Historic Places in 2006.

As of 2020, it was serving as the Brighton City Hall.

Its original portion is a two-and-a-half-story brick building built in 1906. It has a red-tiled roof and a cupola rising to 91 feet (28 m), which was later removed. The building was nearly doubled in area in 1939 in a Public Works Administration-funded expansion which used matching materials. The expansion created a monumental pedimented Classical Revival entrance with Tuscan columns on the west side of the building. The building is about 139 by 87 feet (42 m × 27 m) in plan.

The original building was designed by John James Huddart and built by contractor A.B. McDonald. Denver architects Lester L. Jones and Richard O. Parry designed the expansion.
