= Cheyenne County Courthouse (Colorado) =

- U.S. National Register of Historic Places
- Colorado State Register of Historic Properties
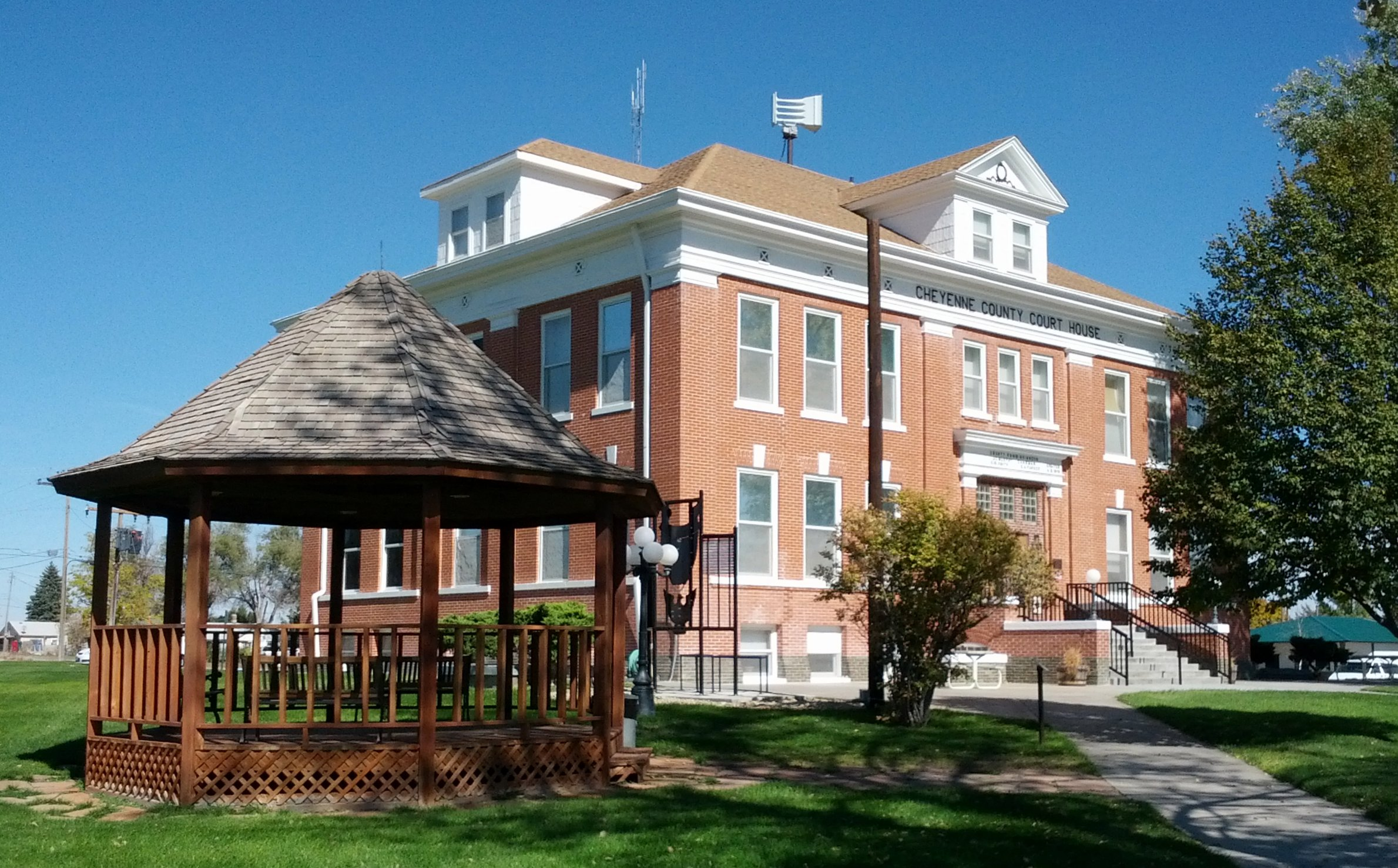
- Cheyenne County Courthouse

- Location within Colorado Location within the United States
- Location: 51 S. 1st St., Cheyenne Wells, Colorado
- Coordinates: 38°49′15″N 102°20′55″W
- Built: 1908
- Built by: Work, S.L.
- Architect: John James Huddart
- Architectural style: Georgian Revival
- NRHP reference No.: 89000997
- CSRHP No.: 5CH.52
- Added to NRHP: July 27, 1989

The Cheyenne County Courthouse in Cheyenne Wells, Colorado is a Georgian Revival-style building that was built in 1908 and first used in 1909. It was listed on the National Register of Historic Places in 1989.

It was deemed significant for its association with the rapid homesteading of Cheyenne County which was created just 20 years before the courthouse was built, and for its architecture. It was designed by noted Colorado architect John J. Huddart.

It was renovated and extended to the back in 1983.

== See also ==
- Cheyenne County Jail, also NRHP-listed and located in Cheyenne Wells
