= Murchison School =

- U.S. Historic district – Contributing property
- Location within South Carolina Location within the United States
- Location: Bennettsville, South Carolina, United States
- Coordinates: 34°36′55″N 79°40′55″W
- Built: 1902
- Architect: John J. Huddart
- Part of: Bennettsville Historic District (ID78002525, 93000438)

Murchison School is a historic 1902 school building in Bennettsville, South Carolina. It was designed by Denver architect John J. Huddart and named for a merchant who was also the town's first mayor, John D. Murchison (1826–1892). The school was given to the city in Murchison's memory by his widow, former teacher Harriet Murchison Beckwith (1855–1927).

The building's style is Italianate and includes a central bell tower with a terra cotta tablet over an ornate arched entrance. A marker was added to the building in 2008 by the Marlborough Historical Society (Marker Number 35-35). The school building is one of several historic structures in the area with Shiness (just steps away); the J.F. Kinney House / P.M. Kinney House; Bennettsville Presbyterian Church and Old Female Academy all within several hundred feet. The building is also a contributing property to the Bennettsville Historic District.

The building served as an elementary school from 1902 until 1989 (when it closed). In 1918 Bennettsville High School was built next to it. The auditorium has been used for civic events, club meetings, and theater productions. During World War II the auditorium's balcony was renovated to house a dual library for this school and Bennettsville High, after the high school burned. It was later restored to its original appearance.
