= Garden County Courthouse =

- U.S. National Register of Historic Places
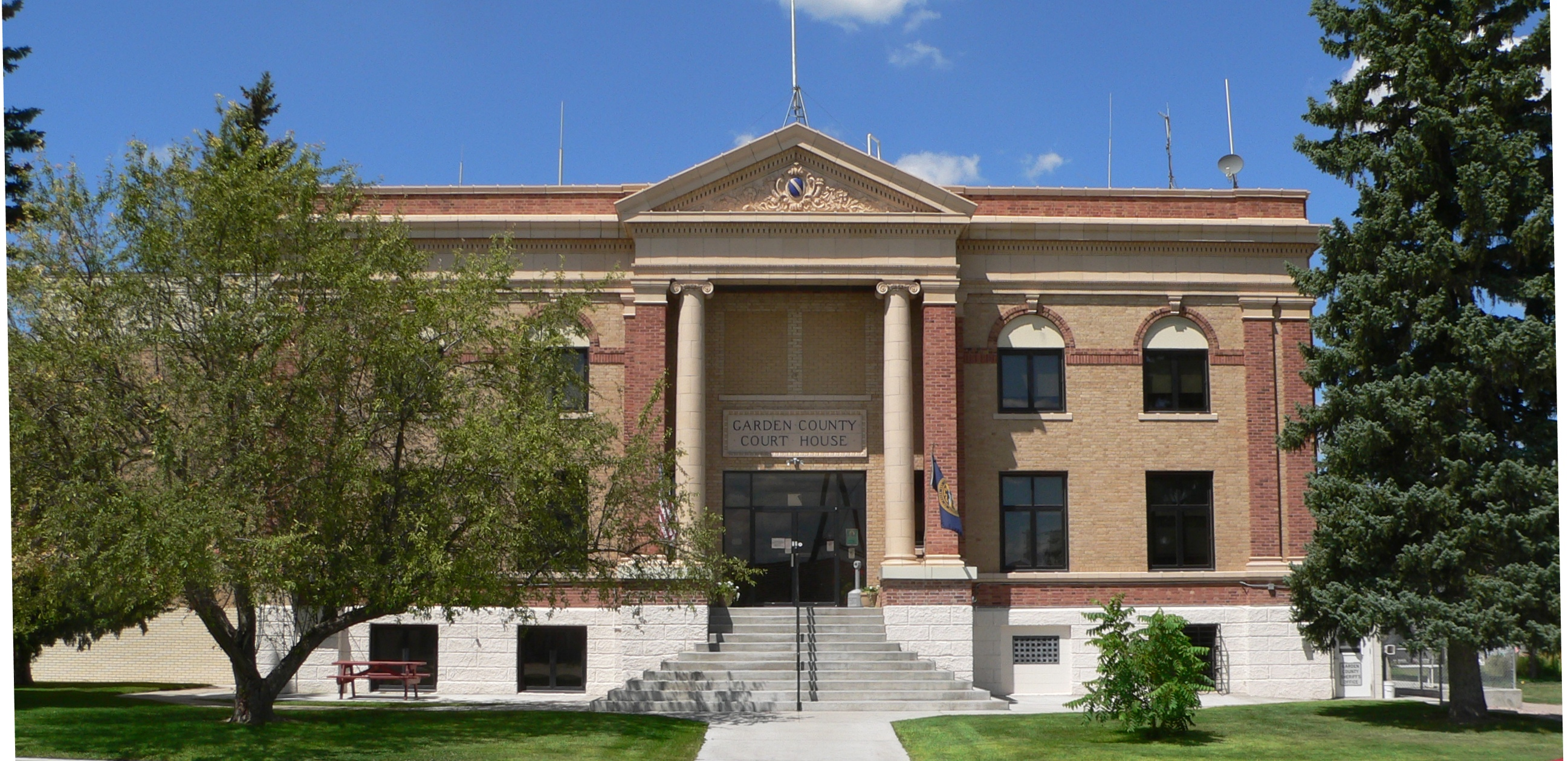

- Location within Nebraska Location within the United States
- Location: F and Main Sts., Oshkosh, Nebraska
- Coordinates: 41°24′30″N 102°20′37″W
- Area: less than one acre
- Built: 1921
- Built by: Mackie, J.
- Architect: Huddart, John J.
- Architectural style: Classical Revival
- MPS: County Courthouses of Nebraska MPS
- NRHP reference No.: 89002231
- Added to NRHP: January 10, 1990

The Garden County Courthouse, located at F and Main Sts. in Oshkosh, Nebraska, is a Classical Revival style courthouse designed by John J. Huddart that was built during 1921–22.

It was built to serve Garden County, which had broken off of Deuel, and was to be located in Oshkosh, Nebraska, the designated county seat. After Oshkosh was reached by railroad in 1908, a $40,000 bond issue was voted but failed in 1914. A later bond issue passed.

It was listed on the National Register of Historic Places in 1990.
