= Knearl School =

- U.S. National Register of Historic Places
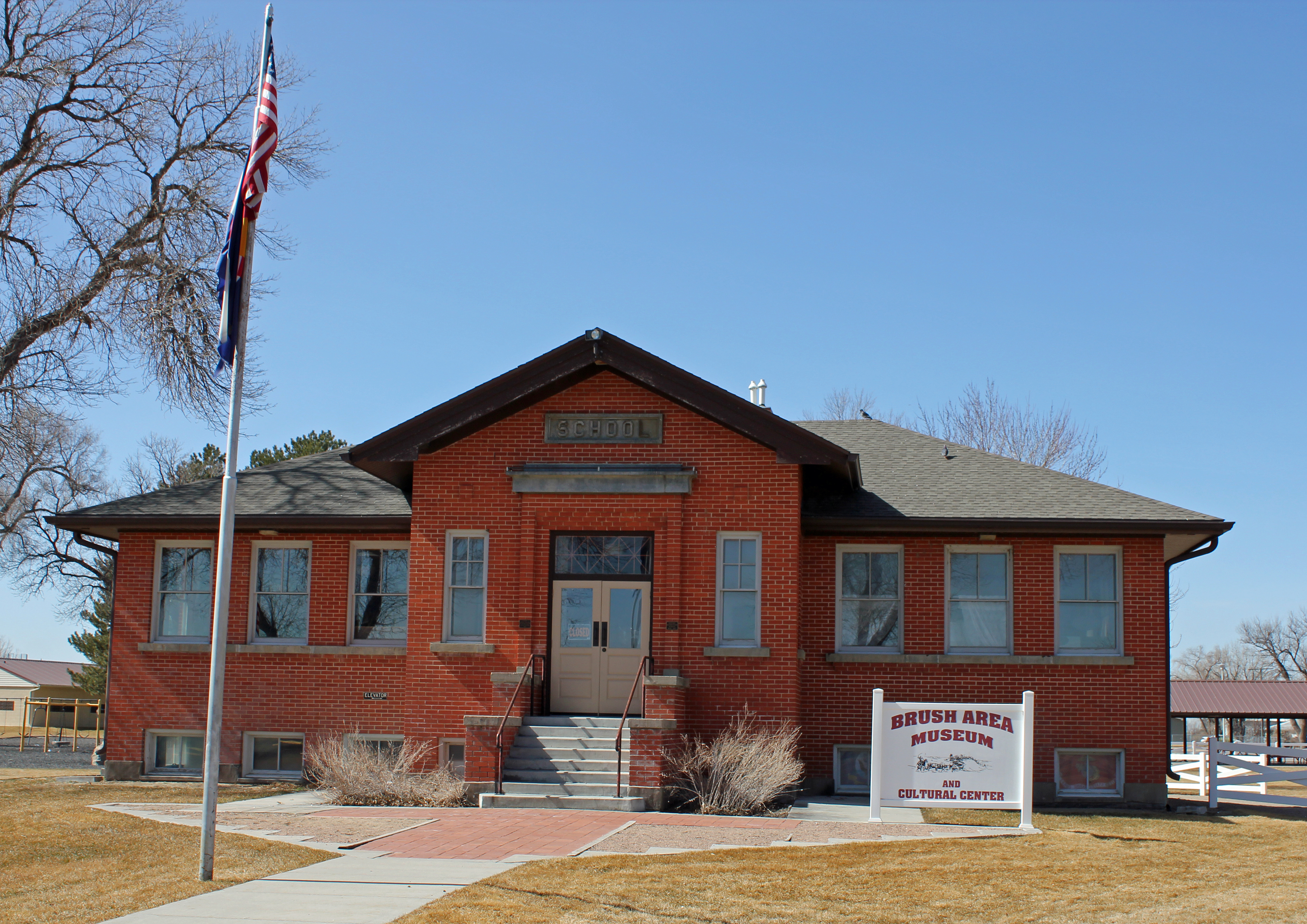
- School in 2012, with sign identifying it as "Brush Area Museum and Cultural Center"

- Location within Colorado
- Location: 314 S. Clayton St., Brush, Colorado
- Coordinates: 40°15′02″N 103°37′23″W
- Area: 1.9 acres (0.77 ha)
- Architectural style: Late 19th and Early 20th Century American Movements
- NRHP reference No.: 97000017
- Added to NRHP: January 31, 1997

The Knearl School, at 314 S. Clayton St. in Brush, Colorado, was listed on the National Register of Historic Places in 1997. It is a red brick one-story building, about 58 by 30 feet (17.7 m × 9.1 m) in plan, built in 1911. It was used as a school until 1971.

The school served about 100 students each year, usually in just grades 1 to 3, in years before 1964, when students had dropped to around 30 in total. It largely served the sugar beet farming workforce, which grew rapidly to staff a new facility in Brush opened by the Great Western Sugar Company.

It was named for William Knearl, a business leader and president of the school board, who donated the land for the school.

It is the first stop in a walking tour of Brush's historic sites, whose brochure notes that it became the Brush Area Museum and Cultural Center in 2005.

A 1999 study, the "Rural School Buildings in Colorado Multiple Property Submission" set standards for historic registration of schools like this.

== See also ==
- Lincoln School (Fort Morgan, Colorado), of similar appearance, also NRHP-listed in Morgan County
