= Deuel County Courthouse =

- U.S. National Register of Historic Places
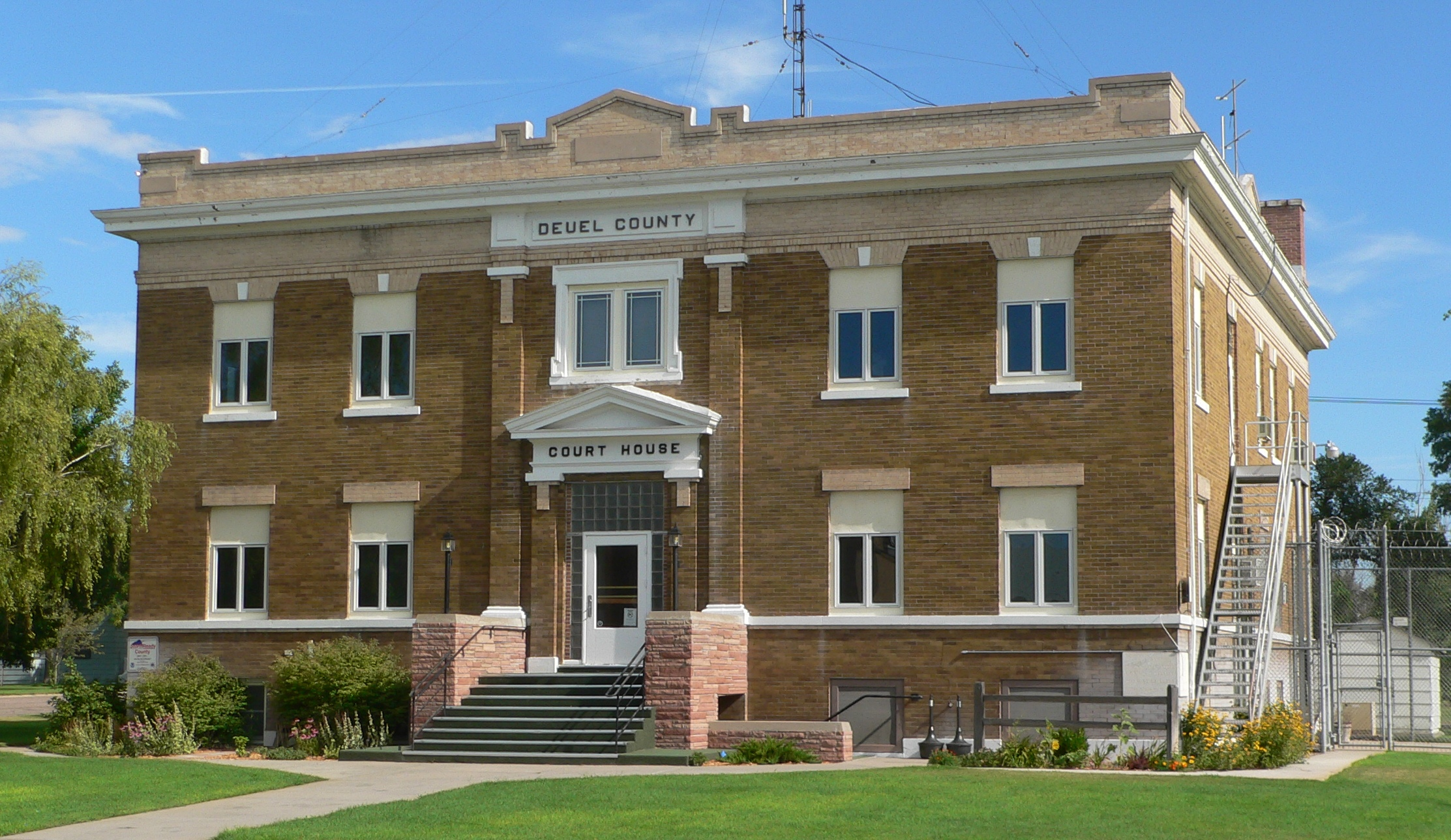

- Location within Nebraska Location within the United States
- Interactive map showing the location of Deuel County Courthouse
- Location: 718 3rd St., Chappell, Nebraska
- Coordinates: 41°5′38″N 102°28′17″W
- Area: less than one acre
- Built: 1915
- Architect: Huddart, John J.
- Architectural style: Classical Revival
- MPS: County Courthouses of Nebraska MPS
- NRHP reference No.: 89002239
- Added to NRHP: January 10, 1990

The Deuel County Courthouse, located at 718 3rd St. in Chappell, Nebraska, is a 1915 brick Classical Revival courthouse designed by noted Denver architect John J. Huddart. It was listed on the National Register of Historic Places in 1990.

It is a 60-by-70-foot (18 m × 21 m) rectangular building of the "County Citadel" type.
