= Logan County Courthouse (Colorado) =

- U.S. National Register of Historic Places
- U.S. Historic district – Contributing property
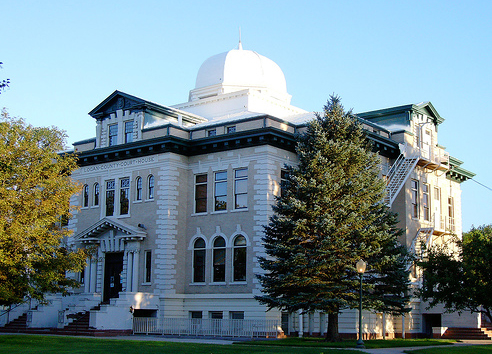

- Location within Colorado
- Location: Main St., Sterling, Colorado
- Coordinates: 40°37′25″N 103°12′32″W
- Area: 3.7 acres (1.5 ha)
- Built: 1910
- Architect: John J. Huddart
- Architectural style: Classical Revival
- Part of: Downtown Sterling Historic District
- NRHP reference No.: 79000615
- Added to NRHP: February 28, 1979

The Logan County Courthouse in Sterling, Colorado was built in 1910. It was listed on the National Register of Historic Places in 1979.

It was designed by architect John J. Huddart in Classical Revival style.

Its central rotunda area was restored in 1984.

The building houses a collection of paintings by local artist Eugene Carara and also framed original linen blueprints by architect Huddart.

It is also a contributing building in the Downtown Sterling Historic District.
