= Sterling Public Library =

- U.S. National Register of Historic Places
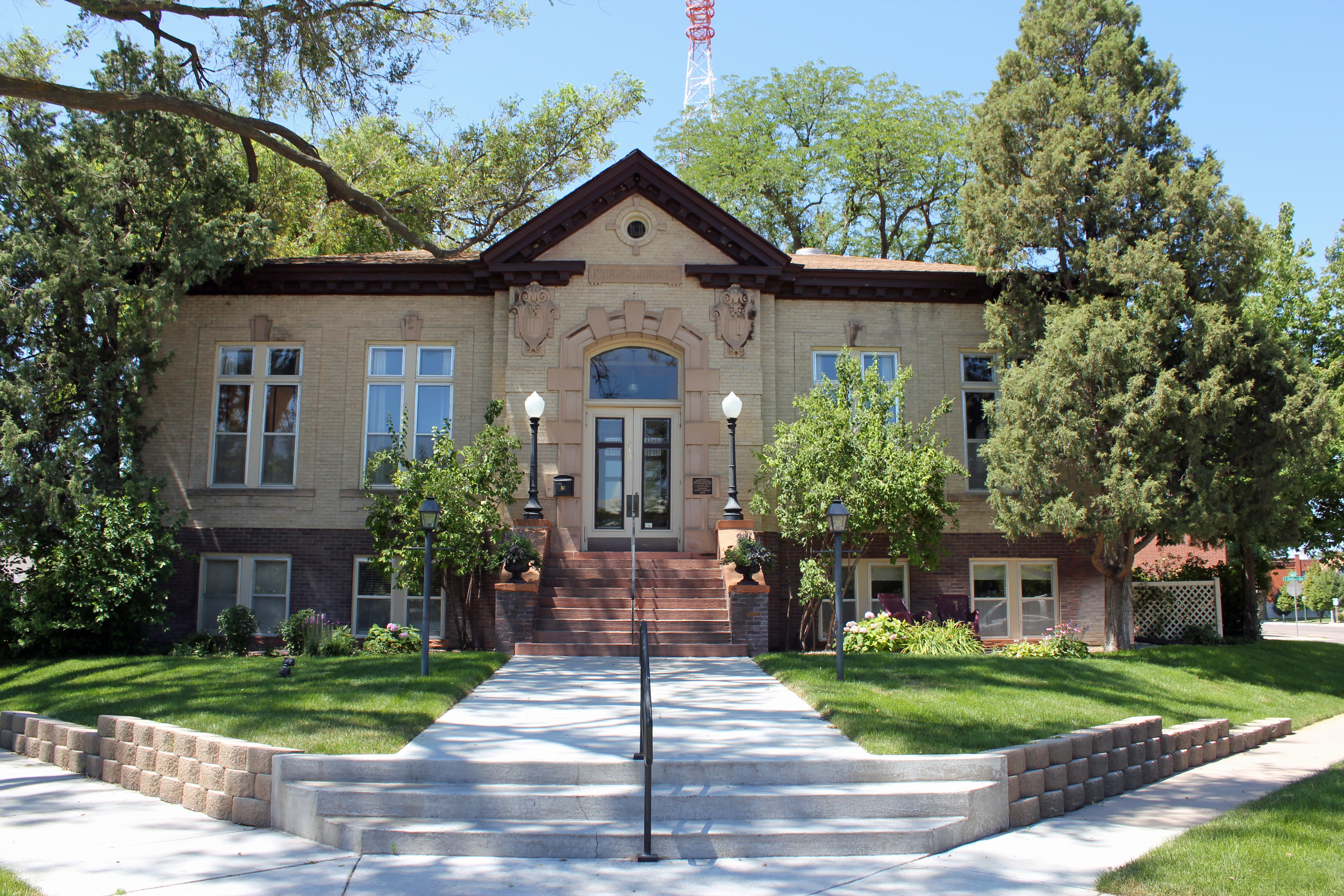

- Location within Colorado
- Location: 210 S. 4th St., Sterling, Colorado
- Coordinates: 40°37′23″N 103°12′38″W
- Area: less than one acre
- Built: 1916-18
- Architect: Cowe, William
- Architectural style: Late 19th and 20th Century Revivals
- NRHP reference No.: 01001121
- Added to NRHP: October 20, 2001

The Sterling Public Library, at 210 S. 4th St. in Sterling, Colorado, was built in 1918. It was listed on the National Register of Historic Places in 2001.

It was built as a Carnegie library, funded by a $12,500 Carnegie grant, and was built during 1916 to 1918. It is about 61 by 31 feet (18.6 m × 9.4 m) in plan. It served as Sterling's public library for 58 years, until 1976.

It was designed by Denver architect William Cowe, a Scottish immigrant who died in 1930.

During much of 2001 to 2010 it served as the Old Library Inn, a bed and breakfast; it has been a private residence since then.

A 100-year anniversary event at the library in June 2018 raised funds for the Sterling Community Fund.
