= Bovine Metropolis Theater =

Coordinates: 39°44′46″N 104°59′42″W

Bovine Metropolis Theater was the first dedicated improvisational performance and improvisational comedy theater in the Denver Metro Area. It is located at 1527 Champa Street, Denver, Colorado.

The Bovine Metropolis Theater houses the Bovine School of Improv, a five level program that teaches improvisational theatre and comedy. There are over 800 graduates of the Bovine School of Improv.

In 2001 Westword named Bovine Metropolis Theater the "Best Improv and Comedy Space" for that year.

The company is owned by Denise Maes and Eric Farone along with the Bovine's sister company, Apixii Applied Improvisation.

Apixii uses applied improvisation to conduct business training for companies on a contract basis.
