= Downtown Sterling Historic District =

Historic district in Colorado, United States

- U.S. National Register of Historic Places
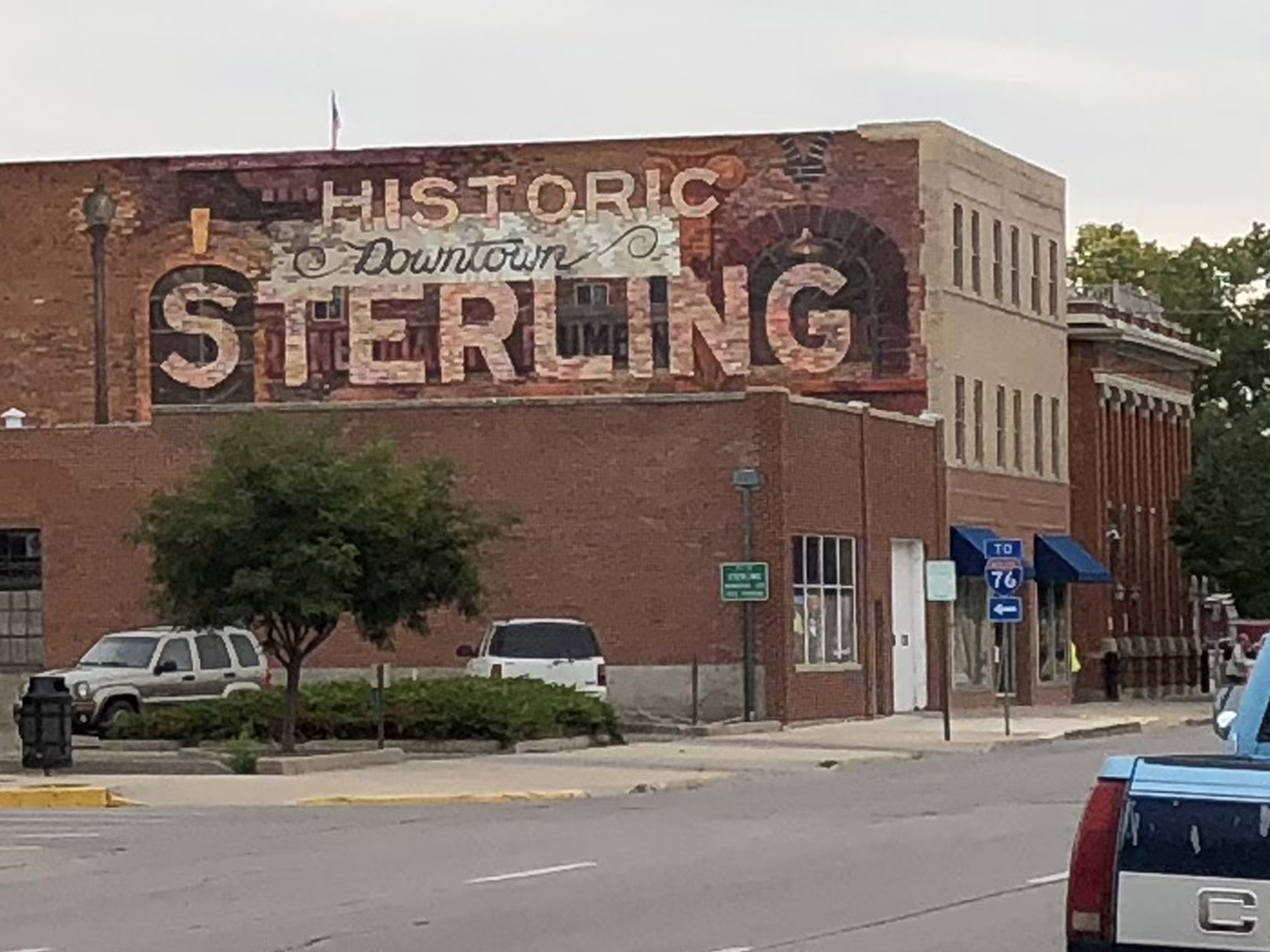

- Location within Colorado
- Location: Roughly bounded by Division Ave., Poplar, Front, Ash & 4th Sts., Sterling, Colorado
- Coordinates: 40°37′26″N 103°12′36″W
- Area: 38.9 acres (15.7 ha)
- Architect: Multiple
- Architectural style: Late 19th And Early 20th Century American Movements, Late 19th And 20th Century Revivals
- NRHP reference No.: 13000592
- Added to NRHP: August 13, 2013

The Downtown Sterling Historic District, in Sterling, Colorado, is a 38.9 acres (15.7 ha) historic district which was listed on the National Register of Historic Places in 2013.

It included 54 contributing buildings and was roughly bounded by Division Ave., Poplar, Front, Ash and 4th Sts.

It includes a city hall, a courthouse, and a theatre.

It includes the Logan County Courthouse, which is separately listed on the National Register.
