= Conrad Luft Sr. House =

Historic home in Colorado, US

- Conrad Luft Sr.
- U.S. National Register of Historic Places
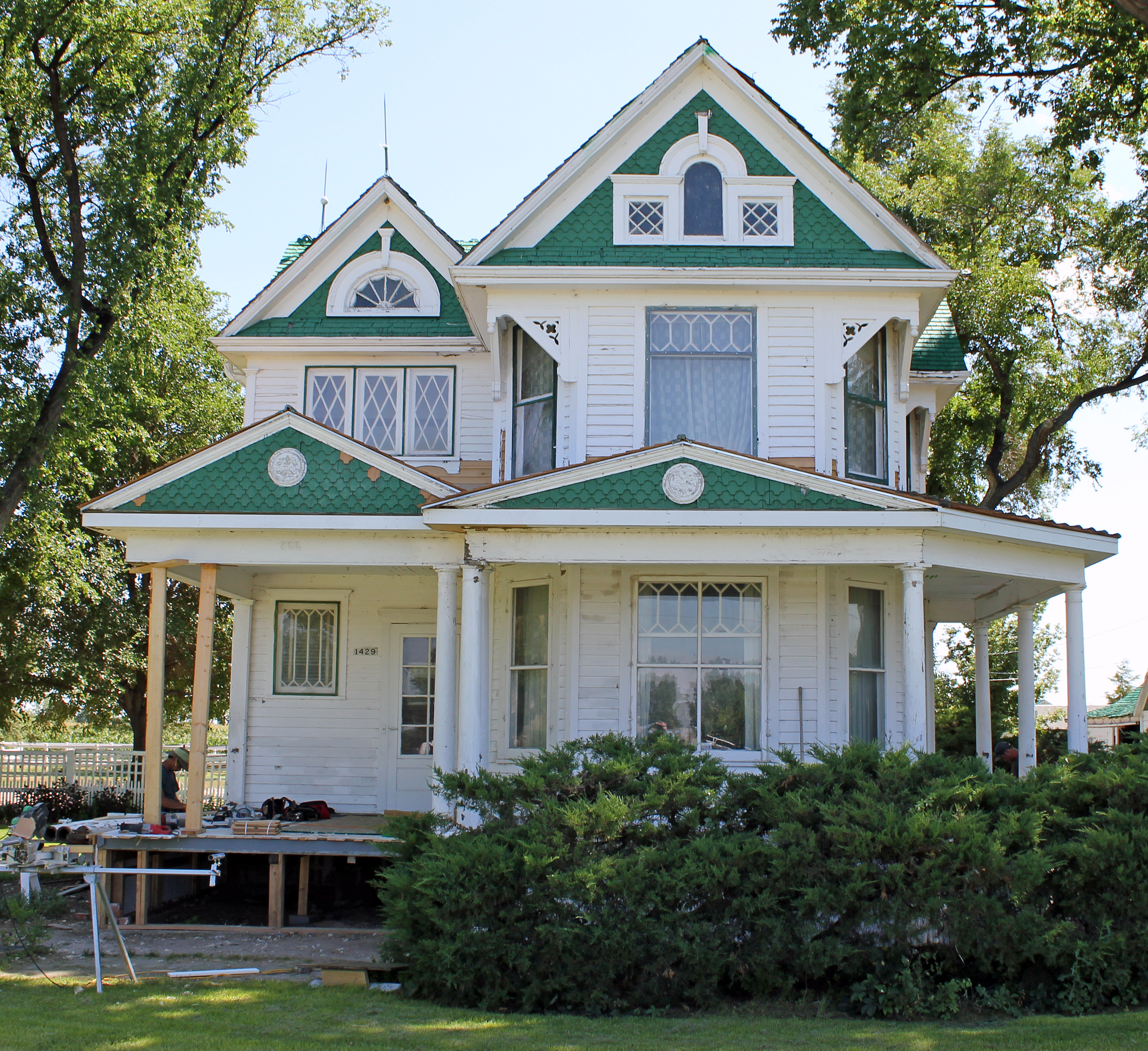

- Location within Colorado
- Nearest city: Sterling, Colorado
- Coordinates: 40°37′29″N 103°14′03″W
- Area: 0.6 acres (0.24 ha)
- Built: 1902
- Built by: Hoffman Brothers
- Architectural style: Queen Anne
- NRHP reference No.: 84000866
- Added to NRHP: May 17, 1984

The Conrad Luft Sr. House, near Sterling, Colorado, was built in 1902. It was listed on the National Register of Historic Places in 1984.

It is a Queen Anne-style house, apparently built to a pattern book design, with multiple gables, corner cutaways creating semi-octagonal rooms, and other details, some details being derivative of Colonial Revival style. It is 47 by 25 feet (14.3 m × 7.6 m) in plan.

Located now at 1429 State Highway 14, it was moved on rollers in 1925 about 1.5 miles (2.4 km) from its original location on Poplar Street. The front porch rebuilt then reflects further Colonial Revival styling.

It was unusual at its listing for having exterior and interior colors still repeating original colors.

It was built by the Hoffman Brothers (carpenters) to serve as their own residence.
