= Fort Morgan State Armory =

- U.S. National Register of Historic Places
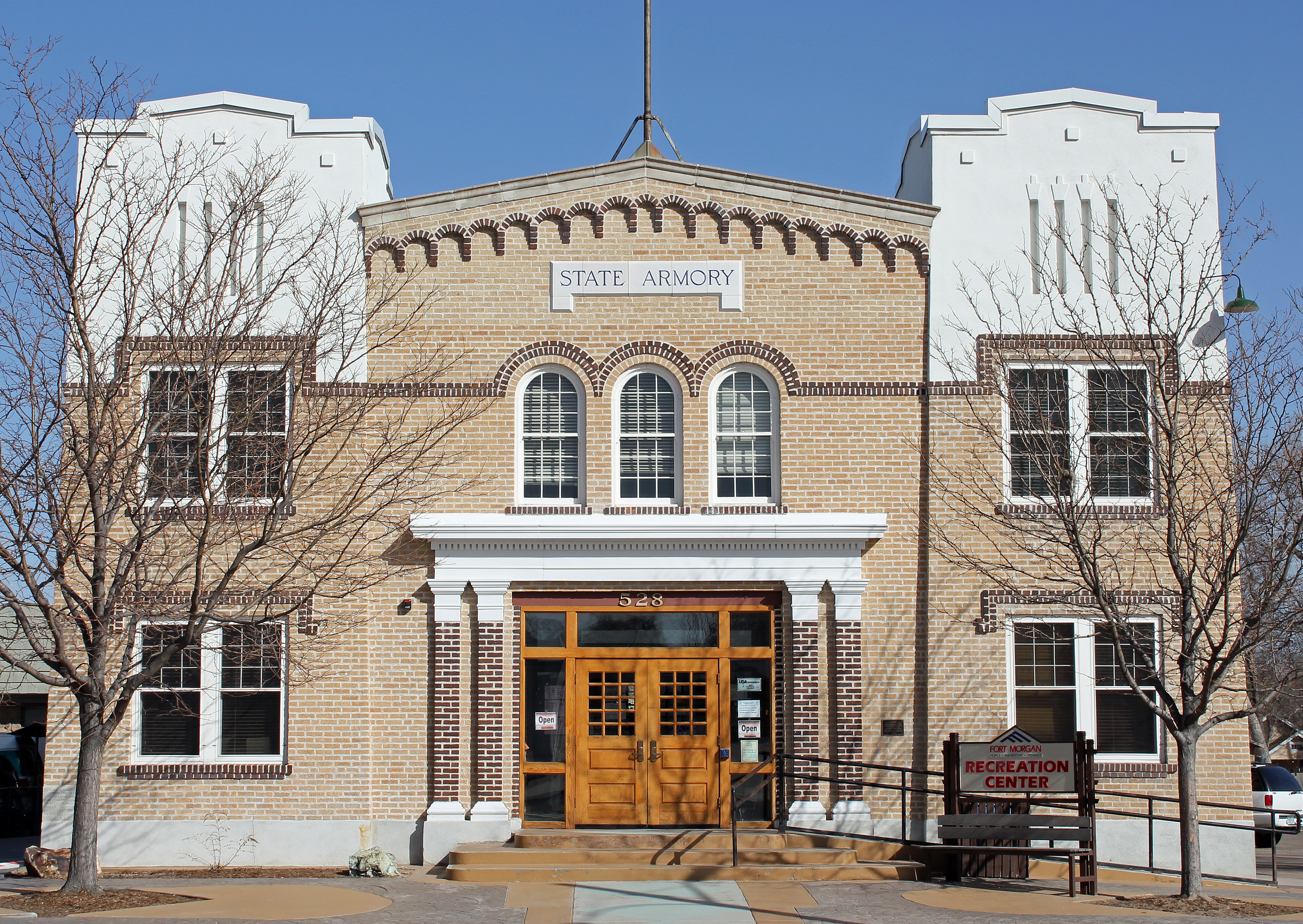

- Location within Colorado Location within the United States
- Location: 528 State St., Fort Morgan, Colorado
- Coordinates: 40°15′13″N 103°47′57″W
- Area: less than one acre
- Built: 1922
- Built by: Danielson & Son, Alex Young
- Architect: John J. Huddart, Mike Gay (c. 2000 renovation)
- Architectural style: Late 19th And 20th Century Revivals
- NRHP reference No.: 04000596
- Added to NRHP: June 16, 2004

Fort Morgan State Armory is a historic 1922 armory building in Fort Morgan, Colorado, Morgan County, Colorado. It was listed on the National Register of Historic Places in 2004. It was designed by John J. Huddart. It is located at 528 State Street and is being used as a recreation center.
