= Central Platoon School =

- U.S. National Register of Historic Places
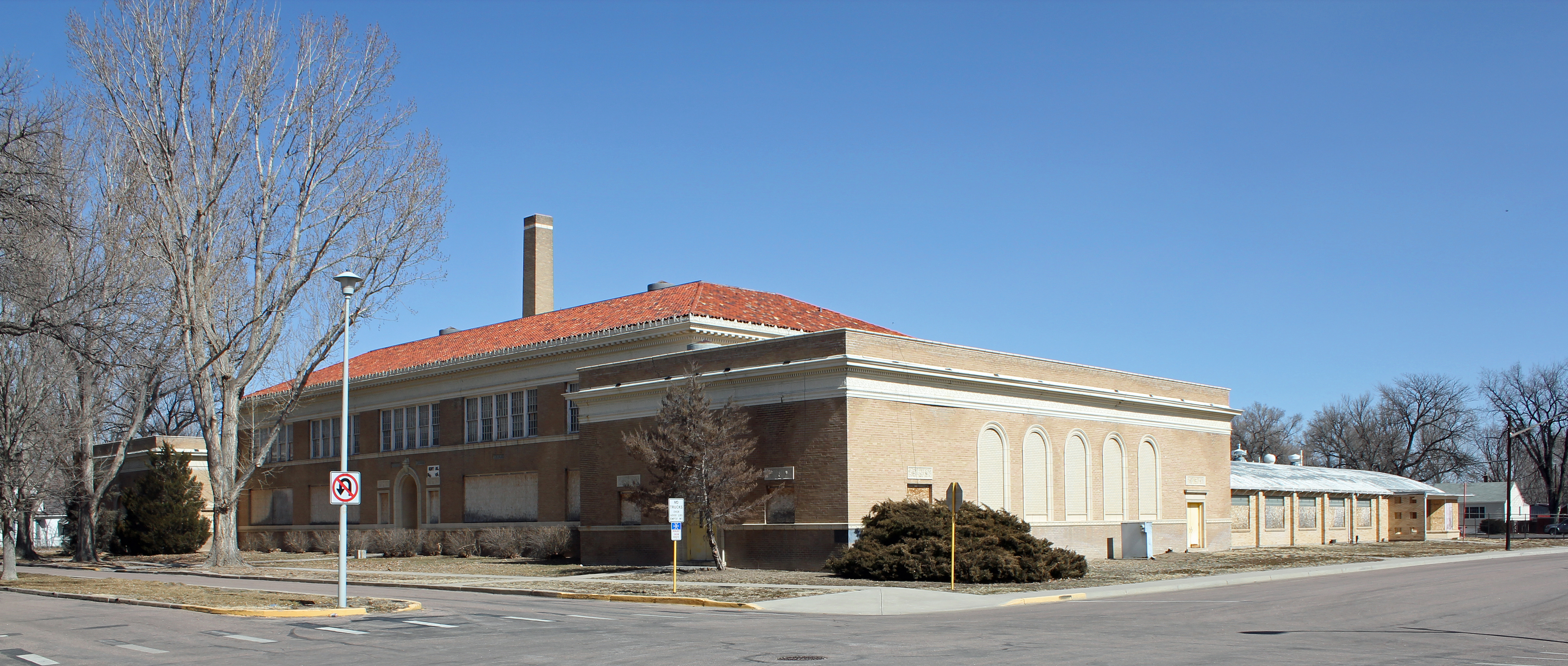

- Location within Colorado
- Location: 411 Clayton St., Brush, Colorado
- Coordinates: 40°15′29″N 103°37′20″W
- Area: 2.4 acres (0.97 ha)
- Built: 1928
- Architect: Mountjoy, Frederick E.; Frewen, Frank W., Jr.
- Architectural style: Renaissance Revival
- NRHP reference No.: 01001194
- Added to NRHP: November 5, 2001

Central Platoon School was a platoon school, where students were divided into groups (platoons) that switched between classroom studies and vocational as well as hands-on and recreational activities, in Brush, Colorado. It was designed by the Denver architectural firm Mountjoy & Frewen and has also been known as Central Elementary School. It was listed on the National Register of Historic Places in 2001.

The school is at 411 Clayton St. and occupies a complete block with an L-shaped plan. Mountjoy & Frewen was a partnership between Frederick E. Mountjoy and Frank W. Frewen, Jr.

A platoon school plan, also known as the Gary Plan, was devised by William Albert Wirt in 1907 in Gary, Indiana. The plan divided the students into two groups, where one platoon would use the academic classrooms, and the other platoon would be using shops, nature studies, the auditorium, the gymnasium, and other outdoor facilities. This allowed all of the school facilities to be in use through the entire school day, and it also promoted the intellectual, manual, and recreational development of the students.

== Renovation ==
Developer Ty Jackson purchased the property from the Brush Area Chamber of Commerce/Brush Chamber Foundation in 2021 and is converting it into low-income apartments. The property had been vacant since 1997. The project will be called Brush Central Village and will have up to 45 apartments. Several granting agencies have supported Jackson's work, including the Colorado Clean Energy Fund and the Colorado State Historical Fund.
