= Fort Morgan City Hall =

- U.S. National Register of Historic Places
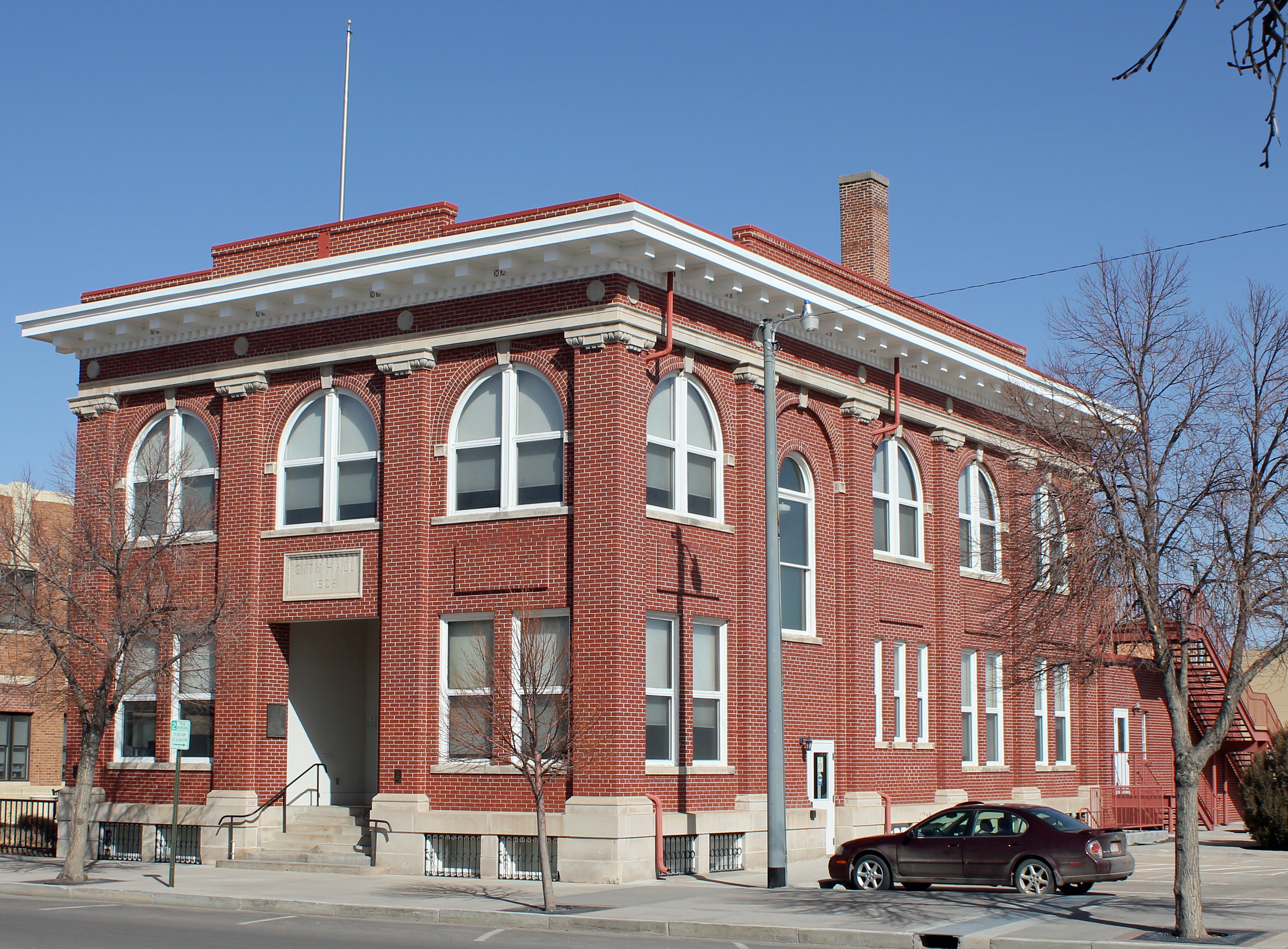
- City Hall in 2012

- Location within Colorado
- Location: 110 Main St., Fort Morgan, Colorado
- Coordinates: 40.24772°N 103.80122°W
- Area: less than one acre
- Built: 1908
- Built by: C.J. Smith
- Architect: Marean and Norton
- Architectural style: Classical Revival
- NRHP reference No.: 95001339
- Added to NRHP: November 22, 1995

The Fort Morgan City Hall, at 110 Main St. in Fort Morgan, Colorado, was built in 1908. It was listed on the National Register of Historic Places in 1995.

It was designed in Classical Revival style by Denver architects Marean and Norton and constructed by local builder C.J. Smith. It was very well built and has served the city well for more than a century.

It was used for community events and by community organizations, including:

- For a period of eight years, a library was hosted on the second floor, with a collection of 900 books from the Ladies Library Association. Fort Morgan's first librarian was hired by the city to open it afternoons and evenings. The library then moved to a new Carnegie Library, in City Park, which was completed in 1916.
- The Fort Morgan band would practice there on Wednesday evenings, then perform a summertime series of 20 concerts in the Assembly Room.

It was deemed significant for National Register listing for

association with events that made an important contribution to the development of Fort Morgan. With its monumental proportions and dignified details, this striking example of the Classical Revival style at the head of Main Street represents the beginning of Fort Morgan's municipal history. The City Hall building symbolizes the growth, prosperity and maturity of the Fort Morgan community. The building's construction coincides with the beginnings of political patronage as the city leaders established an infrastructure of public service and public works. The building became the focal point in the civic development of Fort Morgan and served as a center of municipal government and community life for 72 years. The prominent location at the southern entrance to the central business district and across from the Burlington Railroad depot, the primary railroad exchange, contributes to the historical importance of the site."

It was deemed significant also

for its association with George G. Cox, the one man most responsible for planning, establishing, and operating the growing range of city services and public amenities hi Fort Morgan during the first four decades of the twentieth century. Cox served as the city's first, most influential, and most productive superintendent. The design of the City Hall reflects his innovative yet pragmatic approach to municipal services. The building housed his own office as well as the city departments he so ably supervised.

Fort Morgan's City Council has its chambers upstairs.
