= Lincoln School (Fort Morgan, Colorado) =

- U.S. National Register of Historic Places
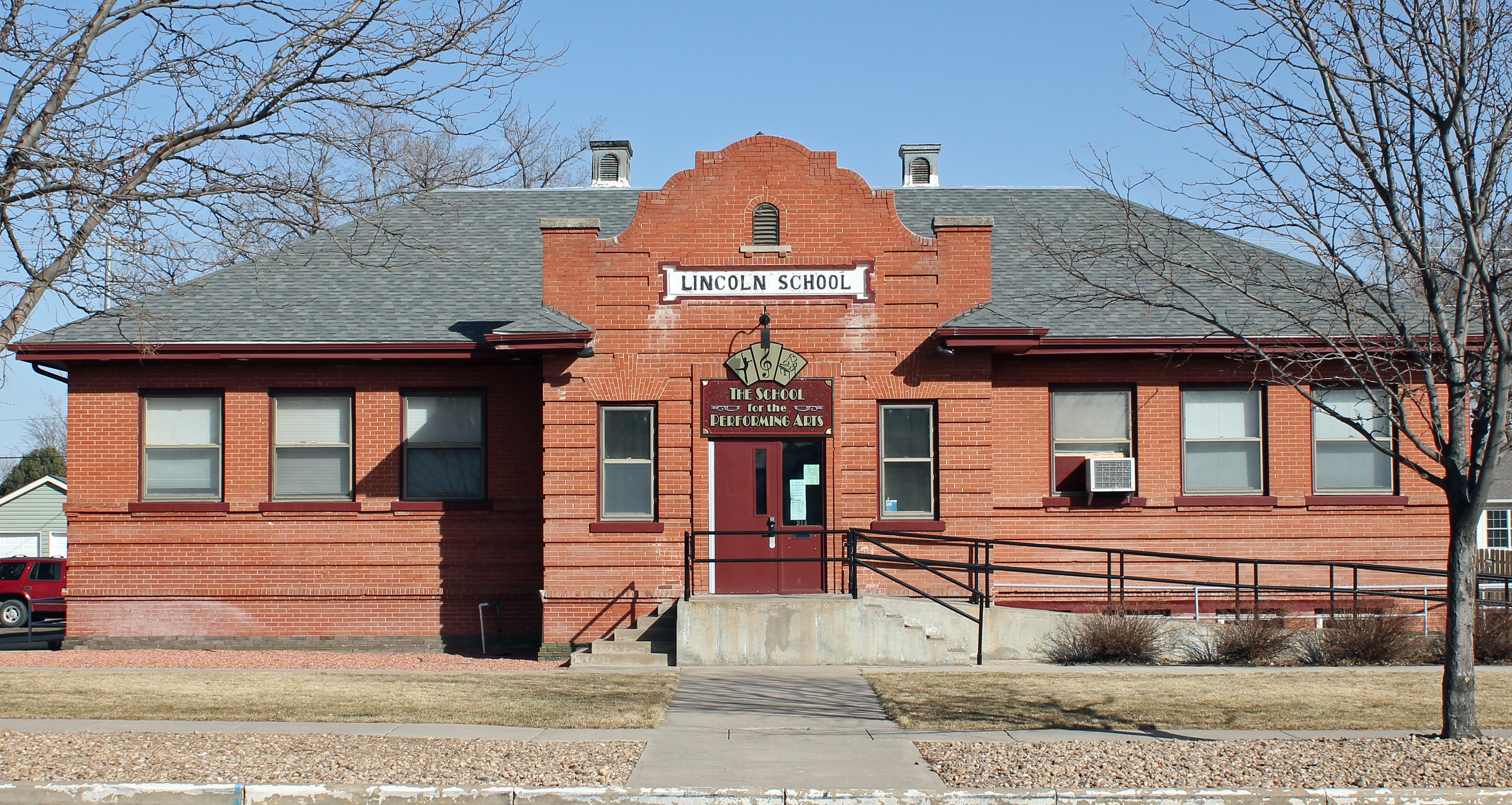

- Location within Colorado
- Location: 914 State St., Fort Morgan, Colorado
- Coordinates: 40°15′30″N 103°48′01″W
- Area: less than one acre
- Built: 1909, 1920
- Architect: John J. Huddart
- Architectural style: Mission/spanish Revival
- NRHP reference No.: 10000216
- Added to NRHP: April 27, 2010

The Lincoln School, at 914 State St. in Fort Morgan, Colorado, was built in 1909 and expanded in 1920. It was listed on the National Register of Historic Places in 2010.

The original or expansion was designed by British-born Denver-based architect John J. Huddart in Mission/Spanish Revival style.

It has also been known as the School for the Performing Arts.

According to the School for the Performing Arts' webpage, the school was originally opened in 1909 and became open as the School for the Performing Arts on the 100th anniversary of the building.

The National Register listing was in "recognition of this property’s contribution to the heritage of the State of Colorado."
