= Fort Collins Armory =

- U.S. National Register of Historic Places
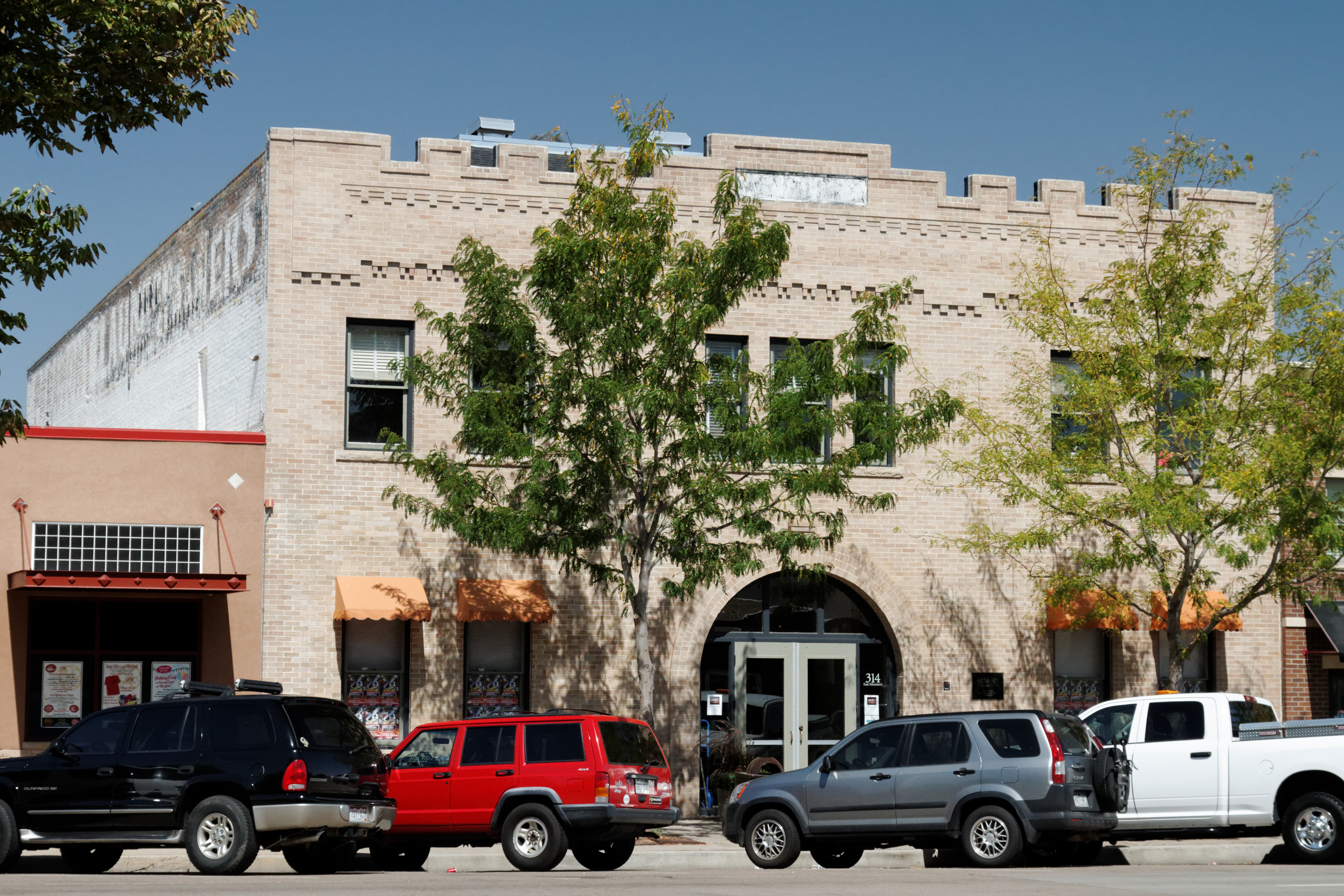

- Location within Colorado Location within the United States
- Location: 314 E. Mountain Ave., Fort Collins, Colorado
- Coordinates: 40°35′14″N 105°4′21″W
- Area: less than one acre
- Built: 1907
- Built by: M.G. Conley
- Architect: Arthur M. Garbutt
- Architectural style: Romanesque
- NRHP reference No.: 02001133
- Added to NRHP: October 15, 2002

Fort Collins Armory in Fort Collins, Colorado is a historic armory building designed by local architect Arthur M. Garbutt. It was built in 1907, and it was listed on the National Register of Historic Places in 2002.

== History ==
An armory in Fort Collins was constructed on land owned by S.H. Clammer and F.A. Carleton who paid for the construction and leased the armory to the state. It included a basement shooting gallery, a large drill hall, officers' quarters, enlisted men's quarters, and offices. used as a meeting, convention, and entertainment facility. After its construction in 1907, Fort Collins’ historic Armory building often functioned as a space for public gathering and entertainment. The building served as the community's first permanent National Guard Armory, housing about 60 National Guardsmen. Its drill hall doubled as a public hall for Northern Colorado's social and civic events. When a new armory was built on College Avenue in 1922, the building was vacated by the National Guard. Since then, the Armory building on Mountain Avenue has served the community in various ways, including as a roller skating rink, a laundry, a meeting hall, and office and retail space.
