= Old Trail School (Wiggins, Colorado) =

- U.S. National Register of Historic Places
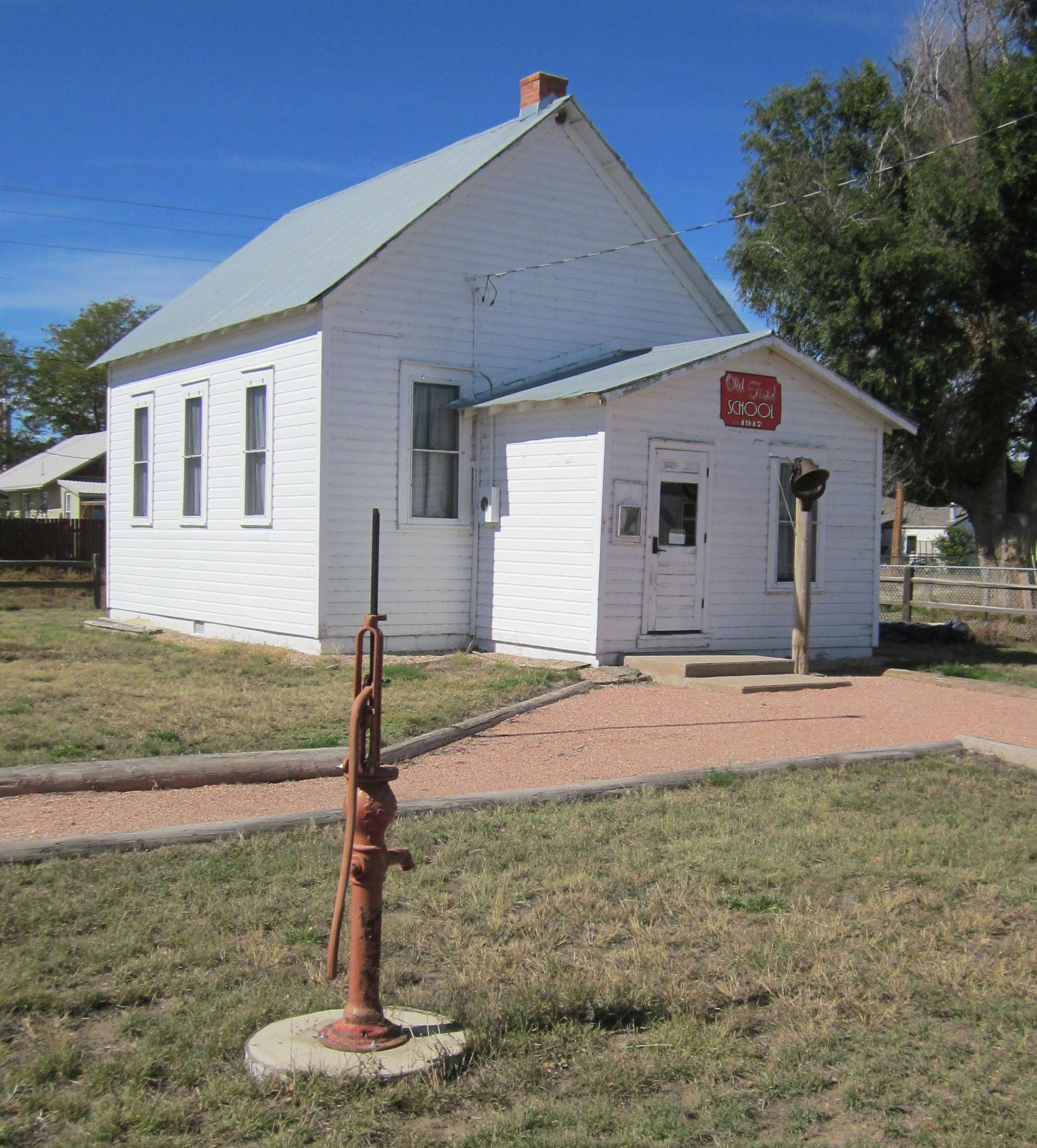
- School in 2014

- Location within Colorado
- Location: 421 High St., Wiggins, Colorado
- Coordinates: 40°13′34″N 104°04′18″W
- Area: less than one acre
- Built: c.1912
- Architectural style: Late 19th And Early 20th Century American Movements
- MPS: Rural School Buildings in Colorado MPS
- NRHP reference No.: 04000337
- Added to NRHP: April 20, 2004

The Old Trail School, at 421 High St. in Wiggins, Colorado, is a historic one-room schoolhouse which was built around 1912. It has also been known as the Reed School, presumably because it was located on the Reed family homestead. It was moved in 1917 to a site close to the Fort Morgan cut-off of the Overland Trail. It served as a school from c.1912 to 1946, when schools were consolidated. It was then moved to Wiggins to stand next to the continuing school there, and it was used as a music room. After the continuing school was expanded in 1963, it was no longer needed for that purpose. The Wiggins Historical Group took ownership in 1964 and moved it to its current location. It was listed on the National Register of Historic Places in 2004.

In 2003 it was still owned by the Wiggins Historical Group, whose President and members wrote the National Register nomination, finding that it met standards set in a 1999 study, the "Rural School Buildings in Colorado Multiple Property Submission".
