= Morgan Heights, Colorado =

Unincorporated community in Morgan County, CO, USA

- Census-designated place
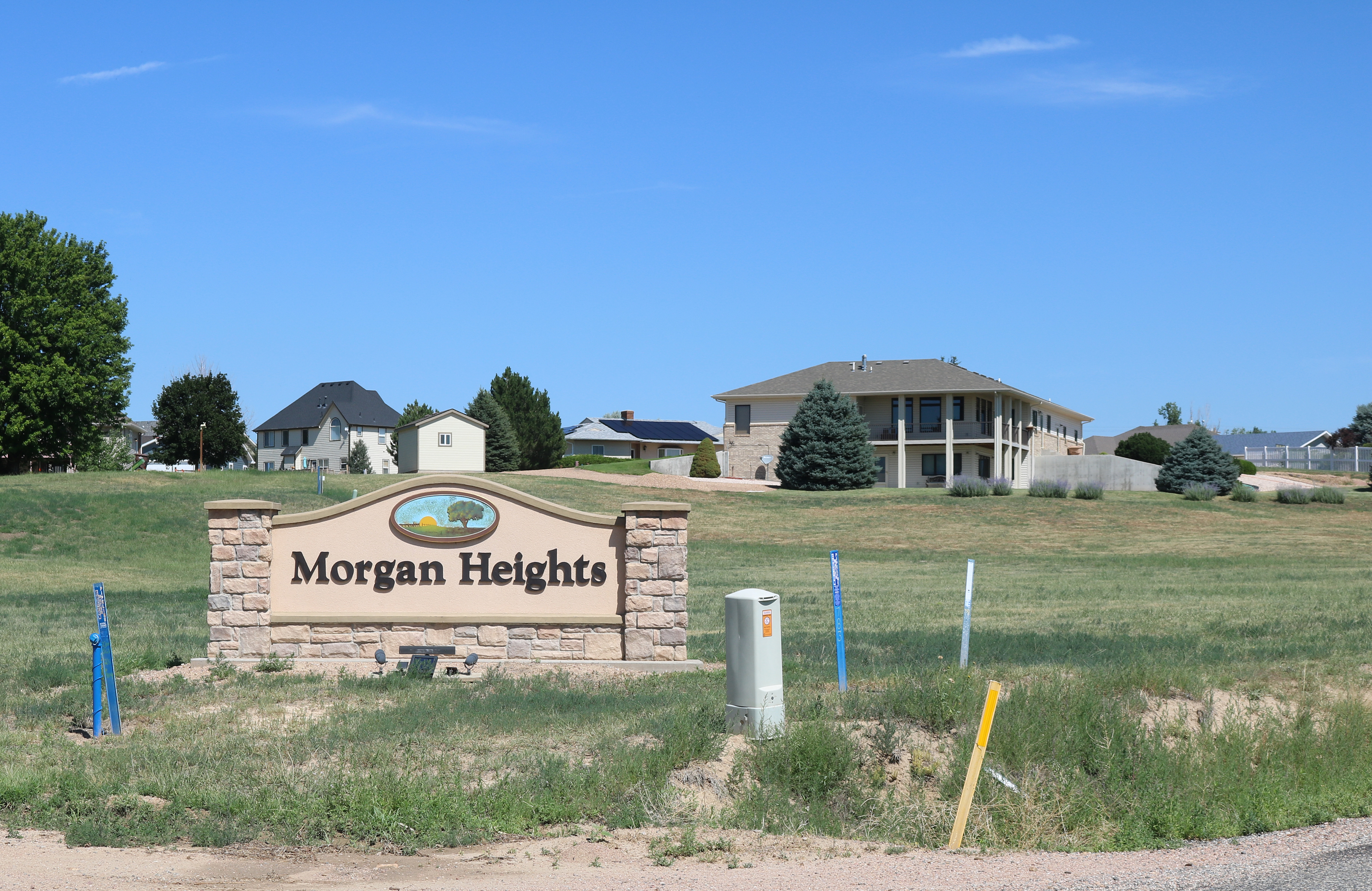
- Morgan Heights entrance sign

- Location of the Morgan Heights CDP in Morgan County, Colorado
- Coordinates: 40°17′15″N 103°49′39″W
- Country: United States
- State: Colorado
- County: Morgan County

Government
  - Type: unincorporated community

Area
  - Total: 0.285 sq mi (0.739 km^{2})
  - Land: 0.285 sq mi (0.739 km^{2})
  - Water: 0 sq mi (0.000 km^{2})
- Elevation: 4,433 ft (1,351 m)

Population (2020)
  - Total: 298
  - Density: 1,040/sq mi (403/km^{2})
- Time zone: UTC-7 (MST)
  - Summer (DST): UTC-6 (MDT)
- ZIP Code: Fort Morgan 80701
- Area code: 970
- GNIS feature ID: 2583268

Morgan Heights is an unincorporated community and a census-designated place (CDP) located in and governed by Morgan County, Colorado, United States. The CDP is a part of the Fort Morgan, CO Micropolitan Statistical Area. The population of the Morgan Heights CDP was 298 at the United States Census 2020. The Fort Morgan post office (Zip Code 80701) serves the area.

== Geography ==
The Morgan Heights CDP has an area of 183 acres (0.739 km^{2}), all land.

== Demographics ==
The United States Census Bureau initially defined the Morgan Heights CDP for the United States Census 2010.

Morgan Heights CDP, Colorado
| Year | Pop. | ±% |
|---|---|---|
| 2010 | 266 | — |
| 2020 | 298 | +12.0% |
Source: United States Census Bureau

== See also ==
- Fort Morgan Micropolitan Statistical Area
