= Trail Side, Colorado =

Census-designated place in Morgan County, CO, USA

- Census-designated place
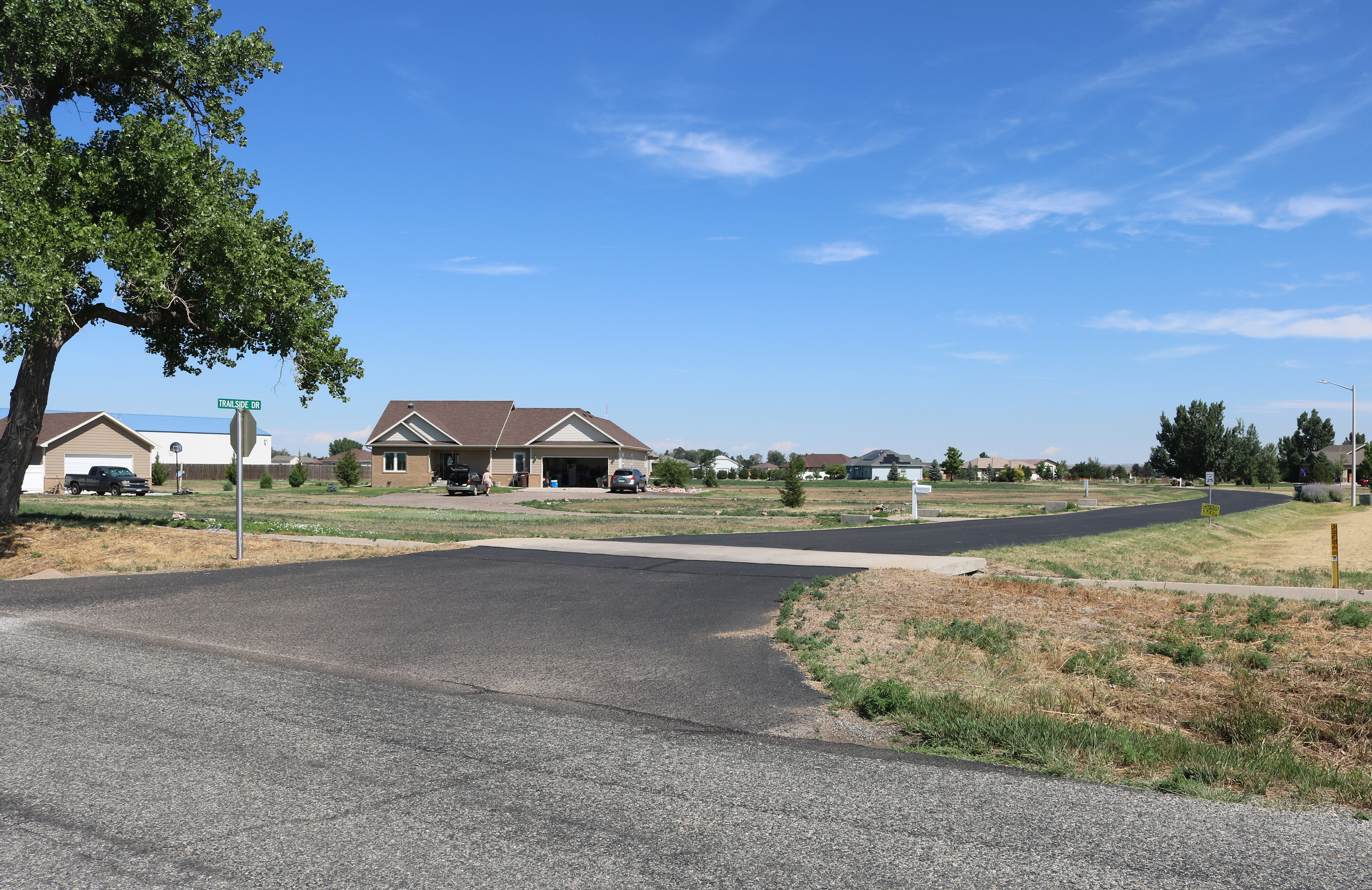
- One of the entrances to the Trail Side subdivision — at Trailside Drive and County Road R

- Location of the Trail Side CDP in Morgan County, Colorado
- Coordinates: 40°15′03″N 103°50′28″W
- Country: United States
- State: Colorado
- County: Morgan County

Government
  - Type: unincorporated community

Area
  - Total: 0.717 sq mi (1.856 km^{2})
  - Land: 0.717 sq mi (1.856 km^{2})
  - Water: 0 sq mi (0.000 km^{2})
- Elevation: 4,354 ft (1,327 m)

Population (2020)
  - Total: 157
  - Density: 219/sq mi (84.6/km^{2})
- Time zone: UTC-7 (MST)
  - Summer (DST): UTC-6 (MDT)
- ZIP Code: Fort Morgan 80701
- Area code: 970
- GNIS feature ID: 2583307

Trail Side is an unincorporated community and a census-designated place (CDP) located in and governed by Morgan County, Colorado, United States. The CDP is a part of the Fort Morgan, CO Micropolitan Statistical Area. The population of the Trail Side CDP was 157 at the United States Census 2020. The Fort Morgan post office (Zip Code 80701) serves the area.

== Geography ==
The Trail Side CDP has an area of 459 acres (1.856 km^{2}), all land.

== Demographics ==
The United States Census Bureau initially defined the Trail Side CDP for the United States Census 2010.

Trail Side CDP, Colorado
Year	Pop.	±%
2010	59	—
2020	157	+166.1%
Source: United States Census Bureau

== See also ==
- Fort Morgan Micropolitan Statistical Area
