= Edward W. Estlow =

American journalist and businessman (1920–2015)

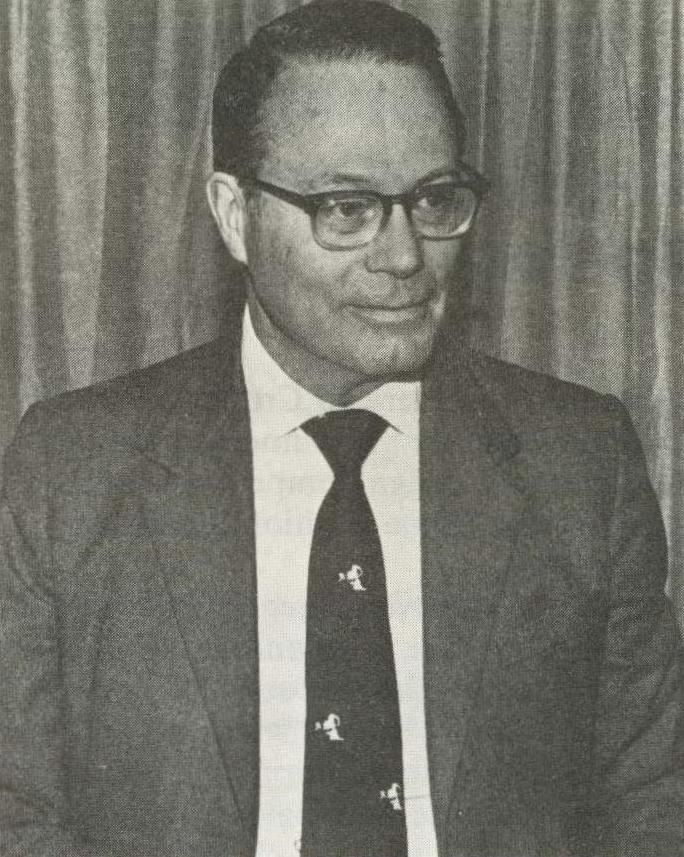
- Estlow circa 1982
- Born: Edward Walker Estlow; March 20, 1920; Snyder, Colorado, U.S.
- Died: May 9, 2015 (aged 95); Denver, Colorado, U.S.
- Education: University of Denver
- Occupations: Journalist, businessman
- Spouse: Charlotte Estlow
- Children: 4

Edward Walker Estlow (March 20, 1920 – May 9, 2015) was a journalist and businessman, best known as CEO at the E. W. Scripps Company from 1976 to 1985. The Edward W. and Charlotte A. Estlow International Center for Journalism and New Media at the University of Denver, and the Edward Estlow Printing Plant of the Denver Newspaper Agency, were both named after him. Estlow was also known as a college football player.

== Early life and football ==
Estlow was born in Snyder, Colorado in 1920. He attended the University of Denver from 1939 to 1942. He holds the all-time University of Denver record for most yards gained in one game, with 172 against the Wyoming Cowboys, and he also holds the fourth-longest play for yards gained by a running back on a non-scoring play (61 yards), also against the Cowboys. Estlow was named honorable mention in the all-Skyline Conference as a running back in 1941, and was also named the team's Most Valuable Player by his teammates in that year. He scored eight career touchdowns, leading Denver in touchdowns with four in 1941 and was second on the team in 1940, also with four. Estlow also excelled in the classroom, maintaining an academic scholarship for the duration of his studies at Denver.

== News career ==
Estlow began his career as a reporter with the Rocky Mountain News and worked his way up to Business Manager for the Rocky's owners, Scripps-Howard (formerly the E.W. Scripps Company), a position he held from 1971 to 1976. In 1976, Edward Estlow became the first CEO at Scripps-Howard who was not from the Scripps or Howard families. Estlow had become general business manager at Scripps-Howard in 1971. Under his leadership, the Scripps-Howard Company bought 90 percent of the Media Investment Company, so that employees could own shares in the diversified E.W. Scripps Company. Also under his leadership, Scripps oversaw several joint operating agreements, which Estlow viewed as "a matter of circumstance" related to declining profits in the newspaper industry. Estlow argued that newspapers with separate editorial staffs but shared advertising departments would benefit from raised advertising rates. Speaking of the 1978 joint operating agreement entered into by The Cincinnati Post and The Cincinnati Enquirer, Estlow noted, "When a community is unwilling to support two newspaper plants, we take a hard look at the joint venture option," a position that people at the Post and Enquirer argued was a better alternative than the closing of the Post altogether Also while he was CEO, the company spun off UPI, which had been originally established by E.W. Scripps, selling it to Media News Corporation. He retired from Scripps in 1985.

== Edward W. Estlow Printing Plant ==
The Edward W. Estlow Printing Plant in Denver was established when the Denver Newspaper Agency spent $100 million to upgrade its operation. The upgrade included five new presses, postpress and computer-to-plate equipment, new production software and an automated storage and retrieval system. The plant began operation in late 2006, printing both the Denver Post and the Rocky Mountain News (which closed operations in 2009).

== Edward W. and Charlotte A. Estlow International Center for Journalism & New Media ==
Edward Estlow began serving as a member of the Board of Trustees at the University of Denver in 1976. Prior to that, he had served as Alumni Association board member and as President of that organization from 1969–1971. Upon his retirement in 1985, the E.W. Scripps Company established the E.W. Estlow Fund in his honor. Beginning in 1992, the University of Denver utilized the Edward W. Estlow Fund for Journalism to invite a prominent journalist to campus each year to offer the Edward W. Estlow Lecture. In 1997, the Anvil of Freedom Award was established to recognize the Estlow Lecturer's leadership and commitment to the First Amendment. The Anvil of Freedom Award has been given to recognize the work of prominent journalists and innovators in journalistic endeavors. Some prior recipients have included Pulitzer prizewinning journalist David S. Broder, White House bureau chief Helen Thomas, Washington Post Editor-in-Chief Katharine Graham, CBS Evening News anchor Bob Schieffer, NPR host Renee Montagne, and the first worldwide citizen news initiative offering translations into more than 30 languages, Global Voices Online. In 2000, the Estlows worked with the University of Denver to establish the Edward W. Estlow International Center for Journalism and New Media. The Center continues to hold an annual event in honor of the year’s Anvil of Freedom Award recipient and also conducts several research projects involving students at the University of Denver in investigations related to the future of news, intercultural news initiatives, and digital media in the everyday lives of parents and their children.

== Personal life ==
Edward Estlow and his wife Charlotte Estlow have four children: Susan (Mrs. Carl Lyday), DU ’68 BA; Nancy Gwin; Sally (Mrs. Ray Baier); Mary Ann (Mrs. Terrance L. Erculiani), DU ’74 BFA. Ed's Grandson, Andrew E. Hawes (Nancy Gwin) also attended DU ('92). Estlow died in Denver in 2015.
