= Saddle Ridge, Colorado =

Census-designated place in Morgan County, CO, USA

- Census-designated place
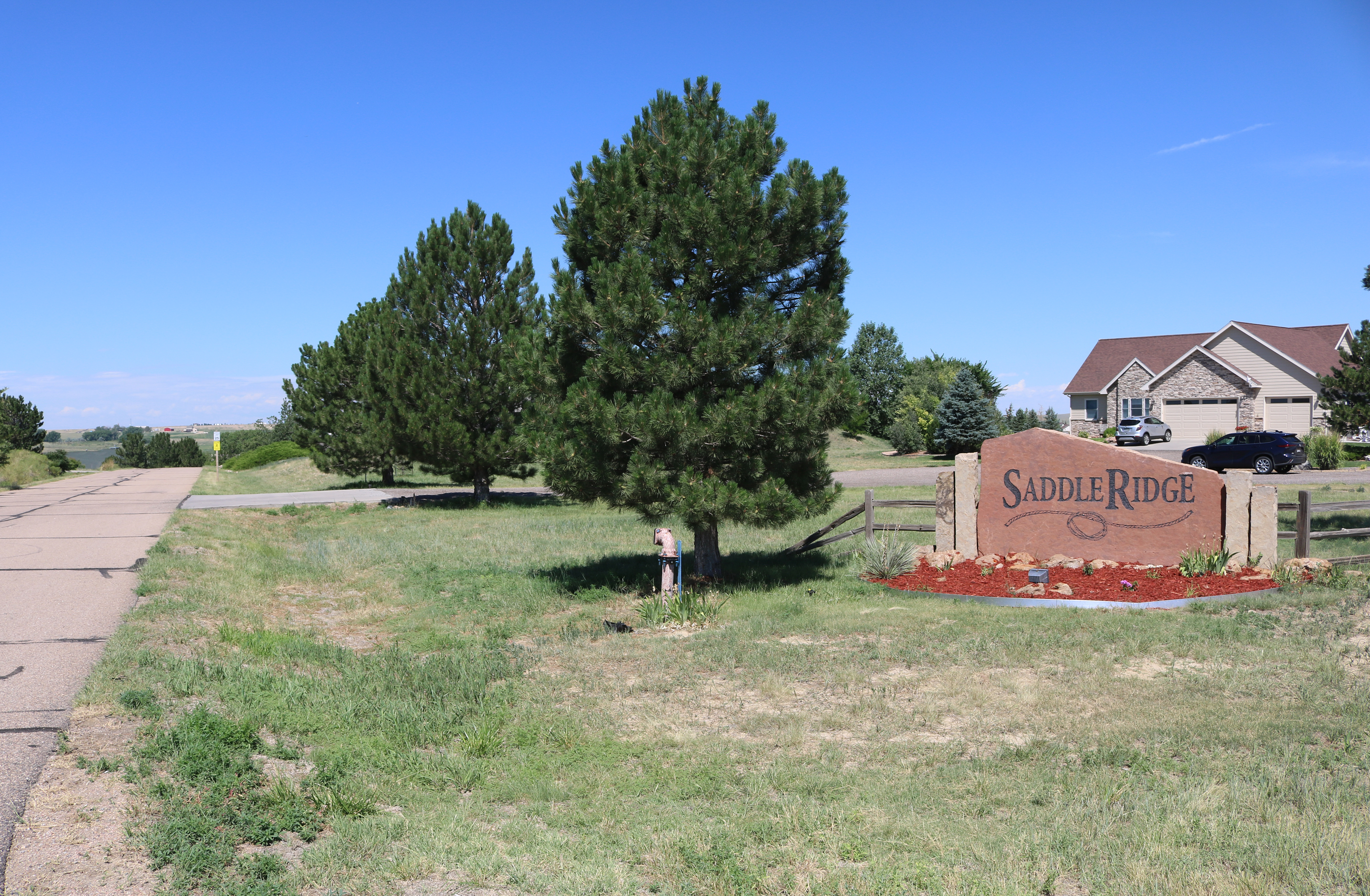
- The Saddle Ridge subdivision entrance

- Location of the Saddle Ridge CDP in Morgan County, Colorado
- Coordinates: 40°18′47″N 103°48′08″W
- Country: United States
- State: Colorado
- County: Morgan County

Government
  - Type: unincorporated community

Area
  - Total: 0.174 sq mi (0.451 km^{2})
  - Land: 0.174 sq mi (0.451 km^{2})
  - Water: 0 sq mi (0.000 km^{2})
- Elevation: 4,479 ft (1,365 m)

Population (2020)
  - Total: 66
  - Density: 380/sq mi (150/km^{2})
- Time zone: UTC-7 (MST)
  - Summer (DST): UTC-6 (MDT)
- ZIP Code: Fort Morgan 80701
- Area code: 970
- GNIS feature ID: 2583289

Saddle Ridge is an unincorporated community and a census-designated place (CDP) located in and governed by Morgan County, Colorado, United States. The CDP is a part of the Fort Morgan, CO Micropolitan Statistical Area. The population of the Saddle Ridge CDP was 66 at the United States Census 2020. The Fort Morgan post office (Zip Code 80701) serves the area.

== Geography ==
The Saddle Ridge CDP has an area of 111 acres (0.451 km^{2}), all land.

== Demographics ==
The United States Census Bureau initially defined the Saddle Ridge CDP for the United States Census 2010.

Saddle Ridge CDP, Colorado
Year	Pop.	±%
2010	56	—
2020	66	+17.9%
Source: United States Census Bureau

== See also ==
- Fort Morgan Micropolitan Statistical Area
