= Blue Sky, Colorado =

Census-designated place in Morgan County, Colorado, United States

- census-designated place
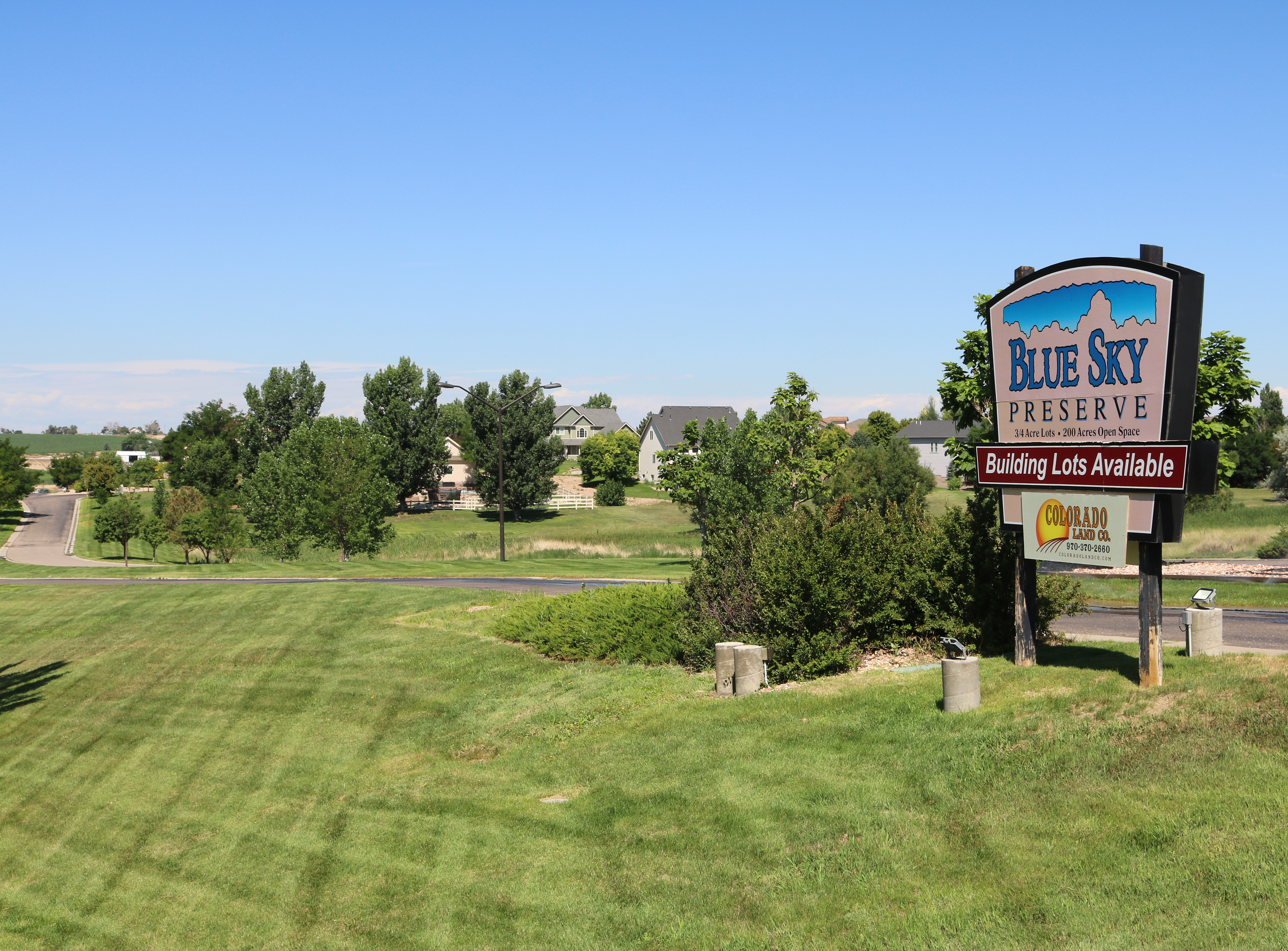
- The Blue Sky subdivision entrance

- Location of the Blue Sky CDP in Morgan County, Colorado.
- Coordinates: 40°18′00″N 103°48′20″W
- Country: United States
- State: Colorado
- County: Morgan

Government
  - Type: unincorporated community
  - Body: Morgan County

Area
  - Total: 0.036 sq mi (0.093 km^{2})
  - Land: 0.036 sq mi (0.093 km^{2})
  - Water: 0 sq mi (0.000 km^{2})
- Elevation: 4,387 ft (1,337 m)

Population (2020)
  - Total: 65
  - Density: 1,800/sq mi (700/km^{2})
- Time zone: UTC−07:00 (MST)
  - Summer (DST): UTC−06:00 (MDT)
- ZIP Code: Fort Morgan 80701
- Area code: 970
- GNIS CDP ID: 2583213
- FIPS code: 08-07420

Blue Sky is an unincorporated community and a census-designated place (CDP) located in Morgan County, Colorado, United States. The CDP is a part of the Fort Morgan, CO Micropolitan Statistical Area. The population of the Blue Sky CDP was 65 at the United States Census 2020. Blue Sky has never had a post office, but the Fort Morgan post office (Zip Code 80701) serves the area.

== Geography ==
At the 2020 United States Census, the Blue Sky CDP had an area of 23 acres (0.093 km^{2}), all land.

== Demographics ==
The United States Census Bureau initially defined the Blue Sky CDP for the United States Census 2010.

Blue Sky CDP, Colorado
Year	Pop.	±%
2010	24	—
2020	65	+170.8%
Source: United States Census Bureau

Blue Sky has 19 housing units and 23 total households. 63.6% of the population is employed and 50.8% of the population has a bachelor's degree or higher.

== See also ==
- Fort Morgan, CO Micropolitan Statistical Area
