= Jackson Lake, Colorado =

Unincorporated community in Morgan County, CO, USA

- Census-designated place
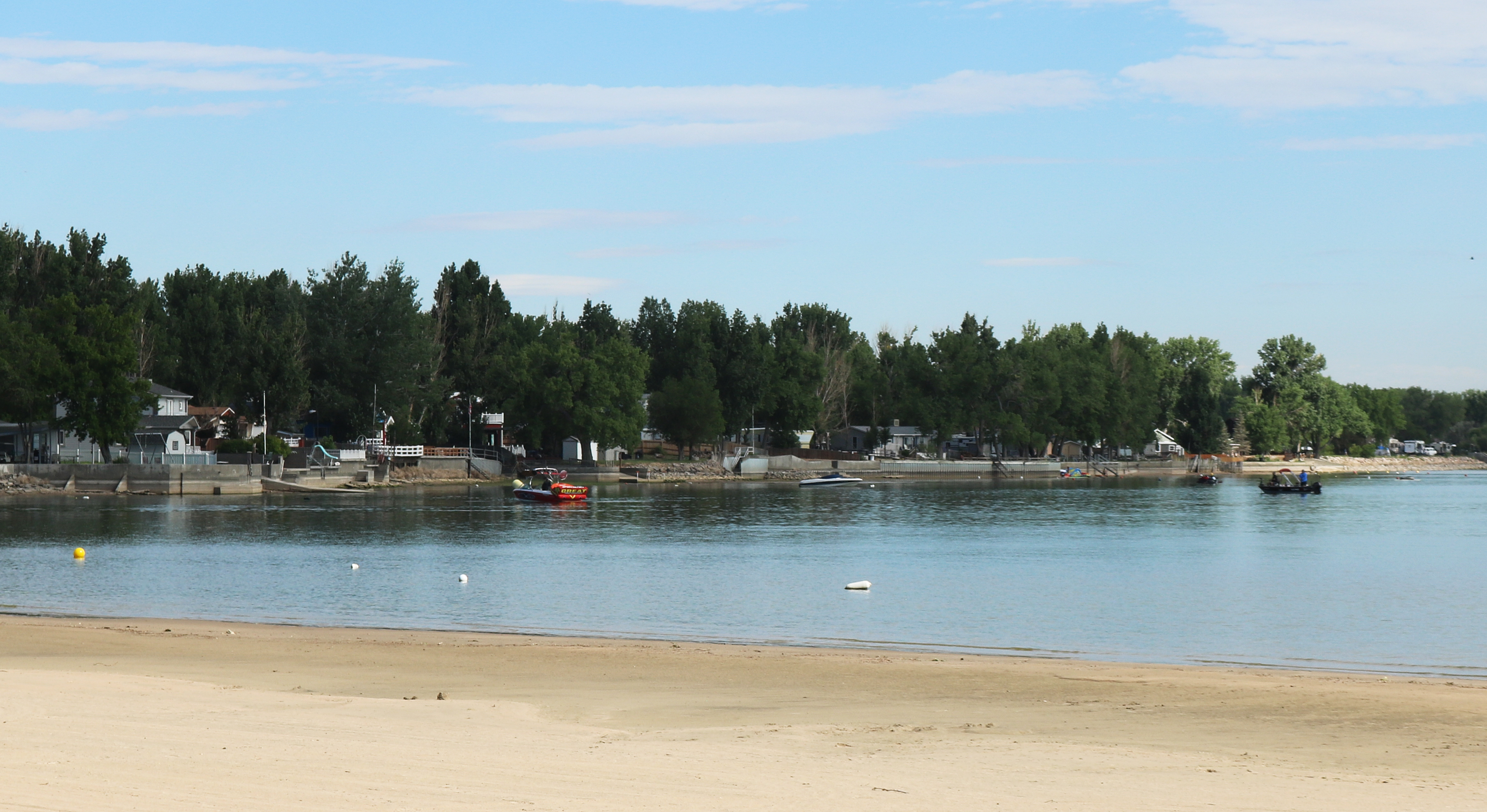
- Some of the homes in Jackson Lake along the lakeshore

- Location of the Jackson Lake CDP in Morgan County, Colorado
- Coordinates: 40°23′12″N 104°03′53″W
- Country: United States
- State: Colorado
- County: Morgan County

Government
  - Type: unincorporated community

Area
  - Total: 3.059 sq mi (7.924 km^{2})
  - Land: 3.059 sq mi (7.924 km^{2})
  - Water: 0 sq mi (0.000 km^{2})
- Elevation: 4,406 ft (1,343 m)

Population (2020)
  - Total: 131
  - Density: 42.8/sq mi (16.5/km^{2})
- Time zone: UTC-7 (MST)
  - Summer (DST): UTC-6 (MDT)
- ZIP Code: Weldona 80653
- Area code: 970
- GNIS featureID: 2583251

Jackson Lake is an unincorporated community and a census-designated place (CDP) located in and governed by Morgan County, Colorado, United States. The CDP is a part of the Fort Morgan, CO Micropolitan Statistical Area. The population of the Jackson Lake CDP was 131 at the United States Census 2020. The Weldona post office (Zip Code 80653) serves the area.

== Geography ==
The Jackson Lake CDP has an area of 1,958 acres (7.924 km^{2}), all land.

=== Jackson Lake State Park ===
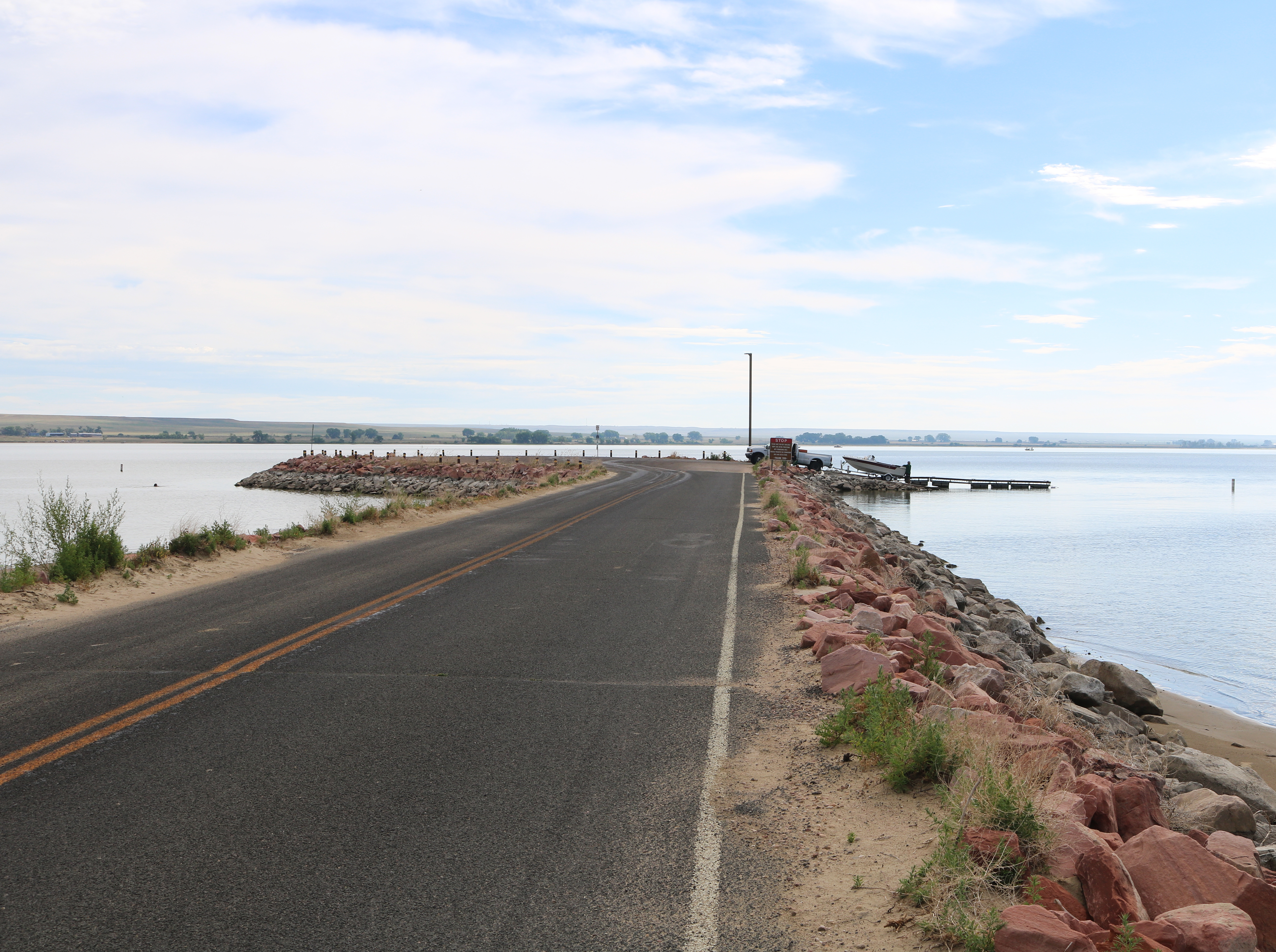
Boat ramp, with a view across the lake

In 1969, Jackson Lake State Park was established on the west bank of the 2,411-acre (9.76 km^{2}) Jackson reservoir just northwest of Jackson Lake. At 4,429 feet (1,350 m),, the reservoir receives water from the South Platte River and stores it for irrigation throughout the summer months. The park has an OHV track, and is used for camping, fishing, bird watching, boating, and hunting. It recorded over 300,000 annual visitors in 2021.

== Demographics ==
The United States Census Bureau initially defined the Jackson Lake CDP for the United States Census 2010.

Jackson Lake CDP, Colorado
Year	Pop.	±%
2010	154	—
2020	131	−14.9%
Source: United States Census Bureau

== See also ==
- Jackson Lake State Park
