= Morgan County, Colorado =

County in Colorado, United States

- County
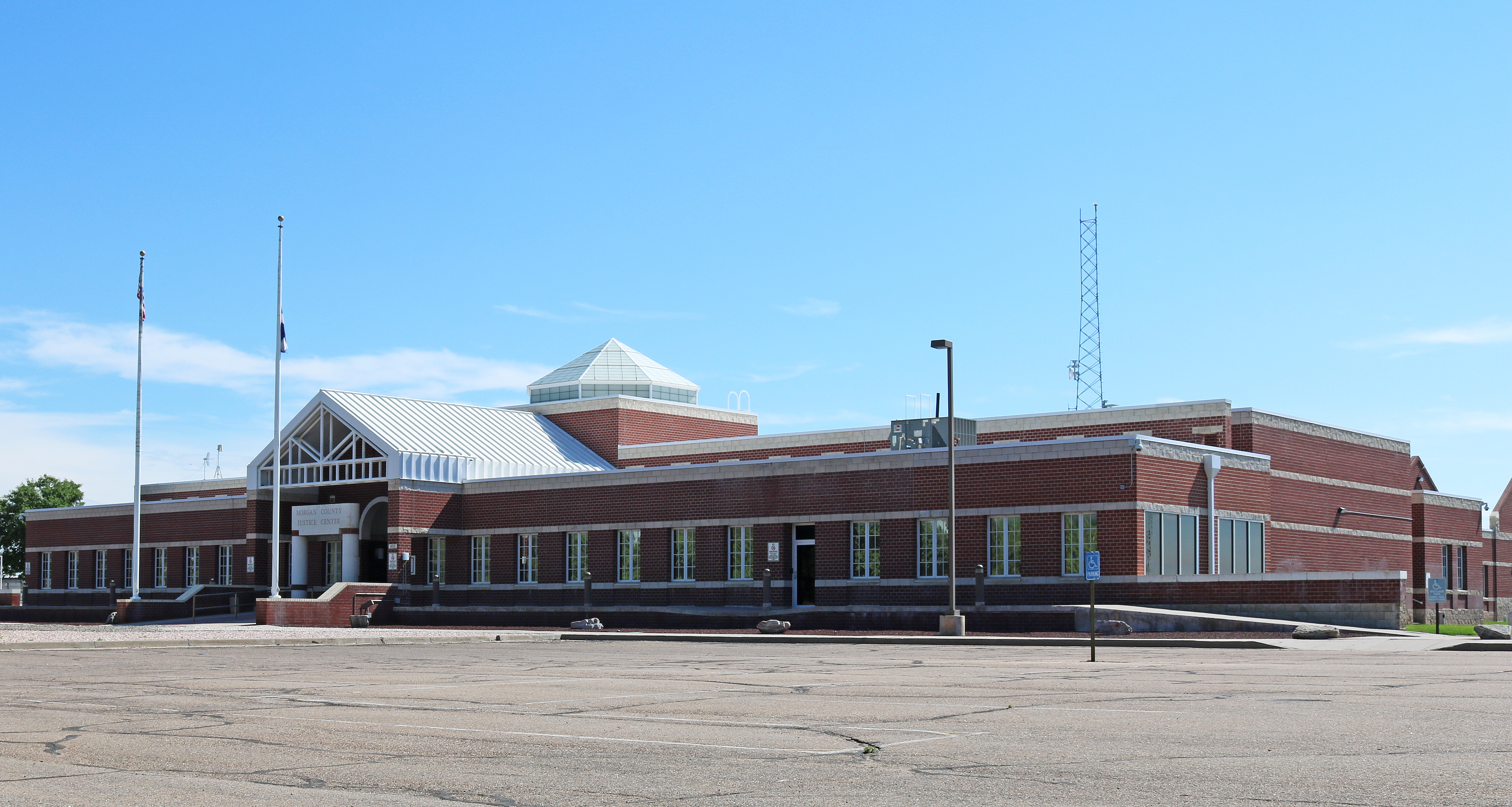
- The Morgan County Justice Center in Fort Morgan

- Location within the U.S. state of Colorado
- Coordinates: 40.26°N 103.81°W
- Country: United States
- State: Colorado
- Founded: February 19, 1889
- Named for: Christopher A. Morgan
- Seat: Fort Morgan
- Largest city: Fort Morgan

Area
  - Total: 1,294 sq mi (3,350 km^{2})
  - Land: 1,280 sq mi (3,300 km^{2})
  - Water: 13 sq mi (34 km^{2}) 1.0%

Population (2020)
  - Total: 29,111
  - Estimate (2025): 30,306 ▲
  - Density: 23/sq mi (8.9/km^{2})
- Time zone: UTC−7 (Mountain)
  - Summer (DST): UTC−6 (MDT)
- Congressional district: 4th
- Website: morgancounty.colorado.gov

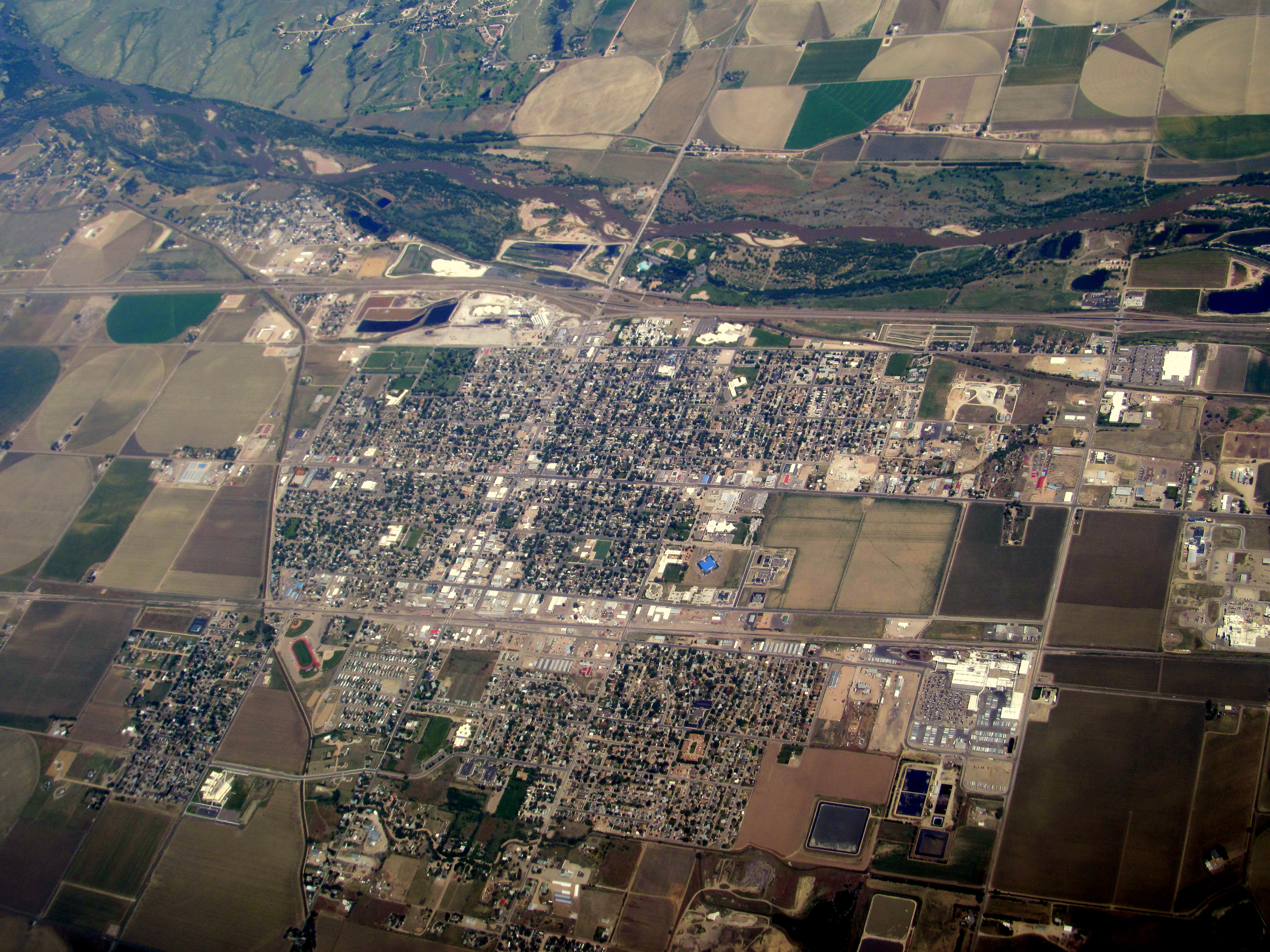
Aerial view of Fort Morgan (2017)

Morgan County is a county located in the U.S. state of Colorado. As of the 2020 census, the population was 29,111. The county seat is Fort Morgan. The county was named after old Fort Morgan, which in turn was named in honor of Colonel Christopher A. Morgan.

Morgan County comprises the Fort Morgan micropolitan area (a Micropolitan Statistical Area).

== Geography ==
According to the U.S. Census Bureau, the county has a total area of 1,294 square miles (3,350 km^{2}), of which 1,280 square miles (3,300 km^{2}) is land and 13 square miles (34 km^{2}) (1.0%) is water.

=== Adjacent counties ===
- Logan County - northeast
- Washington County - east, southeast
- Adams County - southwest
- Weld County - north, west

=== Major highways ===
- Interstate 76
- I-76 BL
- U.S. Highway 6
- U.S. Highway 34
- State Highway 39
- State Highway 52
- State Highway 71
- State Highway 144

=== State protected area ===
- Jackson Lake State Park

=== Trails and byways ===
- American Discovery Trail
- Pawnee Pioneer Trails
- South Platte Trail

== Demographics ==
Historical population
Census	Pop.	Note	%±
1890	1,601		—
1900	3,268		104.1%
1910	9,577		193.1%
1920	16,124		68.4%
1930	18,284		13.4%
1940	17,214		−5.9%
1950	18,074		5.0%
1960	21,192		17.3%
1970	20,105		−5.1%
1980	22,513		12.0%
1990	21,939		−2.5%
2000	27,171		23.8%
2010	28,159		3.6%
2020	29,111		3.4%
2025 (est.)	30,306	▲	4.1%
U.S. Decennial Census; 1790-1960 1900-1990; 1990-2000 2010-2020

A July 1, 2023 U.S. Census Bureau estimate placed the population at 29,524.

=== 2020 census ===
As of the 2020 census, the county had a population of 29,111. Of the residents, 26.5% were under the age of 18 and 16.7% were 65 years of age or older; the median age was 36.5 years. For every 100 females there were 100.5 males, and for every 100 females age 18 and over there were 99.5 males. 65.4% of residents lived in urban areas and 34.6% lived in rural areas.

Morgan County, Colorado – Racial and ethnic composition Note: the US Census treats Hispanic/Latino as an ethnic category. This table excludes Latinos from the racial categories and assigns them to a separate category. Hispanics/Latinos may be of any race.
Race / Ethnicity (NH = Non-Hispanic)	Pop 2000	Pop 2010	Pop 2020	% 2000	% 2010	% 2020
White alone (NH)	18,191	17,370	16,546	66.95%	61.69%	56.84%
Black or African American alone (NH)	57	755	935	0.21%	2.68%	3.21%
Native American or Alaska Native alone (NH)	132	102	110	0.49%	0.36%	0.38%
Asian alone (NH)	47	135	153	0.17%	0.48%	0.53%
Pacific Islander alone (NH)	24	10	11	0.09%	0.04%	0.04%
Other race alone (NH)	23	35	77	0.08%	0.12%	0.26%
Mixed race or Multiracial (NH)	224	246	713	0.82%	0.87%	2.45%
Hispanic or Latino (any race)	8,473	9,506	10,566	31.18%	33.76%	36.29%
Total	27,171	28,159	29,111	100.00%	100.00%	100.00%

The racial makeup of the county was 65.9% White, 3.3% Black or African American, 1.4% American Indian and Alaska Native, 0.5% Asian, 0.0% Native Hawaiian and Pacific Islander, 15.2% from some other race, and 13.6% from two or more races. Hispanic or Latino residents of any race comprised 36.3% of the population.

There were 10,519 households in the county, of which 34.6% had children under the age of 18 living with them and 23.6% had a female householder with no spouse or partner present. About 25.6% of all households were made up of individuals and 12.1% had someone living alone who was 65 years of age or older.

There were 11,493 housing units, of which 8.5% were vacant. Among occupied housing units, 67.9% were owner-occupied and 32.1% were renter-occupied. The homeowner vacancy rate was 1.3% and the rental vacancy rate was 7.5%.

=== 2000 census ===
At the 2000 census there were 27,171 people, 9,539 households, and 6,973 families living in the county. The population density was 21 people per square mile (8.1 people/km^{2}). There were 10,410 housing units at an average density of 8 units per square mile (3.1 units/km^{2}). The racial makeup of the county was 79.65% White, 0.33% Black or African American, 0.81% Native American, 0.17% Asian, 0.17% Pacific Islander, 16.37% from other races, and 2.48% from two or more races. 31.18% of the population were Hispanic or Latino of any race. Of the 19,539 households 37.90% had children under the age of 18 living with them, 59.70% were married couples living together, 9.00% had a female householder with no husband present, and 26.90% were non-families. 23.00% of households were one person and 10.90% were one person aged 65 or older. The average household size was 2.80 and the average family size was 3.29.

The age distribution was 30.40% under the age of 18, 8.50% from 18 to 24, 28.20% from 25 to 44, 19.80% from 45 to 64, and 13.00% 65 or older. The median age was 34 years. For every 100 females there were 100.40 males. For every 100 females age 18 and over, there were 98.30 males.

The median household income was $34,568 and the median family income was $39,102. Males had a median income of $27,361 versus $21,524 for females. The per capita income for the county was $15,492. About 8.50% of families and 12.40% of the population were below the poverty line, including 15.30% of those under age 18 and 9.50% of those age 65 or over.

== Communities ==
=== Cities ===
- Brush
- Fort Morgan

=== Towns ===
- Hillrose
- Log Lane Village
- Wiggins

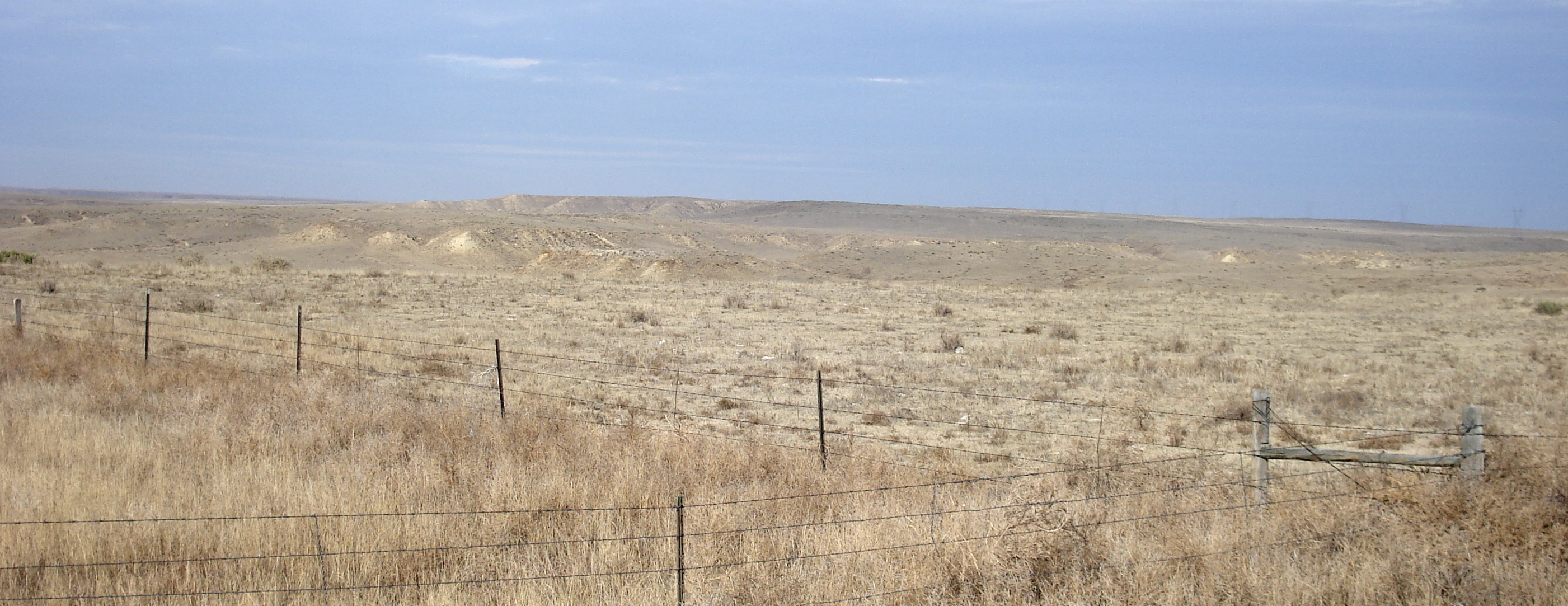
Countryside in northern Morgan County

=== Census-designated places ===
- Blue Sky
- Jackson Lake
- Morgan Heights
- Orchard
- Saddle Ridge
- Snyder
- Trail Side
- Weldona

=== Other unincorporated communities ===
- Goodrich
- Hoyt

== Politics ==
Morgan County has long been one of the Republican Party's major strongholds in Colorado. It was one of only three Colorado counties (the others being El Paso County and Larimer County) to vote for the re-election of Herbert Hoover in 1932, and the only Democrat to obtain an absolute majority in the county since 1920 has been Lyndon Johnson in 1964 – although Roosevelt did win a plurality in 1936.

United States presidential election results for Morgan County, Colorado
Year	Republican		Democratic		Third party(ies)	
Year	No.	%	No.	%	No.	%
1892	208	47.60%	0	0.00%	229	52.40%
1896	211	25.54%	602	72.88%	13	1.57%
1900	723	55.32%	538	41.16%	46	3.52%
1904	1,136	66.90%	406	23.91%	156	9.19%
1908	1,672	55.02%	1,208	39.75%	159	5.23%
1912	855	28.16%	1,005	33.10%	1,176	38.74%
1916	1,541	37.99%	2,371	58.46%	144	3.55%
1920	3,114	70.45%	1,105	25.00%	201	4.55%
1924	3,321	69.99%	757	15.95%	667	14.06%
1928	4,197	76.10%	1,242	22.52%	76	1.38%
1932	3,370	49.82%	3,181	47.02%	214	3.16%
1936	3,058	47.18%	3,146	48.54%	277	4.27%
1940	4,654	64.30%	2,527	34.91%	57	0.79%
1944	4,166	69.13%	1,839	30.52%	21	0.35%
1948	3,417	53.54%	2,912	45.63%	53	0.83%
1952	5,371	69.63%	2,297	29.78%	46	0.60%
1956	5,325	64.17%	2,956	35.62%	17	0.20%
1960	5,092	61.65%	3,151	38.15%	16	0.19%
1964	3,228	42.93%	4,271	56.80%	21	0.28%
1968	4,598	61.21%	2,310	30.75%	604	8.04%
1972	5,365	70.40%	2,081	27.31%	175	2.30%
1976	4,603	53.34%	3,798	44.01%	228	2.64%
1980	5,209	62.50%	2,246	26.95%	879	10.55%
1984	6,097	71.26%	2,331	27.24%	128	1.50%
1988	4,795	55.24%	3,728	42.95%	157	1.81%
1992	3,724	41.70%	2,985	33.43%	2,221	24.87%
1996	4,557	52.34%	3,347	38.44%	803	9.22%
2000	5,722	63.59%	2,885	32.06%	391	4.35%
2004	6,787	68.31%	3,039	30.59%	110	1.11%
2008	6,272	61.29%	3,813	37.26%	149	1.46%
2012	6,602	61.26%	3,912	36.30%	263	2.44%
2016	8,145	68.10%	3,151	26.35%	664	5.55%
2020	9,593	69.80%	3,876	28.20%	275	2.00%
2024	9,830	73.00%	3,291	24.44%	344	2.55%

United States Senate election results for Morgan County, Colorado2
Year	Republican		Democratic		Third party(ies)	
Year	No.	%	No.	%	No.	%
2020	9,544	70.33%	3,787	27.91%	240	1.77%

United States Senate election results for Morgan County, Colorado3
Year	Republican		Democratic		Third party(ies)	
Year	No.	%	No.	%	No.	%
2022	7,000	68.84%	2,786	27.40%	383	3.77%

Colorado Gubernatorial election results for Morgan County
Year	Republican		Democratic		Third party(ies)	
Year	No.	%	No.	%	No.	%
2022	7,090	69.82%	2,679	26.38%	385	3.79%

In other statewide elections, the county also leans strongly Republican, although it was carried by Democrat Roy Romer in 1990 – when he carried all but four counties statewide – by Dick Lamm in 1982 and by Constitution Party candidate Tom Tancredo in 2010.

== See also ==
- Bibliography of Colorado
- Geography of Colorado
- History of Colorado
  - National Register of Historic Places listings in Morgan County, Colorado
- Index of Colorado-related articles
- List of Colorado-related lists
  - List of counties in Colorado
  - List of statistical areas in Colorado
- Outline of Colorado
