= Sam Brunelli =

American football player (born 1943)

No. 68, 64, 72
- Positions: Tackle, guard

Personal information
- Born: December 13, 1943 (age 82); Fort Morgan, Colorado, U.S.
- Listed height: 6 ft 2 in (1.88 m)
- Listed weight: 270 lb (122 kg)

Career information
- High school: Weldon Valley (Weldona, Colorado)
- College: Colorado State

Career history
- Denver Broncos (1966–1972)
- Stats at Pro Football Reference

Samuel Aldino Brunelli (born December 13, 1943) is an American former professional football offensive lineman who played six seasons with the Denver Broncos. He played college football at Colorado State College.

== Early life and college ==
Samuel Aldino Brunelli was born on December 13, 1943, in Fort Morgan, Colorado. He attended Weldon Valley High School in Weldona, Colorado.

Brunelli played college football for the Colorado State–Greeley Bears of Colorado State College.

== Professional career ==
Brunelli signed with the Denver Broncos of the American Football League in 1966. He played in two games for the Broncos that year and spent part of the season on the taxi squad. He appeared in 12 games, starting 11, in 1967. Brunelli started all 14 games during the 1968 season as the Broncos went 5–9. He started all 14 games for the second consecutive year in 1969 as the Broncos finished with a 5–8–1 record. Brunelli played in 13 games, starting 12, in 1970 during the team's first season in the NFL and recovered two fumbles. He appeared in five games, starting four, during the 1971 season. He was placed on injured reserve in 1972 and did not appear in any games that year. Brunelli was released by the Broncos in 1973.
