= Snyder, Colorado =

Census-designated place in Morgan County, CO, USA

- Census-designated place
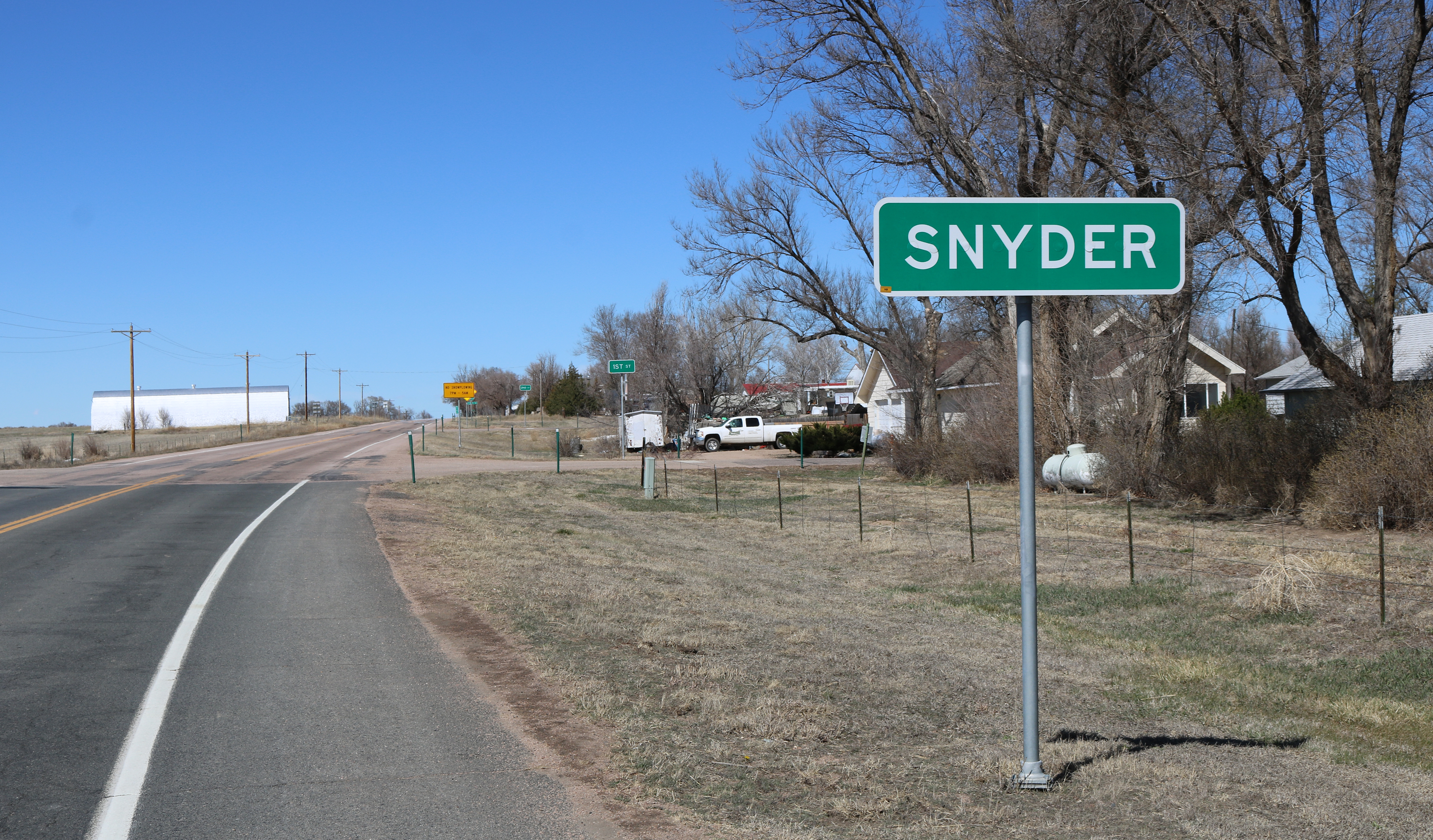
- Snyder, looking north on Colorado State Highway 71

- Location in Morgan County, Colorado
- Coordinates: 40°19′51″N 103°35′31″W
- Country: United States
- State: Colorado
- County: Morgan County

Government
  - Type: unincorporated community

Area
  - Total: 0.354 sq mi (0.917 km^{2})
  - Land: 0.354 sq mi (0.917 km^{2})
  - Water: 0 sq mi (0.000 km^{2})
- Elevation: 4,180 ft (1,270 m)

Population (2010)
  - Total: 136
  - Density: 384/sq mi (148.3/km^{2})
- Time zone: UTC-7 (MST)
  - Summer (DST): UTC-6 (MDT)
- ZIP Code: 80750
- Area code: 970
- GNIS feature ID: 2583298

Snyder is an unincorporated town, a post office, and a census-designated place (CDP) located in and governed by Morgan County, Colorado, United States. The CDP is a part of the Fort Morgan, CO Micropolitan Statistical Area. The Snyder post office has the ZIP Code 80750. As of the 2020 census, the population of the Snyder CDP was 136.

== History ==
The town is named after John Wesley Snyder (1837-1922), a pioneer rancher.

== Geography ==
Snyder is in eastern Morgan County, on the north side of the valley of the South Platte River. It is 15 miles (24 km) northeast of Fort Morgan, the county seat. Colorado State Highway 71 passes through the community, leading south 6 miles (10 km) to Brush and north 67 miles (108 km) to Kimball, Nebraska.

The Snyder CDP has an area of 227 acres (0.917 km^{2}), all land.

== Demographics ==
The United States Census Bureau initially defined the Snyder CDP for the United States Census 2010.

Snyder CDP, Colorado
Year	Pop.	±%
2010	132	—
2020	136	+3.0%
Source: United States Census Bureau

== See also ==
- Fort Morgan Micropolitan Statistical Area
