= Robert G. Whitehead =

American businessman (1916–2007)

Robert George Whitehead
- Born: October 31, 1916; Fort Morgan, Colorado, USA
- Died: February 22, 2007 (aged 90); Laredo, Webb County, Texas
- Occupations: Businessman; Marketed Blue Star Ointment
- Spouse: Persis Whitehead
- Children: 7 children: Daniel Whitehead (deceased); Danielle W. Snider; Patricia "Treecy" Leigh June, Gail, Henry, and Kathryn Whitehead

Robert George Whitehead (October 31, 1916 – February 22, 2007) was a Texas businessman who created Quaker House Products, Inc., which produced and marketed the first-aid treatment known as "Blue Star Ointment"; some 50 million jars are sold annually in the United States. Whitehead was a marketing maverick who used an innovative memorable 10-second television commercial to sell Blue Star Ointment. These shorter ads cost less than a traditional 30-second commercial to both produce and air. Whitehead packed all the information into a shorter time frame to attract customers through the old marketing format of an auctioneer.

== Biography ==
Whitehead was born in Fort Morgan in northeastern Colorado. His mother's family traces their roots to the pre-Revolutionary War period. Robert Whitehead's daughters are still both affiliated with the Daughters of the American Revolution. Whitehead's father, Dan, was a third-generation cattle broker and an auctioneer. Whitehead said that much of his early business success came from his father's direction. In 1882, Dan Whitehead's family established the town of Oakland in Pottawattamie County, Iowa.

Whitehead began his sales career with the Gail Borden Company in New York City; he moved to Corpus Christi, Texas, to accept a sales director position with Amalie Oil Company. Later, he founded Quaker Products from his home in Houston and obtained the rights to distribute Blue Star Ointment, which became his firm's primary product; Quaker Products also offered a cleaner for steam irons.

Whitehead often remarked that Blue Star Ointment successfully treated his painful psoriasis, which he suffered with since his teenage years. The product also offers relief from various types of itching from eczema to insect bites, ringworm, jock itch, and athlete's foot. Blue Star's original formula was created in the 1920s by the apothecary and pharmacist Adolf Gottlieb, a German immigrant. Gottlieb sold his Blue Star formula in the 1930s to traveling salesman Jim Bourland of Fort Worth, Texas. When Bourland died, Robert Whitehead acquired the rights thereafter, and sales began to skyrocket. Whitehead's older son, Henry Whitehead, and daughter Gail Whitehead assisted him in the family-owned and operated business.

Whitehead was largely self-educated; he developed a great interest and talent for literature and art. From 1955 to 1967, he was associated with the Great Book Council of Houston and led Great Books discussion clubs associated with Rice University. His art work has been displayed in galleries and museums in Houston and throughout Texas. He worked in watercolor, acrylic, and oil and developed a unique abstract style.

Whitehead spent his later years in Laredo in Webb County in south Texas. He was survived by his wife, Persis Whitehead, and six of his seven children, Danielle Snider of Charlottesville, Virginia, Patricia Leigh of Houston, June Whitehead of Houston, Gail Whitehead of San Antonio and Laredo, Henry Henry Whitehead of Laredo, and Kathryn Whitehead of New York City. Another son, Daniel Whitehead, predeceased his father.
