= Christopher Anthony Morgan =

Union Army colonel

- Born: Cincinnati, Ohio
- Died: 20 January 1866; St. Louis, Missouri
- Burial place: Spring Grove Cemetery, Cincinnati, Ohio
- Relatives: Father: Ephraim Morgan (co-founder of the Cincinnati Gazette newspaper)
- Military career
- Allegiance: United States of America; Union
- Branch: Army
- Service years: 1861–1865
- Rank: Colonel
- Unit: 39th Ohio Infantry Regiment

Christopher Anthony Morgan (died January 20, 1866) was a book publisher, literary club co-founder, and an American soldier who served as colonel of the 39th Ohio Infantry Regiment during the American Civil War, beginning in 1861. The military installation at Fort Morgan (Colorado), the city of Fort Morgan, Colorado, and Morgan County, Colorado are named for him. Morgan served as aide-de-camp to Brigadier General John Pope. Morgan died from inhalation of leaking coal gas, while sleeping during a visit to Pope's home on Chouteau Avenue in St. Louis.
