= Hillrose, Colorado =

Town in Colorado, United States

- Statutory Town
- Town of Hillrose
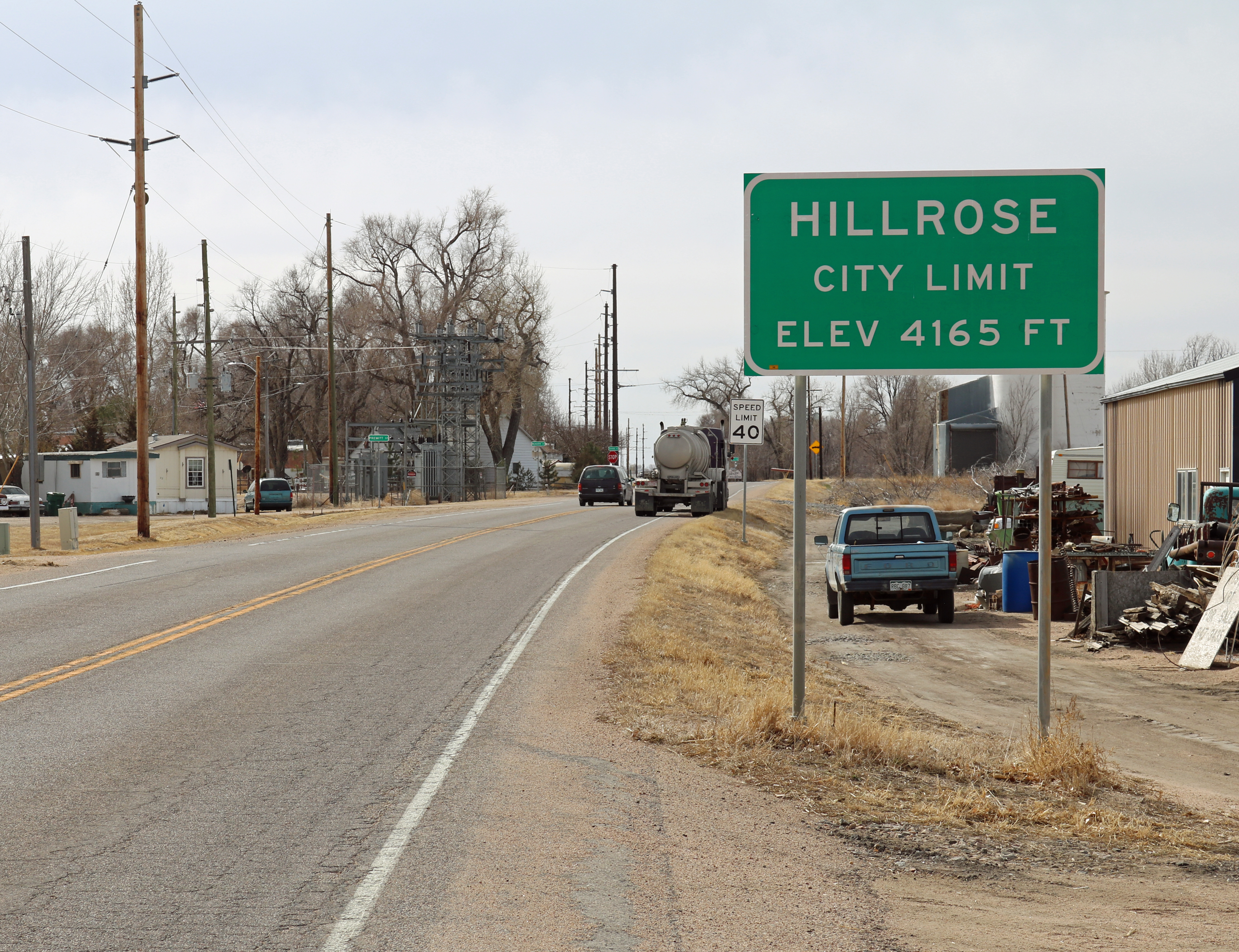
- Entering from the northeast.

- Location of the Town of Hillrose in Morgan County, Colorado
- Coordinates: 40°19′28″N 103°31′20″W
- Country: United States
- State: Colorado
- County: Morgan County
- Incorporated (town): May 20, 1919 government_footnotes =

Government
  - Type: Statutory Town

Area
  - Statutory Town: 0.188 sq mi (0.488 km^{2})
  - Land: 0.188 sq mi (0.488 km^{2})
  - Water: 0 sq mi (0.000 km^{2})
- Elevation: 4,170 ft (1,270 m)

Population (2020)
  - Statutory Town: 312
  - Density: 1,656/sq mi (639/km^{2})
  - Metro: 29,111
- Time zone: UTC−07:00 (MST)
  - Summer (DST): UTC−06:00 (MDT)
- ZIP code: 80733
- Area code: 970
- FIPS code: 08-36610
- GNIS feature ID: 2412751
- Website: www.hillrosecolorado.org

The Town of Hillrose is a statutory town located in Morgan County, Colorado, United States. The town population was 312 at the 2020 United States census, an 18.18% increase since the 2010 United States census.

== History ==
The town was named after Rose Hill Emerson, daughter of early landholder.

== Geography ==
At the 2020 United States census, the town had a total area of 121 acres (0.488 km^{2}), all of it land.

== Demographics ==
Historical population
Census	Pop.	Note	%±
1930	210		—
1940	177		−15.7%
1950	190		7.3%
1960	157		−17.4%
1970	121		−22.9%
1980	213		76.0%
1990	169		−20.7%
2000	254		50.3%
2010	264		3.9%
2020	312		18.2%
U.S. Decennial Census

As of the census of 2000, there were 254 people, 93 households, and 69 families residing in the town. The population density was 1,144.3 inhabitants per square mile (441.8/km^{2}). There were 111 housing units at an average density of 500.1 per square mile (193.1/km^{2}). The racial makeup of the town was 92.52% White, 1.57% Native American, 0.39% Pacific Islander, 4.33% from other races, and 1.18% from two or more races. Hispanic or Latino of any race were 16.14% of the population.

There were 93 households, out of which 34.4% had children under the age of 18 living with them, 62.4% were married couples living together, 8.6% had a female householder with no husband present, and 25.8% were non-families. 18.3% of all households were made up of individuals, and 4.3% had someone living alone who was 65 years of age or older. The average household size was 2.73 and the average family size was 3.14.

In the town, the population was spread out, with 30.7% under the age of 18, 5.1% from 18 to 24, 30.3% from 25 to 44, 22.4% from 45 to 64, and 11.4% who were 65 years of age or older. The median age was 36 years. For every 100 females, there were 111.7 males. For every 100 females age 18 and over, there were 102.3 males.

The median income for a household in the town was $29,219, and the median income for a family was $30,750. Males had a median income of $23,333 versus $17,750 for females. The per capita income for the town was $11,179. About 8.5% of families and 10.4% of the population were below the poverty line, including 8.0% of those under the age of eighteen and 35.7% of those 65 or over.

== Climate ==
According to the Köppen Climate Classification system, Hillrose has a semi-arid climate, abbreviated "BSk" on climate maps.

Climate data for Hillrose, Colorado
Month	Jan	Feb	Mar	Apr	May	Jun	Jul	Aug	Sep	Oct	Nov	Dec	Year
Mean daily maximum °C (°F)	4 (39)	6 (43)	10 (50)	16 (61)	21 (70)	27 (81)	31 (88)	30 (86)	25 (77)	19 (66)	10 (50)	5 (41)	17 (63)
Mean daily minimum °C (°F)	−11 (13)	−8 (17)	−5 (23)	0 (32)	6 (43)	11 (52)	14 (58)	14 (57)	8 (47)	2 (36)	−5 (23)	−9 (16)	2 (35)
Average precipitation mm (inches)	10 (0.4)	10 (0.4)	25 (1)	36 (1.4)	81 (3.2)	66 (2.6)	74 (2.9)	48 (1.9)	30 (1.2)	23 (0.9)	15 (0.6)	10 (0.4)	420 (16.7)
Source: Weatherbase

== See also ==
- Fort Morgan, CO Micropolitan Statistical Area
