= Fort Morgan, Colorado =

City in Colorado, United States

- Home rule municipality
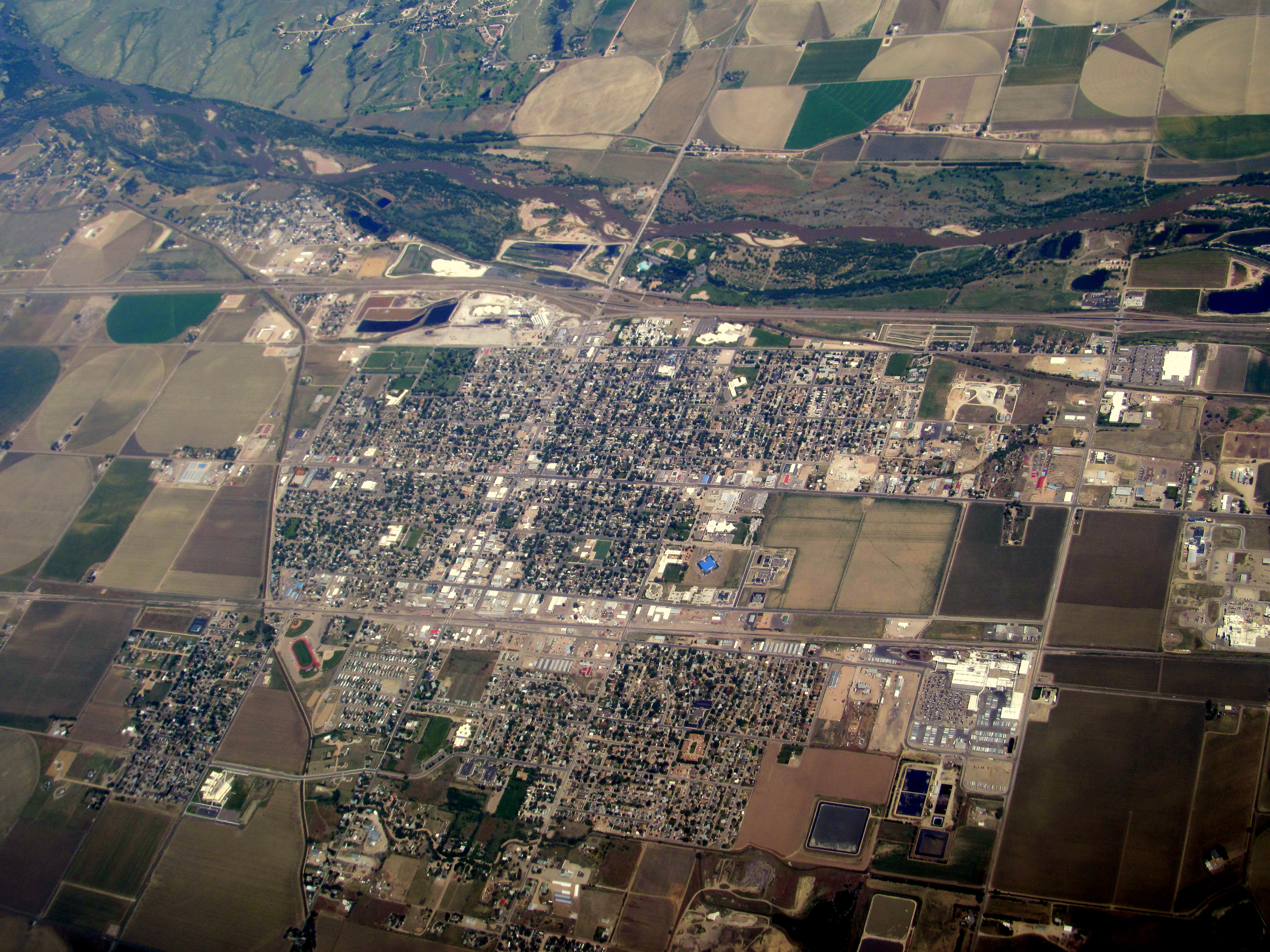
- Aerial view of Fort Morgan (2017)

- Seal
- Nickname: "The Capital of the Plains"
- Location of the City of Fort Morgan in Morgan County, Colorado
- Coordinates: 40°15′42″N 103°47′32″W
- Country: United States
- State: Colorado
- County: Morgan County seat
- Incorporated: June 15, 1887

Government
  - Type: Home rule municipality
  - Mayor: Kevin Lindell

Area
  - Home rule municipality: 5.403 sq mi (13.993 km^{2})
  - Land: 5.334 sq mi (13.815 km^{2})
  - Water: 0.069 sq mi (0.178 km^{2})
- Elevation: 4,318 ft (1,316 m)

Population (2020)
  - Home rule municipality: 11,597
  - Density: 2,174/sq mi (839/km^{2})
  - Metro: 29,111
- Time zone: UTC−07:00 (MST)
  - Summer (DST): UTC−06:00 (MDT)
- ZIP codes: 80701 & 80705
- Area code: 970
- FIPS code: 08-27810
- GNIS feature ID: 204722
- Website: www.cityoffortmorgan.com

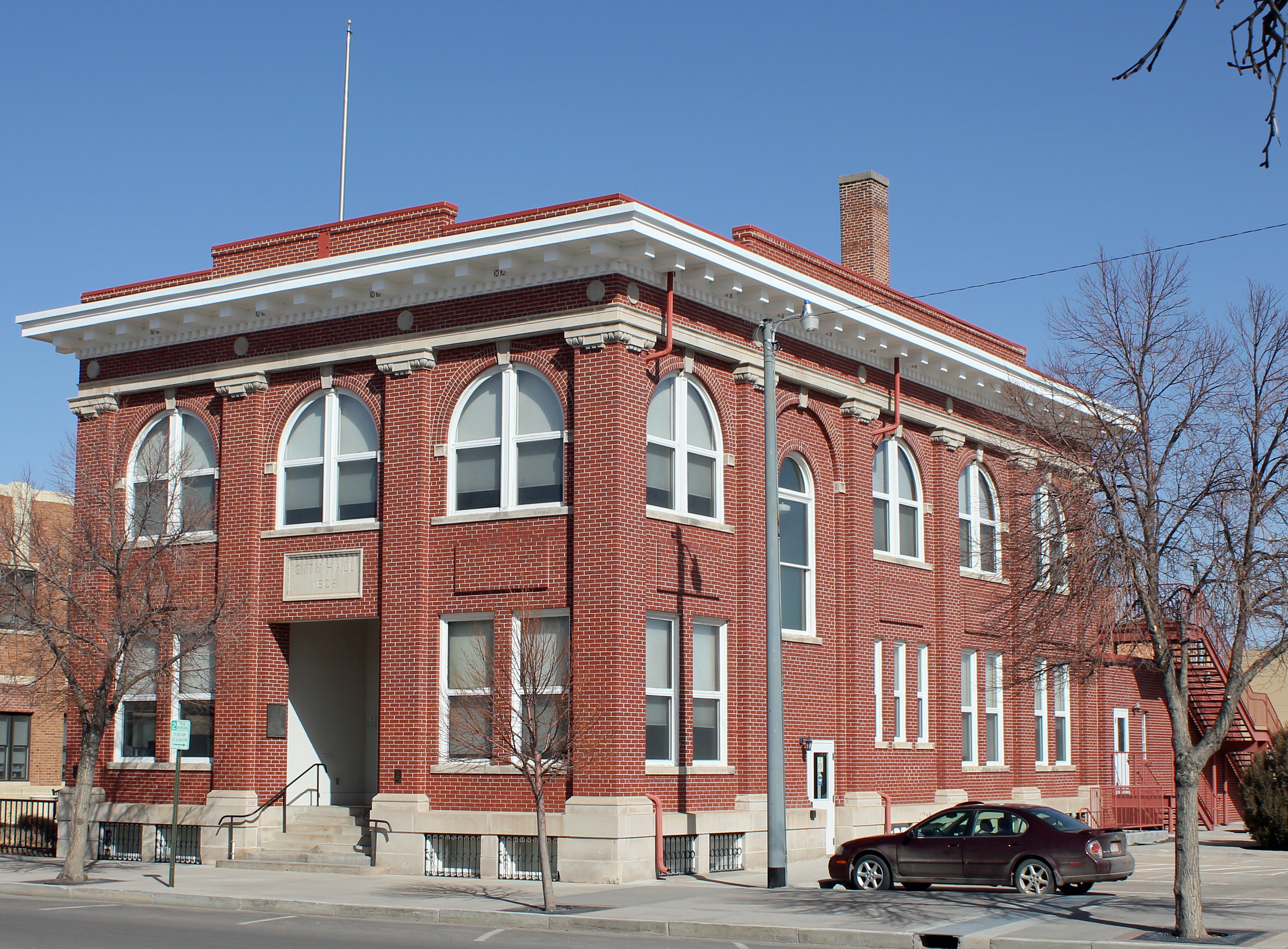
The Fort Morgan City Hall

Fort Morgan is the home rule municipality city that is the county seat of and the most populous municipality in Morgan County, Colorado, United States. The city population was 11,597 at the 2020 United States census. Fort Morgan is the principal city of the Fort Morgan, CO Micropolitan Statistical Area.

== History ==
=== Fort Morgan ===
Camp Wardwell was established in 1865 along the Overland Trail to protect emigrants and supplies going to and from Denver and the mining districts. The fort was renamed in 1866 by General John Pope for one of his staff, Colonel Christopher A. Morgan, who had died earlier that year. The fort closed in 1868 after being used by 19 different companies from 11 cavalry and infantry regiments (about 1,300 soldiers).

=== Town ===
The town of Fort Morgan was platted just south of the old military fort's ruins on May 1, 1884, by Abner S. Baker, a member of Greeley's Union Colony. The town became the county seat of the newly formed Morgan County on February 19, 1889.

In World War II, a military school at the Fort Morgan State Armory was part of the West Coast Air Corps Training Center.

== Geography ==
At the 2020 United States census, the town had a total area of 3,458 acres (13.993 km^{2}) including 44 acres (0.178 km^{2}) of water.

=== Climate ===
Fort Morgan exhibits a semi-arid climate (Köppen: BSk)

Climate data for Fort Morgan, Colorado, 1991–2020 normals, extremes 1896–present
Month	Jan	Feb	Mar	Apr	May	Jun	Jul	Aug	Sep	Oct	Nov	Dec	Year
Record high °F (°C)	75 (24)	82 (28)	85 (29)	93 (34)	100 (38)	106 (41)	109 (43)	105 (41)	103 (39)	97 (36)	85 (29)	84 (29)	109 (43)
Mean maximum °F (°C)	61.5 (16.4)	65.6 (18.7)	76.7 (24.8)	83.2 (28.4)	91.0 (32.8)	97.6 (36.4)	100.8 (38.2)	98.0 (36.7)	95.9 (35.5)	86.8 (30.4)	73.6 (23.1)	62.5 (16.9)	101.5 (38.6)
Mean daily maximum °F (°C)	41.6 (5.3)	44.9 (7.2)	56.0 (13.3)	63.2 (17.3)	72.4 (22.4)	84.0 (28.9)	90.2 (32.3)	88.0 (31.1)	80.5 (26.9)	66.3 (19.1)	52.2 (11.2)	41.8 (5.4)	65.1 (18.4)
Daily mean °F (°C)	27.1 (−2.7)	30.1 (−1.1)	40.4 (4.7)	48.1 (8.9)	57.9 (14.4)	68.8 (20.4)	75.0 (23.9)	72.4 (22.4)	63.8 (17.7)	50.0 (10.0)	36.8 (2.7)	27.5 (−2.5)	49.8 (9.9)
Mean daily minimum °F (°C)	12.7 (−10.7)	15.2 (−9.3)	24.9 (−3.9)	33.0 (0.6)	43.3 (6.3)	53.5 (11.9)	59.7 (15.4)	56.8 (13.8)	47.1 (8.4)	33.6 (0.9)	21.4 (−5.9)	13.1 (−10.5)	34.5 (1.4)
Mean minimum °F (°C)	−7.3 (−21.8)	−2.0 (−18.9)	8.9 (−12.8)	19.1 (−7.2)	30.8 (−0.7)	44.2 (6.8)	52.9 (11.6)	49.5 (9.7)	35.8 (2.1)	17.3 (−8.2)	4.3 (−15.4)	−4.4 (−20.2)	−13.2 (−25.1)
Record low °F (°C)	−35 (−37)	−41 (−41)	−26 (−32)	−1 (−18)	14 (−10)	30 (−1)	34 (1)	33 (1)	11 (−12)	−8 (−22)	−18 (−28)	−30 (−34)	−41 (−41)
Average precipitation inches (mm)	0.25 (6.4)	0.27 (6.9)	0.74 (19)	1.46 (37)	2.24 (57)	2.16 (55)	2.39 (61)	1.71 (43)	1.14 (29)	1.14 (29)	0.49 (12)	0.29 (7.4)	14.28 (362.7)
Average snowfall inches (cm)	3.8 (9.7)	3.9 (9.9)	3.8 (9.7)	1.7 (4.3)	0.3 (0.76)	0.0 (0.0)	0.0 (0.0)	0.0 (0.0)	0.0 (0.0)	2.1 (5.3)	2.7 (6.9)	4.4 (11)	22.7 (57.56)
Average precipitation days (≥ 0.01 in)	2.5	2.9	3.7	6.2	10.3	7.5	7.7	7.7	5.0	4.6	3.0	2.9	64.0
Average snowy days (≥ 0.1 in)	2.0	2.3	1.9	0.9	0.2	0.0	0.0	0.0	0.0	0.6	1.1	2.6	11.6
Source 1: NOAA
Source 2: National Weather Service

== Demographics ==
Historical population
Census	Pop.	Note	%±
1890	488		—
1900	634		29.9%
1910	2,800		341.6%
1920	3,818		36.4%
1930	4,423		15.8%
1940	4,884		10.4%
1950	5,315		8.8%
1960	7,379		38.8%
1970	7,594		2.9%
1980	8,768		15.5%
1990	9,068		3.4%
2000	11,034		21.7%
2010	11,315		2.5%
2020	11,597		2.5%
U.S. Decennial Census

=== 2020 census ===
As of the 2020 census, Fort Morgan had a population of 11,597. The median age was 32.6 years. 28.5% of residents were under the age of 18 and 14.2% of residents were 65 years of age or older. For every 100 females there were 99.9 males, and for every 100 females age 18 and over there were 97.9 males age 18 and over.

99.6% of residents lived in urban areas, while 0.4% lived in rural areas.

There were 4,057 households in Fort Morgan, of which 37.8% had children under the age of 18 living in them. Of all households, 46.6% were married-couple households, 19.4% were households with a male householder and no spouse or partner present, and 28.4% were households with a female householder and no spouse or partner present. About 27.7% of all households were made up of individuals and 12.9% had someone living alone who was 65 years of age or older.

There were 4,293 housing units, of which 5.5% were vacant. The homeowner vacancy rate was 1.4% and the rental vacancy rate was 6.3%.

Racial composition as of the 2020 census
Race	Number	Percent
White	6,122	52.8%
Black or African American	821	7.1%
American Indian and Alaska Native	190	1.6%
Asian	74	0.6%
Native Hawaiian and Other Pacific Islander	4	0.0%
Some other race	2,410	20.8%
Two or more races	1,976	17.0%
Hispanic or Latino (of any race)	5,588	48.2%

=== 2000 census ===
As of the 2000 census, 11,034 people, 3,887 households, and 2,736 families resided in the city. The population density was 2,472.1 inhabitants per square mile (954.5/km^{2}). The 4,094 housing units averaged 917.2 per square mile (354.4/km^{2}). The racial makeup of the city was 74.43% White, 0.28% African American, 1.01% Native American, 0.18% Asian, 0.24% Pacific Islander, 20.62% from other races, and 3.24% from two or more races. Hispanics or Latinos of any race were 39.04% of the population.

Of the 3,887 households, 37.5% had children under the age of 18 living with them, 54.6% were married couples living together, 10.9% had a female householder with no husband present, an unknown percentage had a male householder with no wife present, and 29.6% were not families. About 25.6% of all households were made up of individuals, and 12.6% had someone living alone who was 65 years of age or older. The average household size was 2.79 and the average family size was 3.32.

In the city, the population was distributed as 30.2% under the age of 18, 9.6% from 18 to 24, 29.1% from 25 to 44, 18.1% from 45 to 64, and 13.1% who were 65 years of age or older. The median age was 32 years. For every 100 females, there were 100.4 males. For every 100 females age 18 and over, there were 97.6 males.

The median income for a household in the city was $33,128, and for a family was $36,134. Males had a median income of $27,667 versus $22,346 for females. The per capita income for the city was $15,024. About 8.9% of families and 12.9% of the population were below the poverty line, including 16.5% of those under age 18 and 8.6% of those age 65 or over.

== Economy ==
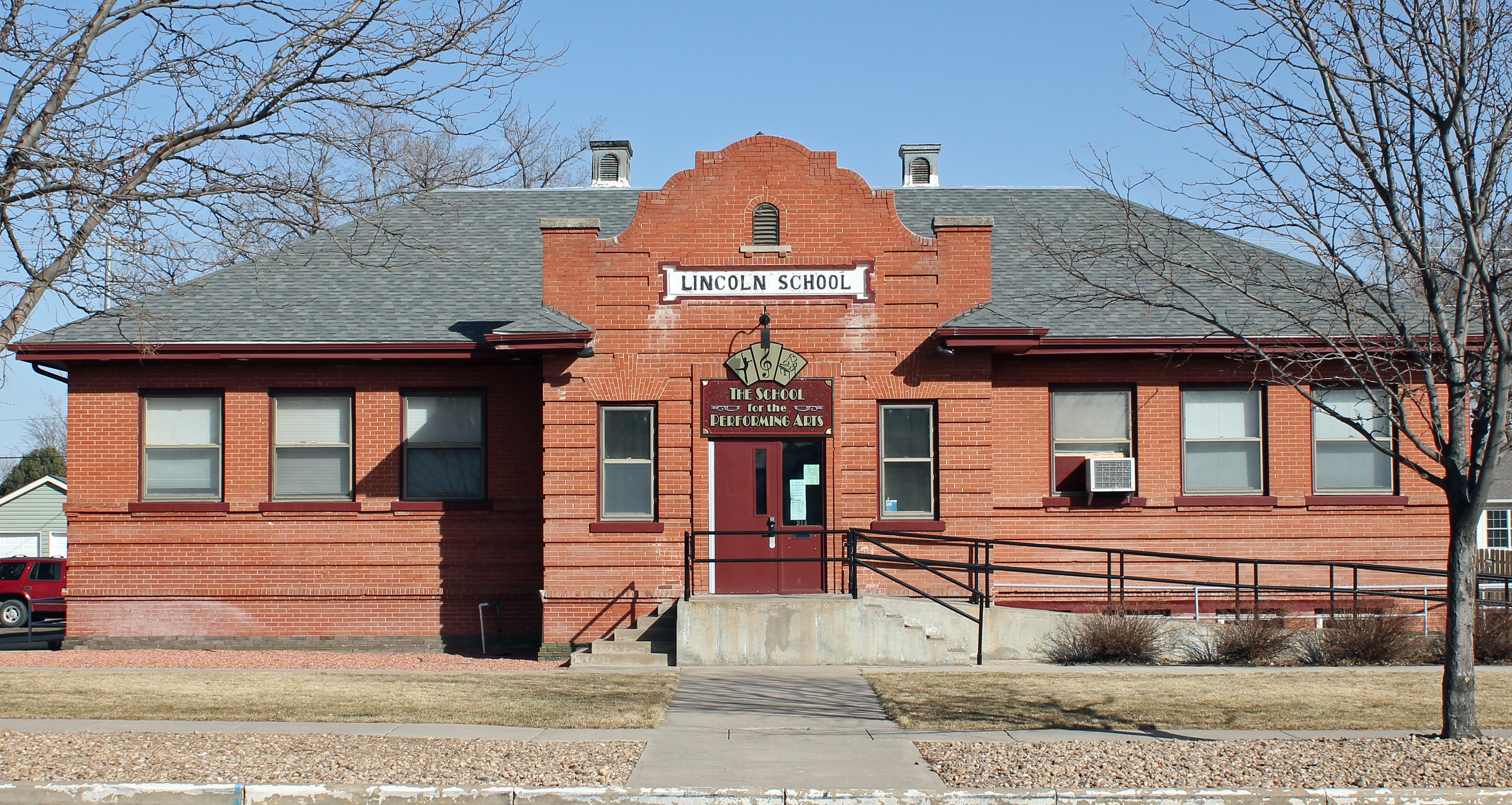
Lincoln School is listed on the National Register of Historic Places and is the location of the School for the Performing Arts.

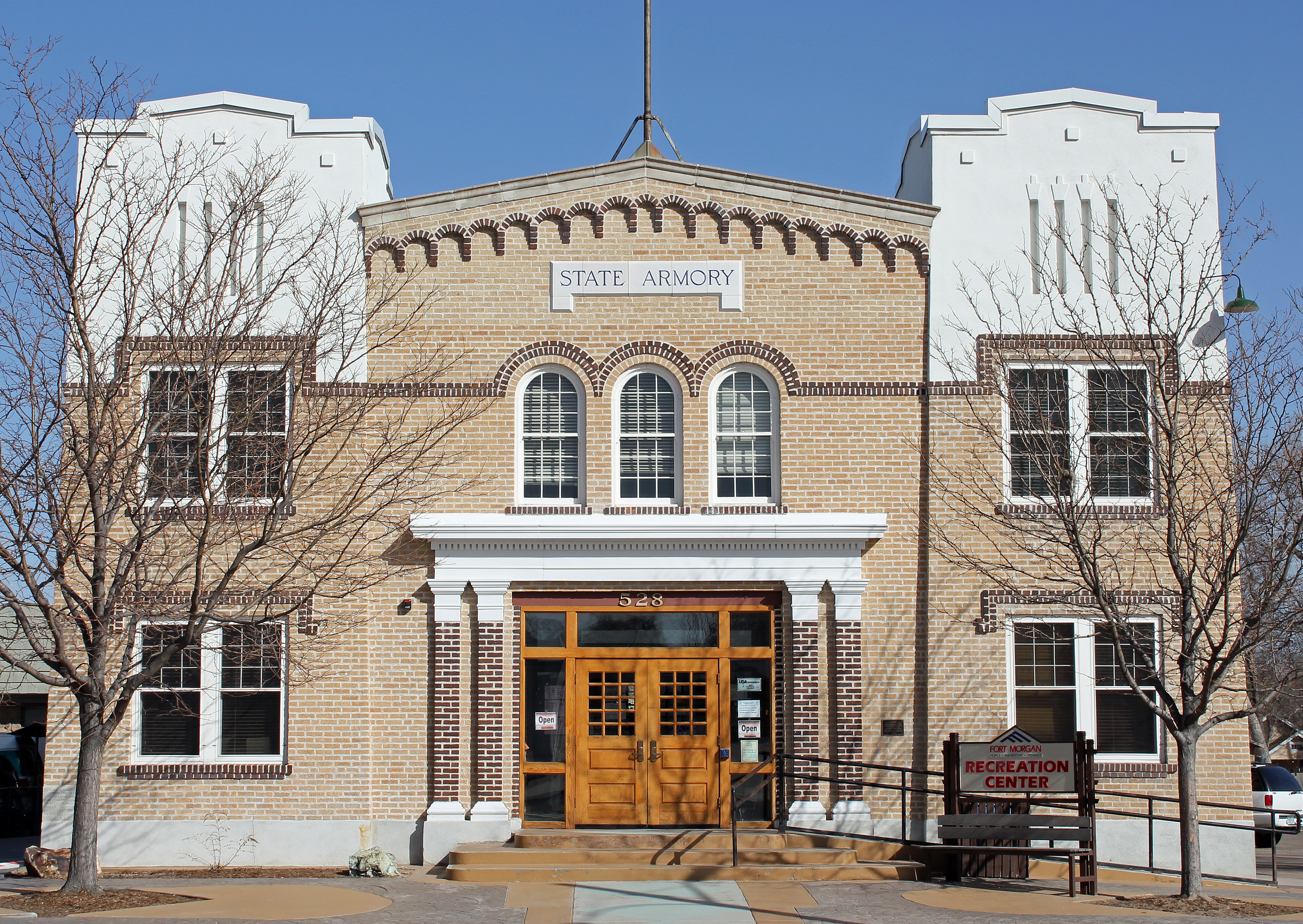
Fort Morgan State Armory is used as a town recreation center.

Fort Morgan is home primarily to an agricultural economy.

Cargill operates a meatpacking plant. As of 2016, many of the employees at the plant were Muslims, many from Somalia.

Western Sugar operates their main plant in Fort Morgan.

== Education ==
Fort Morgan is served by Fort Morgan School District RE-3. The district serves over 3,400 students across 8 schools:

- Sherman Early Childhood Center
- Baker Elementary School
- Columbine Elementary School
- Green Acres Elementary School
- Pioneer Elementary School
- Fort Morgan Middle School
- Fort Morgan High School

Fort Morgan is also home to Morgan Community College. In fall 2024, MCC enrolled 1,626 students.

== Media ==
=== Newspaper ===
The city newspaper is the Fort Morgan Times.

=== Radio ===
- KSIR 1010 AM and KRFD (FM) 94.5 have a broadcasting building in Fort Morgan.
- KFTM ("Hometown Radio") 1400 is a short-range AM radio station broadcasting in the city.
- BOB FM 97.5 KSRX is a music station from Sterling and Fort Morgan.

== Infrastructure ==
=== Transportation ===
==== Rail ====
Amtrak, the national passenger rail system, provides service through Fort Morgan, operating its California Zephyr daily in both directions between Chicago and Emeryville, California, across the bay from San Francisco.

==== Air ====
Although the town is served by Fort Morgan Municipal Airport, no scheduled airlines operate from there, and the airport is purely for general aviation. Denver International Airport is 76 miles (122 km) southwest and is the closest airport to provide scheduled services.

==== Major highways ====
- Interstate 76
- Business Loop 76
- U.S. Highway 6
- U.S. Highway 34
- State Highway 52
- State Highway 144

== Notable people ==
• Only people who already have a Wikipedia article may appear here. This establishes notability.

- Sam Brunelli - football player.
- Michael Crichton - lived in Fort Morgan for a short time during World War II.
- Elvin Drake - coach for the 1956 NCAA Champion UCLA Bruins.
- Joel Dreessen - former tight end for the Denver Broncos, grew up in Fort Morgan.
- Ryan Jensen - center for the 2021 Super Bowl Champion Tampa Bay Buccaneers
- Trey McBride - American Football Tight End
- Brenton Metzler - TV producer.
- Glenn Miller (1904–1944) - Big Band musician
- Robert Whitehead (1916–2007) - businessman - born in Fort Morgan.

== See also ==
- Fort Morgan, CO Micropolitan Statistical Area
