= Canadian River (North Platte River tributary) =

River in Colorado, United States

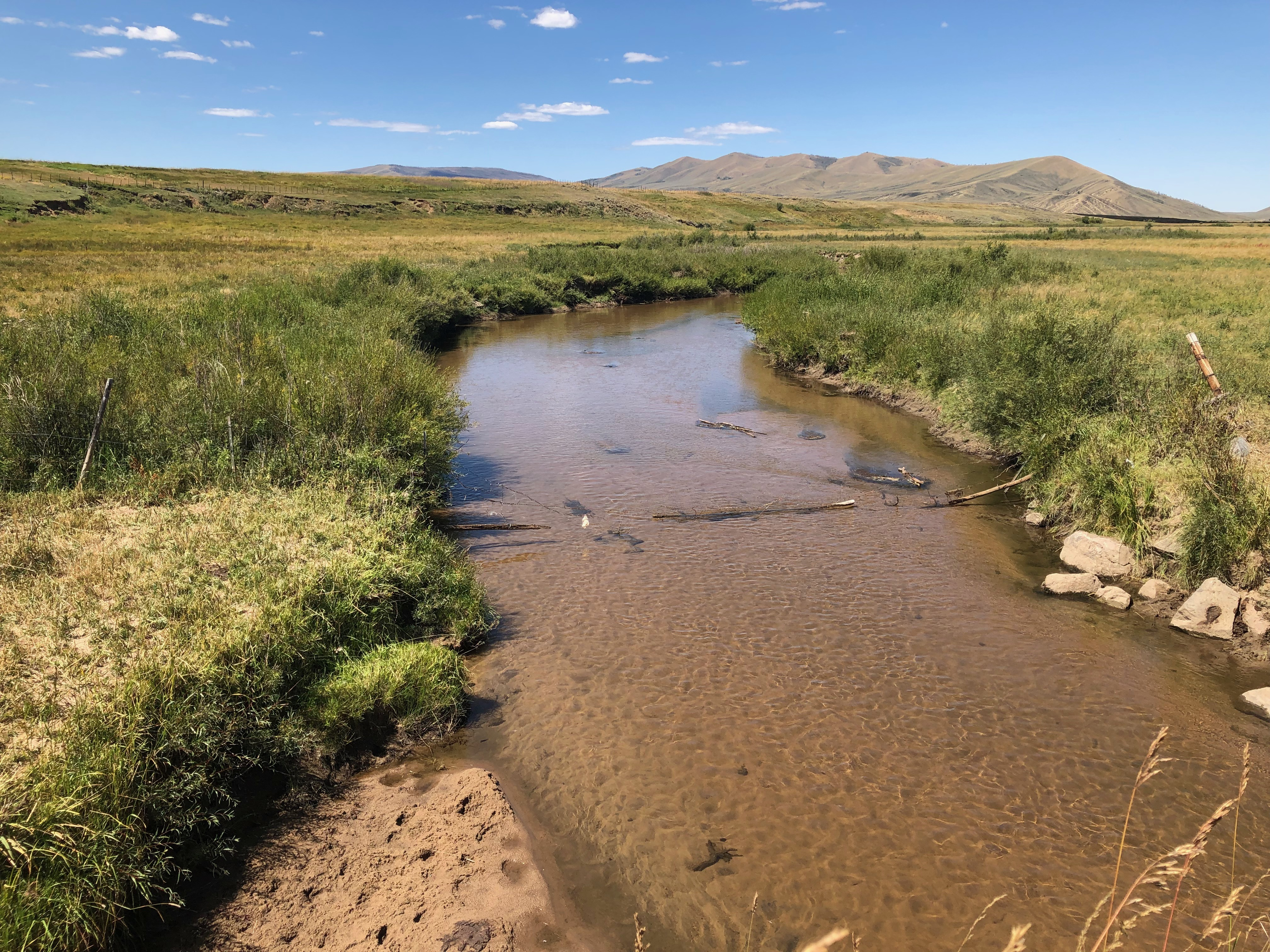

Physical characteristics
- Source
  - location: Confluence of North Fork and South Fork
  - coordinates: 40°36′56″N 106°01′14″W
- Mouth
  - location: Confluence with North Platte
  - coordinates: 40°53′28″N 106°19′39″W
  - elevation: 7,851 ft (2,393 m)
- Length: 55 mi (89 km)

Basin features
- Progression: North Platte—Platte— Missouri—Mississippi

The Canadian River is a tributary of the North Platte River, approximately 55 miles (89 km) long, located in Jackson County in north central Colorado in the United States. It drains the eastern edge of the North Park basin along the western side of Medicine Bow Mountains.

It rises in several short forks that descend from the southwest edge of the Medicine Bow Mountains near Clark Peak in southeastern Jackson County, north of Gould and northwest of Cameron Pass. It descends to the northwest through the Colorado State Forest, and in the valley floor, where it becomes a braided stream as it passes through ranch country. It roughly skirts the eastern edge of the valley, roughly parallel to the Michigan River to the west. It joins the North Platte from the east in north central Jackson County, approximately 7 mi (12 km) north of Walden and approximately 2 mi (3 km) downstream from the mouth of the Michigan.

== See also ==
- List of rivers of Colorado
