= Willow Creek Pass (Colorado) =

Mountain pass in Colorado, USA

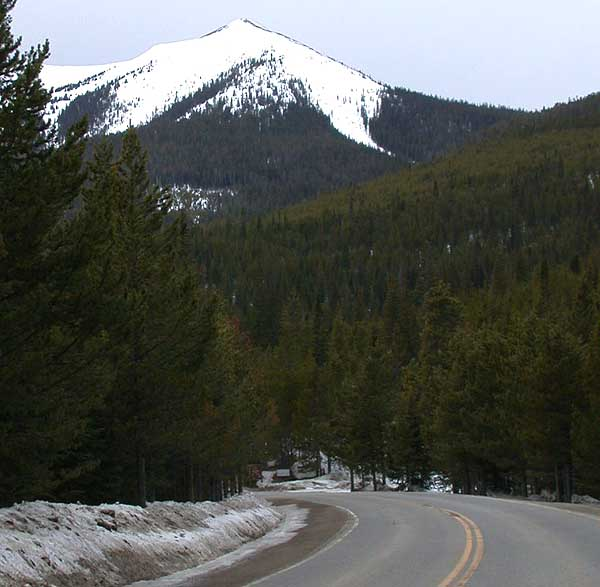
- South side of Willow Creek Pass

- Location within Colorado
- Elevation: 9,683 ft (2,951 m)
- Traversed by: State Highway 125

Third Approach
- Location: Grand / Jackson counties, Colorado, United States
- Range: Rabbit Ears Range
- Coordinates: 40°21′02″N 106°05′32″W
- Topo map: USGS Radial Mountain

Willow Creek Pass, elevation 9,683 ft (2,951 m), is a mountain pass that crosses the Continental Divide in the Rocky Mountains of north central Colorado.

== Overview ==
The pass encompasses the continental divide in the Rabbit Ears Range along the border between Jackson County (to the north) and Grand County (to the south). North of the pass, the Illinois River descends into North Park in the basin of the North Platte River. South of the pass, Willow Creek, for which the pass is named, descends southward to join the Colorado River near the town of Granby in Middle Park.

The pass is not an especially high one along the continental divide in Colorado, since the mountains separating North Park and Middle Park are relative low compared to nearby ranges. The approach from either side is mild and the pass is rarely closed in winter. The vicinity of the pass is sparsely populated, with no major communities in the vicinity. The pass is traversed by State Highway 125. The nearest commercial facilities are in the unincorporated community of Rand in Jackson County just north of the pass.

== Climate ==
Willow Creek Pass has a subarctic climate (Köppen Dfc).

Climate data for Willow Creek Pass, Colorado, 1991–2020 normals: 9540ft (2908m)
Month	Jan	Feb	Mar	Apr	May	Jun	Jul	Aug	Sep	Oct	Nov	Dec	Year
Mean daily maximum °F (°C)	28.2 (−2.1)	30.2 (−1.0)	37.9 (3.3)	44.4 (6.9)	54.1 (12.3)	64.9 (18.3)	69.8 (21.0)	67.3 (19.6)	60.3 (15.7)	47.4 (8.6)	35.2 (1.8)	27.3 (−2.6)	47.3 (8.5)
Daily mean °F (°C)	15.2 (−9.3)	17.1 (−8.3)	24.2 (−4.3)	31.2 (−0.4)	40.2 (4.6)	48.5 (9.2)	53.7 (12.1)	51.9 (11.1)	45.3 (7.4)	34.4 (1.3)	23.0 (−5.0)	14.9 (−9.5)	33.3 (0.7)
Mean daily minimum °F (°C)	2.3 (−16.5)	3.8 (−15.7)	10.1 (−12.2)	17.9 (−7.8)	26.2 (−3.2)	32.1 (0.1)	37.5 (3.1)	36.3 (2.4)	30.2 (−1.0)	21.3 (−5.9)	10.6 (−11.9)	2.6 (−16.3)	19.2 (−7.1)
Average precipitation inches (mm)	2.02 (51)	2.13 (54)	2.34 (59)	3.18 (81)	2.70 (69)	1.74 (44)	1.61 (41)	1.69 (43)	1.85 (47)	2.21 (56)	2.16 (55)	2.11 (54)	25.74 (654)
Source 1: XMACIS2
Source 2: NOAA (Precipitation)
