= Cache la Poudre-North Park Scenic Byway =

Colorado Scenic and Historic Byway

Coordinates: 40.5208°N 105.8925°W

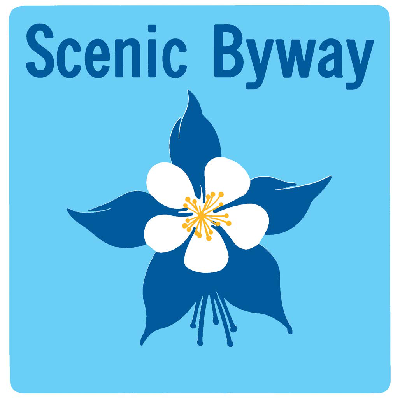
Cache la Poudre-North Park Scenic Byway

Route information
- Maintained by CDOT
- Length: 101 mi (163 km)
- Existed: 1991–present

Major junctions
- East end: US 287 / SH 14 Fort Collins
- West end: SH 14 / SH 125 Walden

Location
- Country: United States
- State: Colorado
- Counties: Jackson and Larimer counties

Highway system
- Scenic Byways; National; National Forest; BLM; NPS; Colorado State Highway System; Interstate; US; State; Scenic

The Cache la Poudre-North Park Scenic Byway is a 101-mile (163 km) National Forest Scenic Byway and Colorado Scenic and Historic Byway located in Jackson and Larimer counties, Colorado, US.

== See also ==
- History Colorado
- List of scenic byways in Colorado
- Scenic byways in the United States
