= Illinois River (Colorado) =

Tributary of the Michigan River

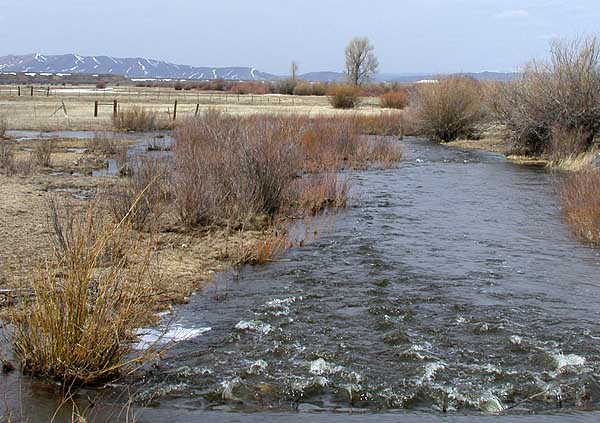
- Illinois River in April from SH 14 south of Walden

Physical characteristics
- Source
  - location: Never Summer Mountains
- Mouth
  - location: Confluence with Michigan
  - coordinates: 40°45′08″N 106°18′11″W
  - elevation: 8,022 ft (2,445 m)

Basin features
- Progression: Michigan → North Platte → Platte → Missouri → Mississippi

Illinois River is a tributary of the Michigan River, approximately 71 miles (114 km) long, in Jackson County in north central Colorado. It drains part of the North Park basin south of Walden.

The Illinois River starts in the Never Summer Mountains near the continental divide, just south of Farview Mountain. It descends northward through a winding gorge, emerging into North Park at approximately 8,000 feet (2,400 m) above sea level. It flows northward through the valley as a winding stream, past Rand. It passes under State Highway 14 just southeast of Walden and joins the Michigan from the north just north of Walden. A portion of the valley of the river south of Walden is located within the Arapaho National Wildlife Refuge.

== See also ==
- List of rivers of Colorado
