= Colorado State Highway 127 =

State highway in Colorado, United States

State Highway 127
- SH 127 highlighted in red

Route information
- Maintained by CDOT
- Length: 9.2 mi (14.8 km)

Major junctions
- South end: SH 125 north of Cowdrey
- North end: WYO 230 at the Wyoming state line in Mountain Home, WY

Location
- Country: United States
- State: Colorado
- Counties: Jackson

Highway system
- Colorado State Highway System; Interstate; US; State; Scenic
← SH 125	→ SH 128

State Highway 127 (SH 127) is a 9.202-mile-long (14.809 km) state highway in far northern Colorado.

== Route description ==
SH 127 begins in the south at its junction with SH 125 roughly four miles north of Cowdrey and proceeds generally northeast to the Wyoming state line where it becomes Wyoming Highway 230 towards Laramie, WY.

== Major intersections ==
The entire route is in Jackson County.

Location	mi	km	Destinations	Notes
	0.000	0.000	SH 125 – Walden, Saratoga	Southern terminus
	9.202	14.809	WYO 230 – Laramie	Continuation beyond Wyoming state line
1.000 mi = 1.609 km; 1.000 km = 0.621 mi

== See also ==
- List of state highways in Colorado
