= Colorado State Highway 125 =

State highway in Colorado, United States

State Highway 125
- SH 125 highlighted in red

Route information
- Maintained by CDOT
- Length: 75.41 mi (121.36 km)

Major junctions
- South end: US 40 west of Granby
- SH 14 near and in Walden; SH 127 north of Cowdrey
- North end: WYO 230 at the Wyoming border

Location
- Country: United States
- State: Colorado
- Counties: Grand, Jackson

Highway system
- Colorado State Highway System; Interstate; US; State; Scenic
← SH 121	→ SH 127

State Highway 125 (SH 125) is a state highway in the U.S. state of Colorado. The highway runs north–south through Jackson and Grand counties in north central Colorado. It furnishes the principal north–south link through North Park and a connection to Middle Park over Willow Creek Pass. It is two-lane along its entire route. SH 125's southern terminus is at U.S. Route 40 (US 40) west of Granby, and the northern terminus is at Wyoming Highway 230 (WYO 230) at the Wyoming border.

== Route description ==
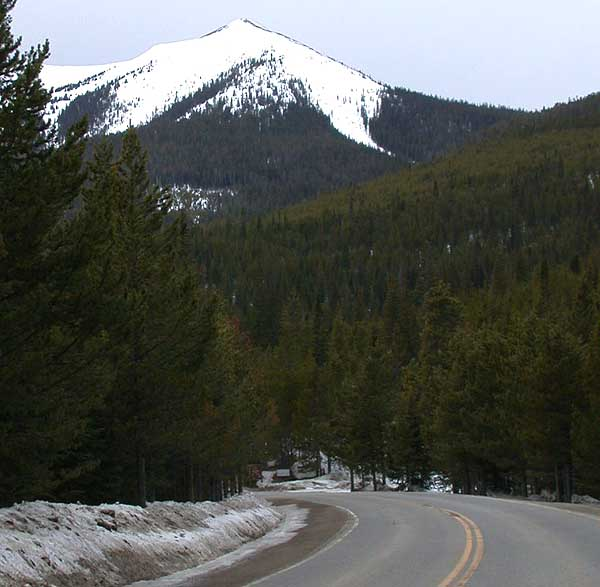
SH 125 at Willow Creek Pass in north central Colorado, looking toward Parkview Mountain

At the northern end, the highway begins at the Wyoming state line, where it is contiguous with Wyoming Highway 230. It follows the North Platte River and Michigan River southward through Cowdrey and Walden, the county seat of Jackson County and the largest community along the road. At Walden it intersects State Highway 14. South of Walden, it crosses the southern end of North Park along the valley of the Illinois River, a tributary of the Michigan. It passes the unincorporated community of Rand, then ascends into the mountains and crosses the continental divide at Willow Creek Pass (elevation 9621 ft), one of the lowest crossings of the continental divide in Colorado. On the south side of the pass it descends the sparsely populated valley of Willow Creek into Middle Park. It terminates at its southern end at U.S. Highway 40 two miles (3.2 km) west of Granby.

== Major intersections ==
County	Location	mi	km	Destinations	Notes
Grand		0.000	0.000	US 40 – Granby, Hot Sulphur Springs	Southern terminus
Jackson		52.020	83.718	SH 14 – Steamboat Springs	South end of SH 14 overlap
Jackson	Walden	53.288	85.759	SH 14 (Sixth Street)	North end of SH 14 overlap
Jackson		66.558	107.115	SH 127 north – Laramie	Southern terminus of SH 127
Jackson		75.406	121.354	WYO 230 – Saratoga	Continuation beyond Wyoming state line; Northern terminus
1.000 mi = 1.609 km; 1.000 km = 0.621 mi: Concurrency terminus

== See also ==
- List of state highways in Colorado
