= Wyoming Highway 230 =

State highway in Wyoming, United States

Wyoming Highway 230
- Rivers Road
- WYO 230 highlighted in red

Route information
- Maintained by WYDOT

Western segment
- Length: 37.17 mi (59.82 km)
- West end: WYO 130
- Major intersections: WYO 70 in Riverside
- East end: SH 125 at the Colorado state line

Eastern segment
- Length: 41.96 mi (67.53 km)
- West end: SH 127 at the Colorado state line in Mountain Home
- Major intersections: I-80 in Laramie
- East end: I-80 BL / US 30 / US 287 in Laramie

Location
- Country: United States
- State: Wyoming
- Counties: Albany, Carbon

Highway system
- Wyoming State Highway System; Interstate; US; State
← WYO 226	→ WYO 231

Wyoming Highway 230 (WYO 230) is a 78.74-mile-long (126.72 km) state highway in the U.S. state of Wyoming. It is known locally as Rivers Road and travels from WYO 130 approximately eight miles (13 km) south of Saratoga south from there to intersect WYO 70 in Riverside and then heads southeast to the Colorado-Wyoming state line. The highway continues southeast in Colorado as State Highway 125 (SH 125), then it turns northeast as SH 127. At the Wyoming-Colorado state line, WYO 230 resumes. WYO 230 then heads northeast towards Laramie to end at Business Loop I-80/U.S. Route 30/U.S. Route 287 (I-80 BL/US 30 /US 287) in Laramie. WYO 230 provides a scenic and less-traveled alternative for travelers who want to avoid I-80 and US 30 but cannot take WYO 130 which is closed in the winter.

== Route description ==
WYO 230 basically crosses the same type of terrain as WYO 130. The part of WYO 230 from WYO 130, south of Saratoga and the Wyoming-Colorado state line slowly climbs out of the Platte Valley to a height of over 8,000 feet (2,400 m). At 10 miles (16 km) there is a junction with WYO 70 in the community of Riverside where WYO 70 heads west to Baggs and WYO 230 turns southeast towards the state line. At the state line, WYO 230 ends briefly and the roadway continues southeast into Colorado as SH 125. 9 miles (14 km) into Colorado there is a junction with SH 127 north of Cowdrey, Colorado. SH 127 heads northeast approximately nine miles (14 km) back into Wyoming where that state highway ends and WYO 230 resumes. From there WYO 230 climbs again into the southeastern edge of the Snowy Range Mountains through mostly forested areas. At 51.8 miles (83.4 km) there is a junction with WYO 10 in Woods Landing. Further east along WYO 230, it the highway descends into the Laramie Basin. WYO 230 meets WYO 130 just west of Laramie, and the two highways run concurrency into Laramie as Snowy Range Road. (This is the only instance in Wyoming where two state routes are merged). There is an interchange with Interstate 80 (I-80; exit 311) at 77.7 miles (125.0 km), and WYO 230 ends at 78.74 miles (126.72 km) at I-80 Bus./US 30/US 287 (3rd Street).

== Major intersections ==
Mileposts for the western segment run west-to-east; for the eastern segment, mileposts run east-to-west.

County	Location	mi	km	Destinations	Notes
Carbon		0.00	0.00	WYO 130	Western terminus; highway continues as WYO 130 west
Carbon	Riverside	9.11	14.66	WYO 70 west – Encampment	
Wyoming–Colorado line		37.17	59.82	SH 125 south	Continues 8.4 miles (13.5 km) to SH 127 north
Gap in route
Colorado–Wyoming line		41.96	67.53	SH 127 south	Continues 9.2 miles (14.8 km) to SH 125
Albany	Woods Landing-Jelm	27.26	43.87	WYO 10 – Woods Landing, Jelm	
Albany	Laramie	2.12	3.41	WYO 130 – Centennial, Snowy Range Ski Area	Western end of concurrency with WYO 130
Albany	Laramie	1.32	2.12	I-80 – Rawlins, Cheyenne	Exit 311 on I-80
Albany	Laramie	0.00	0.00	WYO 130 ends US 287 / US 30 / I-80 BL (3rd Street)	Eastern termini of WYO 230 and WYO 130; eastern end of WYO 130 concurrency
1.000 mi = 1.609 km; 1.000 km = 0.621 mi: Concurrency terminus
