= Wyoming Highway 70 =

State highway in Wyoming, United States

Wyoming Highway 70
- WYO 70 highlighted in red

Route information
- Maintained by WYDOT
- Length: 57.66 mi (92.79 km)
- Restrictions: closed in winter over Battle Pass in the Sierra Madre

Major junctions
- West end: WYO 789 in Baggs
- East end: WYO 230 in Riverside

Location
- Country: United States
- State: Wyoming
- Counties: Carbon, Moffat (CO)

Highway system
- Wyoming State Highway System; Interstate; US; State
← WYO 59	→ WYO 71

Wyoming Highway 70 (WYO 70) is a 57.66-mile-long (92.79 km) state highway in southern Wyoming. The route travels from an intersection with WYO 789 in Baggs eastward to WYO 230 in Riverside. WYO 70 over Battle Pass is closed during winter (November to April). The section of the route within Medicine Bow National Forest is designated the Battle Pass Scenic Byway.

== Route description ==
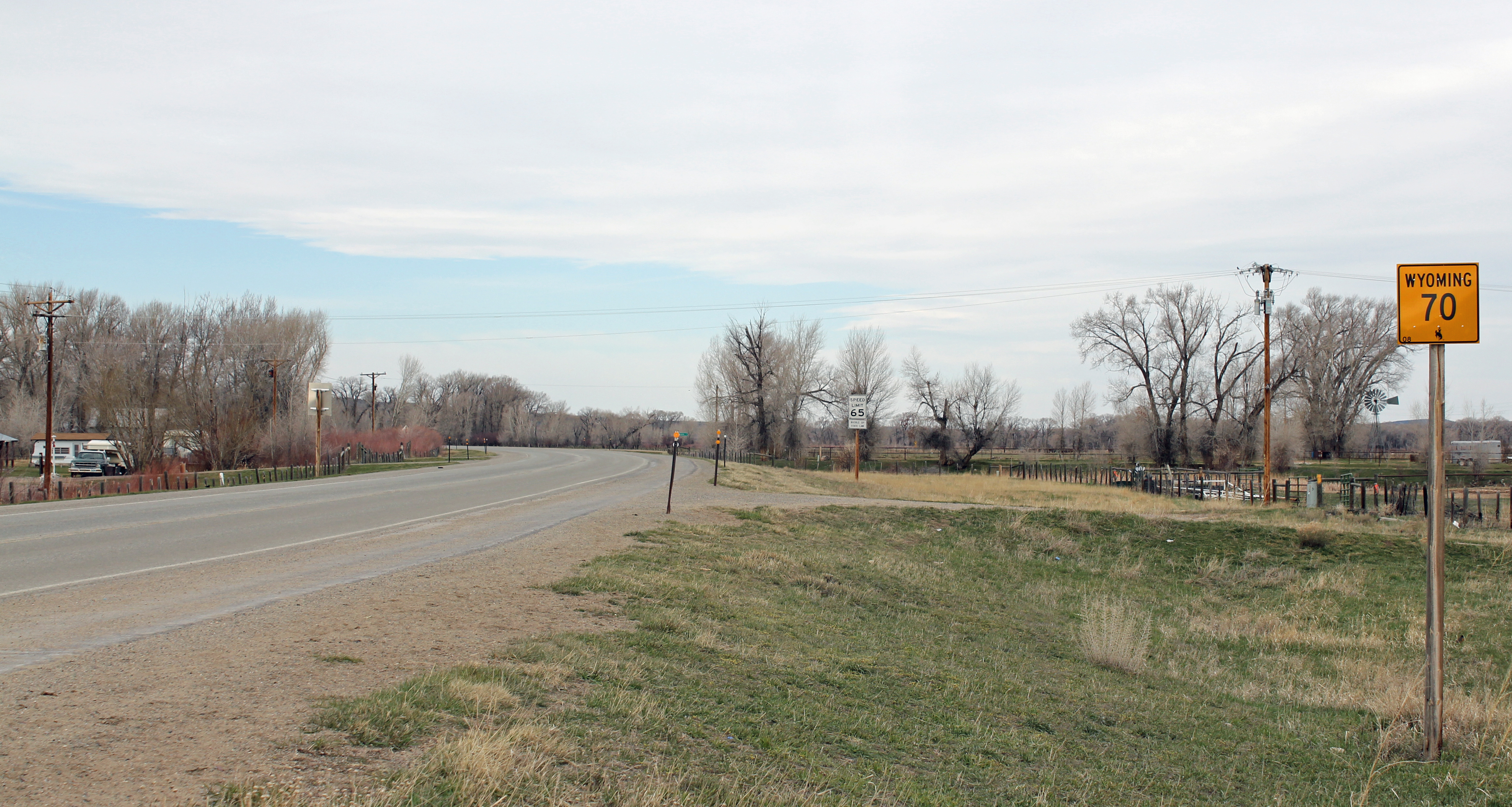
WYO 70 near Dixon, April 2014

Wyoming Highway 70 begins in Baggs at Wyoming Highway 789 and heads east through southern Carbon County near the Colorado state line. Highway 70 travels through the communities of Dixon and Savery before dipping across the state line, where a short section passes through Slater, Colorado (between mileposts 15.34 and 16.24). This short section through Moffat County, Colorado is not part of the Colorado State Highway System, and is maintained by the Wyoming Department of Transportation. At 16.7 miles, Wyoming 70 intersects with former Colorado State Highway 129, which used to connect US 40 with Wyoming 70. It is now Moffat CR 1. Thereafter the highway travels through very scenic Medicine Bow National Forest (between mileposts 21.25 and 51.10) and passes over Battle Pass at an elevation of 9,955 feet (3,034 m). After leaving the national forest, Highway 70 passes through Encampment and then on to Riverside, where it ends at its junction with WYO 230.

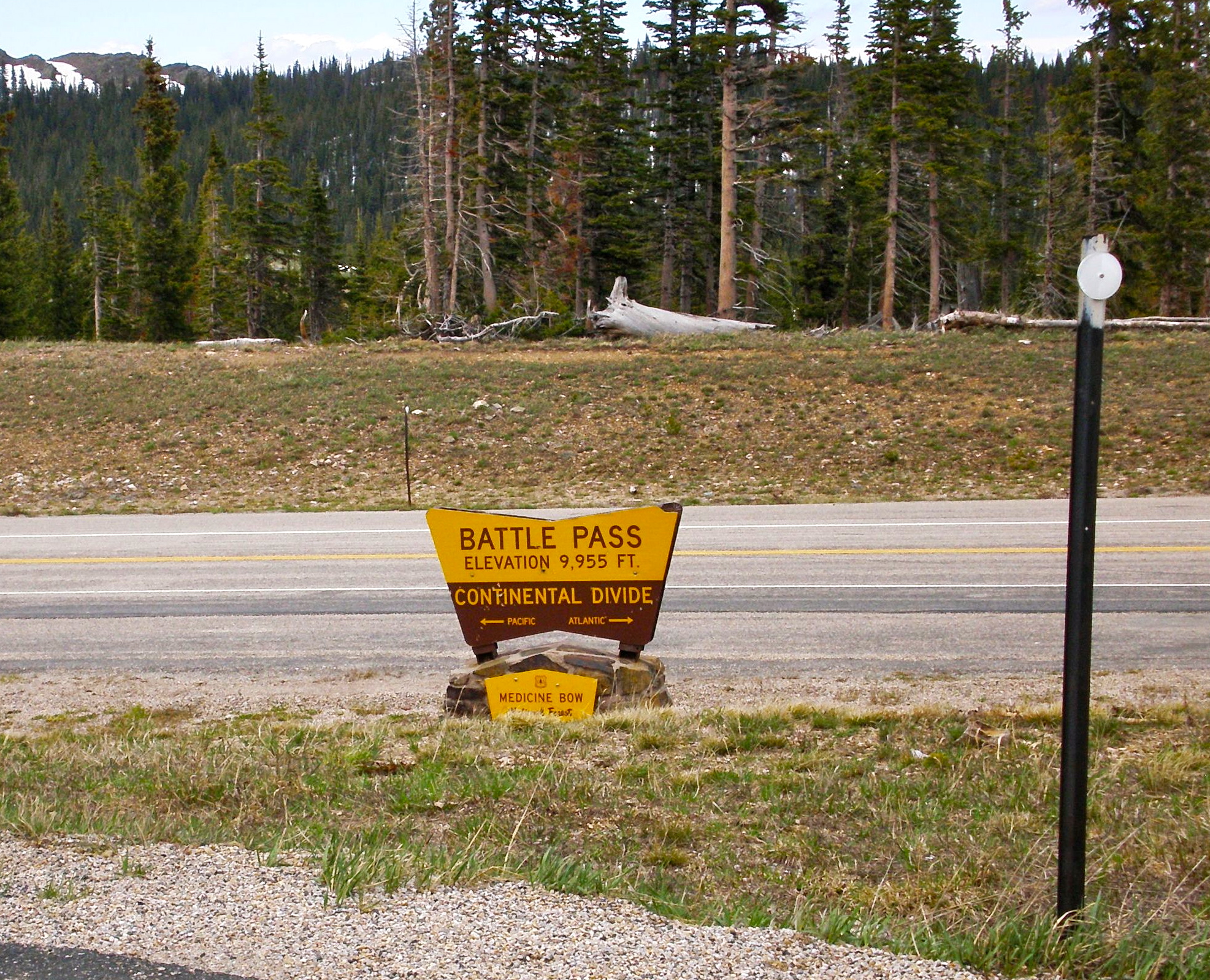
The Continental Divide at Battle Pass, June 2009

During the spring of 2011, a landslide occurred on WYO 70 near milepost 31, about halfway between Baggs and Encampment. The slide destroyed a 1,000-foot length of the highway, and the road was closed to through traffic for several weeks. As a result, a temporary one-lane detour was constructed. Reconstruction of the road where the slide occurred was ruled out after geologic investigations found the slide is likely to continue moving in the future. Work to realign WYO 70 around to the north of the slide area is being done. WYDOT anticipates the realignment project would require two construction seasons, during which time the existing detour would be maintained.

== History ==
Between the 1940s and 1960s, Wyoming Highway 70 connected with former Colorado State Highway 129, which used to connect US 40 with Wyoming 70. During the time Highway 129 existed, WY 70 didn't exist as it does now. Only the western part from SH 129 to Baggs was designated as Highway 70. Former Colorado State Highway 129 is now Routt County Route 129.

On November 15, 2012, The Wyoming Highway Commission designated Wyoming State Highway 70 as the Battle Pass Scenic Byway. A local support group, Battle Pass Scenic Byway Alliance, Inc. is a non-profit organization that is coordinating the interpretive signage along this unique roadway across the Continental Divide.

== Recreation ==
The Continental Divide Trail traverses Battle Pass. Resupply is available in the nearby Town of Encampment to the east. Local camping is available just north of the highway. In 2010 a small trailer was parked just off the highway on private property for the use of thru-hikers.

== Major intersections ==
State	County	Location	mi	km	Destinations	Notes
Wyoming	Carbon	Baggs	0.00	0.00	Howard St west	Continuation west from western terminus
Wyoming	Carbon	Baggs	0.00	0.00	WYO 789 north (Penland St) – Creston Junction, Rawlins WYO 789 south (Penland St) – Craig (Colorado), Meeker (Colorado), Rifle (Colorado)	Western terminus
Colorado	Moffat	No major junctions				
Wyoming	Carbon		32.9	52.9	Sage Creek Rd north – Rawlins	T intersection
Wyoming	Carbon	Stretch of road closed winters				
Wyoming	Carbon		50.0	80.5	Forest Service Rd 443 north	T intersection
Wyoming	Carbon	Riverside	57.66	92.79	WYO 230 east – Colorado state line, Walden (Colorado)	Eastern terminus; T intersection
Wyoming	Carbon	Riverside	57.66	92.79	WYO 230 west – Saratoga, Rawlins, Laramie	Continuation north from eastern terminus
1.000 mi = 1.609 km; 1.000 km = 0.621 mi

== See also ==
- List of state highways in Wyoming
