= Arapaho National Wildlife Refuge =

Wildlife refuge in north-central Colorado, US

- IUCN category IV (habitat/species management area)
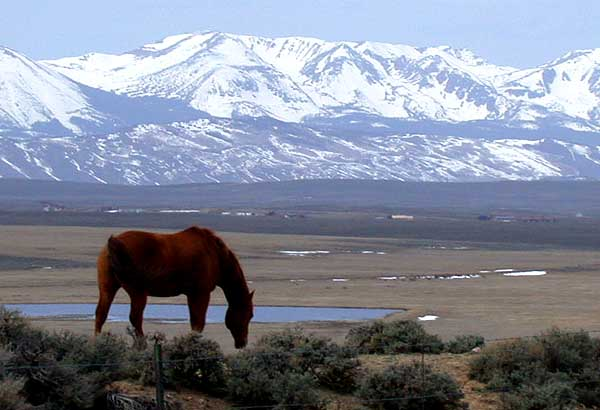
- View of the Arapaho National Wildlife Refuge, looking out over the valley of the Illinois River from State Highway 14. The Park Range is in the background.

- Location within the United States
- Location: Jackson County, Colorado, United States
- Nearest city: Walden
- Coordinates: 40°37′23″N 106°16′28″W
- Area: 24,804 acres (100.38 km^{2})
- Established: 1967
- Governing body: U.S. Fish and Wildlife Service
- Website: Arapaho National Wildlife Refuge

The Arapaho National Wildlife Refuge is a United States National Wildlife Refuge located in north-central Colorado. It is one of over 560 national wildlife refuges which manages and protects natural resources for future generations. The refuge is located in North Park in central Jackson County south of the town of Walden. The refuge was established in 1967 to furnish waterfowl with a suitable place to nest and rear their young. It was created in part to offset losses of nesting habitat in the prairie wetland region of the Midwest. It is located in the valley of the Illinois River, a tributary of the North Platte River. It is administered by the United States Fish and Wildlife Service.

Mortenson Lake National Wildlife Refuge in Wyoming is administered by Arapaho National Wildlife Refuge

== Description ==
The dry climate of the area (at an elevation of approximately 8800 feet) requires the diversion of water from the Illinois River through a complex system of ditches to irrigate wetland meadows and fill water fowl brood ponds. Periodic burning, irrigation and various grazing systems are management tools used on the refuge meadows to maintain vegetative vigor for nesting purposes. Manipulation of water levels in the shallow ponds is intended to assure adequate aquatic vegetation for food and escape cover. The ponds also produce many insects and other invertebrates (protein) needed by most female waterfowl for successful egg laying. These insects also serve as an essential food item for the growth of ducklings and goslings during the summer months.

The first waterfowl arrive at the refuge in the spring when the ice vanishes in April. The peak migration occurs in late May when 5,000 or more ducks may be present. Canada geese have been reestablished in North Park and begin nesting on the refuge during April. Duck nesting usually starts in early June and peaks in late June. The refuge produces about 9,000 ducklings and 150 to 200 goslings each year. The Fish and Wildlife Service expects that when refuge lands are fully acquired and developed, waterfowl production should increase significantly.

There have been 198 bird species recorded in the refuge. Primary upland nesting species include the mallard, pintail, gadwall, and American wigeon. Several diving ducks, including the lesser scaup and redhead, nest on the larger ponds and adjacent wet meadows. Most species may be observed during the entire summer season. Fall migration reaches its height in late September or early October when up to 8,000 waterfowl may be on the refuge.

Refuge wetlands also attract numerous marsh, shore, and water birds. Sora and Virginia rails - shy, secretive birds - are numerous but seldom seen. If they are present, Wilson's phalarope, American avocet, willet, sandpipers, Greater yellowlegs, and dowitchers will be easy to observe. Other less common species include great blue heron, black-crowned night heron, American bittern, and eared and pied-billed grebe.

The upland hills harbor sage grouse year around with a winter population of more than 200 birds. Golden eagles, several species of hawks, and an occasional prairie falcon circle the skies above the refuge in search of food. Their prey includes Richardson's ground squirrel, white-tailed prairie dog, and white-tailed jackrabbit.

Badger, muskrat, beaver, coyote, and pronghorn are commonly observed by visitors. It is also possible to see the mammalian species of raccoon, red fox, mink, long-tailed weasel, or porcupine. As many as 400 mule deer have wintered here and up to 200 elk are frequently seen during the winter months. Moose have recently been reintroduced into North Park and may occasionally be observed in the willow thickets along the Illinois River bottoms. There are no venomous snakes in the refuge.

== Public access ==
Public access to the refuge includes a self-guided 6-mile wildlife auto tour route from nearby State Highway 14, and an overlook over the Illinois River valley. Public fishing is permitted along the Illinois River except in the areas marked as closed. Portions of the refuge are open to public hunting of some game species during appropriate state seasons. The refuge is open for day-use only and is closed during night time except for staff members. Fires are not permitted on refuge lands.

An 1850-foot ADA compliant boardwalk was completed in August 2009 by Wildlands Restoration Volunteers. The volunteers built it over 5 years, with more than 6,000 man hours of labor. It winds along with parts of the river where numerous animals and birds can be seen. Moose can often be seen among the willows. The boardwalk is about a mile southwest of the refuge headquarters.
