= Rabbit Ears Range =

Mountain range in Colorado, United States

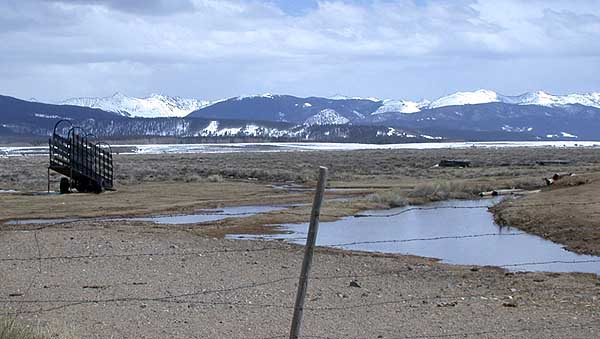
- Cattle ramp outside Rand, Colorado looking south from Jackson County Road 27, with Rabbit Ears Range in the background. (April 4, 2005)

Highest point
- Peak: Parkview Mountain
- Elevation: 12,301 ft (3,749 m)
- Listing: Mountain ranges of Colorado
- Coordinates: 40°19′49″N 106°08′11″W

Geography
- Location within Colorado
- Country: United States
- State: Colorado
- Counties: Jackson; Grand
- Range coordinates: 40°21.5′N 106°18.8′W
- Parent range: Rocky Mountains

The Rabbit Ears Range is a mountain range of the Rocky Mountains in north-central Colorado in the United States. The range stretches east–west along the continental divide, forming the border between Grand and Jackson counties, and separating Middle Park (south) from North Park (north).

The range's highest point is Parkview Mountain at approximately 12,300 feet (3,700 m), but most of the rest of the range is around 11,000 feet. It connects the Front Range on the east with the Park Range and the Gore Range on the west. It is traversable at Willow Creek Pass. Muddy Pass separates the Rabbit Ears Range to the east from the Park Range to the north. Rabbit Ears Pass and Rabbit Ears Peak, despite their names, are not in the Rabbit Ears Range, but actually part of the Park Range to the south.

== Highest peaks ==
- Parkview Mountain (12,301 ft)
- Sheep Mountain (11,819 ft)
- Elk Mountain (11,419 ft)
