= Stoneham, Colorado =

Unincorporated community in Weld County, CO, USA

- Unincorporated community
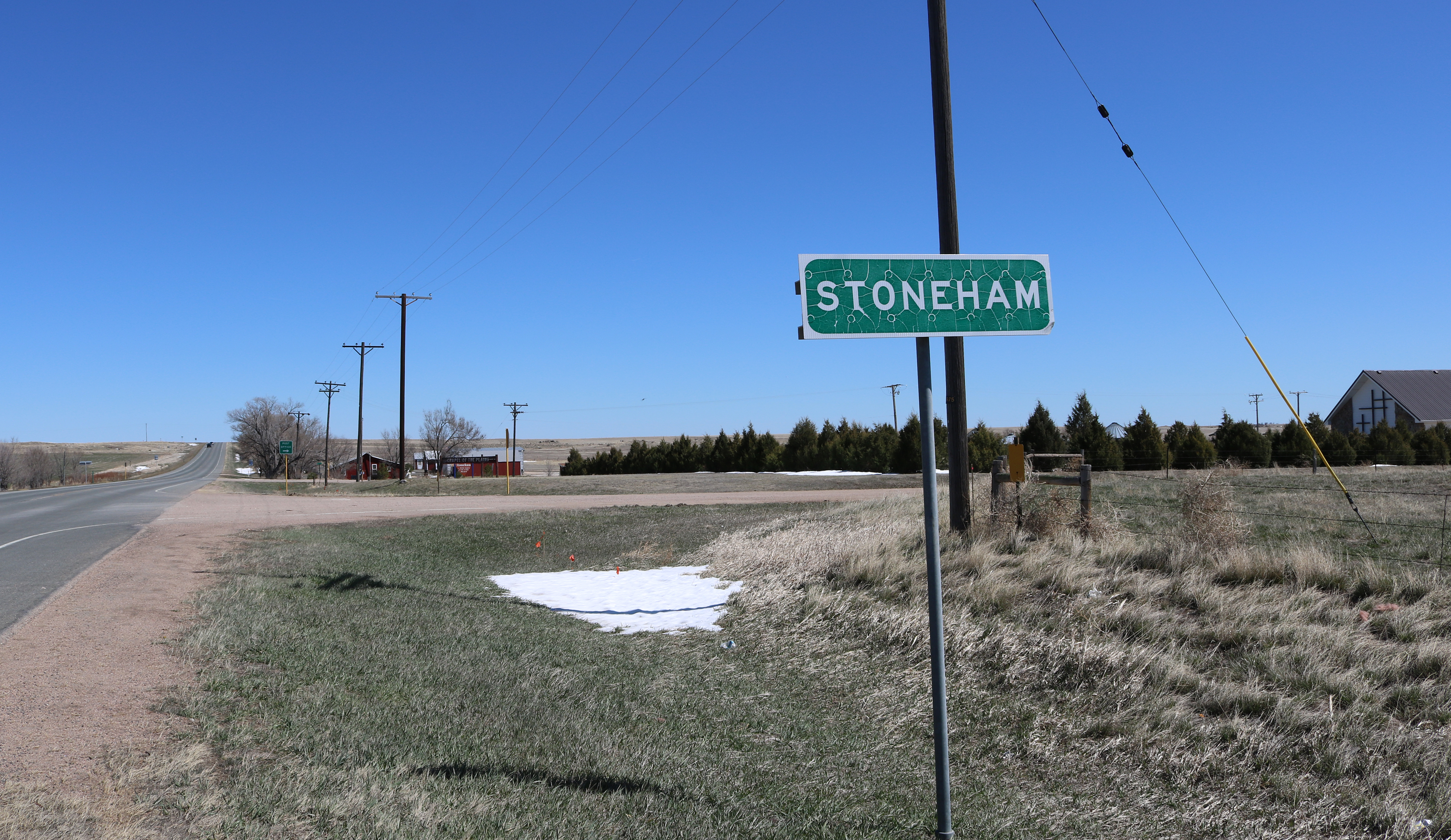
- A view of Stoneham and Colorado State Highway 14

- Location in Weld County and the state of Colorado Stoneham, Colorado (the United States)
- Coordinates: 40°36′20″N 103°40′00″W
- Country: United States
- State: Colorado
- County: Weld County
- Elevation: 4,584 ft (1,397 m)

Population (2020)
  - Total: 20
- Time zone: UTC-7 (MST)
  - Summer (DST): UTC-6 (MDT)
- ZIP code: 80754
- Area code: 970
- GNIS feature ID: 182781

Stoneham is an unincorporated community and a U.S. Post Office located in Weld County, Colorado, United States. The Stoneham Post Office has the ZIP Code 80754, and has been in operation since 1907.

Stoneham is approximately 24 miles west of Sterling, 24 miles north of Brush, 43 miles south of Kimball, and 56 miles northeast of Greeley.

== History ==
The Chicago, Burlington, and Quincy Railroad built a rail line from Holdrege to Cheyenne in 1887, passing through the future Stoneham. Stoneham was established in 1888, although a drought strained the town's resources, and forced the closure of the post office from 1892 to 1907.

During the days of CB&Q passenger service, Stoneham was served by the 159 and 160 trains between Sterling and Cheyenne. By train in 1951, Stoneham was 4 hours and 10 minutes away from Cheyenne on the 159 train, and 103 minutes away from Sterling on the 160 train. Passenger service to Stoneham was terminated in 1971 due to the creation of Amtrak, and the termination of many CB&Q passenger routes as a result.

The railway, now owned by the Burlington Northern, was abandoned and torn up by 1983, leaving Stoneham without any rail access.

== Geography ==
The community is located near the junction of SH 71, heading between La Junta and the Nebraska border, and SH 14, heading between Muddy Pass and Sterling.
