= Cameron Pass =

Mountain pass in Colorado, USA

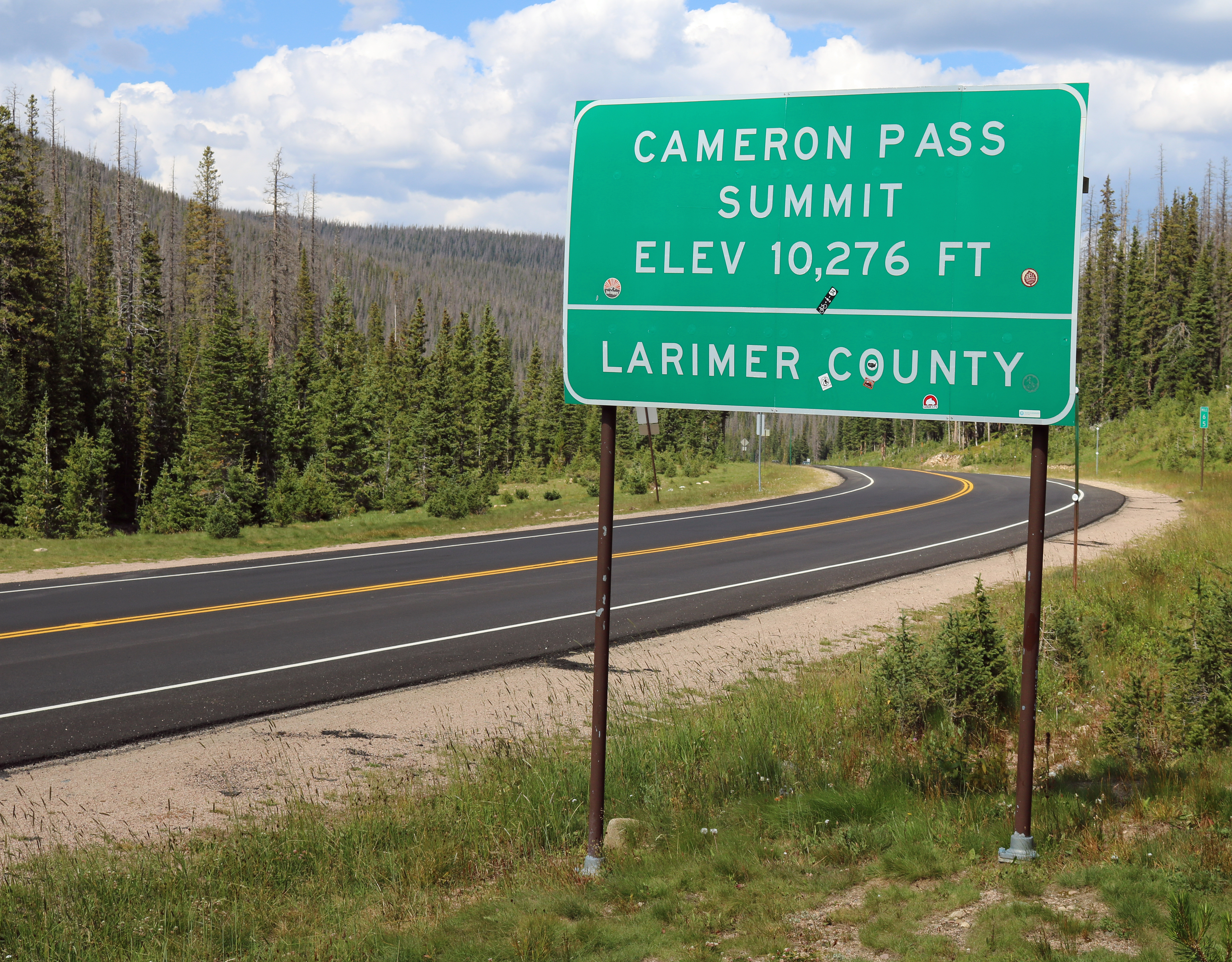
- One of the signs at the top of the pass.
- Interactive map of Cameron Pass
- Elevation: 10,276 feet (3,132 m)
- Traversed by: SH 14

Third Approach
- Location: Jackson / Larimer counties, Colorado, United States
- Range: Rocky Mountains
- Coordinates: 40°31′15″N 105°53′33″W
- Topo map: USGS Clark Peak

Cameron Pass (elevation 10,276 ft; 3,132 m) is a mountain pass in north-central Colorado in the Rocky Mountains of the western United States. The pass is a gap between the south end of the Medicine Bow Mountains and the north end of the Never Summer Mountains. It sits on the border between Jackson County and Larimer County, approximately 3 mi (5 km) north of the boundary of Rocky Mountain National Park. The pass provides the most convenient route between Fort Collins and Walden in North Park, using State Highway 14.

The pass was named for Robert Cameron, the founder of the Fort Collins Agricultural Colony and former Union general, in 1870. The pass was surveyed several times for railroads, including once by the Union Pacific Railroad as a possible route for a line through the Rockies. However, no railroad was ever built over the pass. The pass is located at the boundary of the Roosevelt National Forest and the Colorado State Forest State Park. Parking lots on the east and west sides of the pass, as well as at the summit allow access to nearby trails that are popular both for hiking in the summer and cross-country skiing in the winter. The pass receives much snow during the winter months and is prone to avalanches, but it usually remains open all-year round. The pass has a mild approach from the West where the road rises out of the broad North Park area, and is steep from the East where the road climbs from Fort Collins up the narrow Poudre River valley.

The pass is drained on the north side by a tributary of the Cache la Poudre River, Joe Wright Creek, in the basin of the South Platte River. It is drained on the south side by the Michigan River, a tributary of the North Platte River in North Park.

== Climate ==
The Joe Wright weather station is at the summit of Cameron Pass. Cameron Pass has a subarctic climate (Köppen Dfc).

Climate data for Joe Wright, Colorado, 1991–2020 normals: 10120ft (3085m)
Month	Jan	Feb	Mar	Apr	May	Jun	Jul	Aug	Sep	Oct	Nov	Dec	Year
Mean daily maximum °F (°C)	27.1 (−2.7)	29.1 (−1.6)	37.4 (3.0)	43.3 (6.3)	52.6 (11.4)	62.3 (16.8)	69.0 (20.6)	66.5 (19.2)	59.4 (15.2)	46.7 (8.2)	34.6 (1.4)	26.5 (−3.1)	46.2 (7.9)
Daily mean °F (°C)	18.6 (−7.4)	19.7 (−6.8)	26.7 (−2.9)	31.7 (−0.2)	40.2 (4.6)	48.3 (9.1)	54.3 (12.4)	52.6 (11.4)	46.7 (8.2)	36.3 (2.4)	25.9 (−3.4)	18.1 (−7.7)	34.9 (1.6)
Mean daily minimum °F (°C)	9.8 (−12.3)	10.2 (−12.1)	15.6 (−9.1)	20.2 (−6.6)	27.7 (−2.4)	34.3 (1.3)	39.6 (4.2)	38.7 (3.7)	34.0 (1.1)	25.9 (−3.4)	16.9 (−8.4)	9.6 (−12.4)	23.5 (−4.7)
Average precipitation inches (mm)	4.32 (110)	4.22 (107)	4.47 (114)	5.64 (143)	4.26 (108)	2.22 (56)	2.13 (54)	2.22 (56)	2.78 (71)	3.83 (97)	4.20 (107)	3.87 (98)	44.16 (1,121)
Source 1: XMACIS2
Source 2: NOAA (Precipitation)
