= Walden–Jackson County Airport =

- IATA: none; ICAO: none; FAA LID: 33V

Summary
- Airport type: Public
- Owner: Jackson County
- Serves: Walden, Colorado
- Elevation AMSL: 8,153 ft / 2,485 m
- Coordinates: 40°45′01″N 106°16′17″W
- Website: Official website
- Interactive map of Walden–Jackson County Airport

Runways
| Direction | Length | | Surface |
| Direction | ft | m | Surface |
|---|---|---|---|
| 4/22 | 5,900 | 1,798 | Asphalt |
| 17/35 | 4,020 | 1,225 | Turf |

Statistics (2018)
- Aircraft operations: 1,000
- Based aircraft: 9
- Source: Federal Aviation Administration

Walden–Jackson County Airport (FAA LID: 33V) is a mile northeast of Walden, in Jackson County, Colorado.

== Facilities ==
The airport covers 320 acres (130 ha) at an elevation of 8,153 feet (2,485 m). It has two runways: 4/22 is 5,900 by 75 feet (1,798 x 23 m) asphalt; 17/35 is 4,020 by 100 feet (1,225 x 30 m) turf.

In 2018 the airport had 1,000 general aviation operations. Nine aircraft were then based at this airport: 8 single-engine, and 1 multi-engine.

== See also ==
- List of airports in Colorado
