= Coalmont, Colorado =

Unincorporated community in Jackson County, Colorado, United States

- unincorporated community
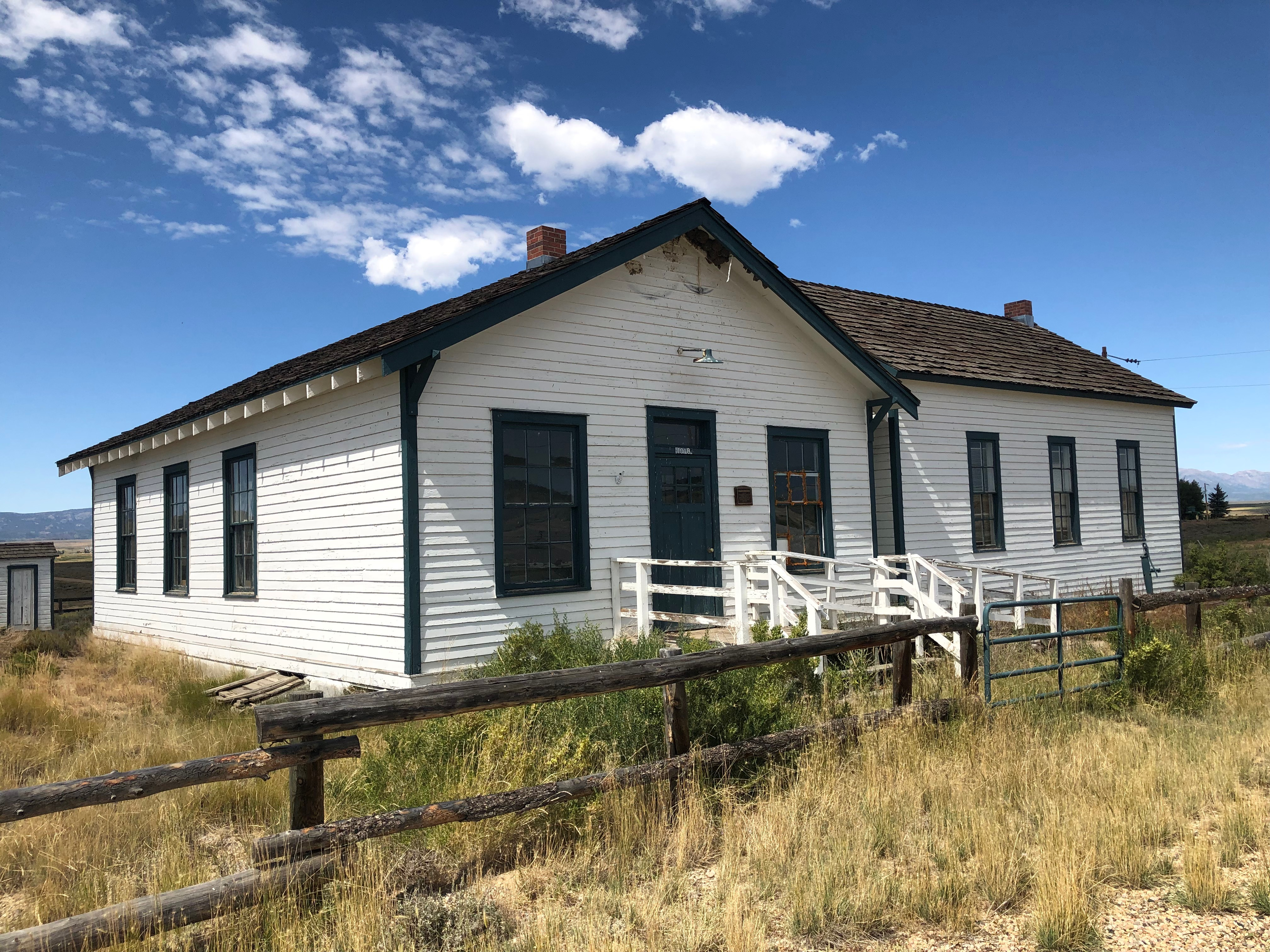
- Coalmont Schoolhouse circa 1915. Restored 1997 by Spicer Club

- Location of Coalmont, Colorado. Coalmont (Colorado)
- Coordinates: 40°33′45″N 106°26′40″W
- Country: United States
- State: Colorado
- County: Jackson

Government
  - Type: unincorporated community
  - Body: Jackson County
- Elevation: 8,216 ft (2,504 m)
- Time zone: UTC−07:00 (MST)
  - Summer (DST): UTC−06:00 (MDT)
- ZIP code: Walden 80480
- Area codes: 970/748
- GNIS place ID: 172604

Coalmont is an unincorporated community and U.S. Post Office in Jackson County, Colorado, United States.

== History ==
The town is named for the open-pit lignite coal mines in the area, from which coal was shipped out on the Union Pacific Railroad to the mainline at Laramie, Wyoming.

The Coalmont, Colorado, post office operated from March 11, 1912, until December 21, 1983. The Walden, Colorado, post office (ZIP code 80480) now serves the area.

=== Mining history ===
Coalmont was a mining town associated with the production of coal from the Coalmont Coal District. In the Coalmont Coal District, commercial coal mining from the Coalmont Formation started in 1909 and continued until the close of World War II when coal production ceased. Since then, the mines were inactive, until 1959 when a new open pit mine was opened and some coal was mined and sold in the Denver, Colorado area. However, coal mining ceased a year or two later and there has been no production of coal since that time, despite some coal prospecting in 1964 and 1965. The estimated coal production in 1941 was 1,438,355 tons, and the original reserves at 177,450,000 tons of subbituminous coal.

== Geography ==
=== Climate ===
Spicer is a weather station roughly 6 miles (9.7 km) south of Coalmont, at an elevation of 8,385 ft (2,556 m). Spicer has a subalpine climate (Köppen Dfc), bordering on a humid continental climate (Köppen Dfb).

Climate data for Spicer, Colorado, 1991–2020 normals, 1912-2020 extremes: 8385ft (2556m)
| Month | Jan | Feb | Mar | Apr | May | Jun | Jul | Aug | Sep | Oct | Nov | Dec | Year |
|---|---|---|---|---|---|---|---|---|---|---|---|---|---|
| Record high °F (°C) | 56 (13) | 65 (18) | 80 (27) | 73 (23) | 82 (28) | 90 (32) | 91 (33) | 91 (33) | 90 (32) | 78 (26) | 70 (21) | 75 (24) | 91 (33) |
| Mean maximum °F (°C) | 43.6 (6.4) | 45.3 (7.4) | 53.0 (11.7) | 63.6 (17.6) | 72.5 (22.5) | 80.2 (26.8) | 84.0 (28.9) | 82.2 (27.9) | 78.2 (25.7) | 68.6 (20.3) | 54.5 (12.5) | 44.0 (6.7) | 83.2 (28.4) |
| Mean daily maximum °F (°C) | 28.5 (−1.9) | 31.1 (−0.5) | 39.5 (4.2) | 49.2 (9.6) | 59.4 (15.2) | 71.0 (21.7) | 76.6 (24.8) | 75.6 (24.2) | 68.3 (20.2) | 55.3 (12.9) | 38.7 (3.7) | 29.1 (−1.6) | 51.9 (11.0) |
| Daily mean °F (°C) | 17.9 (−7.8) | 20.2 (−6.6) | 27.5 (−2.5) | 36.1 (2.3) | 44.8 (7.1) | 53.3 (11.8) | 59.3 (15.2) | 58.1 (14.5) | 51.2 (10.7) | 39.9 (4.4) | 27.2 (−2.7) | 18.9 (−7.3) | 37.9 (3.3) |
| Mean daily minimum °F (°C) | 7.3 (−13.7) | 9.3 (−12.6) | 15.4 (−9.2) | 22.9 (−5.1) | 30.1 (−1.1) | 35.6 (2.0) | 42.0 (5.6) | 40.5 (4.7) | 34.1 (1.2) | 24.6 (−4.1) | 15.8 (−9.0) | 8.8 (−12.9) | 23.9 (−4.5) |
| Mean minimum °F (°C) | −17.5 (−27.5) | −18.7 (−28.2) | −9.0 (−22.8) | 2.7 (−16.3) | 15.5 (−9.2) | 24.4 (−4.2) | 31.1 (−0.5) | 30.1 (−1.1) | 16.4 (−8.7) | 4.9 (−15.1) | −9.1 (−22.8) | −18.2 (−27.9) | −25.3 (−31.8) |
| Record low °F (°C) | −48 (−44) | −50 (−46) | −36 (−38) | −17 (−27) | 0 (−18) | 11 (−12) | 19 (−7) | 20 (−7) | 0 (−18) | −14 (−26) | −32 (−36) | −43 (−42) | −50 (−46) |
| Average precipitation inches (mm) | 0.97 (25) | 1.08 (27) | 1.23 (31) | 1.62 (41) | 1.53 (39) | 1.02 (26) | 1.54 (39) | 1.26 (32) | 1.71 (43) | 1.16 (29) | 1.06 (27) | 0.97 (25) | 15.15 (384) |
| Average snowfall inches (cm) | 17.5 (44) | 20.5 (52) | 19.6 (50) | 15.7 (40) | 5.9 (15) | 0.3 (0.76) | 0.0 (0.0) | 0.0 (0.0) | 1.0 (2.5) | 7.2 (18) | 18.4 (47) | 19.5 (50) | 125.6 (319.26) |
| Average precipitation days (≥ 0.01 in) | 9.0 | 8.3 | 7.6 | 9.5 | 9.4 | 7.7 | 8.8 | 11.0 | 8.7 | 6.4 | 8.7 | 7.3 | 102.4 |
| Average snowy days (≥ 0.1 in) | 8.3 | 7.4 | 7.3 | 6.4 | 1.9 | 0.3 | 0.0 | 0.0 | 0.5 | 2.8 | 8.3 | 8.0 | 51.2 |
Source 1: NOAA (1981-2010 snowfall & snow days)
Source 2: XMACIS2 (records & 1981-2010 monthly max/mins)

== Geology ==
Coalmont, Colorado, is the type locality of the Coalmont Formation.

== See also ==
- List of ghost towns in Colorado
- List of populated places in Colorado
- List of post offices in Colorado
