= Pearl, Colorado =

Unincorporated community in Jackson County, CO, USA

Pearl
- Unincorporated community
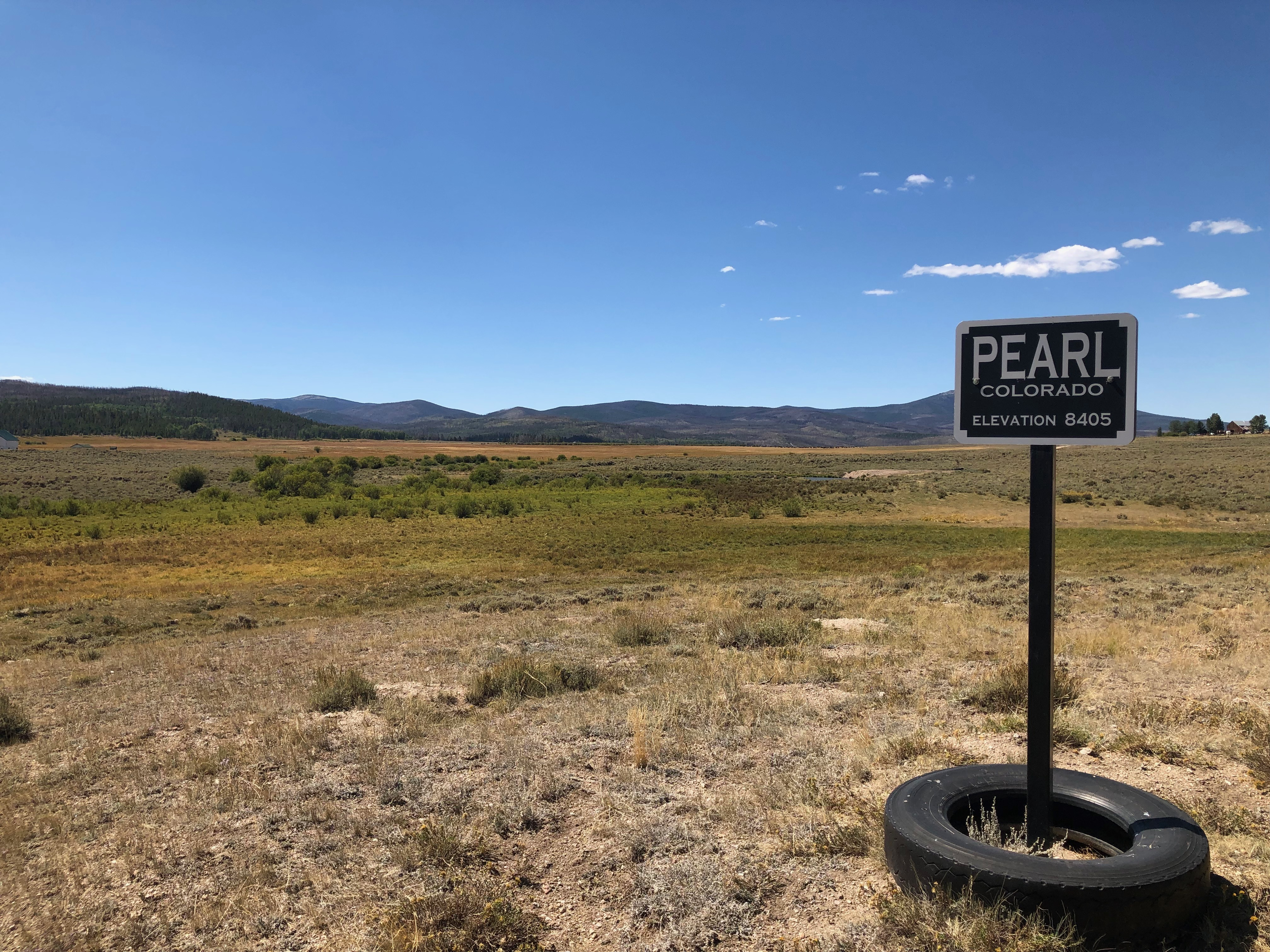
- Improvised road sign, September 2019
- Interactive map of Pearl
- Coordinates: 40°59′07″N 106°32′49″W
- Country: United States
- State: Colorado
- County: Jackson County
- Named for: Pearl Burnett

Pearl is an unincorporated community in Jackson County, Colorado, United States.

== History ==
A post office called Pearl was established in 1889, and remained in operation until 1919. The community has the name of Pearl Burnett.
