= Michigan River =

River in Colorado, United States

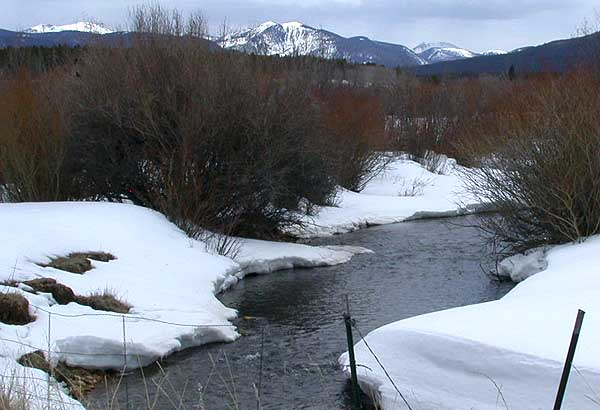
- The Michigan River from SH 14 near Gould

Physical characteristics
- Source
  - location: Michigan Lakes
  - coordinates: 40°29′03″N 105°52′45″W
  - elevation: 11,208 ft (3,416 m)
- Mouth
  - location: Confluence with North Platte
  - coordinates: 40°52′37″N 106°20′22″W
  - elevation: 7,864 ft (2,397 m)
- Length: 69 mi (111 km)

Basin features
- Progression: North Platte—Platte— Missouri—Mississippi

The Michigan River is a tributary of the North Platte River, approximately 69 miles (111 km) long, in north central Colorado in the United States. It drains a rural part of the eastern side of North Park in eastern Jackson County. The river issues from Michigan Lakes, a chain of alpine lakes at 11,208 ft (3,416 m), along the continental divide in southeast Jackson County just east of Nokhu Crags. It descends north then west to flow past the south end of Cameron Pass, and descends from the pass along the route of State Highway 14, past Gould, then northwest through the ranch country of North Park, where it becomes a largely braided stream with a wide river bottom. It passes just east of Walden, and receives the Illinois River from the south just north of Walden. It joins the North Platte from the south approximately 5 miles (8 km) downstream to the north.

== See also ==
- List of rivers of Colorado
