= Gould, Colorado =

Unincorporated community in Jackson County, CO, USA

Gould
- Unincorporated community
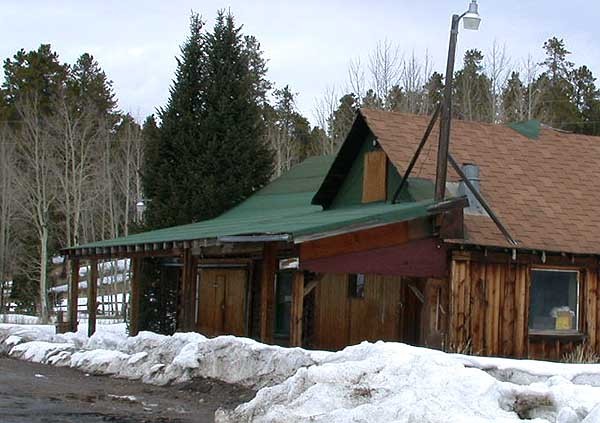
- General store along State Highway 14 in Gould, April 2005
- Etymology: Edward Bradley Gould
- Location within Colorado
- Coordinates: 40°31′35″N 106°01′36″W
- Country: United States
- State: Colorado
- County: Jackson County
- Elevation: 8,921 ft (2,719 m)
- Time zone: UTC−07:00 (MST)
  - Summer (DST): UTC−06:00 (MDT)
- GNIS feature ID: 172696

Gould is a small unincorporated community in southeastern Jackson County, Colorado, United States.

== Description ==
The community is located on State Highway 14, southeast of Walden in North Park. The community is situated in the valley of the Middle Fork of the Michigan River between Owl Mountain and Gould Mountain. The landscape is a patchwork of wetlands, pine forest, aspen groves, and sagebrush. A tavern, campgrounds, community center, and several other businesses cater to local residents, campers and sportsmen. The largest public attraction is the Colorado State Forest Headquarters and Moose Visitor Center. Located at 40.526°N, 106.026°W, the community lies at an elevation of 8913 feet (2717m).

A post office called Gould was established in 1937, and remained in operation until 1973.

Luke Jones is currently the Mayor of Gould. Al Stace is the sheriff. The community has the name of Edward Bradley Gould, a cattleman.

== Climate ==
Gould has a subarctic climate (Köppen Dfc).

Climate data for Gould, Colorado, 1991–2020 normals: 9000ft (2743m)
Month	Jan	Feb	Mar	Apr	May	Jun	Jul	Aug	Sep	Oct	Nov	Dec	Year
Record high °F (°C)	54 (12)	56 (13)	60 (16)	70 (21)	77 (25)	86 (30)	85 (29)	84 (29)	82 (28)	74 (23)	60 (16)	53 (12)	86 (30)
Mean maximum °F (°C)	46.7 (8.2)	47.0 (8.3)	53.1 (11.7)	61.0 (16.1)	71.0 (21.7)	78.3 (25.7)	81.7 (27.6)	79.6 (26.4)	75.6 (24.2)	66.7 (19.3)	55.1 (12.8)	46.3 (7.9)	82.1 (27.8)
Mean daily maximum °F (°C)	29.0 (−1.7)	30.4 (−0.9)	38.0 (3.3)	45.0 (7.2)	54.8 (12.7)	66.8 (19.3)	72.9 (22.7)	71.6 (22.0)	64.3 (17.9)	50.5 (10.3)	37.9 (3.3)	30.0 (−1.1)	49.3 (9.6)
Daily mean °F (°C)	15.8 (−9.0)	17.5 (−8.1)	25.0 (−3.9)	32.3 (0.2)	40.9 (4.9)	50.2 (10.1)	56.3 (13.5)	54.8 (12.7)	47.7 (8.7)	36.1 (2.3)	24.9 (−3.9)	17.0 (−8.3)	34.9 (1.6)
Mean daily minimum °F (°C)	2.7 (−16.3)	4.6 (−15.2)	12.0 (−11.1)	19.6 (−6.9)	27.1 (−2.7)	33.5 (0.8)	39.7 (4.3)	38.0 (3.3)	31.1 (−0.5)	21.7 (−5.7)	11.9 (−11.2)	3.9 (−15.6)	20.5 (−6.4)
Mean minimum °F (°C)	−22.1 (−30.1)	−20.6 (−29.2)	−10.8 (−23.8)	0.2 (−17.7)	13.2 (−10.4)	23.5 (−4.7)	31.7 (−0.2)	29.8 (−1.2)	19.7 (−6.8)	4.0 (−15.6)	−10.0 (−23.3)	−21.0 (−29.4)	−27.0 (−32.8)
Record low °F (°C)	−35 (−37)	−46 (−43)	−30 (−34)	−15 (−26)	−1 (−18)	19 (−7)	27 (−3)	24 (−4)	12 (−11)	−14 (−26)	−24 (−31)	−31 (−35)	−46 (−43)
Average precipitation inches (mm)	1.72 (44)	2.53 (64)	1.84 (47)	2.65 (67)	2.30 (58)	1.66 (42)	2.35 (60)	2.07 (53)	1.89 (48)	2.04 (52)	1.66 (42)	1.59 (40)	24.3 (617)
Average snowfall inches (cm)	24.3 (62)	28.2 (72)	23.4 (59)	23.7 (60)	11.4 (29)	1.8 (4.6)	0.0 (0.0)	trace	1.7 (4.3)	12.6 (32)	21.4 (54)	22.8 (58)	171.3 (434.9)
Source 1: NOAA
Source 2: XMACIS (snowfall, records & monthly max/mins)

== History ==
The North Park basin was inhabited by Native American for thousands of years. In the late 19th century white settlers moved into the area. The Ute Indians were subsequently forced to distant reservations at the orders of Gov. Frederick Walker Pitkin. Some Indians remained in the region until the 1920s. In 1886, the LaFever saw-mill opened and in 1887, Edward Bradley Gould, for whom the town is named, homesteaded 640 acres. His only son, Eddy Gould, was the town's first mailcarrier.

Life at the turn of the 20th century was centered on the timber industry. In 1939 the town of Gould and the Bockman Lumber Camp built simple log cabin schools. A post office and gas station/hotel were also built as well as a general store, known as Belle and Earl's. The population peaked at ~300 in 1949. A popular "sportin' house" was run by two older women by the name of Meryl and Maude. It was later known as M&M Lodge.

"During the early 1930s, two Civilian Conservation Corps Camps were built on the state land. The camp south of Gould was later converted into a Prisoner of War Camp during WWII for Germans as well as American conscientious objectors. The German Prisoners of War were used as timber laborers. In the Spring of 1945, a few prisoners escaped the camp and broke into E.B. Shawver's summer home. They had maps drawn of plans to escape to Mexico, but were discovered the next morning, having had too much to drink from the wine cabinet the night before and were walked back to camp barefoot."

"After the German POW's departed, the cabins were used as a 4-H camp and by various other groups in the summer."

In the 1950s the Colorado State Forest was created and the headquarters were built on the grounds of a former fish hatchery.

The restaurant in town was owned by Carl Berwald of Stillwater, Minnesota. It was known as Berwald's Cookhouse in the 1970s when Belle and Earl were running their general store and renamed Drifter's Cookhouse by a new owner in later years.

In the 1990s plans to convert the town of Gould and neighboring Colorado State Forest into a ski resort were defeated.

== Common wildlife ==
- Birds: broad-tailed hummingbird, rufous hummingbird, Steller's jay, Clark's nutcracker
- Fish: brook trout, brown trout, cutthroat trout
- Insects: mosquito, longhorn beetle
- Mammals: beaver, cougar (mountain lion), lynx, elk, American marten, black bear, mule deer, pronghorn, moose
- Plants: blue spruce, lodgepole pine, quaking aspen, willow
