= North Park (Colorado basin) =

High basin in the state of Colorado

Coordinates: 40.81°N 106.30°W

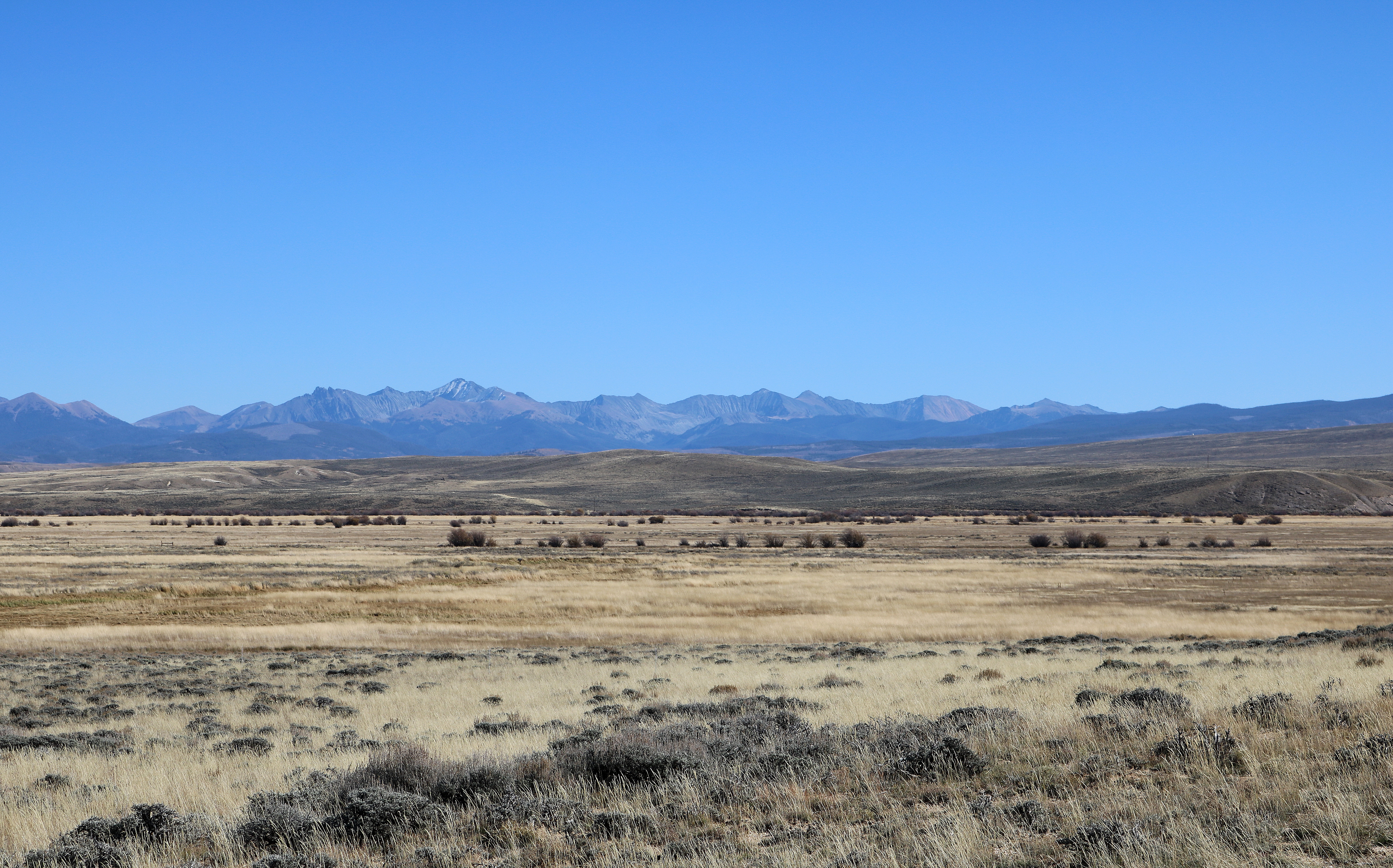
Looking across North Park from State Highway 125 towards the Never Summer Mountains.

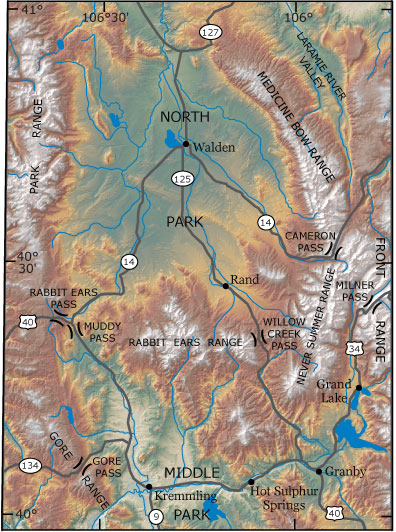
Map showing North and Middle Park.

North Park is a high, sparsely populated basin (approximately 8,800 feet (2,700 m) in elevation) in the Rocky Mountains in north central Colorado in the United States. It encompasses a wide valley in Jackson County rimmed by mountain ranges at the headwaters of the North Platte River and several smaller tributaries, including the Michigan River, Illinois River, and Canadian River. The valley receives its name from being the northernmost of the three large mountain valleys (or parks) in Colorado on the western side of the Front Range. The others are Middle Park and South Park respectively.

The basin opens northward into Wyoming, in the direction of flow of the North Platte. On the east side, it is rimmed by the Medicine Bow Mountains, the Never Summer Mountains and Rabbit Ears Range to the south, and the Park Range to the west. The continental divide rims the Park along the south and west. The valley along the Illinois River is the location of the Arapaho National Wildlife Refuge. The largest community in the valley is Walden, the Jackson County seat, that sits near the middle of the valley near the confluence of the Michigan and Illinois rivers. Smaller communities in the valley include the unincorporated hamlets of Gould and Rand.

The primary economic activities in the valley are cattle ranching and timber harvesting, although the latter has declined substantially in recent decades. In the 1940s, wolves were nearly extirpated from the conterminous United States. Wolves were reintroduced in the northern Rocky Mountains in the 1990s and since at least 2014, solitary wolves have entered Colorado. Wolves have migrated in from Wyoming and in 2021, a pack began killing cattle.

The valley is crossed east-west by State Highway 14, which enters from the east over Cameron Pass, providing a link to the Poudre Canyon and Fort Collins. Highway 14 enters from the west over Muddy Pass which provides access to Steamboat Springs and Middle Park in the valley of the Colorado River. It is crossed north-south by State Highway 125, which enters from the north (from Wyoming) along the course of the North Platte. It enters from the south over Willow Creek Pass, providing access to the upper end of Middle Park near Granby.

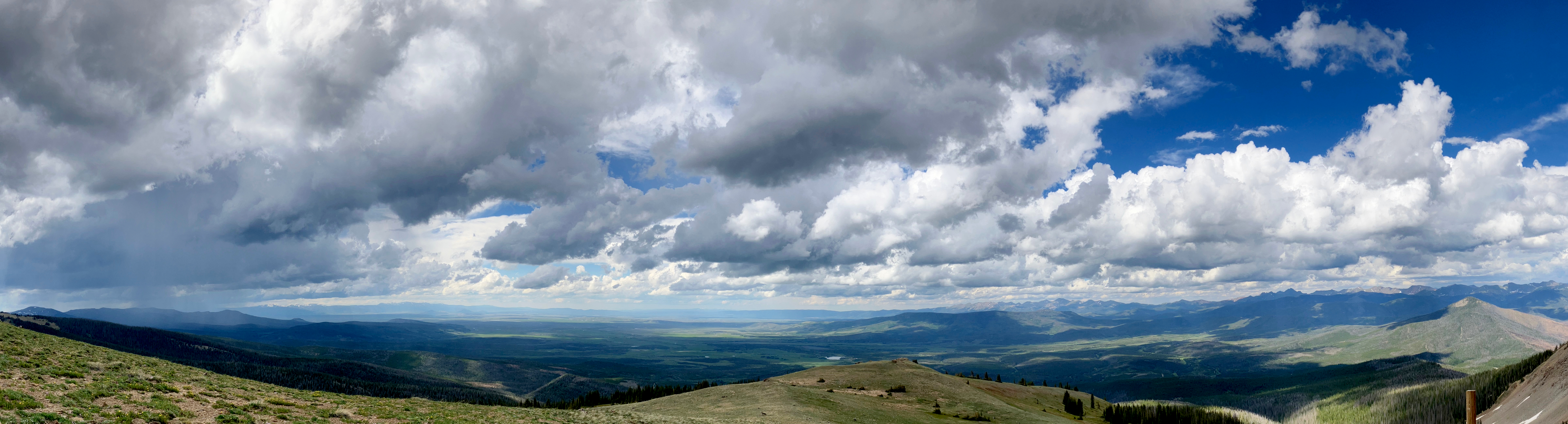
View of North Park basin from Parkview Mountain (June 2024). Far right: Radial Mountain (part of the Rabbit Ears Range). Behind it and stretching towards the center of the image are the Never Summer and Medicine Bow Mountains. On the far left is an extrusion of the Rabbit Ears Range, with the Park Range visible in the far distance behind it.

== Geology and mineral resources ==
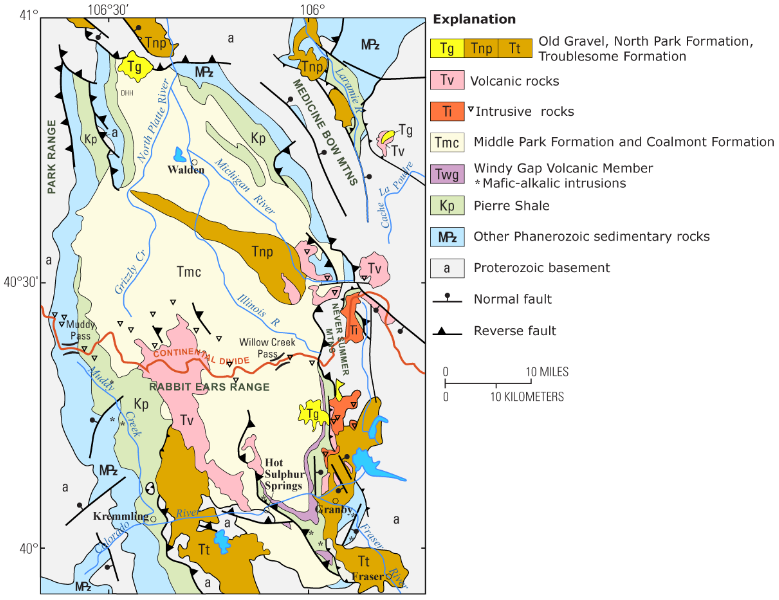
North Park Basin geological map.

The valley floor is underlain by Mesozoic sedimentary rocks that form a structural basin. The stratigraphy is similar to that in adjacent basins such as the Green River Basin to the west and the Denver Basin to the east. Information provided on Fish and Wildlife Service plaques at an overlook southeast of Walden indicates that the area was formerly a shallow sea, and that fossilized shark teeth can be found in the area.

Petroleum has long been produced from anticlinal traps of the Muddy Sandstone (Cretaceous) at North McCallum and South McCallum oil fields. In 2007, North Park produced 96 thousand barrels of oil and 1.3 billion cubic feet (BCF) of natural gas from 153 wells. In 2008 EOG Resources announced great success in drilling and completing horizontal oil wells in the Cretaceous Niobrara Formation.

== Industrial city ==
In 1914 Rev Hiram Vrooman proposed the establishment of a utopian community in North Park. It was a co-operative project in which it was envisioned that all the various industries and businesses would be united in a single management, with the "coworker citizens" receiving equitable recompense for their work. They owned the rights on 7,000 acres, 3,000 acres in Sedgwick County and a further 800 acres at Ute Pass. They also owned a pickling factory in Denver.

== In popular culture ==
The fictional town of North Park, CO from the animated series South Park is based on the basin. The town is first mentioned in the Season Two episode Summer Sucks, and is additionally mentioned in Cartmanland, Sarcastaball, and Cartman Joins NAMBLA. Trey Parker, one of the creators of the South Park series, grew up in Conifer, about 40 miles (65 km) east of Fairplay.

== See also ==
- Coalmont Formation
