= Muddy Pass (Continental Divide) =

Mountain pass in Colorado, USA

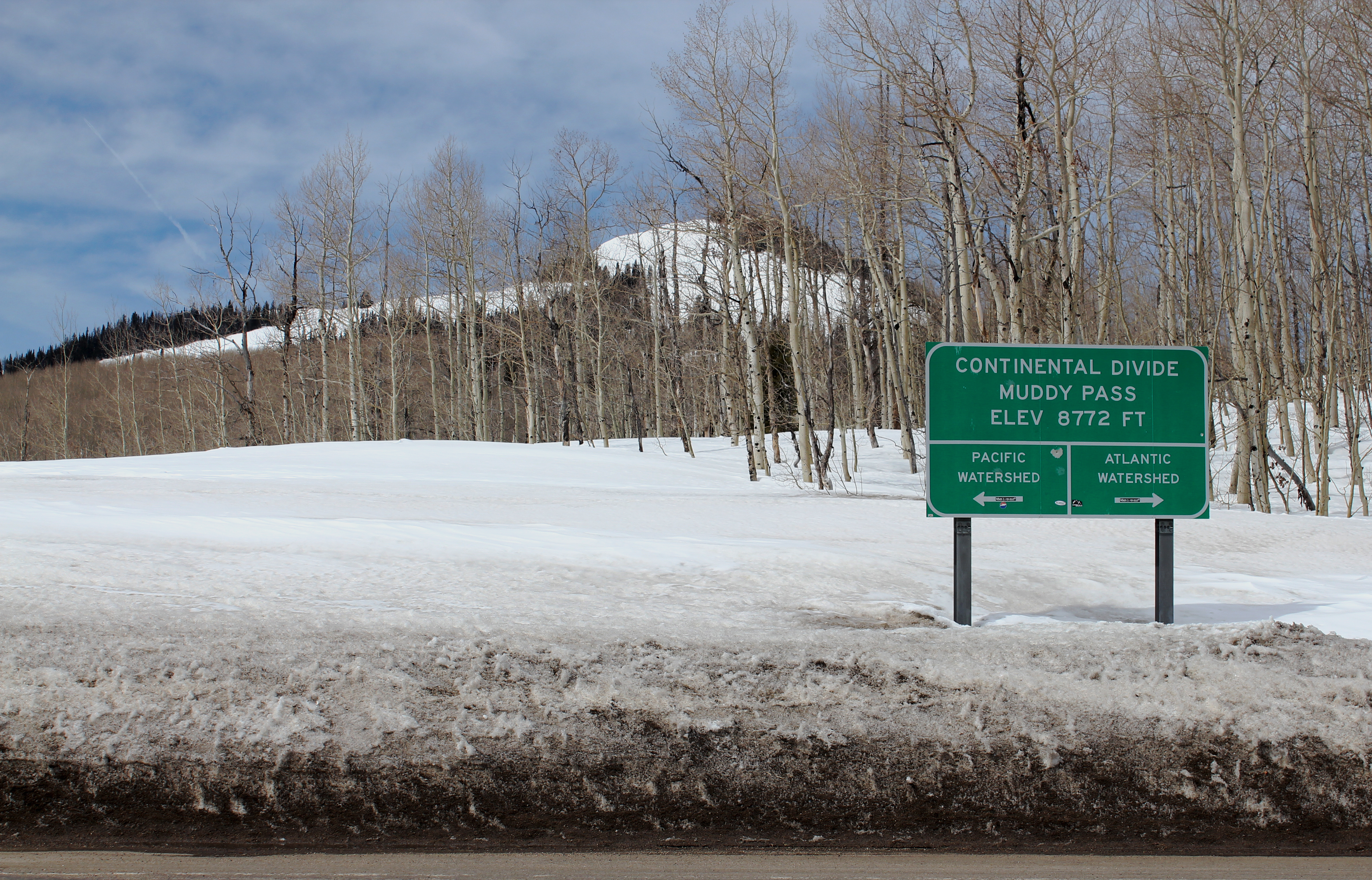
- A view of the sign at the pass in April, 2014.
- Interactive map of Muddy Pass
- Elevation: 8,772 ft (2,674 m)
- Traversed by: US 40

Third Approach
- Location: Grand / Jackson counties, Colorado, U.S.
- Range: Rocky Mountains
- Coordinates: 40°22′36″N 106°34′47″W
- Topo map: USGS topo map

Muddy Pass (elevation 8,772 feet (2,674 m)) is a high mountain pass in the Rocky Mountains of northern Colorado in the United States.

The pass straddles the continental divide along the boundary between Jackson and Grand counties. The pass separates North Park and the headwaters of the North Platte River with Middle Park near the headwaters of the Colorado River. It is named for Muddy Creek, a tributary of the Colorado that descends southward from the pass to join the Colorado at Kremmling.

The pass is one of the lower crossings of the continental divide in Colorado, in a gap between the Park Range to the north and the Rabbit Ears Range to the east. It is rarely closed in winter and has a mild approach on both sides, with no switchbacks or tight spots. It provides the route of U.S. Highway 40 between Kremmling and Steamboat Springs. The road briefly enters the watershed of the North Platte (see North Park). Rabbit Ears Pass, which is just to the west of the pass, provides a third crossing of the continental divide along the U.S. Highway (Berthoud Pass being the other). State Highway 14 from Walden, Colorado has its western terminus at the pass, where it intersects U.S. Highway 40.
