= Colorado State Highway 14 =

State highway in Colorado, United States

State Highway 14
- SH 14 highlighted in red

Route information
- Maintained by CDOT
- Length: 236.92 mi (381.29 km)

Major junctions
- West end: US 40 near Muddy Pass on the continental divide
- US 287 near and in Fort Collins; I-25 / US 87 in Fort Collins; US 85 in Ault
- East end: US 6 / US 138 in Sterling

Location
- Country: United States
- State: Colorado
- Counties: Jackson, Larimer, Weld, Logan

Highway system
- Colorado State Highway System; Interstate; US; State; Scenic
| ← SH 13 | → SH 15 |

State Highway 14 (SH 14) in the U.S. state of Colorado is an east–west state highway approximately 237 miles (381 km) long, making it the longest state highway in Colorado. It traverses four counties along the northern edge of the state, spanning a geography from the continental divide in the Rocky Mountains to the Great Plains, and including North Park, the Poudre Canyon, and the Pawnee National Grassland. It provides the most direct route from Fort Collins westward via Cameron Pass to Walden and Steamboat Springs, and eastward across the plains to Sterling.

The highway is two-lane along its entire route, except for portions near Fort Collins where it is concurrent with U.S. Highway 287, and east of Fort Collins near its interchange with Interstate 25.

The western terminus of the highway is on the continental divide, at a junction with U.S. Highway 40 at the summit of Muddy Pass along the border between Jackson and Grand counties. The eastern terminus is at a junction with U.S. Highway 6 in Sterling.

The entire length of the highway is kept open year-round. Despite its western end being on the continental divide itself, Route 14 through Cameron Pass can be one of the more reliable routes across the Front Range mountains in stormy winter weather.

== Route description ==
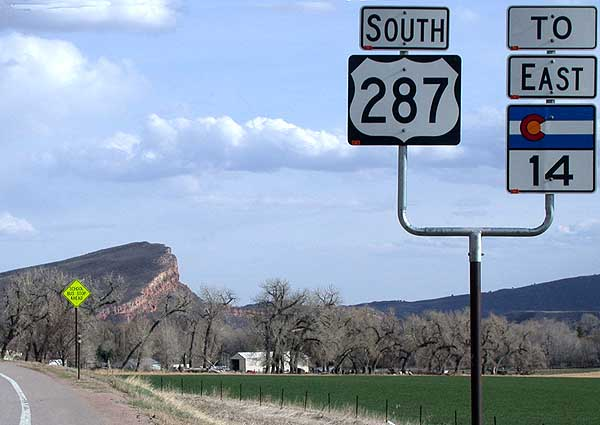
SH 14, here concurrent with US 287, north of Bellvue at Teds Place. Goat Hill near Bellvue can be seen in the background.

Going eastward from Muddy Pass southeast of Steamboat Springs, it transverses through North Park, first going northeast to Walden, then southeast through Gould along the valley of the Michigan River. It then transverses along the southern end of the Medicine Bow Mountains at Cameron Pass, where it enters Larimer County. It then descends through the pass to the northwest along the valley of Joe Wright Creek to Chambers Lake, traveling through the mountains along the valley of the Cache la Poudre River and passing through the Poudre Canyon. It joins U.S. Highway 287 southbound at Teds Place, a longtime local landmark just east of the mouth of the Poudre Canyon. It is concurrent with U.S. Route 287 southward to Fort Collins, where it splits from 287, going east from downtown Fort Collins along East Mulberry Street and reaching Interstate 25 at exit 269. East of I-25, it enters Weld County and passes through Ault, where it intersects U.S. Highway 85. East of Ault, it enters a sparsely populated area of the high plains in eastern Weld County, where it passes through three small towns, Briggsdale, New Raymer, and Stoneham. Along this stretch it passes alongside several parcels of the Pawnee National Grasslands. Its eastern terminus at Sterling is in central Logan County, along the South Platte River, just across the river from Interstate 76.

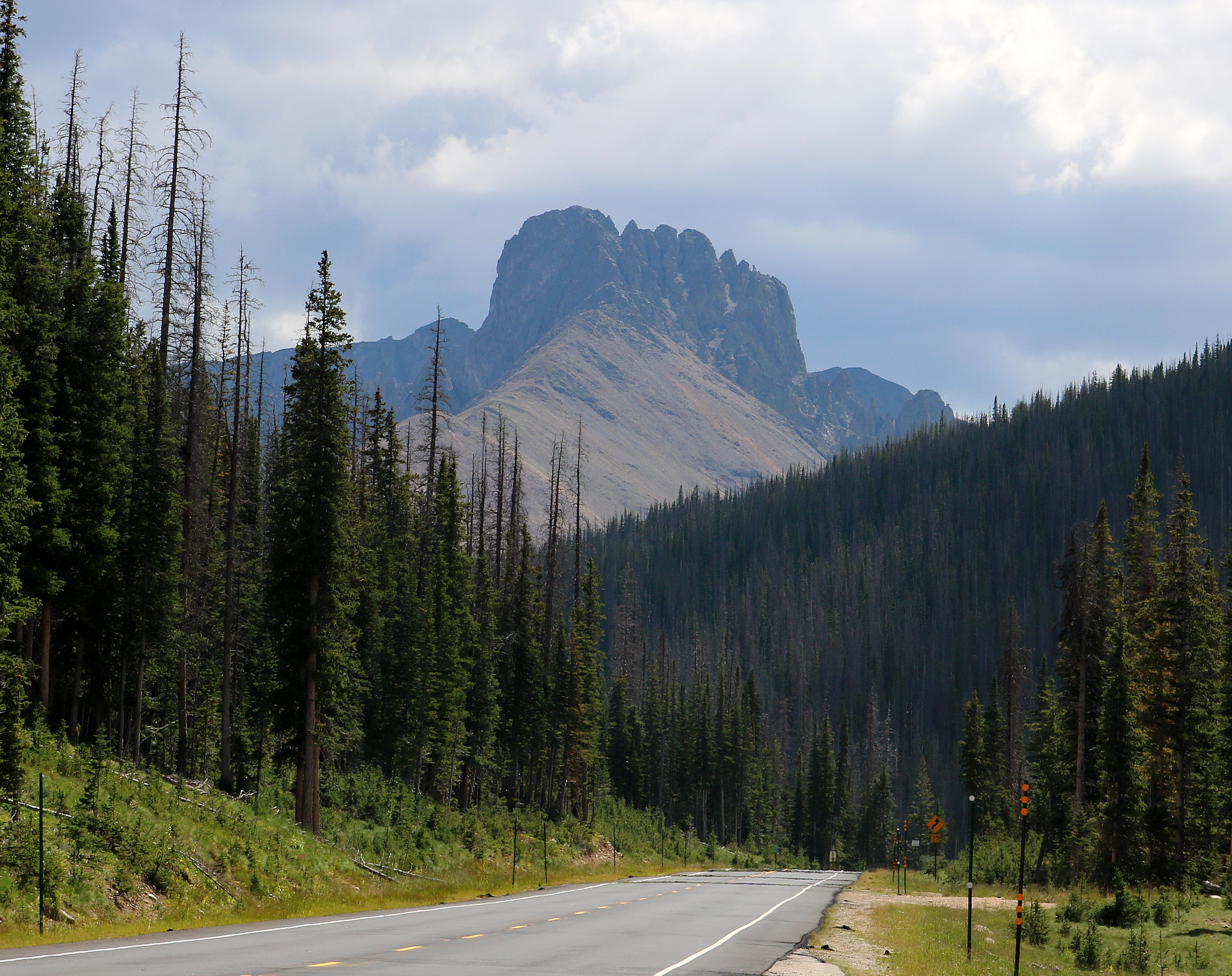
SH 14 looking at the Nokhu Crags in the Never Summer Mountains

== History ==
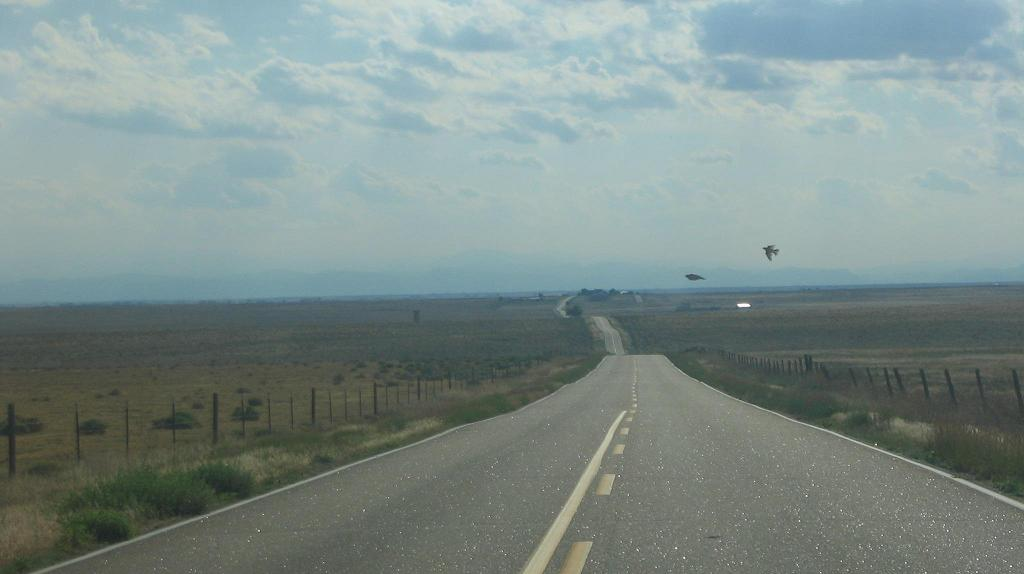
SH 14 crossing the Colorado plains in rural Weld County, near the Pawnee National Grassland.

The section of the road in Fort Collins that is concurrent with Jefferson Street and Riverside Avenue follows a section of the Overland Trail, a stage route and emigrant trail used in the 1860s. The section in Fort Collins was known as the "Denver Road".

The section up the Poudre Canyon was built in the 1920s. Baldwin Tunnel is an unlined hard rock tunnel at milepost 107.3. Originally completed in 1916 as only one lane wide, it was widened to two lanes in 1951.

The route as a Colorado state highway was established in the 1920s from its current western terminus all the way to Nebraska. In 1926, US 38 took over its routing from Sterling, its current eastern terminus, to Nebraska. The route was paved in 1936 from Fort Collins to Ault. The entire route was paved by 1963, and the eastern section of the route concurrent with U.S. Highway 6 east of Sterling was eliminated in 1968. The only gap left was eliminated in 1979.

== Major intersections ==
| County | Location | mi | km | Destinations | Notes |
|---|---|---|---|---|---|
| Jackson | | 0.000 | 0.000 | US 40 – Kremmling, Steamboat Springs | Western terminus at Muddy Pass |
| Jackson | Walden | 32.968 | 53.057 | SH 125 south – Rand | West end of SH 125 overlap |
| Jackson | Walden | 34.090 | 54.863 | SH 125 north – Cowdrey | East end of SH 125 overlap |
| Cameron Pass | | 64.928 | 104.491 | Elevation 10,276 feet (3,132 m) | |
| Larimer | | 121.713 | 195.878 | US 287 north – La Porte, Laramie | West end of US 287 overlap |
| Larimer | Fort Collins | 128.934 | 207.499 | SH 1 north – Wellington | Southern terminus of SH 1 |
| Larimer | Fort Collins | 134.770 | 216.891 | US 287 south – Loveland | East end US 287 overlap |
| Larimer | Fort Collins | 138.968 | 223.647 | I-25 (US 87) – Denver, Cheyenne | I-25 exit 269 |
| Weld | | 144.152 | 231.990 | SH 257 south – Windsor | Northern terminus of SH 257 |
| Weld | Ault | 153.370 | 246.825 | US 85 – Cheyenne, Greeley | |
| Weld | Briggsdale | 176.110 | 283.422 | SH 392 west – Greeley | Eastern terminus of SH 392 |
| Weld | Raymer | 205.236 | 330.295 | SH 52 south – Fort Morgan | Northern terminus of SH 52 |
| Weld | | 211.807 | 340.870 | SH 71 north – Kimball | West end of SH 71 overlap |
| Weld | | 215.828 | 347.341 | SH 71 south – Snyder, Brush | East end of SH 71 overlap |
| Logan | Sterling | 236.824 | 381.131 | US 138 east (3rd Street) / US 6 – Holyoke, Julesburg | Eastern terminus; highway continues as US 6 east (Chestnut Street east) |
1.000 mi = 1.609 km; 1.000 km = 0.621 mi: Concurrency terminus
