= Riverside, Wyoming =

Riverside
- Town
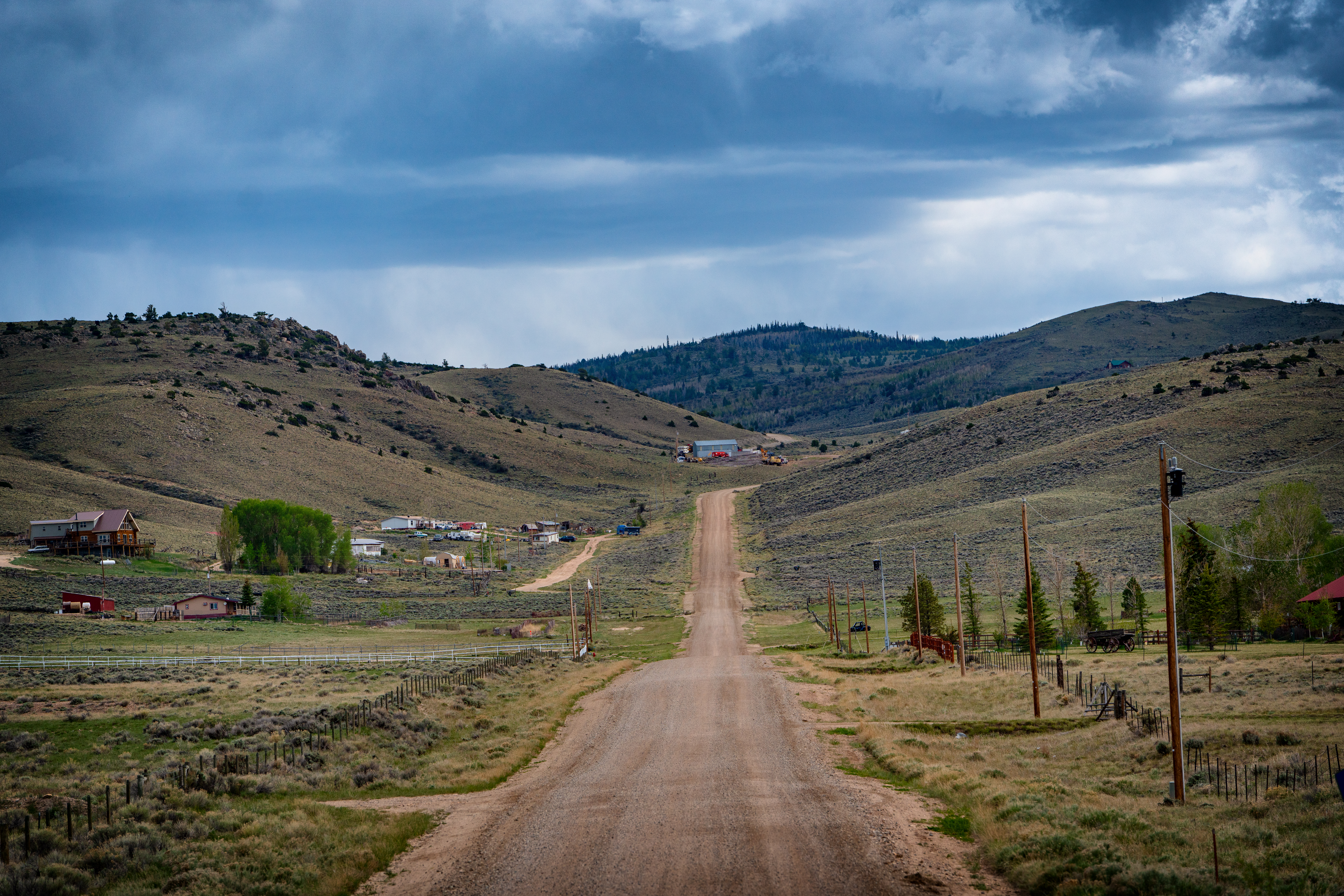
- Blackhall Mountain Road in Riverside, Wyoming

- Location of Riverside in Carbon County, Wyoming
- Coordinates: 41°12′55″N 106°46′53″W
- Country: United States
- State: Wyoming
- County: Carbon

Area
  - Total: 0.27 sq mi (0.70 km^{2})
  - Land: 0.27 sq mi (0.70 km^{2})
  - Water: 0 sq mi (0.00 km^{2})
- Elevation: 7,142 ft (2,177 m)

Population (2020)
  - Total: 66
  - Density: 192.9/sq mi (74.47/km^{2})
- Time zone: UTC-7 (Mountain (MST))
  - Summer (DST): UTC-6 (MDT)
- ZIP code: 82325
- Area code: 307
- GNIS feature ID: 2412557
- FIPS code: 56-66075
- Website: www.riversidewyo.com

Riverside is a town in Carbon County, Wyoming, United States. As of the 2020 census, Riverside had a population of 66.

== Geography ==
According to the United States Census Bureau, the town has a total area of 0.27 square miles (0.70 km^{2}), all land.

According to the U.S. National Climatic Data Center, Riverside is, together with the town of West Yellowstone in Yellowstone National Park, the coldest (inhabited) spot in the whole state of Wyoming. On February 9, 1933, −66 °F or −54.4 °C was recorded there, the coldest temperature ever recorded in Wyoming.

== Demographics ==
Historical population
Census	Pop.	Note	%±
1910	49		—
1920	29		−40.8%
1930	34		17.2%
1940	68		100.0%
1950	50		−26.5%
1960	87		74.0%
1970	46		−47.1%
1980	55		19.6%
1990	85		54.5%
2000	59		−30.6%
2010	52		−11.9%
2020	66		26.9%
2025 (est.)	63	▼	−4.5%
U.S. Decennial Census

=== 2010 census ===
As of the census of 2010, there were 52 people, 34 households, and 15 families residing in the town. The population density was 192.6 inhabitants per square mile (74.4/km^{2}). There were 53 housing units at an average density of 196.3 per square mile (75.8/km^{2}). The racial makeup of the town was 98.1% White and 1.9% Native American. Hispanic or Latino of any race were 1.9% of the population.

There were 34 households, of which 5.9% had children under the age of 18 living with them, 41.2% were married couples living together, 2.9% had a male householder with no wife present, and 55.9% were non-families. 55.9% of all households were made up of individuals, and 20.6% had someone living alone who was 65 years of age or older. The average household size was 1.53 and the average family size was 2.20.

The median age in the town was 58 years. 3.8% of residents were under the age of 18; 3.8% were between the ages of 18 and 24; 15.4% were from 25 to 44; 48.1% were from 45 to 64; and 28.8% were 65 years of age or older. The gender makeup of the town was 59.6% male and 40.4% female.

=== 2000 census ===
As of the census of 2000, there were 59 people, 28 households, and 21 families residing in the town. The population density was 225.6 people per square mile (87.6/km^{2}). There were 45 housing units at an average density of 172.1 per square mile (66.8/km^{2}). The racial makeup of the town was 100.00% White.

There were 28 households, out of which 10.7% had children under the age of 18 living with them, 71.4% were married couples living together, and 25.0% were non-families. 21.4% of all households were made up of individuals, and 7.1% had someone living alone who was 65 years of age or older. The average household size was 2.11 and the average family size was 2.33.

In the town, the population was spread out, with 11.9% under the age of 18, 3.4% from 18 to 24, 18.6% from 25 to 44, 44.1% from 45 to 64, and 22.0% who were 65 years of age or older. The median age was 50 years. For every 100 females, there were 110.7 males. For every 100 females age 18 and over, there were 126.1 males.

The median income for a household in the town was $48,125, and the median income for a family was $55,000. Males had a median income of $23,750 versus $25,417 for females. The per capita income for the town was $40,276. None of the population or families were below the poverty line.

== Education ==
Public education in the town of Riverside is provided by Carbon County School District #2. Encampment School, a K–12 campus in neighboring Encampment, serves the town.
