= Rand, Colorado =

Unincorporated community in Jackson County, CO, USA

- Unincorporated community
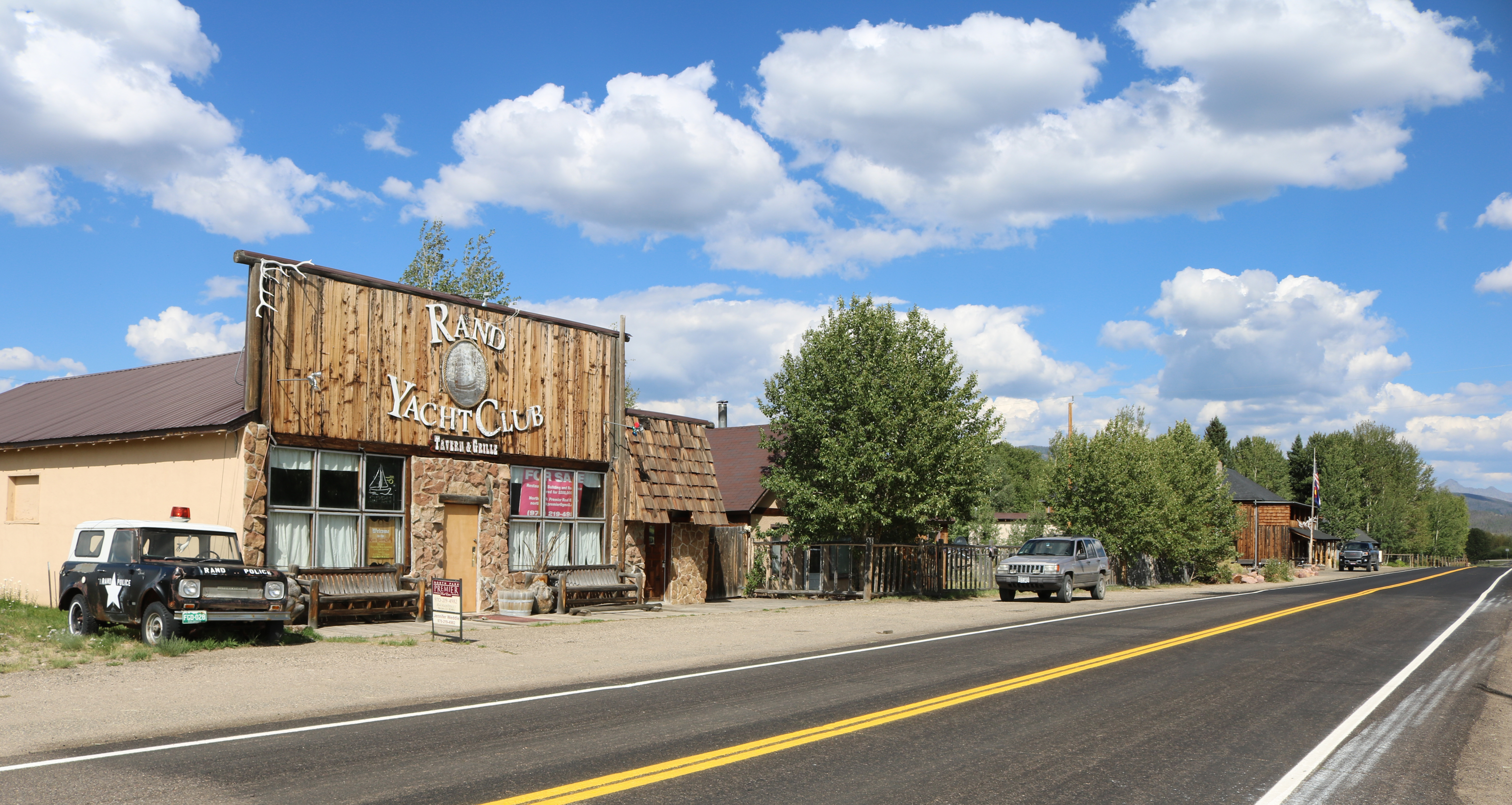
- Buildings along Highway 125 in Rand.

- Location within Colorado
- Coordinates: 40°27′14″N 106°10′53″W
- Country: United States
- State: Colorado
- County: Jackson
- Established: 1881
- Elevation: 8,629 ft (2,630 m)
- Time zone: UTC-7 (MST)
  - Summer (DST): UTC-6 (MDT)
- ZIP code: 80473
- Area code: 970
- GNIS feature ID: 172876

Rand is an unincorporated community, with a U.S. Post Office, established in 1881 in Jackson County, Colorado, United States.

== Description ==
It is a ranching community at the southern end of North Park south of Walden consisting of several homes and businesses, a post office, and ranching facilities. Rand is near the junction of State Highway 125 and Jackson County Road 27 along Indian Creek, at an elevation of 8,627 feet (2,630 meters). The Rand post office has the ZIP code 80473. Some say the community was named after Charles Rand, a pioneer, while others believe it has the name of J. A. Rand, another pioneer. The post office in Rand was established in 1883.
