= Cowdrey, Colorado =

Unincorporated community in Colorado, US

- Unincorporated community
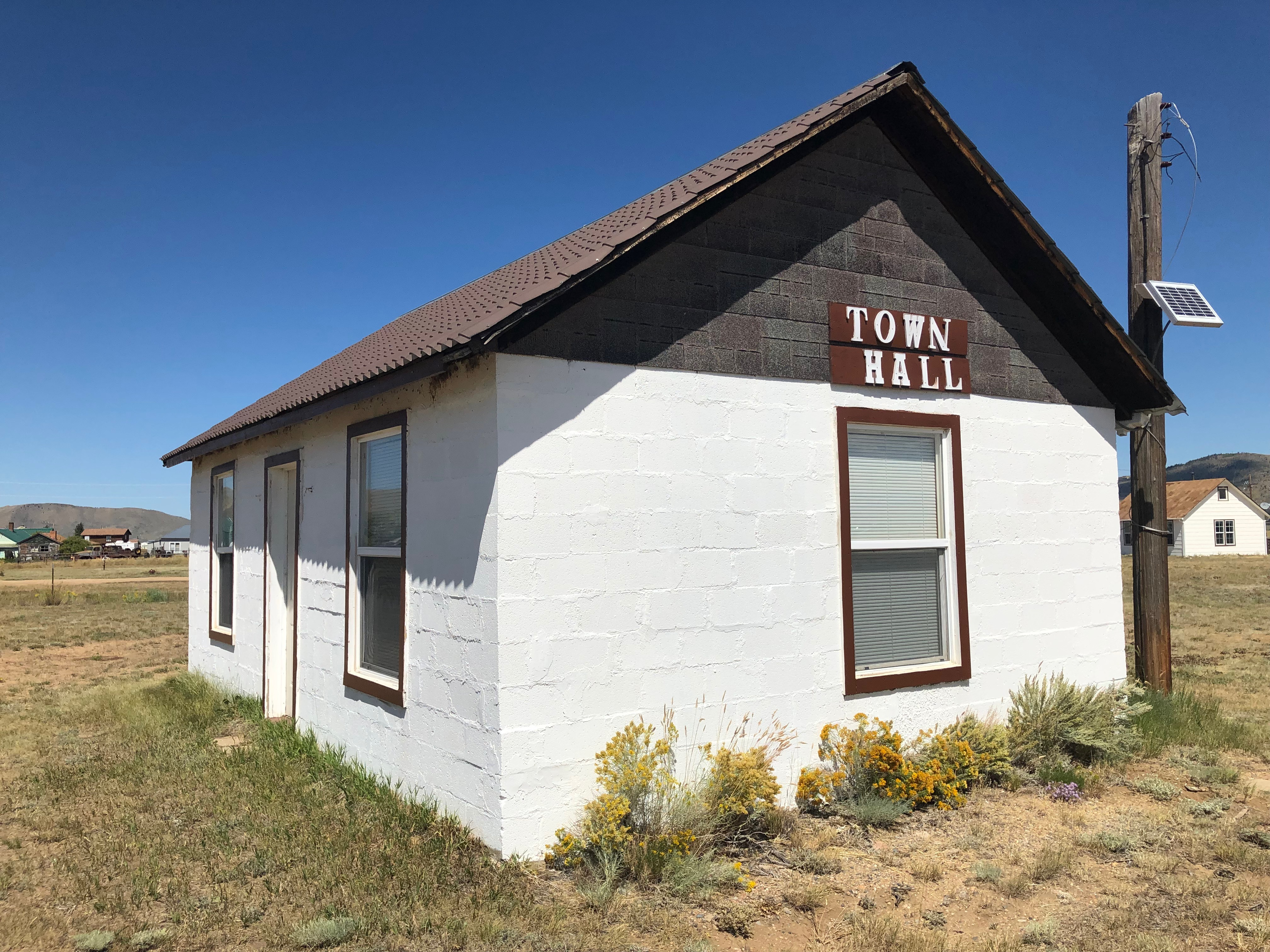
- Cowdrey Town Hall, September 2019

- Location of Cowdrey, Colorado. Cowdrey (Colorado)
- Coordinates: 40°51′35″N 106°18′47″W
- Country: United States
- State: Colorado
- County: Jackson

Government
  - Type: unincorporated community
  - Body: Jackson County
- Elevation: 7,917 ft (2,413 m)

Population (2020)
  - Total: 56
- Time zone: UTC−07:00 (MST)
  - Summer (DST): UTC−06:00 (MDT)
- ZIP code: 80434
- Area codes: 970/748
- GNIS feature ID: 170351

Cowdrey is an unincorporated community with a U.S. Post Office in Jackson County, Colorado, United States. The Cowdrey Post Office has the ZIP Code 80434.

== History ==
The Cowdrey, Colorado, post office opened on April 5, 1915.

== Geography ==
=== Climate ===
Climate data for Cowdrey (CoAgMet), Colorado, 2010–2022 normals: 7895ft (2406m)
Month	Jan	Feb	Mar	Apr	May	Jun	Jul	Aug	Sep	Oct	Nov	Dec	Year
Mean daily maximum °F (°C)	28.6 (−1.9)	31.1 (−0.5)	42.2 (5.7)	49.5 (9.7)	59.0 (15.0)	71.8 (22.1)	77.5 (25.3)	77.8 (25.4)	72.0 (22.2)	55.4 (13.0)	42.4 (5.8)	30.6 (−0.8)	53.2 (11.8)
Daily mean °F (°C)	12.4 (−10.9)	15.9 (−8.9)	26.1 (−3.3)	33.8 (1.0)	43.2 (6.2)	54.5 (12.5)	58.8 (14.9)	55.3 (12.9)	48.4 (9.1)	35.9 (2.2)	25.6 (−3.6)	14.7 (−9.6)	35.4 (1.9)
Mean daily minimum °F (°C)	−3.8 (−19.9)	0.6 (−17.4)	9.9 (−12.3)	18.0 (−7.8)	27.4 (−2.6)	37.0 (2.8)	40.0 (4.4)	32.7 (0.4)	24.7 (−4.1)	16.4 (−8.7)	8.7 (−12.9)	−1.2 (−18.4)	17.5 (−8.0)
Source 1: XMACIS2
Source 2: CoAgMet

== See also ==
- List of populated places in Colorado
- List of post offices in Colorado
