= Jackson County, Colorado =

County in Colorado, United States

- County
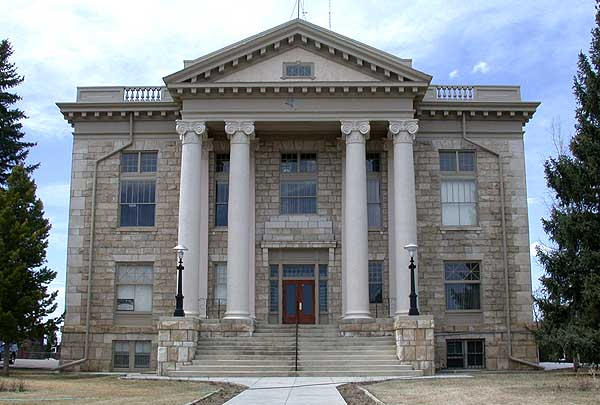
- Jackson County Courthouse in Walden

- Location within the U.S. state of Colorado
- Coordinates: 40.66°N 106.34°W
- Country: United States
- State: Colorado
- Founded: May 5, 1909
- Named for: Andrew Jackson
- Seat: Walden
- Largest town: Walden

Area
  - Total: 1,621 sq mi (4,200 km^{2})
  - Land: 1,614 sq mi (4,180 km^{2})
  - Water: 7.2 sq mi (19 km^{2}) 0.4%

Population (2020)
  - Total: 1,379
  - Estimate (2025): 1,211 ▼
  - Density: 0.8544/sq mi (0.3299/km^{2})
- Time zone: UTC−7 (Mountain)
  - Summer (DST): UTC−6 (MDT)
- Congressional district: 2nd
- Website: jacksoncounty.colorado.gov

Jackson County is a county located in the U.S. state of Colorado. As of the 2020 census, the population was 1,379, and it was the fourth least populated in the state and the least populous “Jackson County” in the United States. The county is named after the United States President Andrew Jackson. The county seat and only municipality in the county is Walden.

== History ==
Most of Jackson County is a high relatively broad intermontane basin known as North Park, which covers 1,613 square miles (4,180 km^{2}). This basin opens north into Wyoming and is rimmed on the west by the Park Range and Sierra Madre Range, on the south by the Rabbit Ears Range and the Never Summer Mountains, and on the east by the Medicine Bow Mountains. Elevations range from 7,800 to 12,953 feet (3,948 m) above sea level and is home to the head waters of the North Platte River. The term park is derived from parc, the French word for game preserve. At one time North Park was filled with herds of deer, antelope and buffalo. There were so many buffalo in the area the Ute Tribe gave North Park the name "Bull Pen." Now deer, elk, and cattle vie for the same area.

In November 1861, Colorado set up 17 counties for the state, including Larimer County. This was where Jackson County would be carved out of in 1909. Before then, both Grand and Larimer Counties claimed the North Park area. In the beginning, no one paid much attention to North Park because it was hunting grounds of the Ute and Arapaho Indians. They fiercely defended these lands and the white settlers were often afraid to venture in. When valuable minerals were discovered in North Park, Grand County claimed it as part of their county because they wanted the revenue it would provide. The residents didn't care much because the county seat for Grand County was closer than the one in Larimer County, and all official business needed to be done at the county seat. But Larimer also claimed this county and it was contested all the way to the Colorado Supreme Court. In 1886 the court decided in favor of Larimer. This did not make the North Park residents very happy and they pushed for their own county until Jackson was formed.

== Geography ==
According to the U.S. Census Bureau, the county has a total area of 1,621 square miles (4,200 km^{2}), of which 1,614 square miles (4,180 km^{2}) is land and 7.2 square miles (19 km^{2}) (0.9%) is water.

Jackson County contains the 71,000-acre (290 km^{2}) Colorado State Forest.

=== Adjacent counties ===
- Albany County, Wyoming - northeast
- Larimer County - east
- Grand County - south
- Routt County - west
- Carbon County, Wyoming - northwest

=== Major highways ===
- U.S. Highway 40
- State Highway 14
- State Highway 125
- State Highway 127

=== Airport ===
Jackson County Airport

Jackson County Airport Info

=== Transportation ===
Bustang's Outrider Service to Muddy Pass

OATS (Older Americans Transport Service)

== Demographics ==
Historical population
Census	Pop.	Note	%±
1910	1,013		—
1920	1,340		32.3%
1930	1,386		3.4%
1940	1,798		29.7%
1950	1,976		9.9%
1960	1,758		−11.0%
1970	1,811		3.0%
1980	1,863		2.9%
1990	1,605		−13.8%
2000	1,577		−1.7%
2010	1,394		−11.6%
2020	1,379		−1.1%
2025 (est.)	1,211	▼	−12.2%
U.S. Decennial Census; 1790-1960 1900-1990; 1990-2000 2010-2020

=== 2020 census ===
As of the 2020 census, the county had a population of 1,379. Of the residents, 17.5% were under the age of 18 and 24.6% were 65 years of age or older; the median age was 48.0 years. For every 100 females there were 104.9 males, and for every 100 females age 18 and over there were 109.4 males. 0.0% of residents lived in urban areas and 100.0% lived in rural areas.

Jackson County, Colorado – Racial and ethnic composition Note: the US Census treats Hispanic/Latino as an ethnic category. This table excludes Latinos from the racial categories and assigns them to a separate category. Hispanics/Latinos may be of any race.
Race / Ethnicity (NH = Non-Hispanic)	Pop 2000	Pop 2010	Pop 2020	% 2000	% 2010	% 2020
White alone (NH)	1,452	1,219	1,161	92.07%	87.45%	84.19%
Black or African American alone (NH)	0	0	0	0.00%	0.00%	0.00%
Native American or Alaska Native alone (NH)	10	13	12	0.63%	0.93%	0.87%
Asian alone (NH)	1	1	2	0.06%	0.07%	0.15%
Pacific Islander alone (NH)	0	0	2	0.00%	0.00%	0.15%
Other race alone (NH)	0	0	5	0.00%	0.00%	0.36%
Mixed race or Multiracial (NH)	11	11	59	0.70%	0.79%	4.28%
Hispanic or Latino (any race)	103	150	138	6.53%	10.76%	10.01%
Total	1,577	1,394	1,379	100.00%	100.00%	100.00%

The racial makeup of the county was 86.9% White, 0.0% Black or African American, 1.0% American Indian and Alaska Native, 0.1% Asian, 0.1% Native Hawaiian and Pacific Islander, 3.6% from some other race, and 8.1% from two or more races. Hispanic or Latino residents of any race comprised 10.0% of the population.

There were 656 households in the county, of which 21.8% had children under the age of 18 living with them and 19.5% had a female householder with no spouse or partner present. About 32.3% of all households were made up of individuals and 14.3% had someone living alone who was 65 years of age or older.

There were 1,190 housing units, of which 44.9% were vacant. Among occupied housing units, 70.4% were owner-occupied and 29.6% were renter-occupied. The homeowner vacancy rate was 5.3% and the rental vacancy rate was 16.4%.

=== 2000 census ===
As of the census of 2000, there were 1,577 people, 661 households, and 442 families living in the county. The population density was 1 person per square mile (0.39 person/km^{2}). There were 1,145 housing units at an average density of 1 per square mile (0.39/km^{2}). The racial makeup of the county was 96.20% White, 0.25% Black or African American, 0.76% Native American, 0.06% Asian, 1.46% from other races, and 1.27% from two or more races. 6.53% of the population were Hispanic or Latino of any race.

There were 661 households, out of which 29.20% had children under the age of 18 living with them, 54.90% were married couples living together, 7.90% had a female householder with no husband present, and 33.00% were non-families. 28.40% of all households were made up of individuals, and 10.10% had someone living alone who was 65 years of age or older. The average household size was 2.37 and the average family size was 2.91.

In the county, the population was spread out, with 25.60% under the age of 18, 5.40% from 18 to 24, 26.90% from 25 to 44, 29.10% from 45 to 64, and 13.10% who were 65 years of age or older. The median age was 40 years. For every 100 females there were 101.40 males. For every 100 females age 18 and over, there were 107.80 males.

The median income for a household in the county was $31,821, and the median income for a family was $37,361. Males had a median income of $26,250 versus $18,417 for females. The per capita income for the county was $17,826. About 10.30% of families and 14.00% of the population were below the poverty line, including 22.50% of those under age 18 and 9.00% of those age 65 or over.

== Politics ==
Jackson County's politics mirror those of neighboring Wyoming in that it is heavily Republican. In no election since 1964 has any Democrat carried the county, and indeed none since then have managed even 40% of the vote.

United States presidential election results for Jackson County, Colorado
Year	Republican		Democratic		Third party(ies)	
Year	No.	%	No.	%	No.	%
1912	218	42.75%	242	47.45%	50	9.80%
1916	157	31.59%	331	66.60%	9	1.81%
1920	402	76.28%	113	21.44%	12	2.28%
1924	394	67.35%	111	18.97%	80	13.68%
1928	401	60.21%	249	37.39%	16	2.40%
1932	390	47.45%	415	50.49%	17	2.07%
1936	419	47.29%	433	48.87%	34	3.84%
1940	526	59.23%	357	40.20%	5	0.56%
1944	463	64.76%	252	35.24%	0	0.00%
1948	327	52.91%	291	47.09%	0	0.00%
1952	579	65.35%	305	34.42%	2	0.23%
1956	594	66.59%	297	33.30%	1	0.11%
1960	504	58.27%	360	41.62%	1	0.12%
1964	354	47.77%	384	51.82%	3	0.40%
1968	474	67.52%	177	25.21%	51	7.26%
1972	623	76.72%	178	21.92%	11	1.35%
1976	455	60.83%	279	37.30%	14	1.87%
1980	673	63.55%	283	26.72%	103	9.73%
1984	722	78.22%	191	20.69%	10	1.08%
1988	584	65.54%	294	33.00%	13	1.46%
1992	422	43.69%	216	22.36%	328	33.95%
1996	486	58.34%	222	26.65%	125	15.01%
2000	682	73.73%	173	18.70%	70	7.57%
2004	710	76.02%	210	22.48%	14	1.50%
2008	624	68.27%	277	30.31%	13	1.42%
2012	600	70.75%	216	25.47%	32	3.77%
2016	629	73.05%	171	19.86%	61	7.08%
2020	681	77.74%	175	19.98%	20	2.28%
2024	634	76.02%	173	20.74%	27	3.24%

United States Senate election results for Jackson County, Colorado2
Year	Republican		Democratic		Third party(ies)	
Year	No.	%	No.	%	No.	%
2020	684	78.89%	164	18.92%	19	2.19%

United States Senate election results for Jackson County, Colorado3
Year	Republican		Democratic		Third party(ies)	
Year	No.	%	No.	%	No.	%
2022	496	72.41%	151	22.04%	38	5.55%

Colorado Gubernatorial election results for Jackson County
Year	Republican		Democratic		Third party(ies)	
Year	No.	%	No.	%	No.	%
2022	526	77.13%	140	20.53%	16	2.35%

== Recreation ==
=== State forest and park ===
- State Forest State Park

=== National wildlife refuge ===
- Arapaho National Wildlife Refuge

=== National forest and wilderness ===
- Routt National Forest
- Mount Zirkel Wilderness
- Never Summer Wilderness
- Platte River Wilderness

=== National trail ===
- Continental Divide National Scenic Trail

=== Bicycle routes ===
- Great Parks Bicycle Route
- TransAmerica Trail Bicycle Route

=== Scenic byway ===
- Cache la Poudre-North Park Scenic Byway

== Communities ==
=== Town ===
- Walden

=== Unincorporated communities ===
- Coalmont
- Cowdrey
- Gould
- Pearl
- Rand

=== Former towns ===
- Bockman Lumber Camp

== See also ==
- List of counties in Colorado
- National Register of Historic Places listings in Jackson County, Colorado
- North County, Jefferson Territory
