= Walden, Colorado =

Town in Jackson County, Colorado, United States

- Town
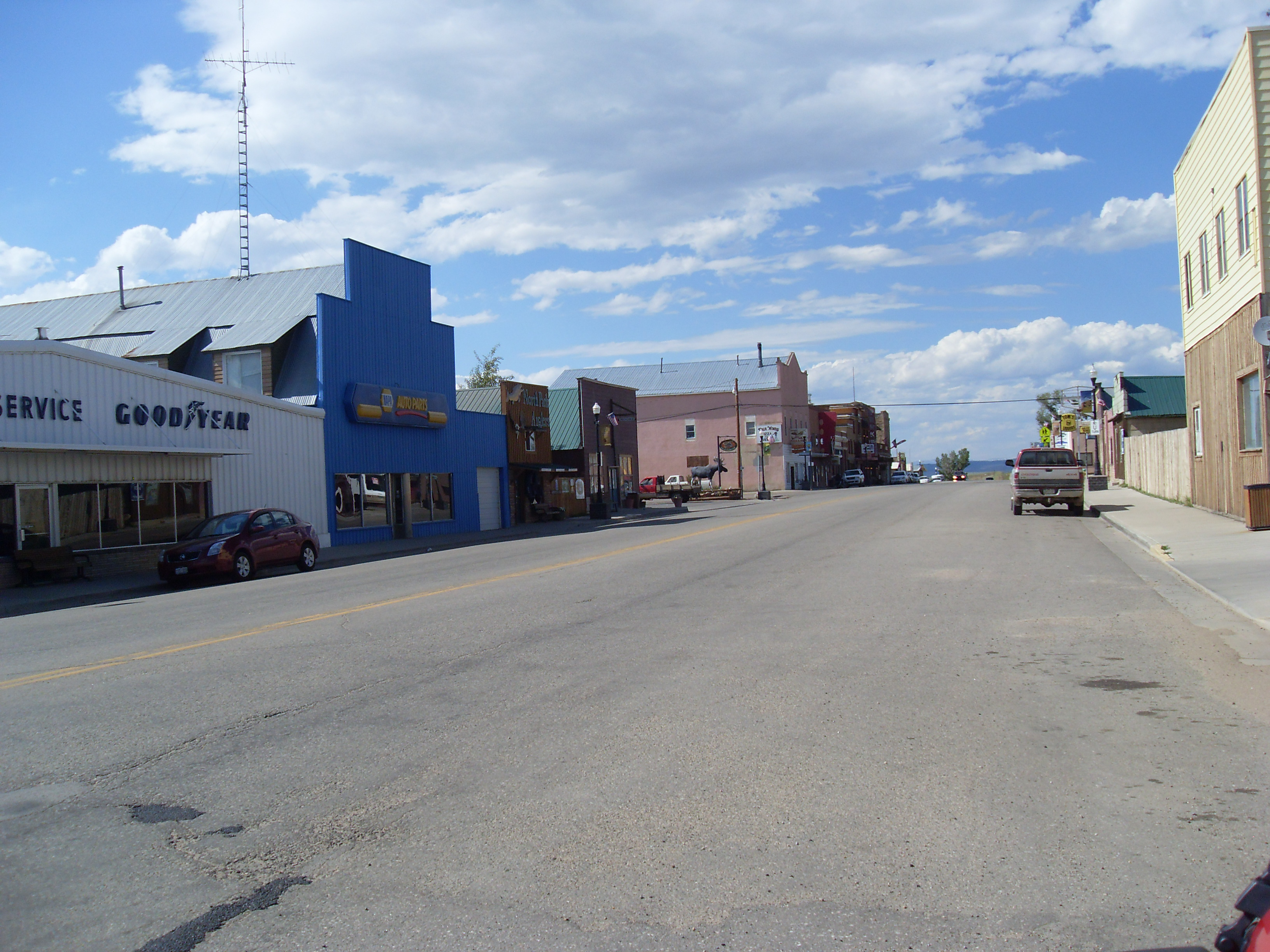
- Main Street in Walden, July 2010

- Location of Walden in Jackson County, Colorado.
- Coordinates: 40°43′54″N 106°16′53″W
- Country: United States
- State: Colorado
- County: Jackson County
- Established: 1889
- Incorporated: December 2, 1890
- Named after: Marcus Aurelius Walden (former postmaster)

Government
  - Type: Statutory town

Area
  - Total: 0.34 sq mi (0.87 km^{2})
  - Land: 0.34 sq mi (0.87 km^{2})
  - Water: 0 sq mi (0.00 km^{2})
- Elevation: 8,098 ft (2,468 m)

Population (2020)
  - Total: 606
  - Density: 1,800/sq mi (700/km^{2})
- Time zone: UTC−7 (Mountain (MST))
  - Summer (DST): UTC−6 (MDT)
- ZIP codes: 80430, 80480
- Area code: 970
- FIPS code: 08-82130
- GNIS feature ID: 2413440
- Website: www.townofwaldenco.com

Walden is the statutory town that is the county seat of, the most populous community in, and the only incorporated municipality in Jackson County, Colorado, United States. The town is situated in the center of a large open valley called North Park. People from Walden and the surrounding area refer to themselves as "North Parkers". The town population was 606 at the 2020 census. The town sits at an elevation of 8,098 feet (2,468 meters). It was established in 1889 and was incorporated December 2, 1890. Mark A. Walden, an early postmaster, gave the community his name.

== Demographics ==
Historical population
Census	Pop.	Note	%±
1890	64		—
1900	141		120.3%
1910	162		14.9%
1920	260		60.5%
1930	284		9.2%
1940	668		135.2%
1950	696		4.2%
1960	809		16.2%
1970	907		12.1%
1980	947		4.4%
1990	890		−6.0%
2000	734		−17.5%
2010	608		−17.2%
2020	606		−0.3%
U.S. Decennial Census

As of the census of 2000, there were 734 people, 330 households, and 207 families residing in the town. The population density was 2,166.9 inhabitants per square mile (836.6/km^{2}). There were 397 housing units at an average density of 1,172.0 per square mile (452.5/km^{2}). The racial makeup of the town was 96.32% White, 0.14% African American, 1.36% Native American, 0.14% Asian, 0.82% from other races, and 1.23% from two or more races. Hispanic or Latino of any race were 6.95% of the population.

There were 330 households, out of which 29.7% had children under the age of 18 living with them, 44.8% were married couples living together, 12.1% had a female householder with no husband present, and 37.0% were non-families. 34.5% of all households were made up of individuals, and 12.1% had someone living alone who was 65 years of age or older. The average household size was 2.21 and the average family size was 2.82.

In the town, the population was spread out, with 25.9% under the age of 18, 6.8% from 18 to 24, 25.5% from 25 to 44, 26.0% from 45 to 64, and 15.8% who were 65 years of age or older. The median age was 40 years. For every 100 females, there were 98.4 males. For every 100 females age 18 and over, there were 99.3 males.

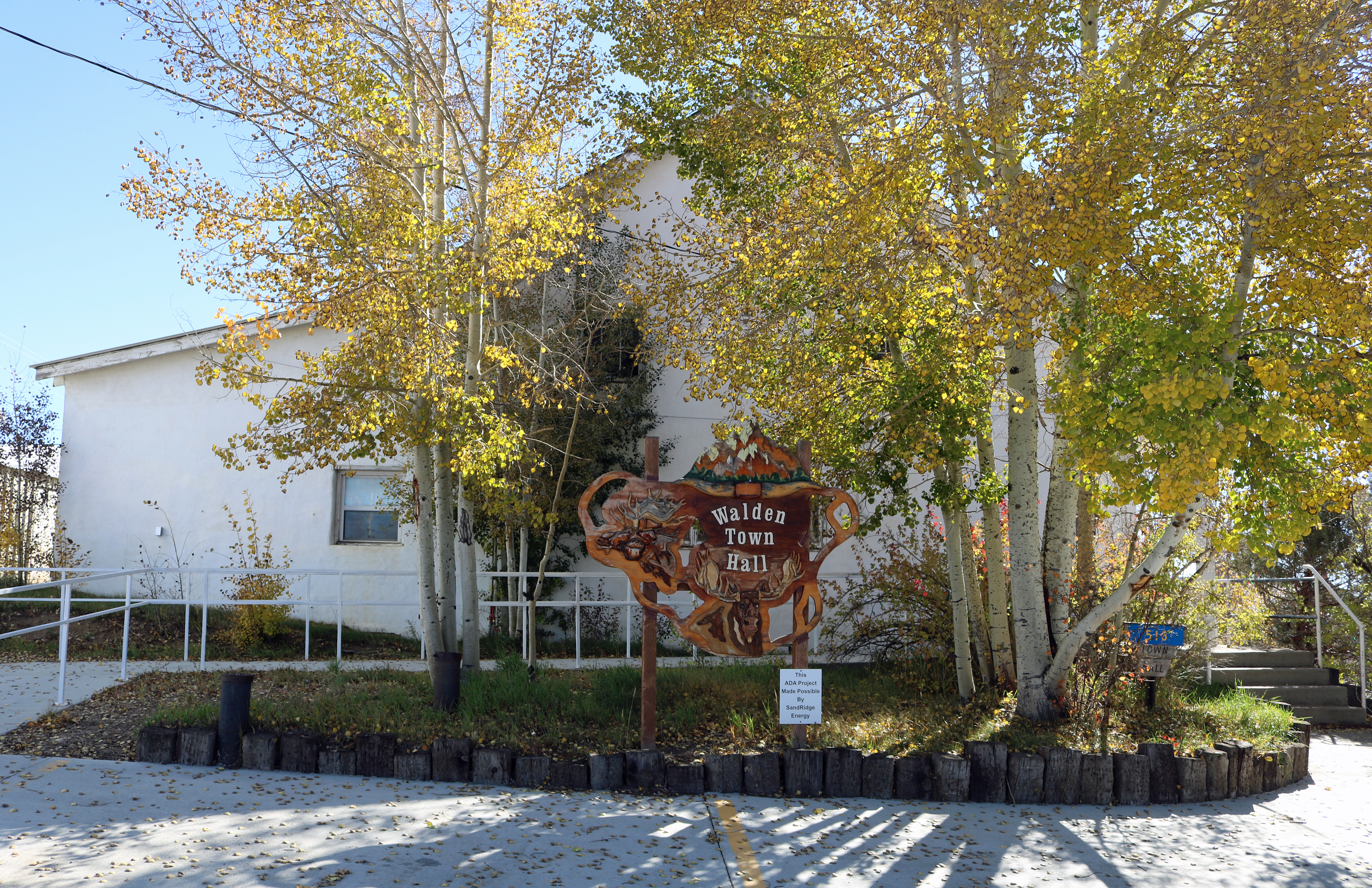
Walden Town Hall, October 2022

The median income for a household in the town was $29,313, and the median income for a family was $34,423. Males had a median income of $31,111 versus $18,611 for females. The per capita income for the town was $16,964. About 14.2% of families and 20.3% of the population were below the poverty line, including 35.3% of those under age 18 and 8.8% of those age 65 or over.

The 2010 census shows that the population decreased to 608 individuals, 377 households, and 291 families residing in the town. There were 318 males, 290 females, 116 individuals under the age of 18, and 492 individuals over the age of 18, with a distribution as follows: 20-24=29, 25-34=63, 35-49=121, 50-64=151, and 65 and over=113. Ethnically, 82 individuals are Hispanic or Latino and 526 individuals are Non-Hispanic or Latino. The race distribution is as follows: 554 White, 0 African American, 0 Asian, 8 American Indian and Alaska Native, 0 Native Hawaiian and Pacific Islander, 34 Other, and 12 who identified by two or more races.

== Geography ==
According to the United States Census Bureau, the town has a total area of 0.3 square miles (0.78 km^{2}), all of it land. The town has declared itself the moose viewing capital of Colorado.

=== Climate ===
Due to its elevation, Walden has a semi-arid climate (BSk), closely bordering on a subalpine climate (Köppen climate classification Dfc). The hottest temperature recorded in Walden was 94 °F (34 °C) on July 6, 1989, August 1, 2000 and July 15, 2002, while the coldest temperature recorded was −48 °F (−44 °C) on January 12, 1963, February 2, 2011 and January 6, 2017.

Climate data for Walden, Colorado, 1991–2020 normals, extremes 1897–present
Month	Jan	Feb	Mar	Apr	May	Jun	Jul	Aug	Sep	Oct	Nov	Dec	Year
Record high °F (°C)	56 (13)	54 (12)	70 (21)	74 (23)	84 (29)	92 (33)	94 (34)	94 (34)	89 (32)	78 (26)	66 (19)	58 (14)	94 (34)
Mean maximum °F (°C)	43.6 (6.4)	45.9 (7.7)	56.5 (13.6)	66.2 (19.0)	75.4 (24.1)	82.1 (27.8)	86.9 (30.5)	85.0 (29.4)	80.2 (26.8)	70.8 (21.6)	57.1 (13.9)	46.4 (8.0)	86.9 (30.5)
Mean daily maximum °F (°C)	26.7 (−2.9)	29.6 (−1.3)	38.6 (3.7)	47.4 (8.6)	58.1 (14.5)	68.8 (20.4)	76.1 (24.5)	74.1 (23.4)	66.4 (19.1)	52.9 (11.6)	38.3 (3.5)	27.7 (−2.4)	50.4 (10.2)
Daily mean °F (°C)	14.3 (−9.8)	17.0 (−8.3)	25.8 (−3.4)	33.7 (0.9)	42.9 (6.1)	51.7 (10.9)	57.3 (14.1)	55.2 (12.9)	47.9 (8.8)	36.8 (2.7)	25.1 (−3.8)	15.4 (−9.2)	35.3 (1.8)
Mean daily minimum °F (°C)	1.9 (−16.7)	4.4 (−15.3)	13.1 (−10.5)	20.0 (−6.7)	27.6 (−2.4)	34.5 (1.4)	38.4 (3.6)	36.3 (2.4)	29.4 (−1.4)	20.7 (−6.3)	11.8 (−11.2)	3.2 (−16.0)	20.1 (−6.6)
Mean minimum °F (°C)	−22.2 (−30.1)	−19.7 (−28.7)	−8.4 (−22.4)	4.9 (−15.1)	15.5 (−9.2)	27.5 (−2.5)	32.4 (0.2)	28.9 (−1.7)	17.4 (−8.1)	2.1 (−16.6)	−10.4 (−23.6)	−21.2 (−29.6)	−28.9 (−33.8)
Record low °F (°C)	−48 (−44)	−48 (−44)	−34 (−37)	−16 (−27)	2 (−17)	17 (−8)	21 (−6)	19 (−7)	5 (−15)	−28 (−33)	−32 (−36)	−39 (−39)	−48 (−44)
Average precipitation inches (mm)	0.58 (15)	0.64 (16)	0.72 (18)	1.14 (29)	1.53 (39)	1.21 (31)	1.34 (34)	1.27 (32)	1.34 (34)	0.98 (25)	0.75 (19)	0.62 (16)	12.12 (308)
Average snowfall inches (cm)	9.3 (24)	9.0 (23)	7.7 (20)	10.1 (26)	3.8 (9.7)	0.5 (1.3)	0.0 (0.0)	0.0 (0.0)	1.0 (2.5)	6.0 (15)	9.5 (24)	10.2 (26)	67.1 (171.5)
Average precipitation days (≥ 0.01 in)	7.9	8.1	7.3	9.4	10.3	7.7	9.9	10.6	8.3	7.3	7.8	8.3	102.9
Average snowy days (≥ 0.1 in)	8.3	8.5	6.2	6.7	2.6	0.3	0.0	0.0	0.7	3.6	7.3	8.8	53.0
Source 1: NOAA
Source 2: National Weather Service

== Transportation ==
- SH 14 State Highway 14
- SH 125 State Highway 125

Transportation OATS (Older Americans Transport Service) provides seniors with transportation to Laramie, Wyoming or Steamboat Springs, CO and to Denver International Airport.

== See also ==
- List of municipalities in Colorado
