= Mount Stratus =

Mountain in the state of Colorado

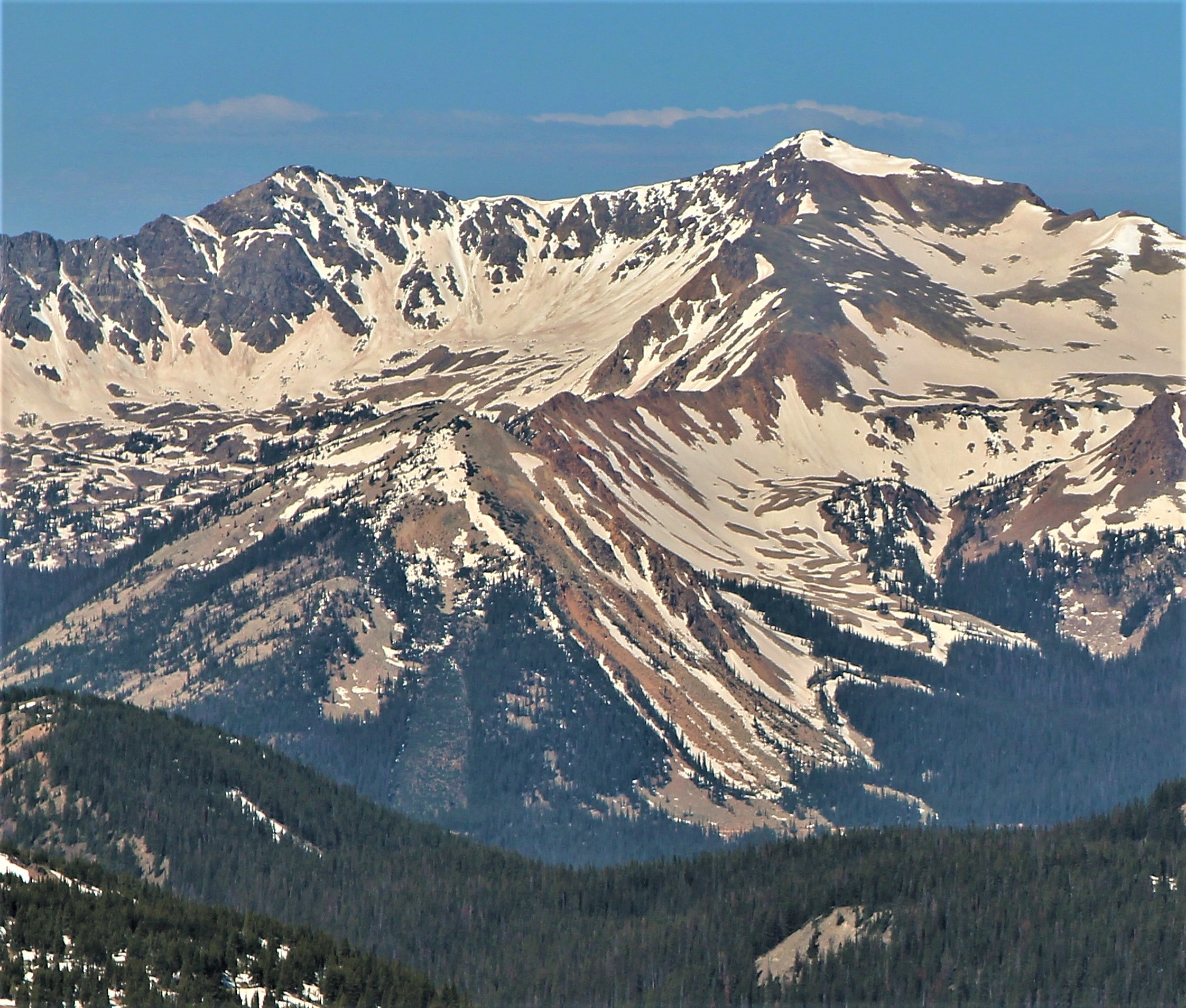
- Northeast aspect of Mount Stratus at upper left (Mount Nimbus to the right)

Highest point
- Elevation: 12,534 ft (3,820 m)
- Prominence: 139 ft (42 m)
- Parent peak: Mount Nimbus (12,721 ft)
- Isolation: 0.44 mi (0.71 km)
- Coordinates: 40°23′25″N 105°54′13″W

Naming
- Etymology: Stratus cloud

Geography
- Location within Colorado Location within the United States
- Country: United States
- State: Colorado
- County: Grand County
- Protected area: Rocky Mountain National Park; Never Summer Wilderness
- Parent range: Rocky Mountains; Never Summer Mountains
- Topo map: USGS Mount Richthofen

Geology
- Rock type(s): Biotite Gneiss and Schist

Climbing
- Easiest route: class 2 West slope or North ridge

Mount Stratus is a 12,534-foot-elevation (3,820-meter) mountain summit in Grand County, Colorado, United States.

== Description ==
Mount Stratus is the ninth-highest peak of the Never Summer Mountains which are a subrange of the Rocky Mountains. The mountain is situated on the western boundary of Rocky Mountain National Park and is visible from Trail Ridge Road within the park. The west side of the peak is in the Never Summer Wilderness which is managed by Arapaho National Forest. Precipitation runoff from the mountain's slopes drains into tributaries of the Colorado River except for a portion which is diverted by the Grand Ditch. Topographic relief is significant as the summit rises 3,600 feet (1,100 meters) above the Kawuneeche Valley in 2.5 miles (4.0 km) and 1,700 feet (520 meters) above Baker Gulch in three-quarters of a mile. An ascent of the peak involves hiking 12.8 miles (20.6 km) round-trip with 3,555 feet (1,084 m) of elevation gain.

== Etymology ==
The mountain's toponym has been officially adopted by the United States Board on Geographic Names. In 1914, James Grafton Rogers named Mount Cirrus, Mount Nimbus, and Mount Cumulus for different types of common clouds, but he did not name Mt. Stratus, it was added later.

== Climate ==
According to the Köppen climate classification system, Mount Stratus is located in an alpine subarctic climate zone with cold, snowy winters, and cool to warm summers. Due to its altitude, it receives precipitation all year, as snow in winter, and as thunderstorms in summer, with a dry period in late spring.

== See also ==
- List of peaks in Rocky Mountain National Park
- Mountains of Grand County, Colorado

== Gallery ==
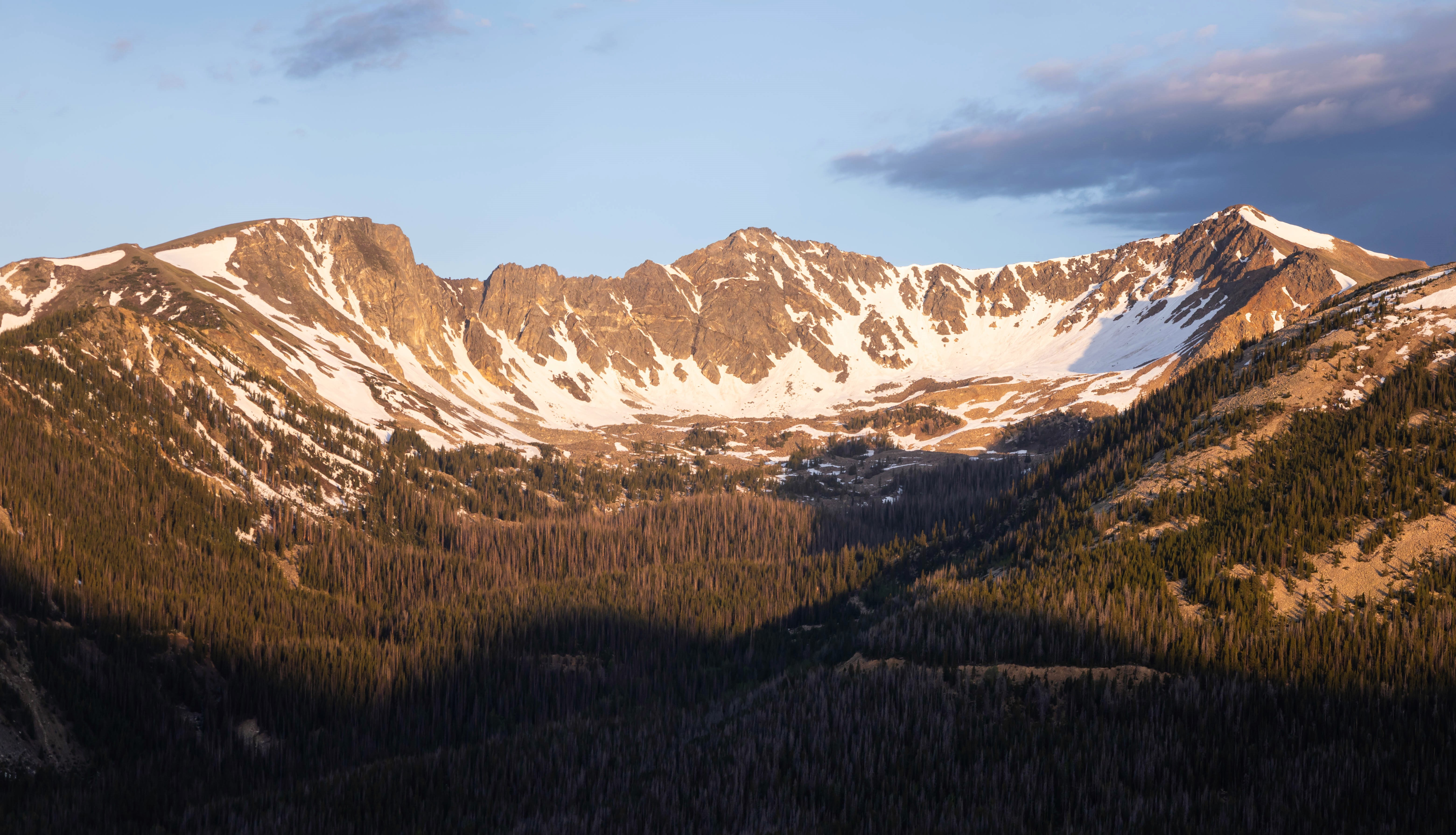
Green Knoll (left), Mount Stratus (center), Mount Nimbus (right).

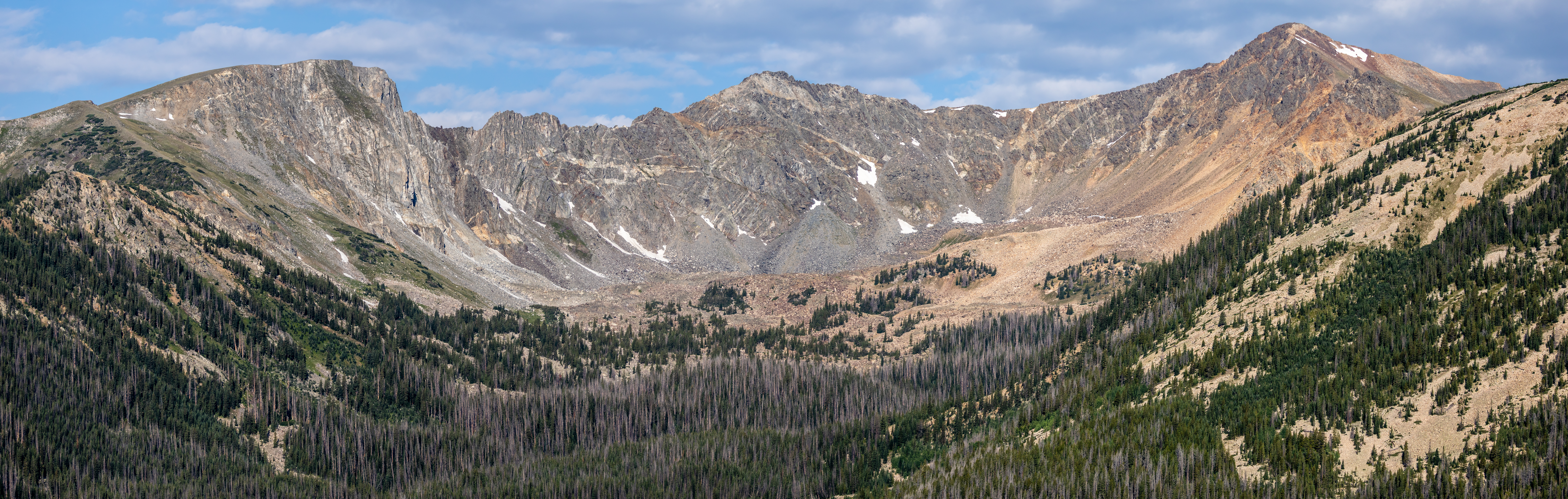
Green Knoll (left), Mount Stratus (center), Mount Nimbus (right)

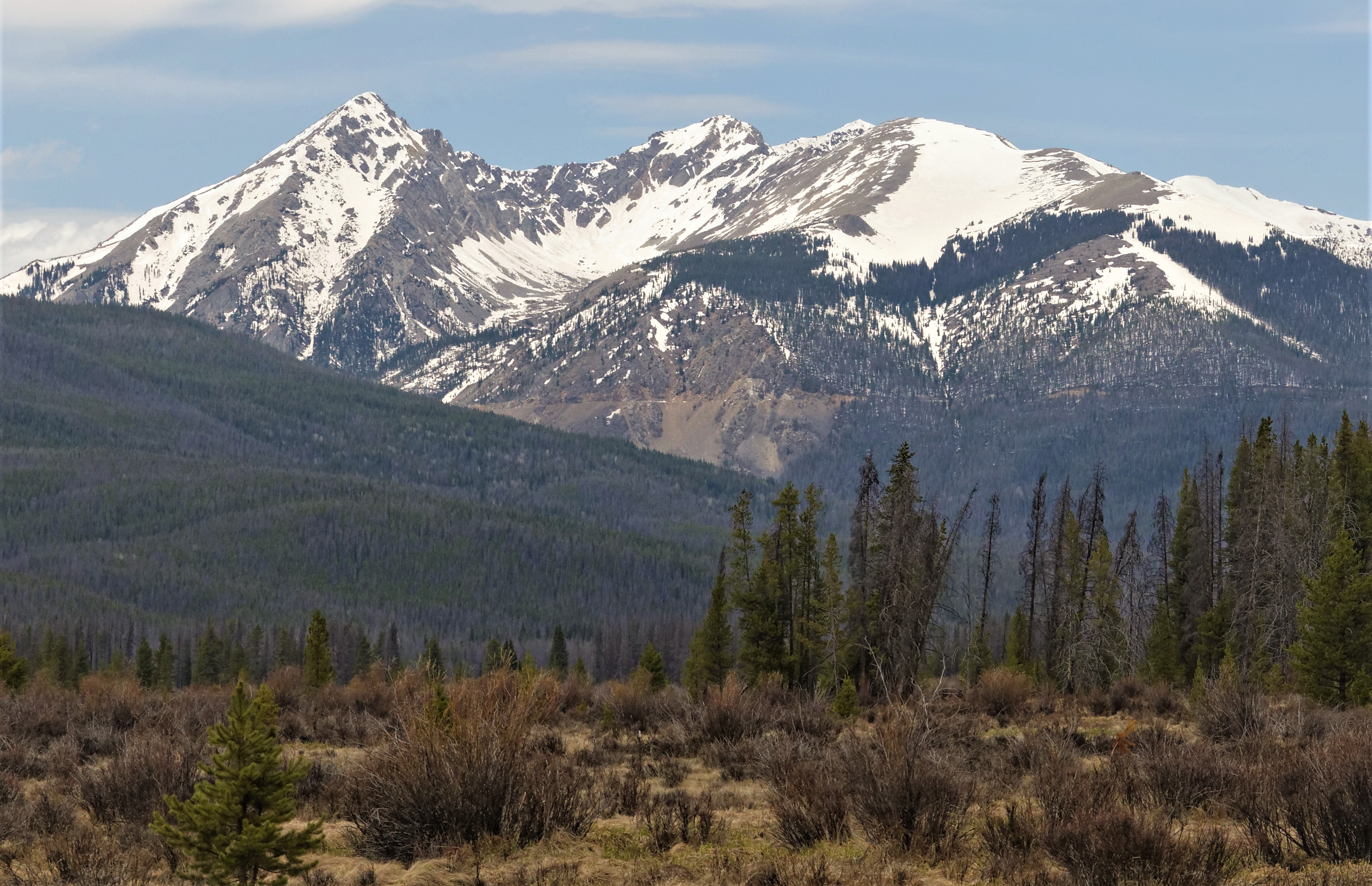
Baker Mountain (left), Mount Stratus (center), Green Knoll (right)

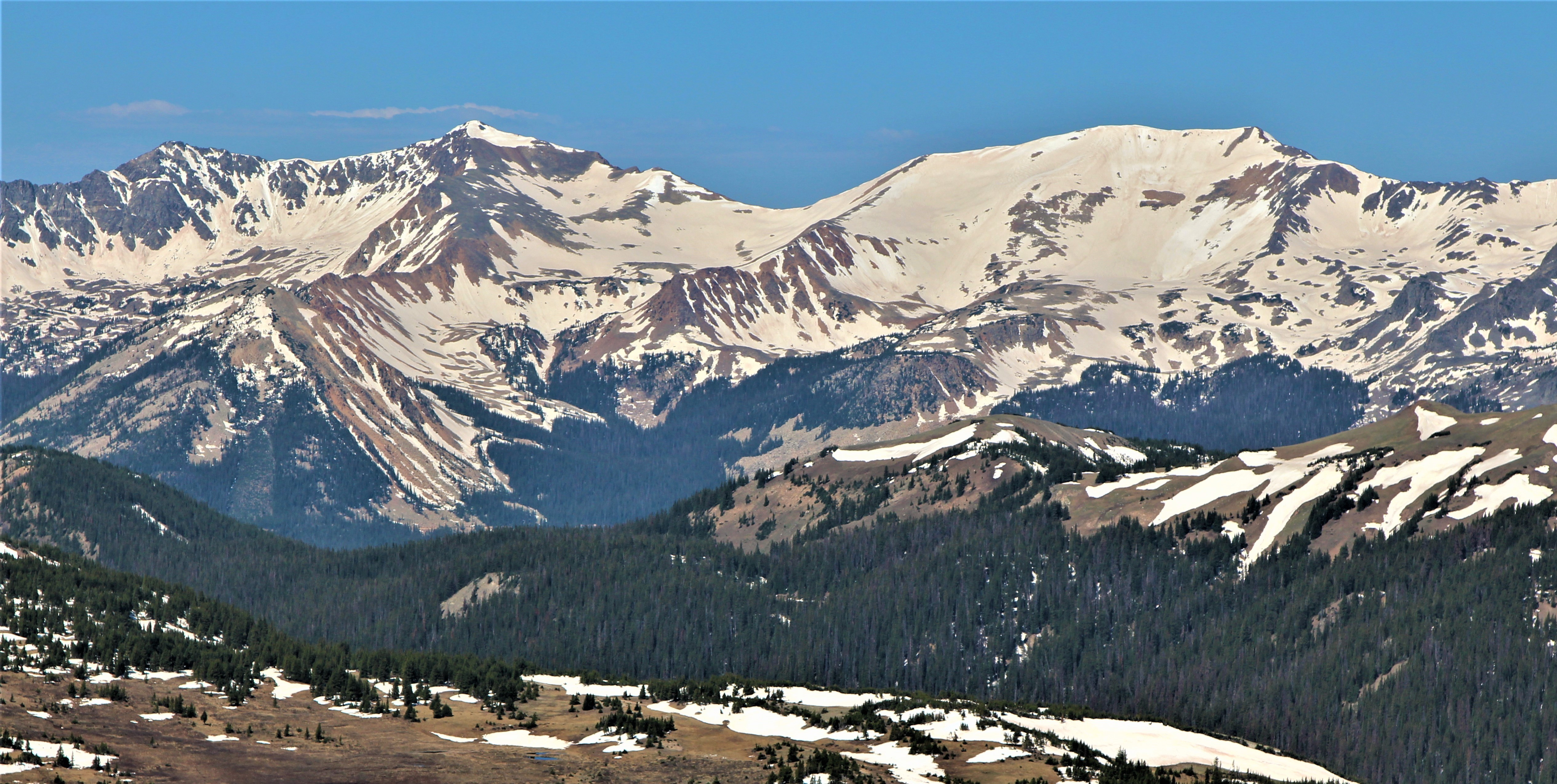
Mt. Stratus (left), Mt. Nimbus, and Mt. Cumulus (right)

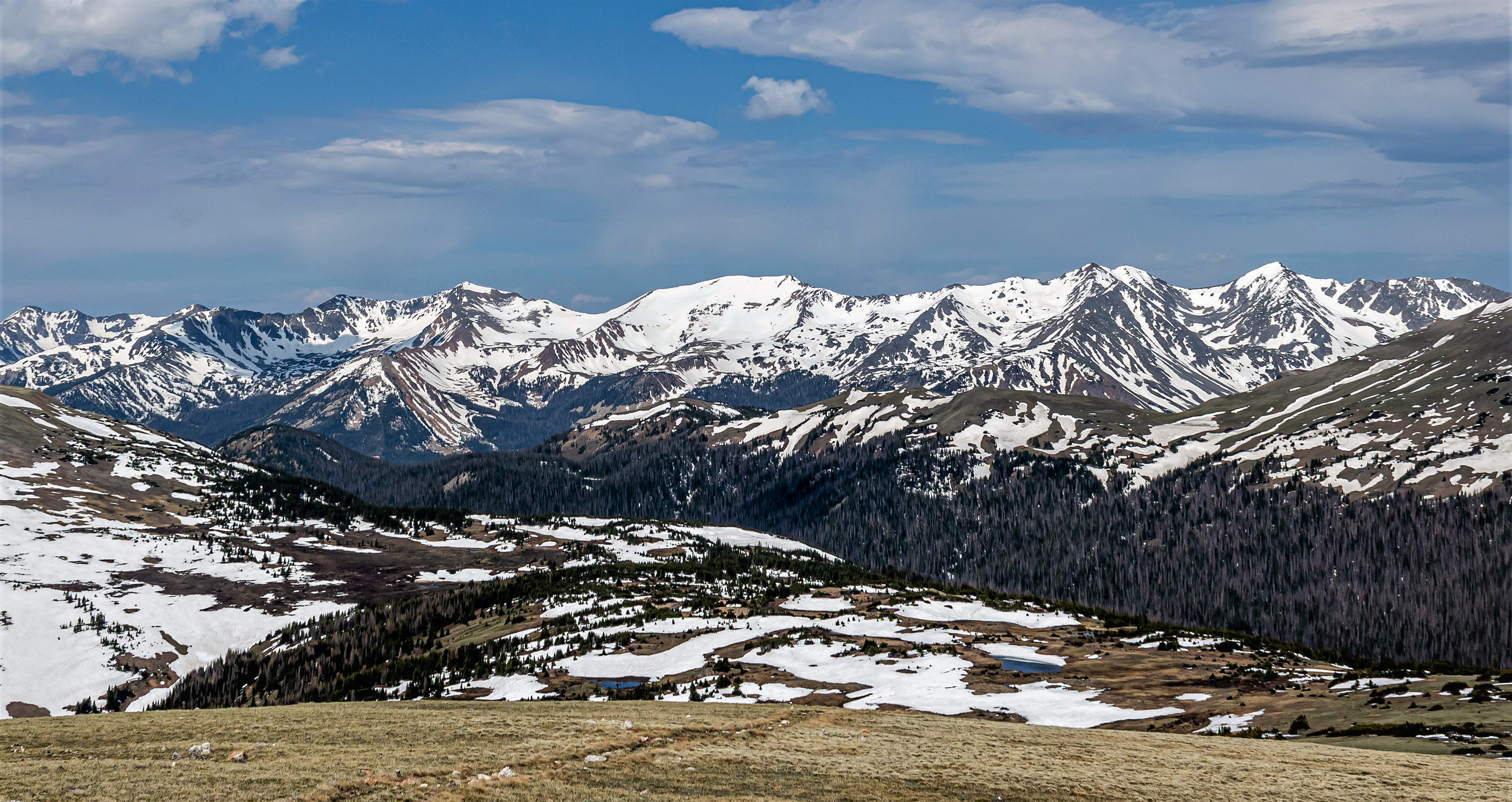
Never Summer Mountains viewed from Trail Ridge Road. Left to rightːMt. Stratus, Mt. Nimbus, Mt. Cumulus (centered), Howard Mountain, Mt. Cirrus
