= Mount Cumulus =

Mountain in the state of Colorado

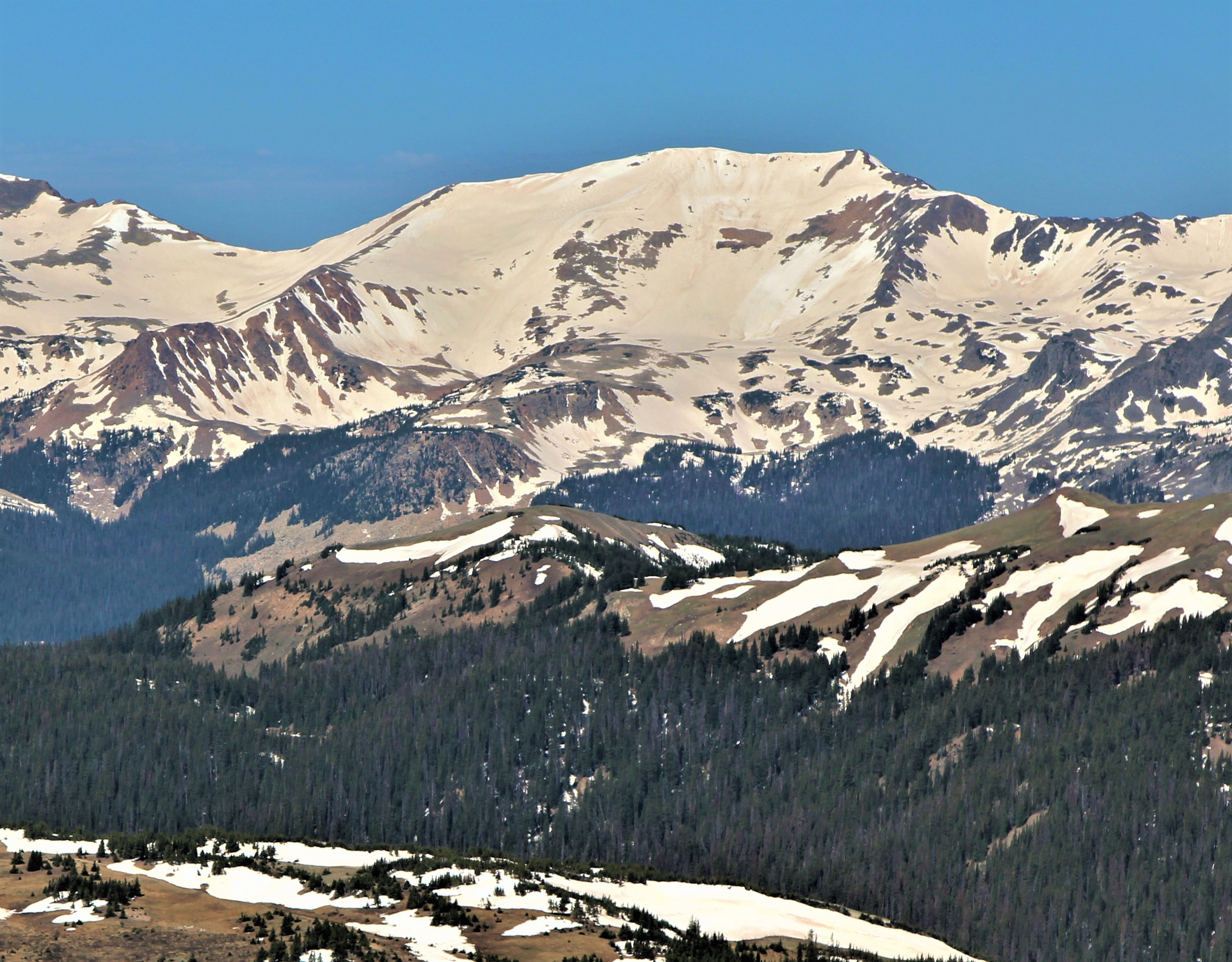
- East aspect

Highest point
- Elevation: 12,729 ft (3,880 m)
- Prominence: 400 ft (122 m)
- Parent peak: Howard Mountain (12,826 ft)
- Isolation: 0.97 mi (1.56 km)
- Coordinates: 40°24′37″N 105°54′08″W

Naming
- Etymology: Cumulus cloud

Geography
- Location within Colorado Location within the United States
- Country: United States
- State: Colorado
- County: Grand County / Jackson County
- Protected area: Rocky Mountain National Park; Never Summer Wilderness
- Parent range: Rocky Mountains; Never Summer Mountains
- Topo map: USGS Mount Richthofen

Geology
- Rock age: Miocene
- Rock type: Granite

Climbing
- Easiest route: East slope class 2

Mount Cumulus is a 12,729-foot-elevation (3,880-meter) mountain summit in Colorado, United States.

== Description ==
Mount Cumulus is situated on the Continental Divide along the boundary shared by Grand County and Jackson County. It is the fourth-highest peak of the Never Summer Mountains which are a subrange of the Rocky Mountains. The mountain is situated on the western boundary of Rocky Mountain National Park and is visible from Trail Ridge Road within the park. The west side of the peak is in the Never Summer Wilderness, on land managed by Medicine Bow–Routt National Forest. Precipitation runoff from the mountain's west slope drains into headwaters of the South Fork Michigan River and the east slope drains into the Colorado River except a portion which is diverted by the Grand Ditch. The counterintuitive direction of water flow is because the Continental Divide forms a loop in this area, whereby the peak's west slope runoff flows to the Atlantic Ocean and the east slope to the Pacific. Topographic relief is significant as the summit rises 3,700 feet (1,100 meters) above the Kawuneeche Valley in three miles (4.8 km) and over 2,300 feet (700 meters) above the South Fork Michigan River in one mile (1.6 km).

== Etymology ==
The mountain's toponym was applied in 1914 by James Grafton Rogers, and was officially adopted in 1932 by the United States Board on Geographic Names. Rogers also named Mount Cirrus and Mount Nimbus, with the three names referring to different types of common clouds. As President of the Colorado Geographic Society, Chairman of the Colorado Geographic Board, and President of the American Alpine Club, Rogers participated in naming many of Colorado's mountains.

== Climate ==
According to the Köppen climate classification system, Mount Cumulus is located in an alpine subarctic climate zone with cold, snowy winters, and cool to warm summers. Due to its altitude, it receives precipitation all year, as snow in winter, and as thunderstorms in summer, with a dry period in late spring.

== See also ==
- List of peaks in Rocky Mountain National Park
- Mountains of Grand County, Colorado
- Mountains of Jackson County, Colorado

== Gallery ==
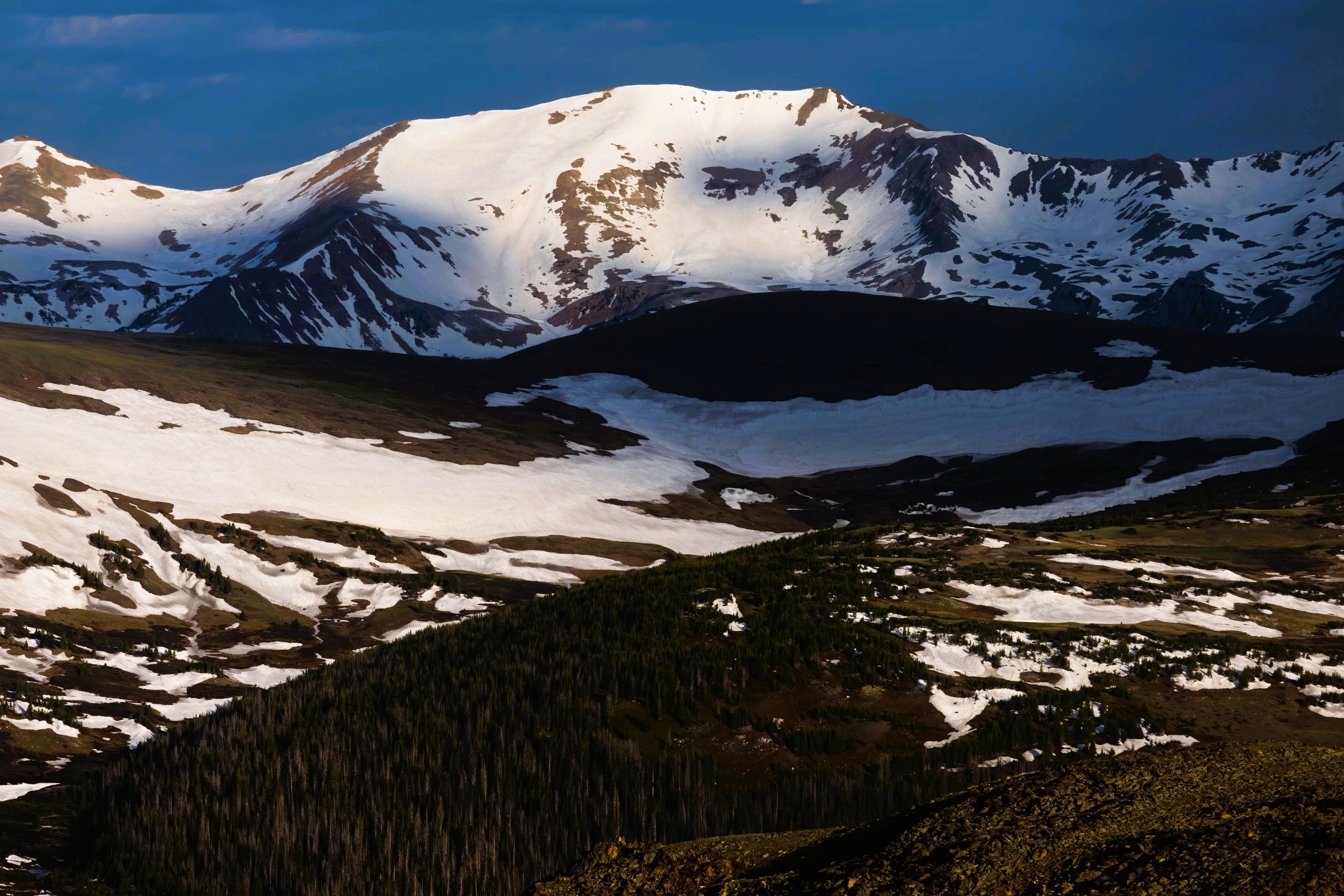

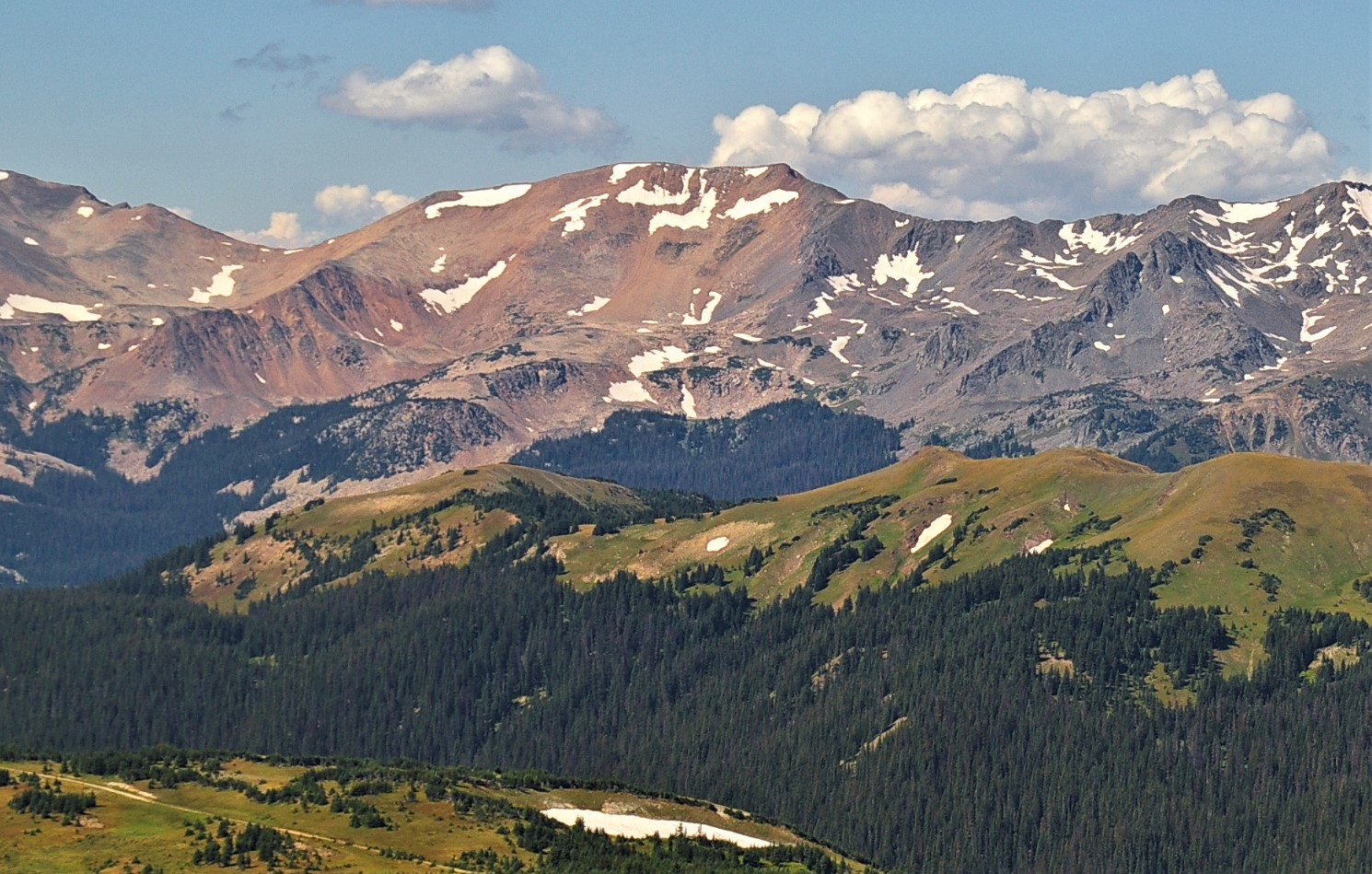
Mt. Cumulus, with cumulus clouds

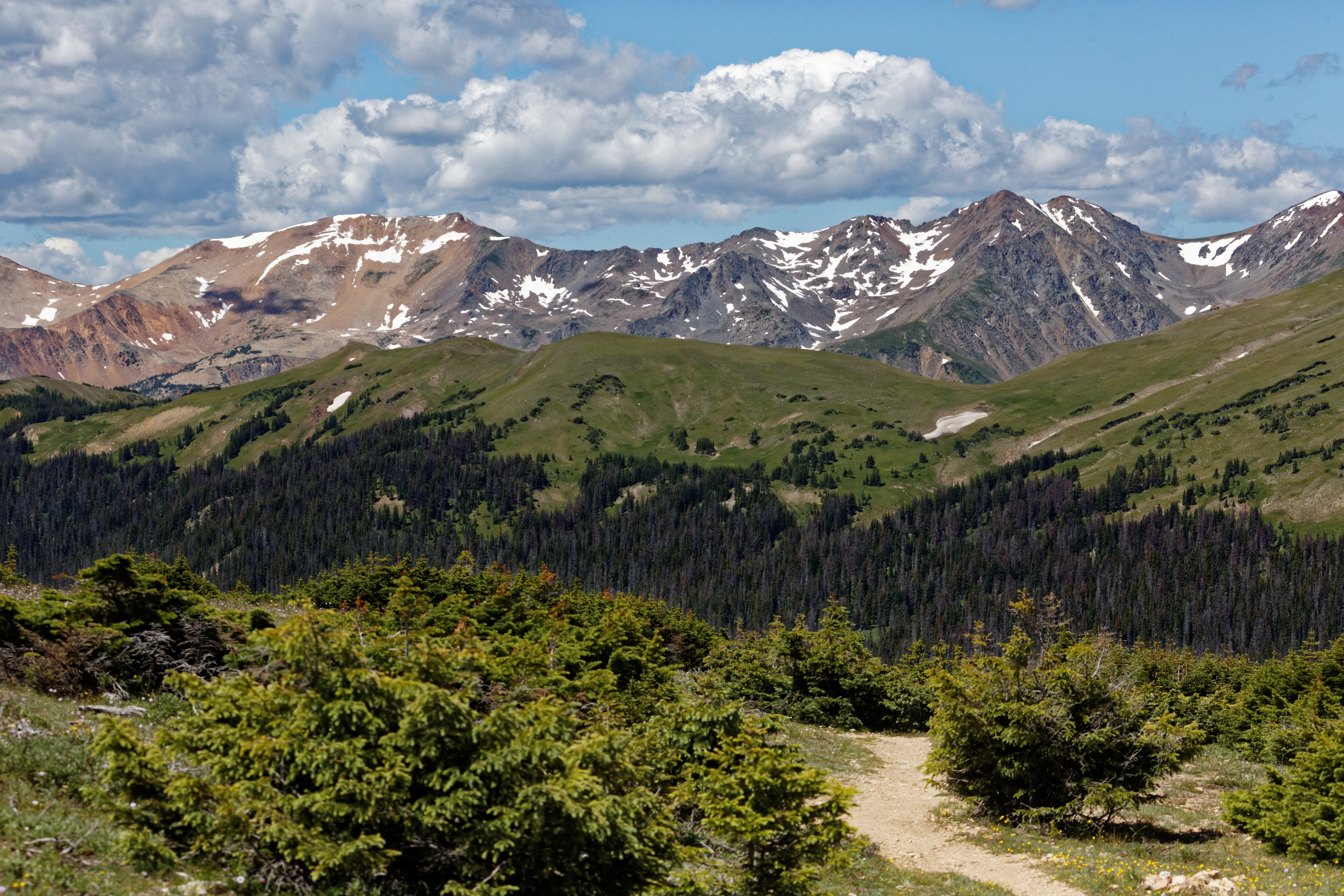
Mt. Cumulus (left), Howard Mountain (right)
