= Lead Mountain =

Lead Mountain may refer to:

- Lead Mountain (Custer County, Colorado)
- Lead Mountain (Grand County, Colorado)
- Lead Mountain (Maine)
