= Mount Cirrus =

Mountain in the state of Colorado

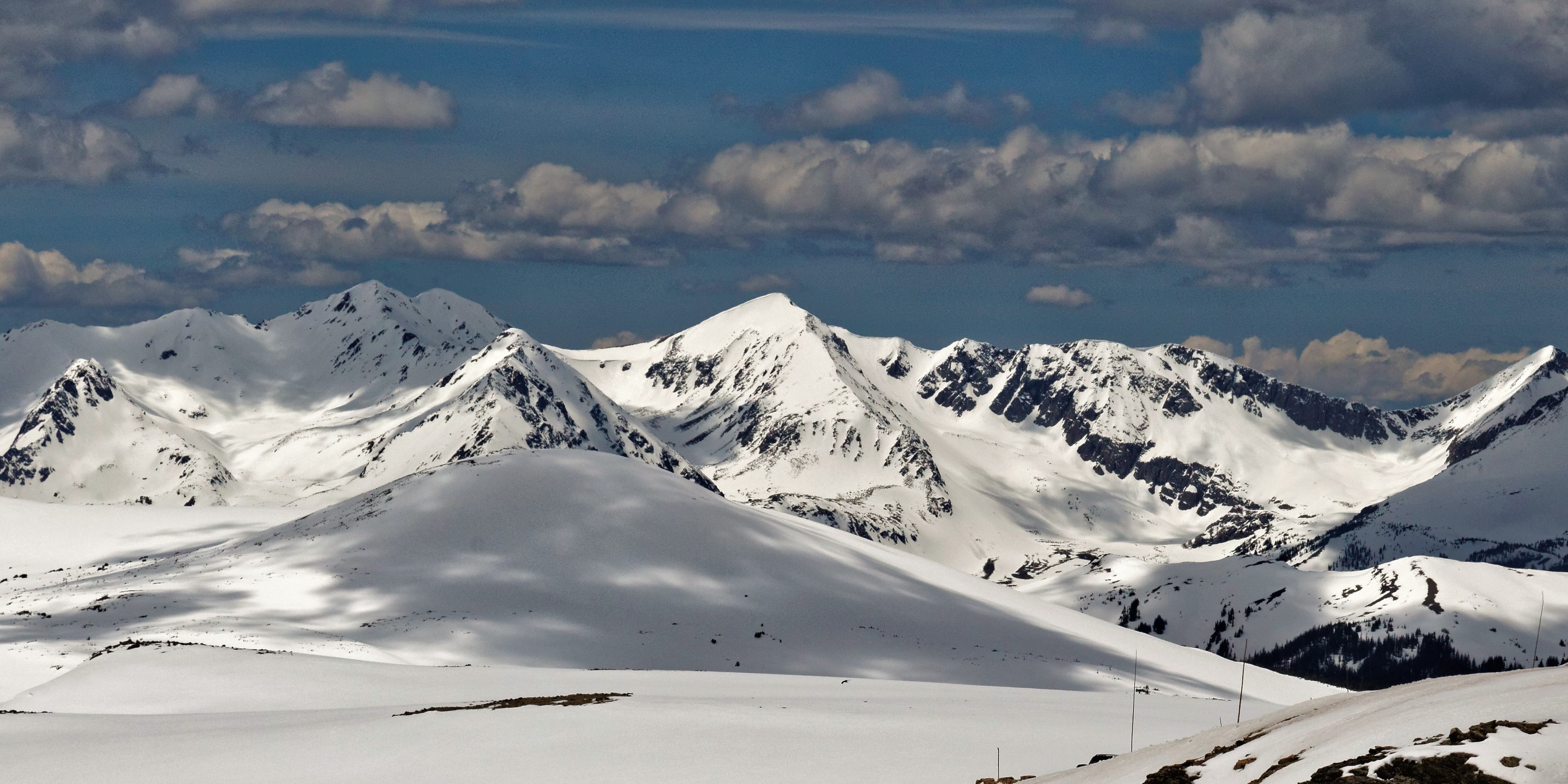
- East aspect, centered, from Trail Ridge Road

Highest point
- Elevation: 12,808 ft (3,904 m)
- Prominence: 400 ft (122 m)
- Parent peak: Howard Mountain (12,826 ft)
- Isolation: 0.56 mi (0.90 km)
- Coordinates: 40°26′05″N 105°54′07″W

Naming
- Etymology: Cirrus cloud

Geography
- Location within Colorado Location within the United States
- Country: United States
- State: Colorado
- County: Grand County / Jackson County
- Protected area: Rocky Mountain National Park; Never Summer Wilderness
- Parent range: Rocky Mountains; Never Summer Mountains
- Topo map: USGS Mount Richthofen

Geology
- Rock type(s): shale and granodiorite

Climbing
- Easiest route: Southwest Ridge class 2

Mount Cirrus is a 12,808-foot-elevation (3,904-meter) mountain summit in Colorado, United States.

== Description ==
Mount Cirrus is situated on the Continental Divide along the boundary shared by Grand County and Jackson County. It is the third-highest peak of the Never Summer Mountains which are a subrange of the Rocky Mountains. The mountain is situated on the western boundary of Rocky Mountain National Park and is visible from Trail Ridge Road within the park. The west side of the peak is in the Never Summer Wilderness, on land managed by Medicine Bow–Routt National Forest. Precipitation runoff from the mountain's west slope drains into tributaries of the Michigan River and the east slope drains into headwaters of the Colorado River except a portion which is diverted by the Grand Ditch. The counterintuitive direction of water flow is because the Continental Divide forms a loop in this area, whereby the peak's west slope runoff flows to the Atlantic Ocean and the east slope to the Pacific. Topographic relief is significant as the summit rises 3,600 feet (1,100 meters) above the Colorado River in three miles (4.8 km) and 2,600 feet (790 meters) above the South Fork Michigan River in one mile (1.6 km).

== Etymology ==
The mountain's toponym was applied in 1914 by James Grafton Rogers, and was officially adopted in 1932 by the United States Board on Geographic Names. Rogers also named Mount Cumulus and Mount Nimbus, with the three names referring to different types of common clouds. As President of the Colorado Geographic Society, Chairman of the Colorado Geographic Board, and President of the American Alpine Club, Rogers participated in naming many of Colorado's mountains. The north ridge of Cirrus, officially named Hart Ridge, is named in remembrance of Eldon Charles Hart, Jr., of the Kansas Air National Guard, who was killed in the crash of his plane on this ridge on January 30, 1967, at age 26.

== Climate ==
According to the Köppen climate classification system, Mount Cirrus is located in an alpine subarctic climate zone with cold, snowy winters, and cool to warm summers. Due to its altitude, it receives precipitation all year, as snow in winter, and as thunderstorms in summer, with a dry period in late spring.

== See also ==
- List of peaks in Rocky Mountain National Park
- Never Summer Mountains
- Mountains of Grand County, Colorado
- Mountains of Jackson County, Colorado

== Gallery ==
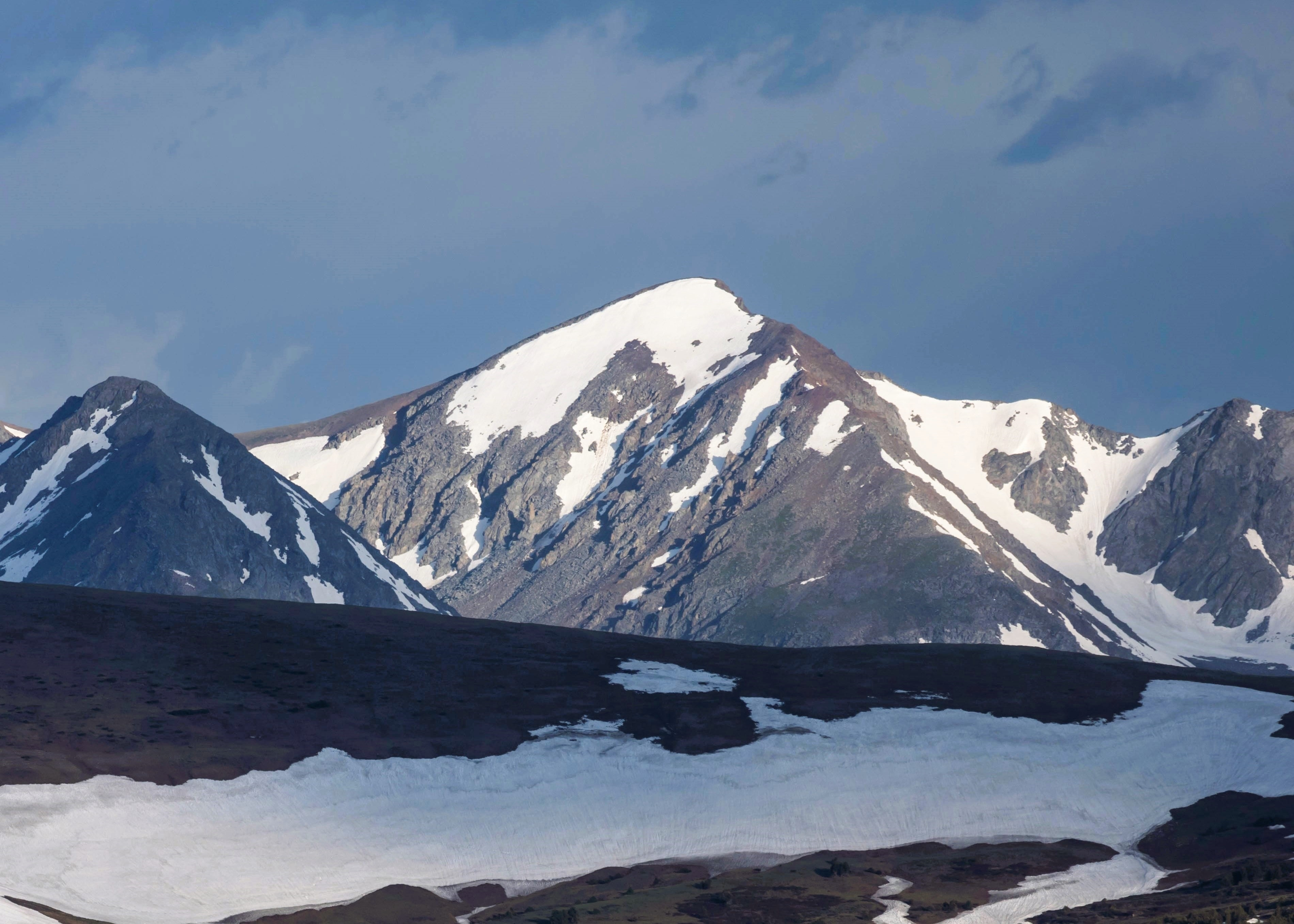
Mt. Cirrus

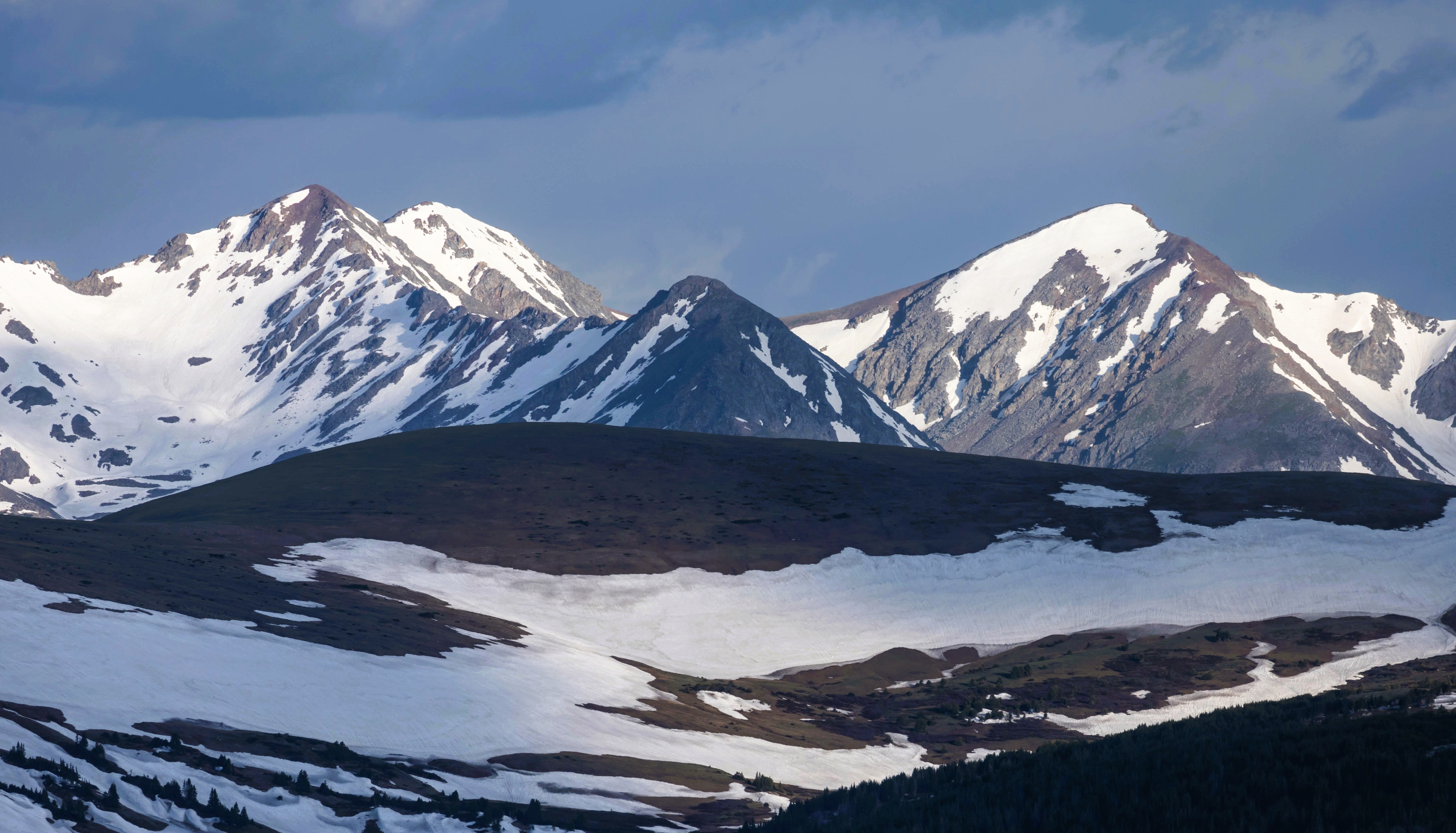
Howard Mountain (left) and Mt. Cirrus (right)

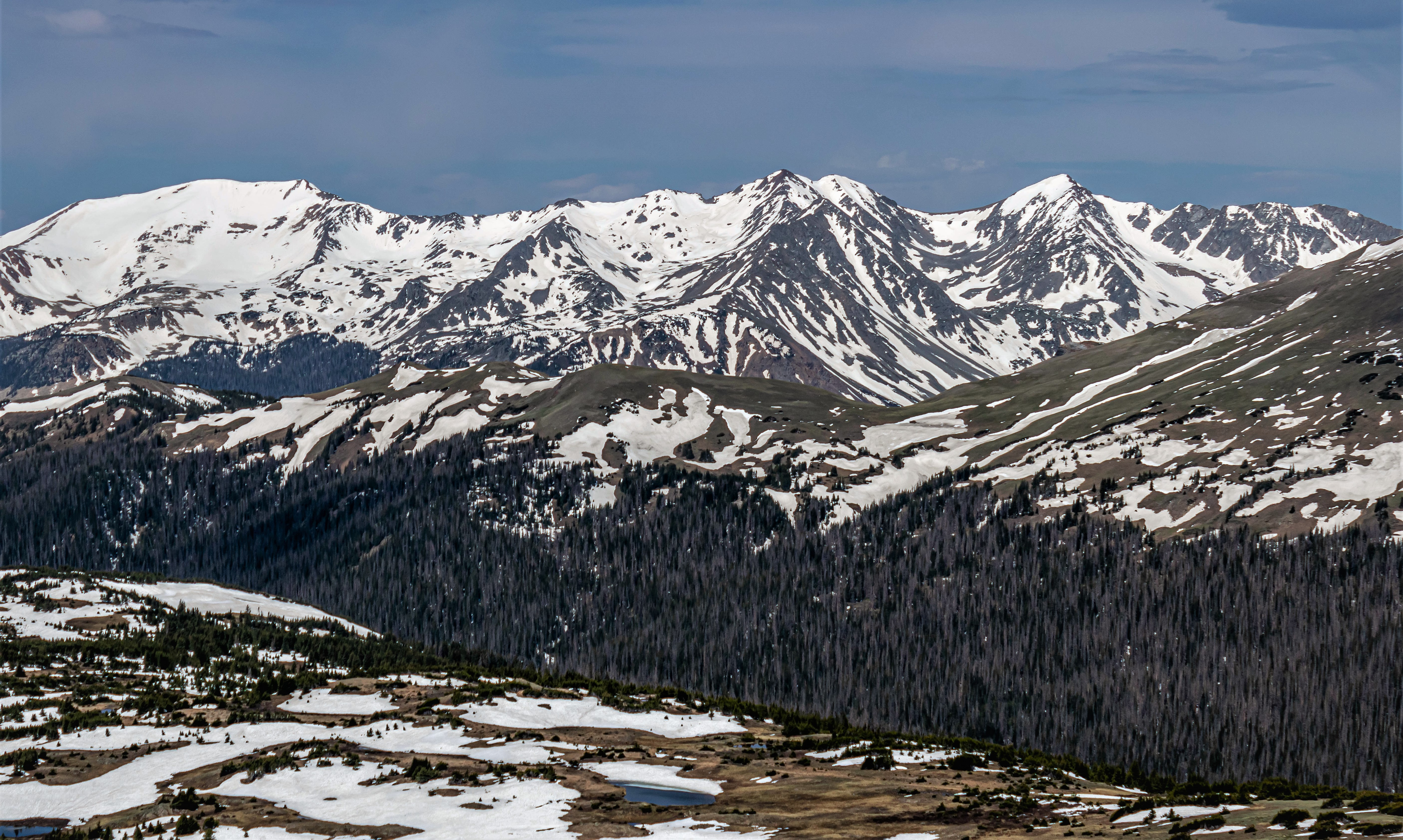
Never Summer Mountains. Mount Cumulus (left), Howard Mountain (center), and Mount Cirrus (right).
