= Mount Nimbus =

Mountain in the state of Colorado

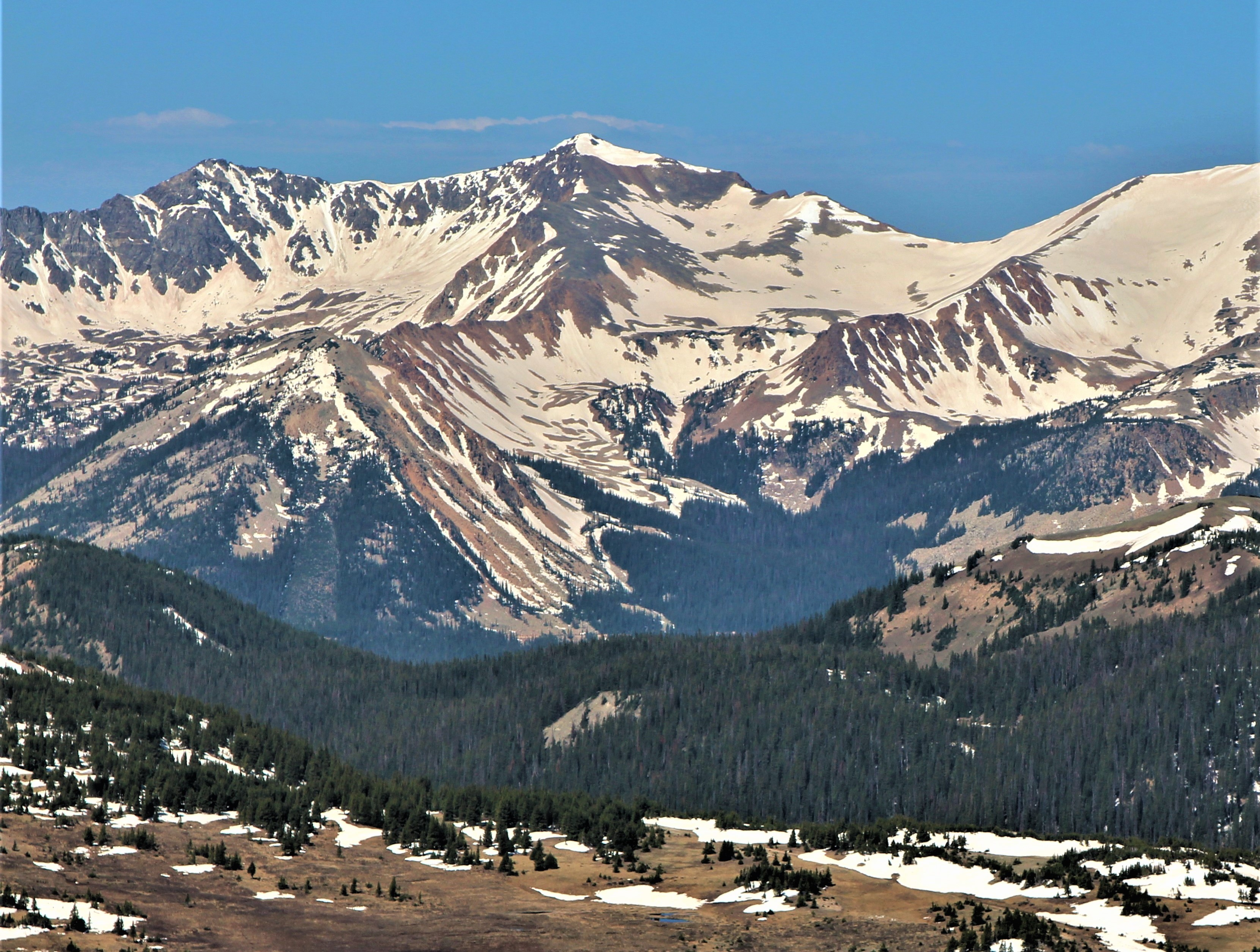
- East aspect

Highest point
- Elevation: 12,721 ft (3,877 m)
- Prominence: 623 ft (190 m)
- Parent peak: Mount Cumulus (12,729 ft)
- Isolation: 1.14 mi (1.83 km)
- Coordinates: 40°23′48″N 105°54′15″W

Naming
- Etymology: Nimbus cloud

Geography
- Location within Colorado Location within the United States
- Country: United States
- State: Colorado
- County: Grand County
- Protected area: Rocky Mountain National Park; Never Summer Wilderness
- Parent range: Rocky Mountains; Never Summer Mountains
- Topo map: USGS Mount Richthofen

Geology
- Rock type(s): Granite and Gneiss

Climbing
- Easiest route: class 2

Mount Nimbus is a 12,721-foot-elevation (3,877-meter) mountain summit in Grand County, Colorado, United States.

== Description ==
Mount Nimbus is set along the Continental Divide and is the fifth-highest peak of the Never Summer Mountains which are a subrange of the Rocky Mountains. The mountain is situated on the western boundary of Rocky Mountain National Park and is visible from Trail Ridge Road within the park. The west side of the peak is in the Never Summer Wilderness, on land managed by Arapaho National Forest. Precipitation runoff from the mountain's lower northwest slope drains into headwaters of the South Fork Michigan River and all other slopes drain into tributaries of the Colorado River except a portion which is diverted by the Grand Ditch. Topographic relief is significant as the summit rises 3,700 feet (1,100 meters) above the Kawuneeche Valley in three miles (4.8 km) and 1,700 feet (520 meters) above Baker Gulch in one-half mile.

== Etymology ==
The mountain's toponym was applied in 1914 by James Grafton Rogers, and was officially adopted in 1932 by the United States Board on Geographic Names. Rogers also named Mount Cirrus and Mount Cumulus, with the three names referring to different types of common clouds. As President of the Colorado Geographic Society, Chairman of the Colorado Geographic Board, and President of the American Alpine Club, Rogers participated in naming many of Colorado's mountains. He also drafted legislation to create Rocky Mountain National Park.

== Climate ==
According to the Köppen climate classification system, Mount Nimbus is located in an alpine subarctic climate zone with cold, snowy winters, and cool to warm summers. Due to its altitude, it receives precipitation all year, as snow in winter, and as thunderstorms in summer, with a dry period in late spring.

== Gallery ==
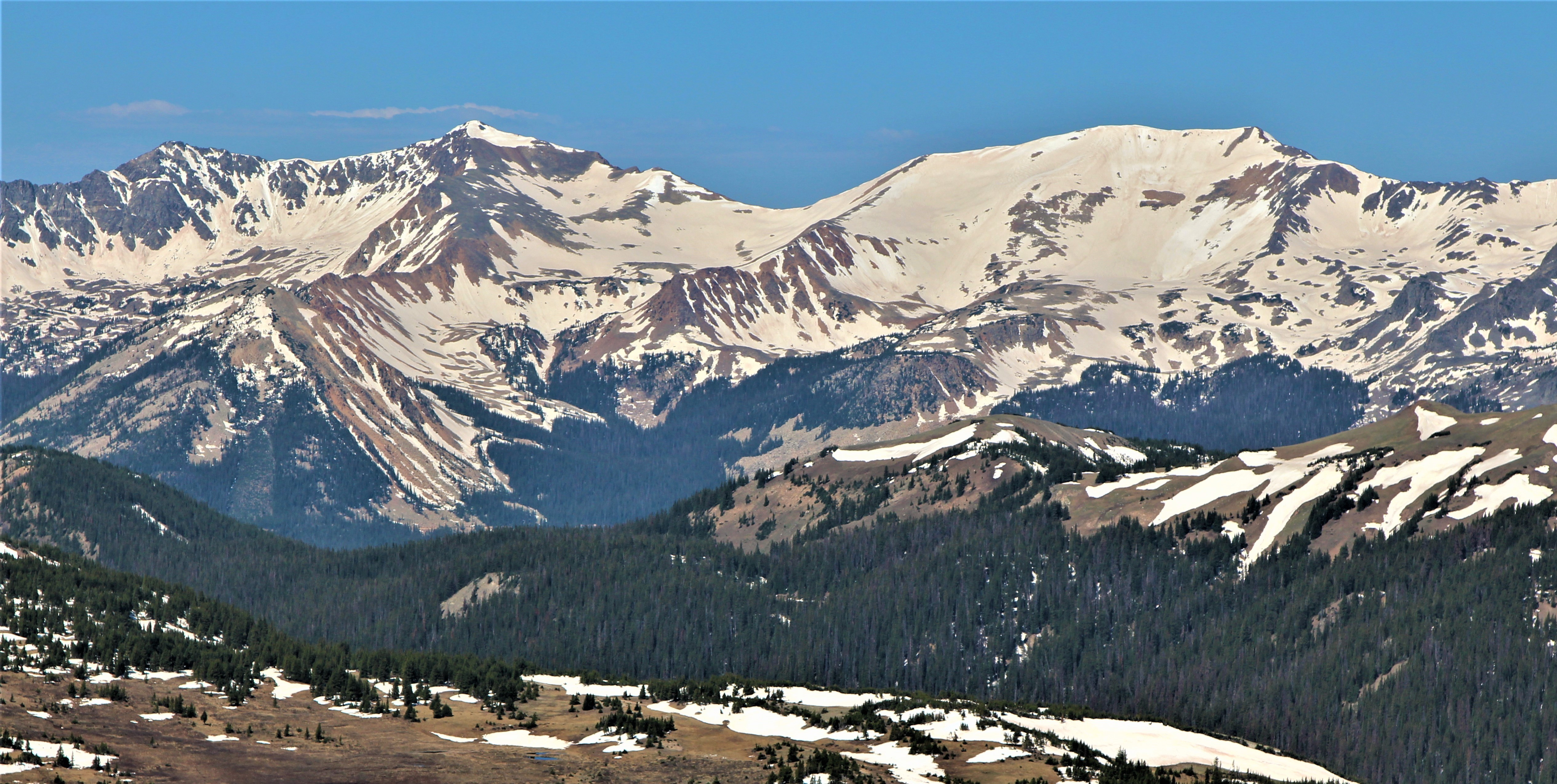
Mt. Nimbus (left) and Mt. Cumulus (right)

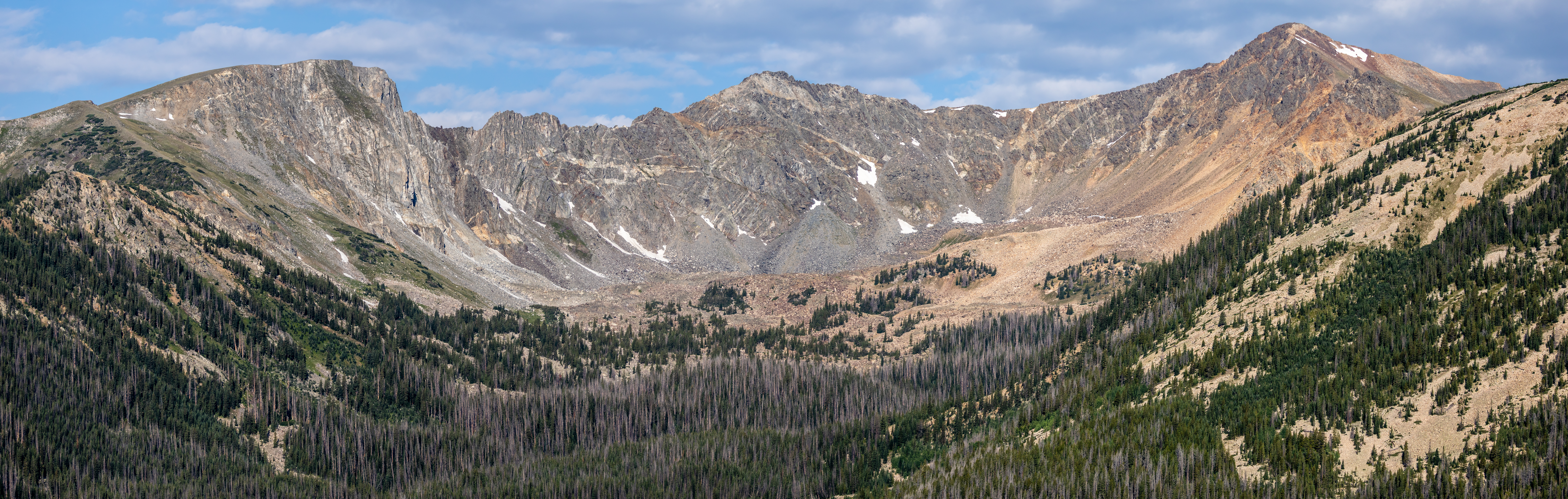
Green Knoll (left), Mount Stratus (center), Mount Nimbus (right)

== See also ==
- List of peaks in Rocky Mountain National Park
- Mountains of Grand County, Colorado
