= Cascade Mountain =

Cascade Mountain may refer to:

- Cascade Mountain (Alberta) a mountain in Alberta, Canada
- Cascade Mountain (Colorado), a mountain in Grand County, Colorado, United States
- Cascade Mountain (New York) a mountain in New York, United States
- Cascade Mountain (ski area), a ski area in Wisconsin, United States
- Cascade Mountain (Utah), a mountain in Utah, United States. Part of the Wasatch Range.

== See also ==
- Cascade Mountains, a mountain range that runs north–south along the west coast of Canada and the United States
