= Baker Mountain (Colorado) =

Mountain in the American state of Colorado

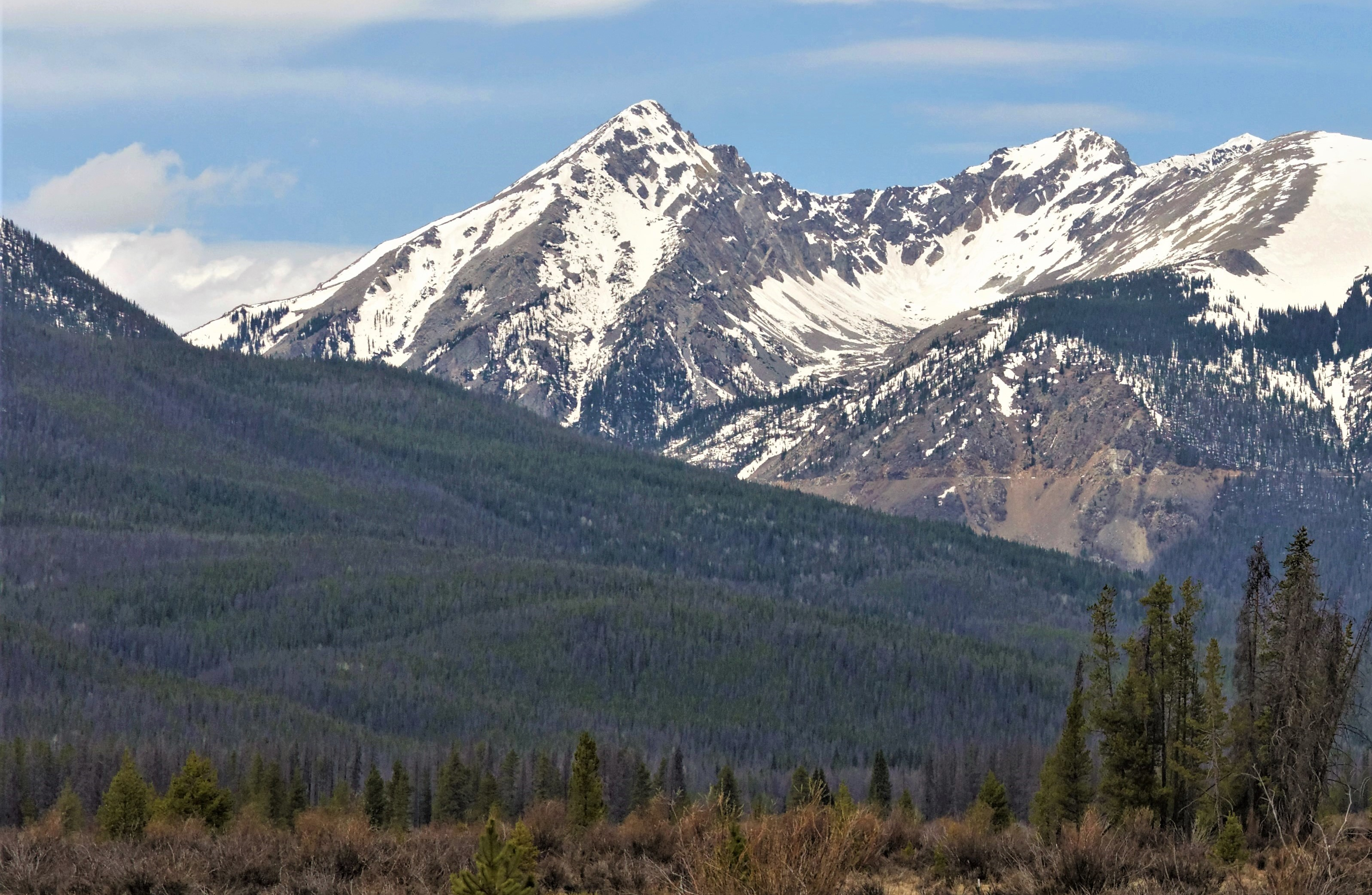
- Southeast aspect, from Kawuneeche Valley

Highest point
- Elevation: 12,410 ft (3,783 m)
- Prominence: 277 ft (84 m)
- Parent peak: Mount Nimbus (12,721 ft)
- Isolation: 1.06 mi (1.71 km)
- Coordinates: 40°22′54″N 105°54′23″W

Naming
- Etymology: John R. Baker

Geography
- Location within Colorado Location within the United States
- Country: United States
- State: Colorado
- County: Grand County
- Protected area: Rocky Mountain National Park; Never Summer Wilderness
- Parent range: Rocky Mountains; Never Summer Mountains
- Topo map: USGS Mount Richthofen

Climbing
- First ascent: 1875 by John R. Baker
- Easiest route: class 2 West slope

Baker Mountain is a 12,410-foot-elevation (3,780-meter) mountain summit in Grand County, Colorado, United States.

== Description ==
Baker Mountain is the 15th-highest peak of the Never Summer Mountains which are a subrange of the Rocky Mountains. The mountain is situated on the western boundary of Rocky Mountain National Park and the west side of the peak is in the Never Summer Wilderness, on land managed by Arapaho National Forest. Precipitation runoff from the mountain's slopes drains into headwaters of the Colorado River except for a portion of which is diverted by the Grand Ditch. Topographic relief is significant as the summit rises 3,500 feet (1,100 meters) above the Kawuneeche Valley in three miles (4.8 km) and 2,400 feet (730 meters) above Baker Gulch in 0.6 mile (1 km).

== History ==
The mountain is named for John R. Baker who made the first ascent of the summit in 1875. The mountain's toponym was officially adopted in 1932 by the United States Board on Geographic Names, and named in association with Baker Gulch which had been reported in publications since at least 1906.

== Climate ==
According to the Köppen climate classification system, Baker Mountain is located in an alpine subarctic climate zone with cold, snowy winters, and cool to warm summers. Due to its altitude, it receives precipitation all year, as snow in winter, and as thunderstorms in summer, with a dry period in late spring.

== See also ==
- List of peaks in Rocky Mountain National Park
- Mountains of Grand County, Colorado

== Gallery ==
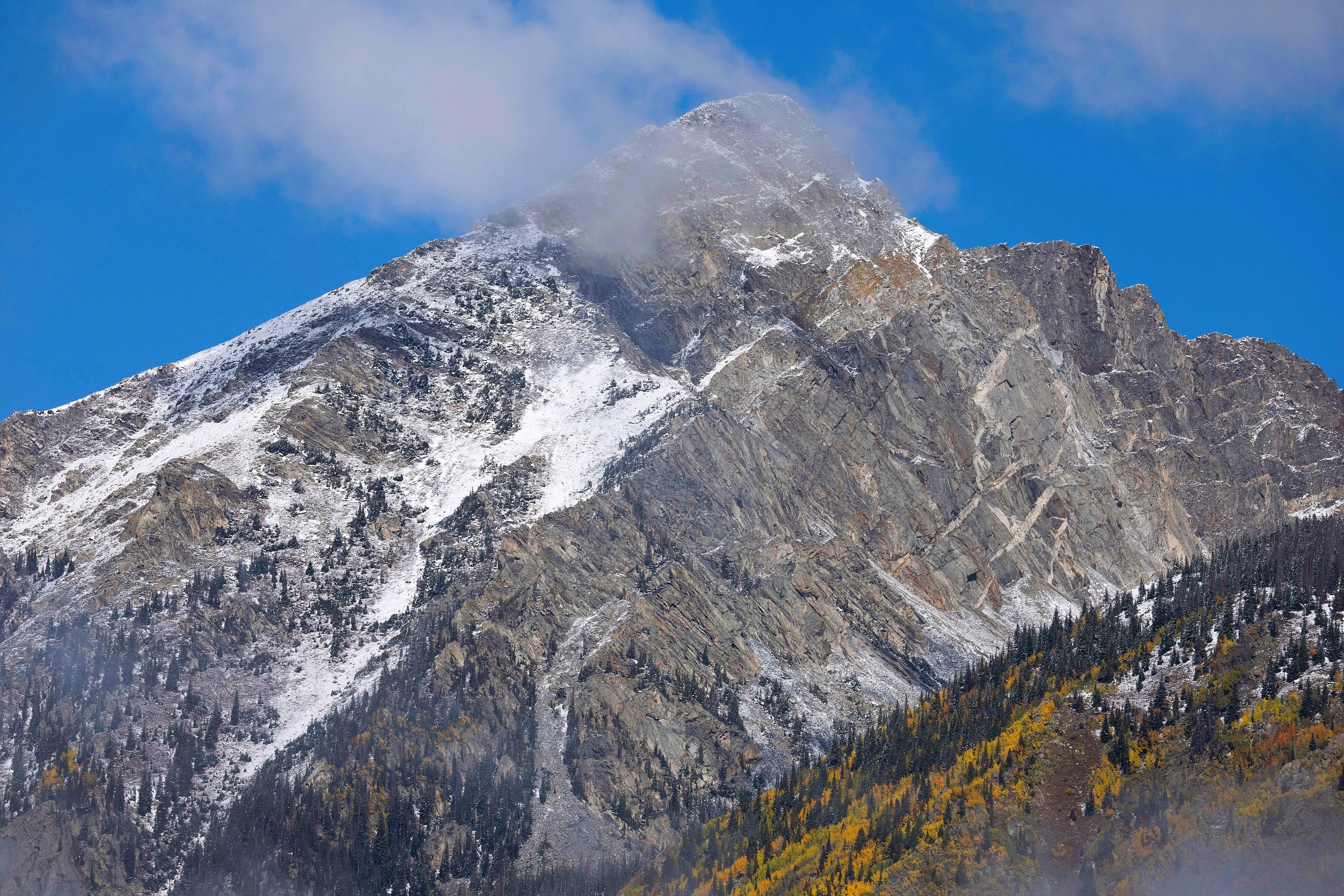
Southeast aspect

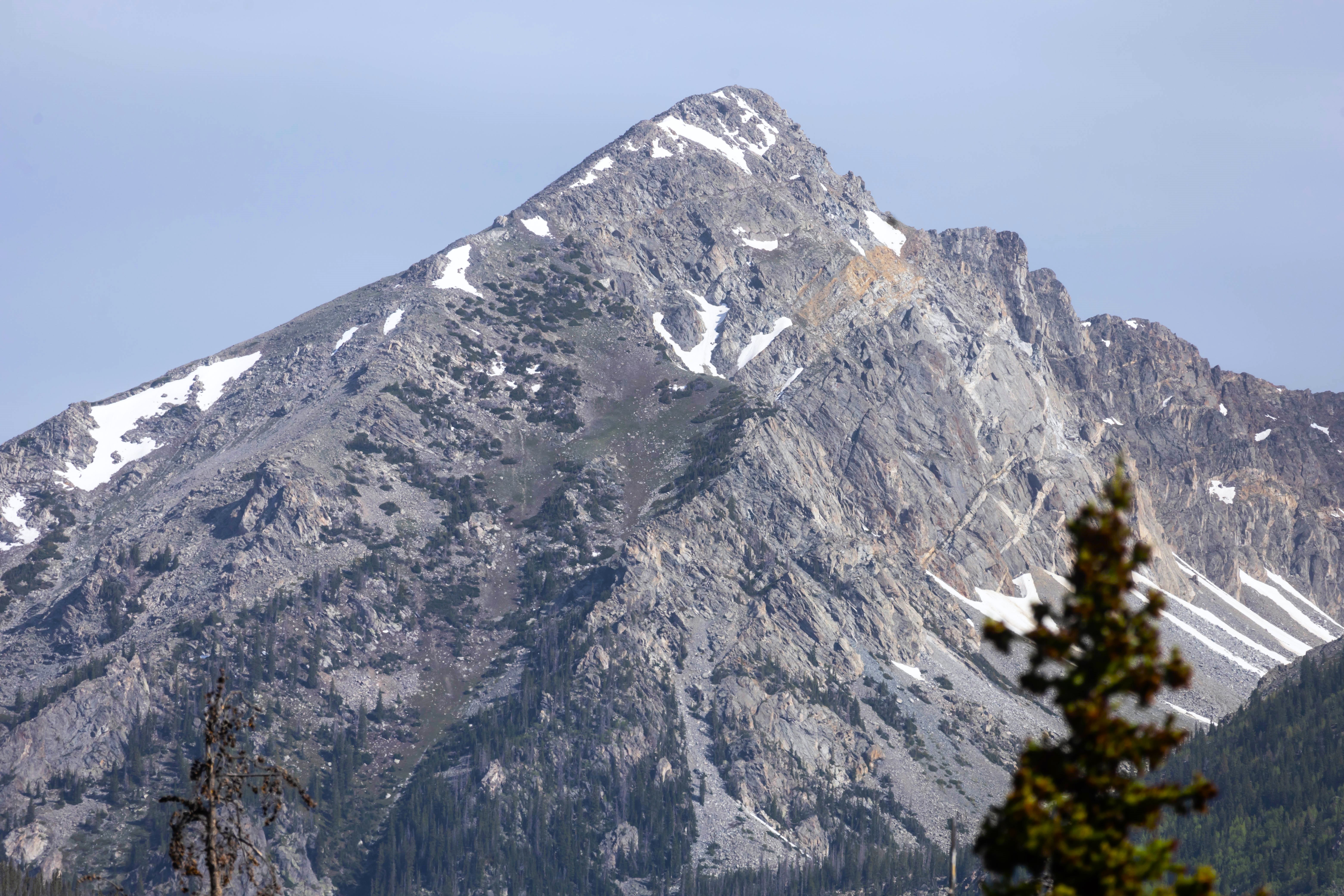
Southeast aspect

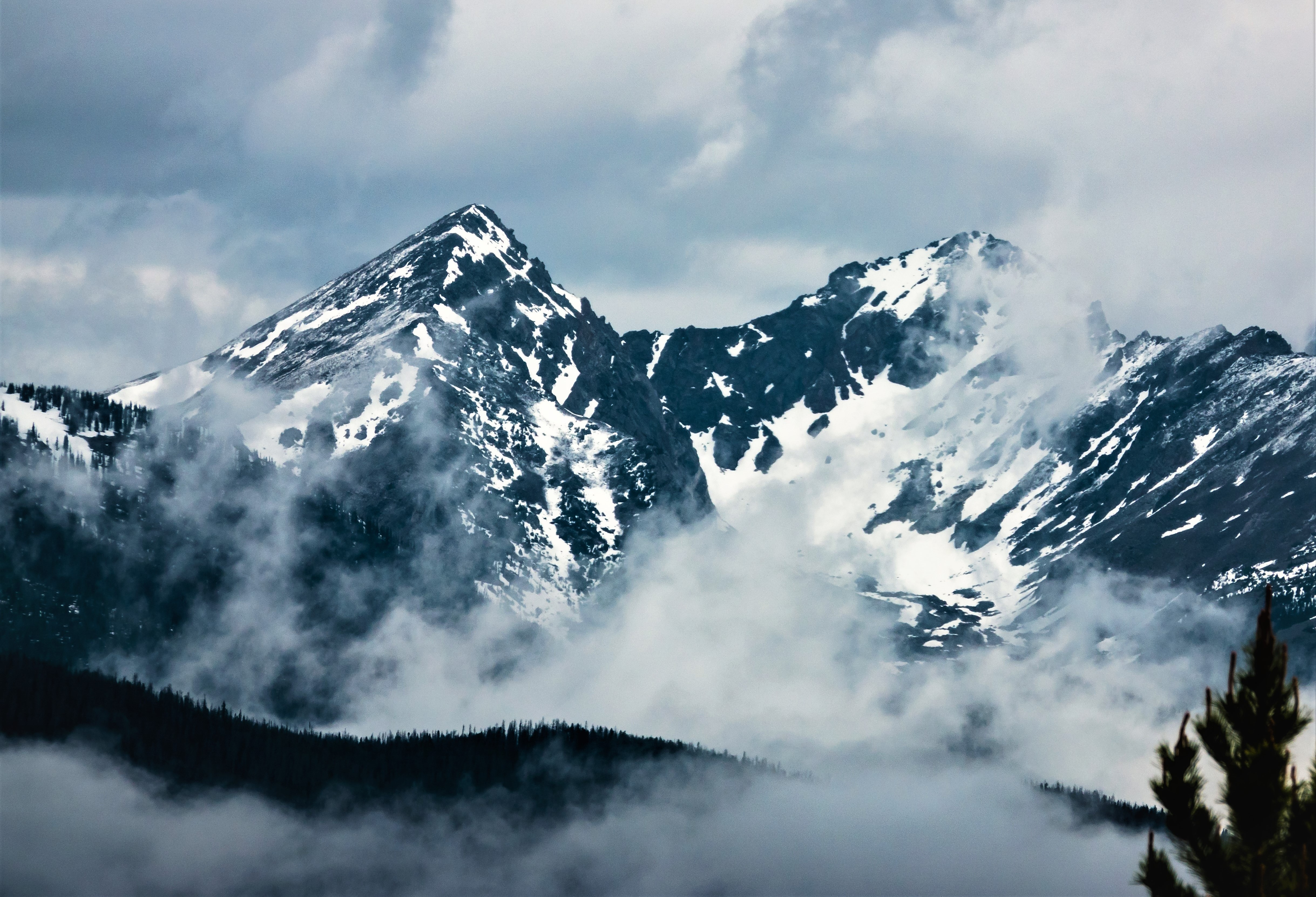
Baker Mountain (left) and Mt. Stratus
