= Never Summer Wilderness =

Wilderness area in Colorado, United States

- IUCN category Ib (wilderness area)
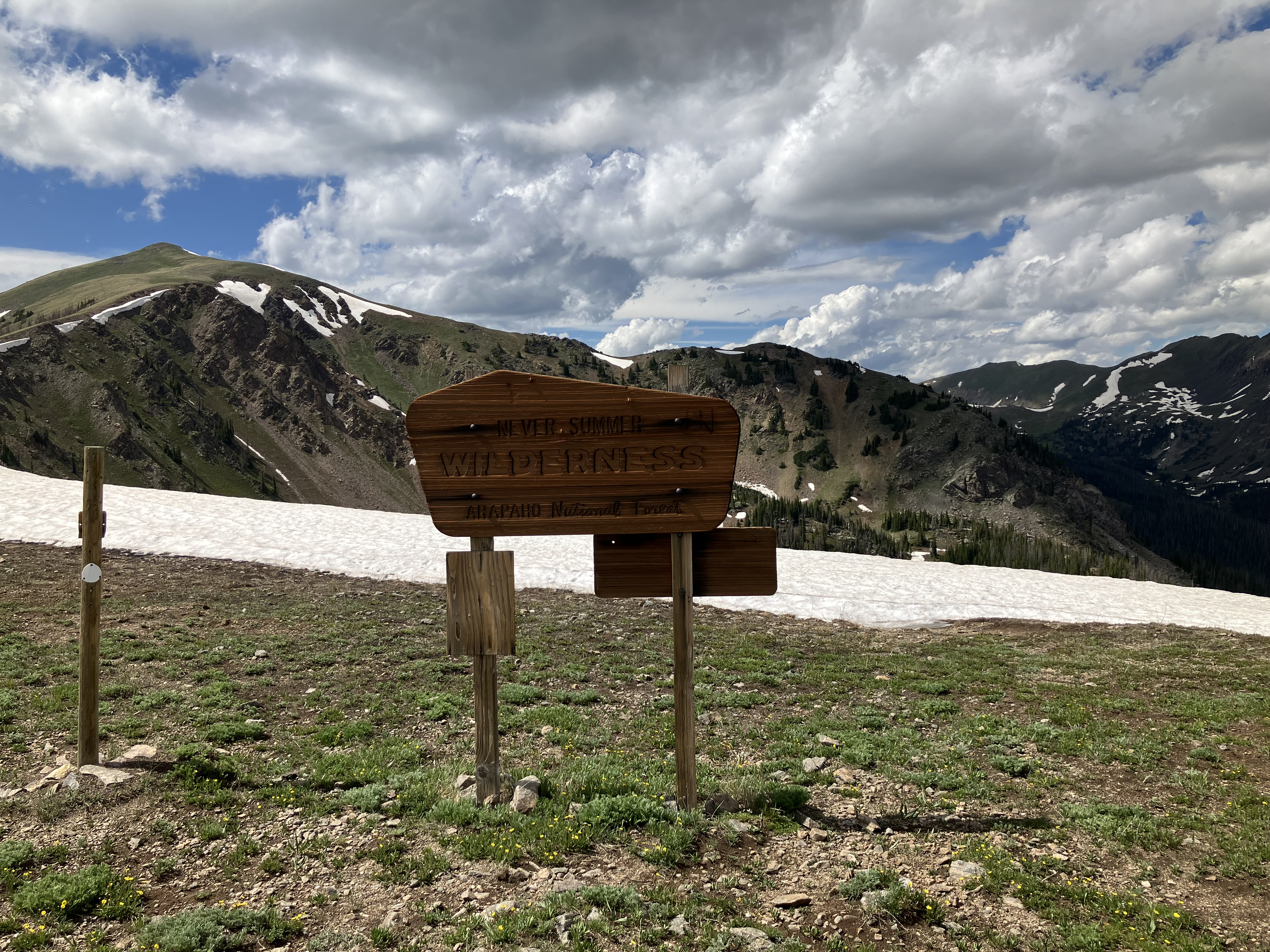

- Location within the United States
- Location: Grand County / Jackson County, Colorado, USA
- Nearest city: Grand Lake, CO
- Coordinates: 40°24′9″N 105°54′53″W
- Area: 21,090 acres (85.3 km^{2})
- Established: 1980
- Governing body: U.S. Forest Service

The Never Summer Wilderness is a U.S. Wilderness Area located immediately west of Rocky Mountain National Park in the Never Summer Mountains of Arapaho National Forest in northern Colorado. It encompasses an area of 21,090 acres (32.95 square miles) and includes both forest and alpine tundra, with a minimum elevation of 8,900 feet. It is part of the Sulphur Ranger District.

== Geographical Features ==
The eastern boundary of the wilderness is shared with Rocky Mountain National Park and runs partly along the Continental Divide. This boundary includes eight mountains with elevations above 12,000 feet (3,700 m): Tepee Mountain, Lead Mountain, Mount Cirrus, Howard Mountain, Mount Cumulus, Mount Nimbus, Mount Stratus, and Baker Mountain. Of these, Howard Mountain is the tallest, with an elevation of 12,806–12,810 feet (3,903–3,904 m).

The Never Summer Wilderness receives large amounts of rain and snow, and runoff from this area provides water to the Colorado River, the North Platte, and the Cache la Poudre. Other water features include the South Fork Michigan River and several lakes, including Bowen Lake, Blue Lake, Ruby Lake, and Parika Lake.

The area includes ravines rising above 10,000 feet, most notably Bowen Gulch. Because the ravine acts as a moisture trap, trees in Bowen Gulch are able to grow much larger than they normally would at high elevation. Consequently, Bowen Gulch is home to old-growth spruce and fir trees that are estimated to be 600 years old and measure up to four feet in diameter.

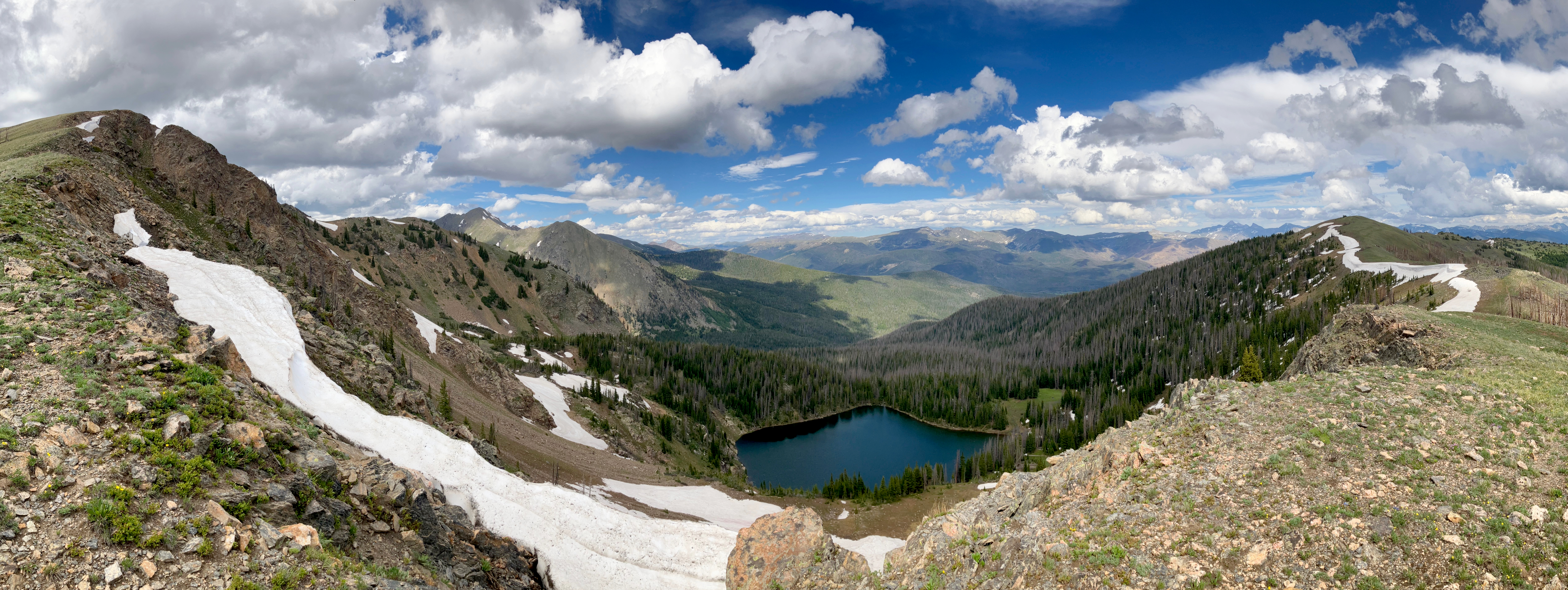
View of the Never Summer Wilderness from the ridge of Cascade Mountain above Bowen Lake, looking east (June 2024).

== Flora and Fauna ==
The area is forested by spruce, fir, and lodgepole pine. Swampy areas in the wilderness are home to bog bean.

Wildlife in the Never Summer Wilderness includes moose, which were reintroduced in the 1970s and '80s. Wood frogs and pygmy shrew (subspecies Sorex hoyi montanus) inhabit ponds and bogs in the area. Several lakes and streams provide habitat for trout.

== History ==
The Never Summer Wilderness was created under the 1980 Colorado Wilderness Act, originally designated as a 14,100-acre area along the main ridge of the Never Summer Mountains.

In 1988, the adjacent Bowen Gulch area was acquired by Louisiana-Pacific Corporation for logging. Clear-cutting operations targeting the old-growth forest in Bowen Gulch caused protests and eco-terrorism (specifically tree spiking) by the environmentalist group Earth First!, and spurred public outcry. Colorado Senator Tim Wirth received over 1,000 letters asking to protect Bowen Gulch.

The pushback from the public successfully halted the logging operation, with Louisiana-Pacific Corp. reaching a deal with the U.S. Forest Service in 1990 to preserve the ancient forest. That same year, Colorado House Representative David Skaggs proposed a bill to designate 9,960 acres of the Bowen Gulch area as part of the existing Never Summer Wilderness. A version of the bill was passed in 1993, adding 6,990 acres around Bowen Gulch to the Never Summer Wilderness and designating 11,600 acres of adjacent forest as a "protection area" where motor vehicles would be allowed only on existing roads and trails. This expansion made the Never Summer Wilderness the size it is today (21,090 acres).
