= Long Draw Reservoir =

- Location within Colorado Location within the United States
- Location: Larimer County – Colorado
- Coordinates: 40°29′56.89″N 105°47′11.66″W
- Type: Reservoir
- Primary outflows: La Poudre Pass Creek
- Basin countries: United States
- Surface elevation: 3,081 m (10,108 ft)

Long Draw Reservoir is a reservoir located in the Rocky Mountains of northern Colorado in the United States. The reservoir is located in Larimer County in the Roosevelt National Forest at 3,081 m (10,108 ft) and drains into La Poudre Pass Creek.

The Long Draw Campground is located just north of the reservoir.

== History ==
Reservoir construction began in 1927 to store water from the Grand Ditch and originally contained 4,000 acre-feet (4,900,000 cubic meters) of water but was enlarged in 1974 to 11,000 acre-feet (14,000,000 cubic meters). Much of the land for the reservoir was part of Rocky Mountain National Park before being transferred to the U.S. Forest Service in 1924.

In 2011, the National Park Service approved the restoration of native greenback cutthroat trout as part of the reservoir's 30-year re-authorization.

== Dam ==
The dam, Long Draw Dam, (National ID # CO00140) is an 84-foot tall earthen dam completed in 1975. The dam is owned by Water Supply & Storage Company and is used for irrigation.

== Climate ==
Climate data for Long Draw Reservoir, Colorado, 2010–2020 normals: 9980ft (3042m)
Month	Jan	Feb	Mar	Apr	May	Jun	Jul	Aug	Sep	Oct	Nov	Dec	Year
Mean daily maximum °F (°C)	28.7 (−1.8)	30.0 (−1.1)	39.8 (4.3)	44.5 (6.9)	52.4 (11.3)	65.9 (18.8)	69.6 (20.9)	67.5 (19.7)	62.1 (16.7)	47.5 (8.6)	36.5 (2.5)	27.8 (−2.3)	47.7 (8.7)
Daily mean °F (°C)	16.8 (−8.4)	17.5 (−8.1)	25.4 (−3.7)	31.3 (−0.4)	39.2 (4.0)	49.5 (9.7)	53.8 (12.1)	51.8 (11.0)	46.8 (8.2)	35.5 (1.9)	24.3 (−4.3)	15.6 (−9.1)	34.0 (1.1)
Mean daily minimum °F (°C)	4.7 (−15.2)	5.0 (−15.0)	10.9 (−11.7)	18.2 (−7.7)	26.0 (−3.3)	33.2 (0.7)	37.9 (3.3)	36.0 (2.2)	31.5 (−0.3)	23.4 (−4.8)	12.1 (−11.1)	3.4 (−15.9)	20.2 (−6.6)
Average precipitation inches (mm)	2.84 (72)	2.99 (76)	3.09 (78)	3.95 (100)	2.91 (74)	1.64 (42)	2.01 (51)	1.68 (43)	1.92 (49)	2.73 (69)	2.79 (71)	2.46 (62)	31.01 (787)
Source 1: XMACIS2
Source 2: NOAA (Precipitation)
