= Lead Mountain (Grand County, Colorado) =

Mountain in Colorado, United States

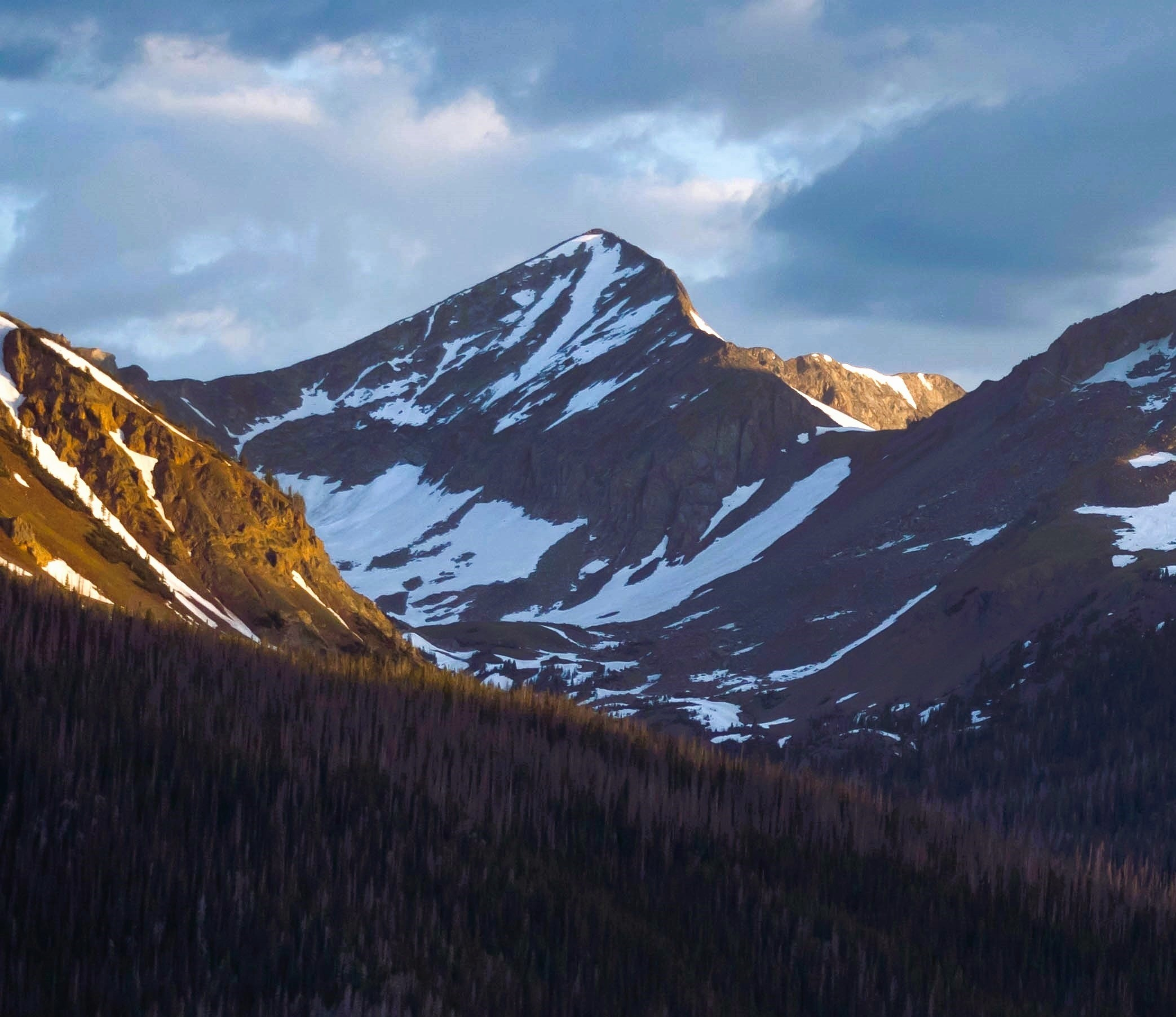
- Southeast aspect at sunrise

Highest point
- Elevation: 12,546 ft (3,824 m)
- Prominence: 465 ft (142 m)
- Parent peak: Mount Cirrus (12,808 ft)
- Isolation: 0.98 mi (1.58 km)
- Coordinates: 40°26′55″N 105°53′49″W

Geography
- Location within Colorado Location within the United States
- Country: United States
- State: Colorado
- County: Grand County / Jackson County
- Protected area: Rocky Mountain National Park; Never Summer Wilderness
- Parent range: Rocky Mountains; Never Summer Mountains
- Topo map: USGS Mount Richthofen

Lead Mountain is a summit in Grand County, Colorado, in the United States. With an elevation of 12,546 feet (3,824 m), Lead Mountain is the 970th-highest summit in the state of Colorado. Lead Mountain was named in 1879 on account of its lead deposits.

Lead Mountain is situated on the Continental Divide along the boundary shared by Grand County and Jackson County. It is part of the Never Summer Mountains which are a subrange of the Rocky Mountains. The mountain is situated on the western boundary of Rocky Mountain National Park, and the west side of the peak is in the Never Summer Wilderness, on land managed by Medicine Bow–Routt National Forest. Precipitation runoff from the mountain's west slope drains into tributaries of the Michigan River and the east slope drains into headwaters of the Colorado River. The counterintuitive direction of water flow is because the Continental Divide forms a loop in this area, whereby the peak's west slope runoff flows to the Atlantic Ocean and the east slope to the Pacific.

== Climate ==
According to the Köppen climate classification system, the mountain is located in an alpine subarctic climate zone with cold, snowy winters, and cool to warm summers. Due to its altitude, it receives precipitation all year, as snow in winter, and as thunderstorms in summer, with a dry period in late spring.

== Gallery ==
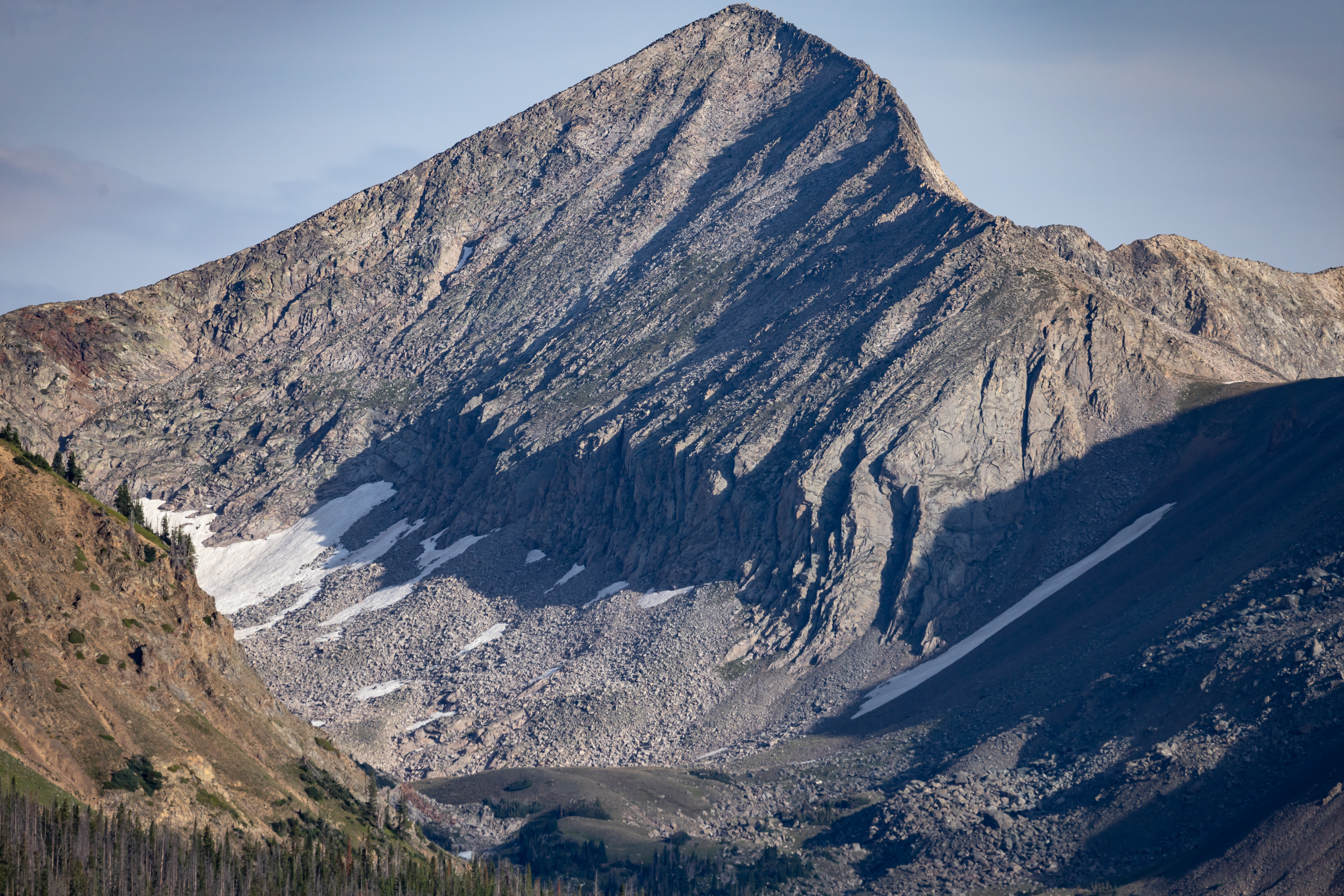
Southeast aspect of Lead Mountain

== See also ==
- List of peaks in Rocky Mountain National Park
- Mountains of Grand County, Colorado
- Mountains of Jackson County, Colorado
