= Lead Mountain (Custer County, Colorado) =

Mountain in Colorado, United States

Coordinates: 38°10′56″N 105°12′25″W

Lead Mountain is a summit in Custer County, Colorado, in the United States. It is in the Wet Mountain Range. With an elevation of 9,731 feet (2,966 m), Lead Mountain is the 2343rd highest summit in the state of Colorado.
