= Howard Mountain =

Mountain in Colorado, United States

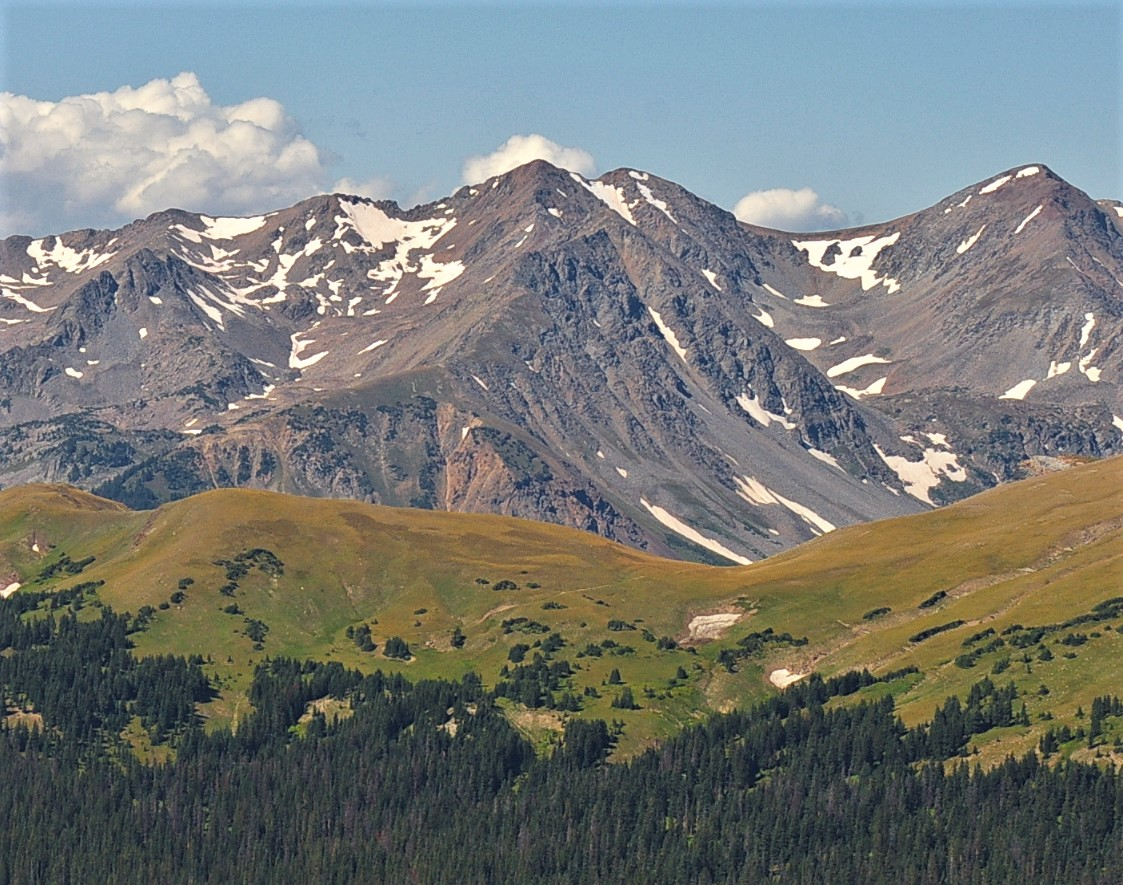
- East aspect, from Trail Ridge Road

Highest point
- Elevation: 12,826 ft (3,909 m)
- Prominence: 871 ft (265 m)
- Parent peak: Mount Richthofen (12,945 ft)
- Isolation: 2.93 mi (4.72 km)
- Coordinates: 40°25′37″N 105°53′56″W

Geography
- Location within Colorado Location within the United States
- Country: United States
- State: Colorado
- County: Grand County / Jackson County
- Protected area: Rocky Mountain National Park; Never Summer Wilderness
- Parent range: Rocky Mountains; Never Summer Mountains
- Topo map: USGS Mount Richthofen

Geology
- Rock type(s): Shale and granodiorite

Climbing
- Easiest route: Northwest ridge class 2

Howard Mountain is a 12,826-foot-elevation (3,909-meter) summit in Colorado, United States.

== Description ==
Howard Mountain is situated on the Continental Divide along the boundary shared by Grand County and Jackson County. It is the second-highest peak of the Never Summer Mountains which are a subrange of the Rocky Mountains. The mountain is situated on the western boundary of Rocky Mountain National Park and is visible from Trail Ridge Road within the park. The west side of the peak is in the Never Summer Wilderness which is managed by Medicine Bow–Routt National Forest, and the peak is the highest point of the wilderness. Precipitation runoff from the mountain's west slope drains into the South Fork of the Michigan River and the east slope drains into headwaters of the Colorado River except a portion of which is diverted by the Grand Ditch. The counterintuitive direction of water flow is because the Continental Divide forms a loop in this area, whereby the peak's west slope runoff flows to the Atlantic Ocean and the east slope to the Pacific. Topographic relief is significant as the summit rises over 3,600 feet (1,100 meters) above the Colorado River in three miles (4.8 km) and 2,600 feet (790 meters) above the South Fork Michigan River in one mile (1.6 km).

== Etymology ==
The namesake of the mountain's toponym is a mystery as it was applied on early maps, perhaps it was named for an early prospector in this area. The toponym was officially adopted in 1932 by the United States Board on Geographic Names.

== Gallery ==
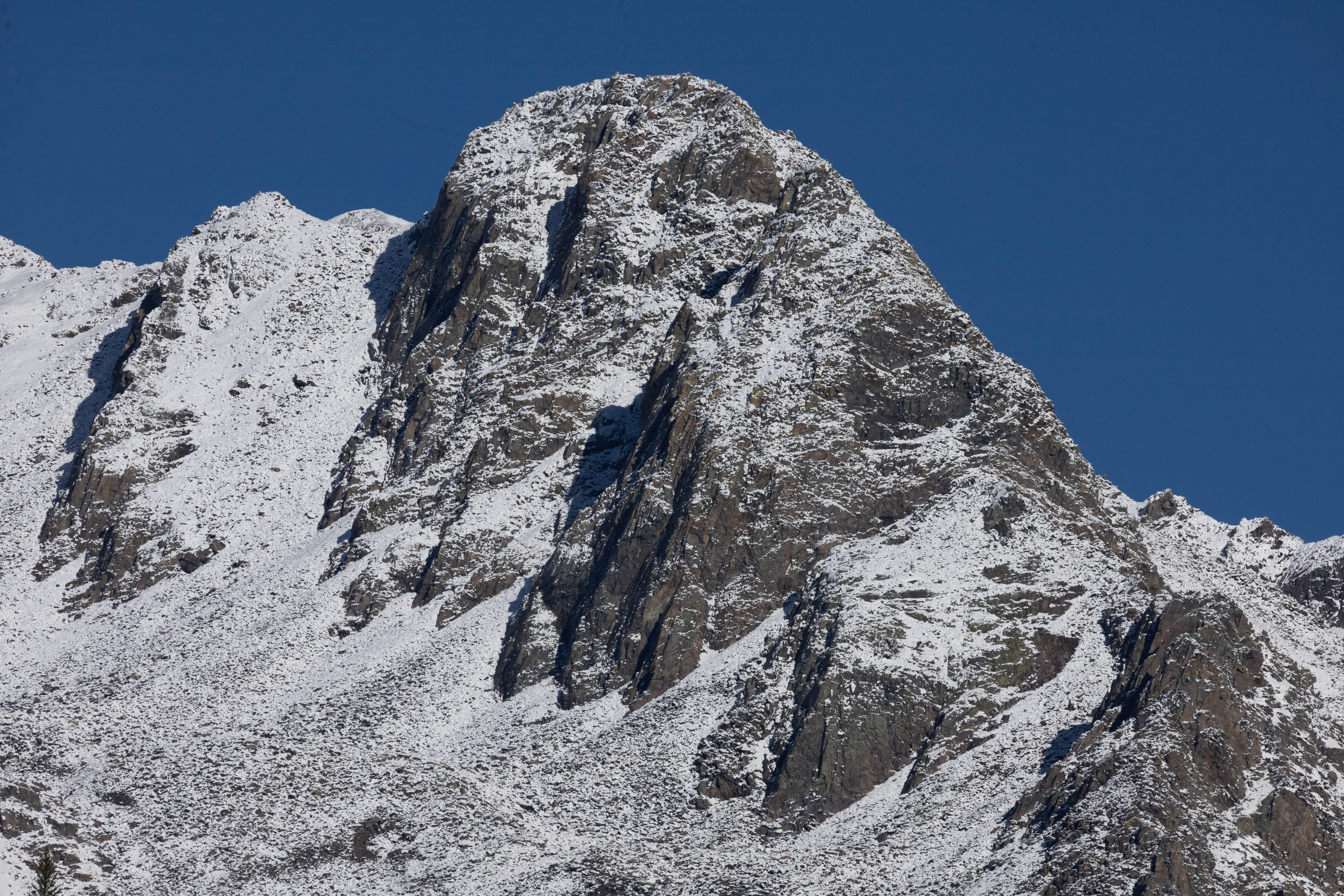
Southeast aspect

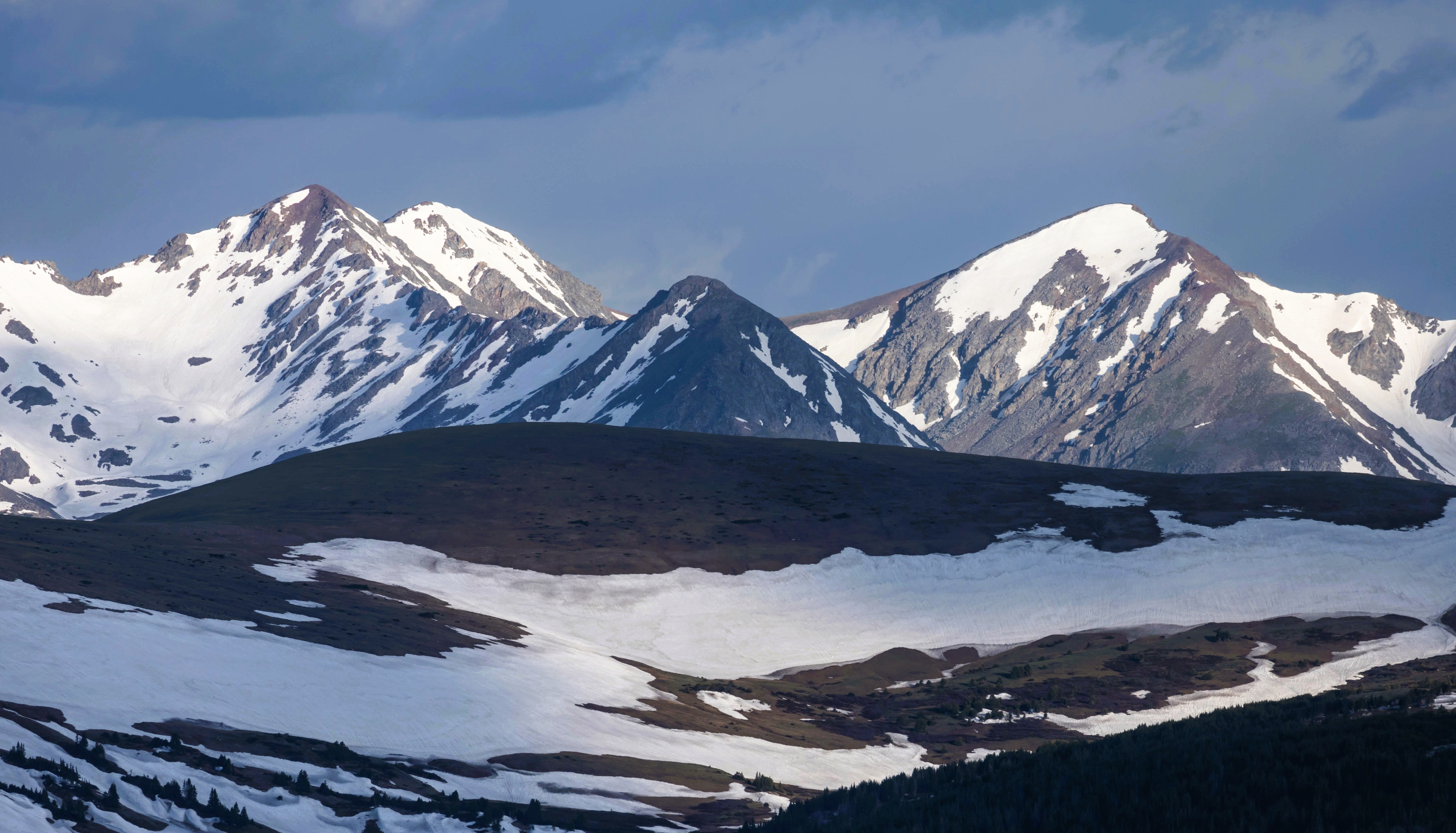
Howard Mountain (left) and Mt. Cirrus (right)

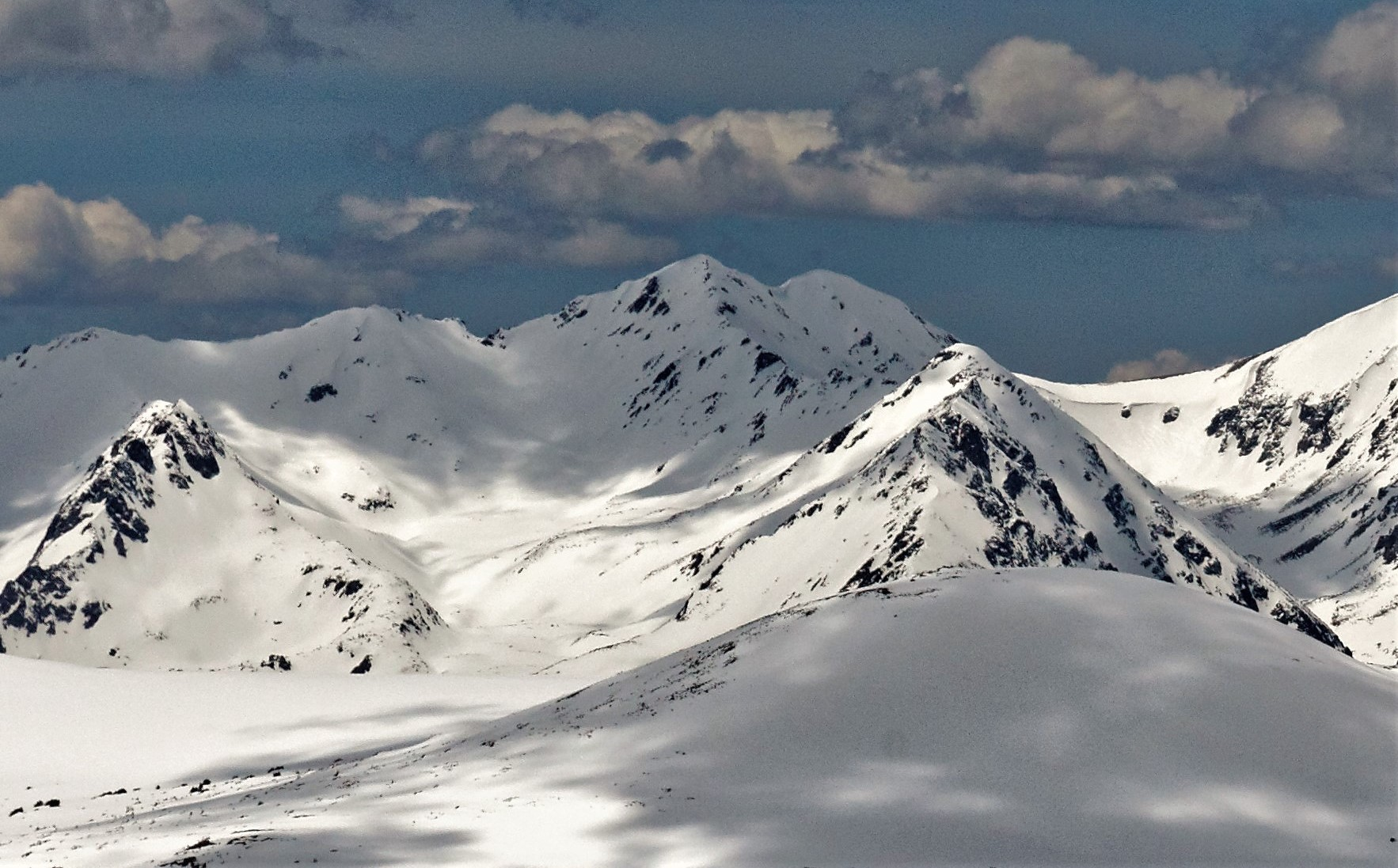
Howard Mountain centered in the distance

== Climate ==
According to the Köppen climate classification system, Howard Mountain is located in an alpine subarctic climate zone with cold, snowy winters, and cool to warm summers. Due to its altitude, it receives precipitation all year, as snow in winter, and as thunderstorms in summer, with a dry period in late spring.

Climate data for Howard Mountain 40.4258 N, 105.8998 W, Elevation: 12,280 ft (3,743 m) (1991–2020 normals)
Month	Jan	Feb	Mar	Apr	May	Jun	Jul	Aug	Sep	Oct	Nov	Dec	Year
Mean daily maximum °F (°C)	20.1 (−6.6)	20.0 (−6.7)	27.0 (−2.8)	34.2 (1.2)	43.3 (6.3)	54.0 (12.2)	60.6 (15.9)	58.6 (14.8)	51.6 (10.9)	39.5 (4.2)	27.1 (−2.7)	20.3 (−6.5)	38.0 (3.4)
Daily mean °F (°C)	11.7 (−11.3)	11.4 (−11.4)	17.4 (−8.1)	23.4 (−4.8)	32.5 (0.3)	42.8 (6.0)	49.8 (9.9)	47.8 (8.8)	41.0 (5.0)	29.9 (−1.2)	19.0 (−7.2)	11.9 (−11.2)	28.2 (−2.1)
Mean daily minimum °F (°C)	3.3 (−15.9)	2.9 (−16.2)	7.8 (−13.4)	12.7 (−10.7)	21.7 (−5.7)	31.7 (−0.2)	38.9 (3.8)	37.1 (2.8)	30.4 (−0.9)	20.3 (−6.5)	10.8 (−11.8)	3.6 (−15.8)	18.4 (−7.5)
Average precipitation inches (mm)	3.79 (96)	3.91 (99)	4.14 (105)	5.19 (132)	4.53 (115)	2.22 (56)	2.24 (57)	2.56 (65)	2.62 (67)	3.49 (89)	3.71 (94)	3.38 (86)	41.78 (1,061)
Source: PRISM Climate Group

== See also ==
- List of peaks in Rocky Mountain National Park
- Mountains of Grand County, Colorado
- Mountains of Jackson County, Colorado
