= Cascade Mountain (Colorado) =

Mountain in Colorado, United States

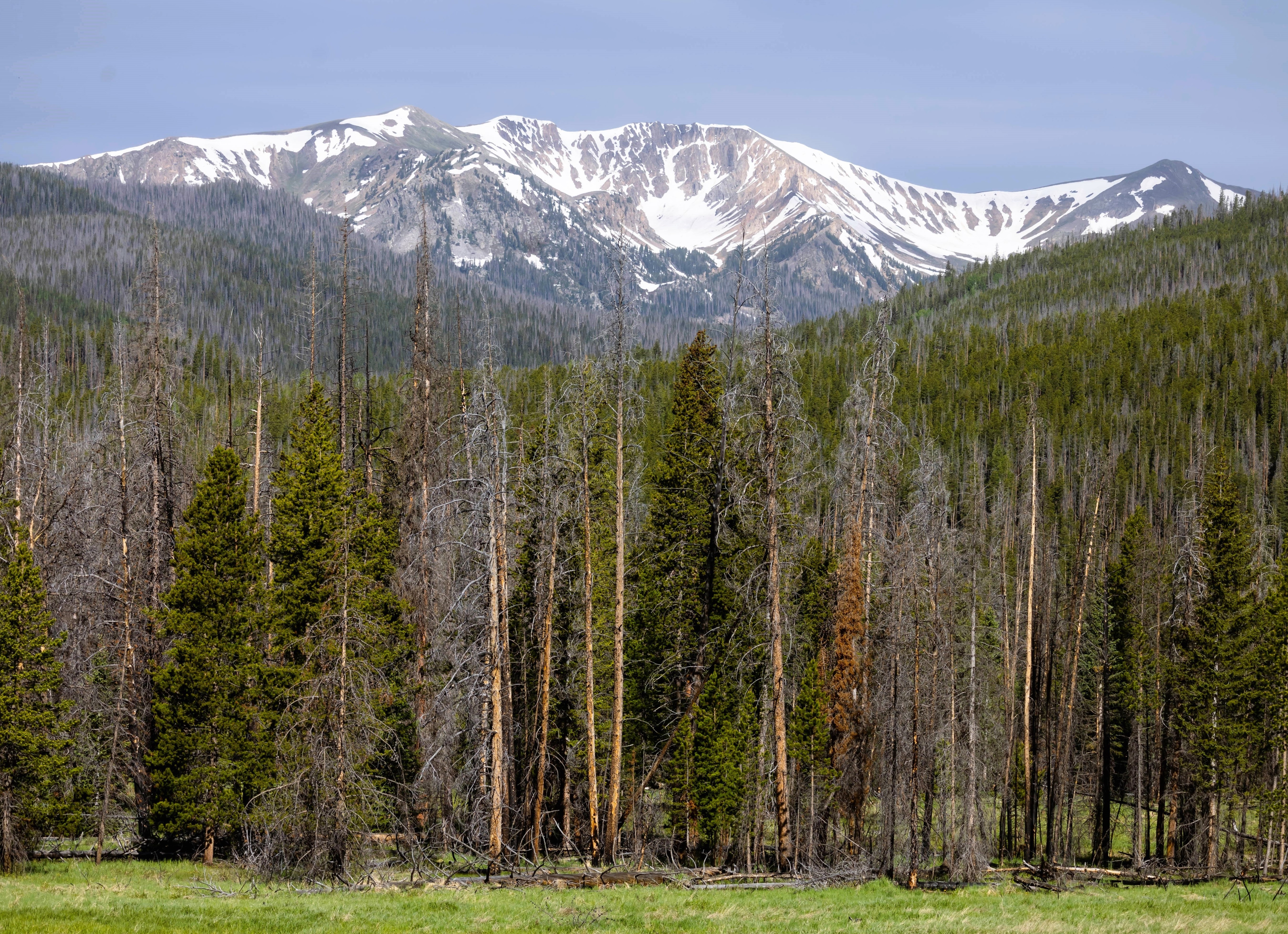
- East aspect, from Kawuneeche Valley

Highest point
- Elevation: 12,326 ft (3,757 m)
- Prominence: 843 ft (257 m)
- Parent peak: Bowen Mountain (12,524 ft)
- Isolation: 2.01 mi (3.23 km)
- Coordinates: 40°20′14″N 105°57′36″W

Geography
- Location within Colorado Location within the United States
- Country: United States
- State: Colorado
- County: Grand
- Protected area: Never Summer Wilderness
- Parent range: Rocky Mountains; Never Summer Mountains
- Topo map: USGS Bowen Mountain

Geology
- Rock age: Paleoproterozoic
- Mountain type: Fault block
- Rock type: Biotite granofels

Climbing
- Easiest route: class 2 hiking

Cascade Mountain is a 12,326-foot-elevation (3,757-meter) mountain summit in Grand County, Colorado, United States.

== Description ==
Cascade Mountain is part of the Never Summer Mountains which are a subrange of the Rocky Mountains. The mountain is set in the Never Summer Wilderness on land managed by Arapaho National Forest. It is situated along the Continental Divide with the summit offset by less than one mile. Precipitation runoff from the mountain's slopes drains to the nearby Colorado River via Willow Creek and Bowen Gulch. Topographic relief is significant as the summit rises 3,100 feet (945 meters) above Willow Creek in two miles (3.2 km) and 2,300 feet (701 meters) above Bowen Gulch in 1.5 miles (2.4 km). The mountain's toponym has been officially adopted by the United States Board on Geographic Names.

== Climate ==
According to the Köppen climate classification system, Cascade Mountain is located in an alpine subarctic climate zone with cold, snowy winters, and cool to warm summers. Due to its altitude, it receives precipitation all year, as snow in winter, and as thunderstorms in summer, with a dry period in late spring.

== See also ==
- Mountains of Grand County, Colorado
