= James Grafton Rogers =

American lawyer

James Grafton Rogers (January 13, 1883 - April 23, 1971) was the Assistant Secretary of State for the United States.

== Biography ==
Rogers was born on January 13, 1883, in Denver, Colorado, to Edmund James Armstrong Rogers (1852–1922) and Maria Georgina Dare.

Rogers was a professor of law and dean of the University of Colorado School of Law from 1928 to 1931, and 1933–35.

Rogers was one of the charter members of the Colorado Mountain Club and served as the club's first president after its founding.

He was the western vice president of the American Alpine Club from 1932 to 1934, and president of the American Alpine Club from 1938 to 1940.

Rogers died of a stroke on April 23, 1971, in Denver, Colorado.

Academic offices
Preceded by John D. Fleming	4th Dean of the University of Colorado School of Law; 1928-1931, 1933-35	Succeeded by Robert L. Stearns
