= Grand Ditch =

Colorado, USA water-diversion project

- Grand River Ditch
- U.S. National Register of Historic Places
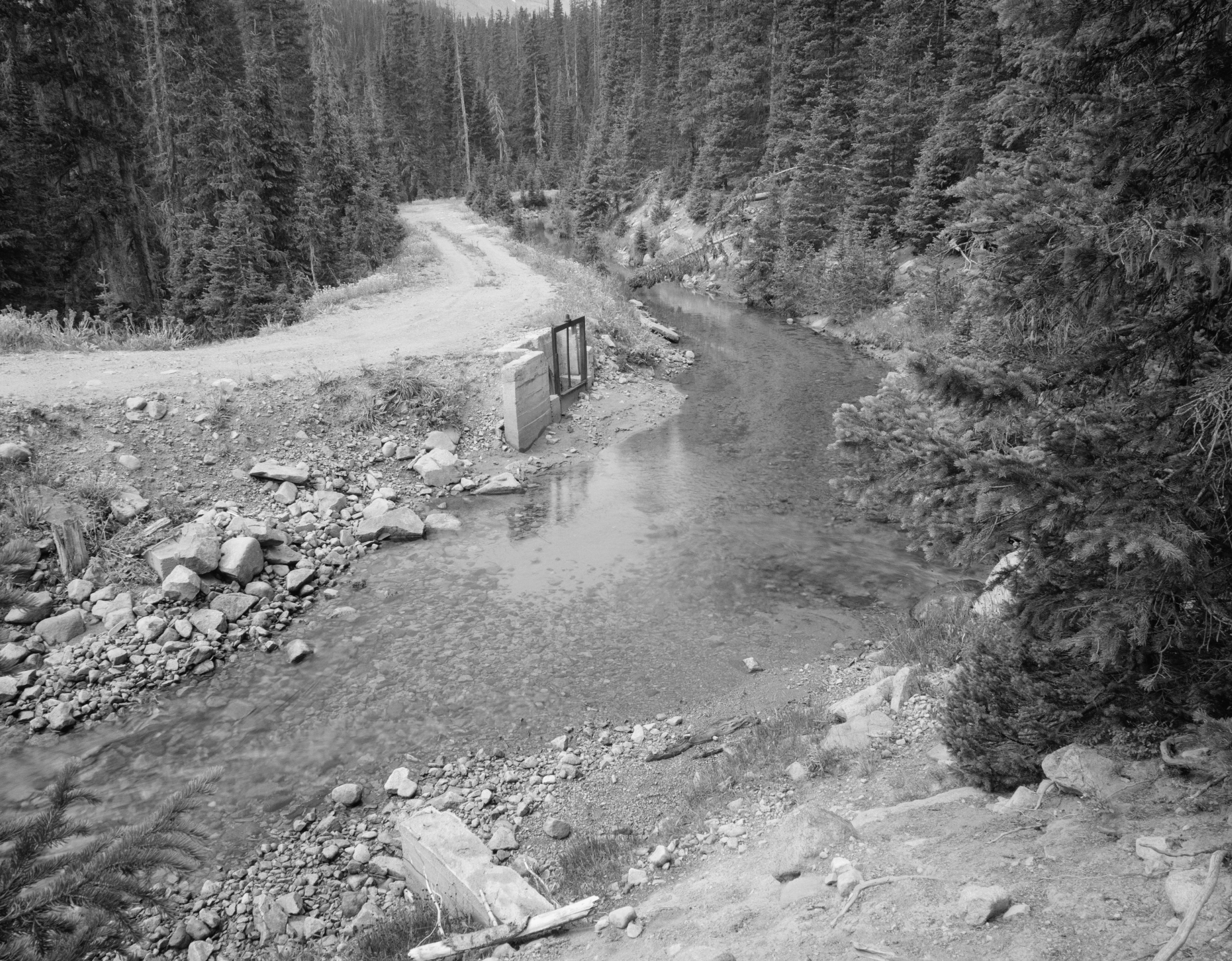

- Location within Colorado Location within the United States
- Nearest city: Grand Lake, Colorado
- Coordinates: 40°27′34″N 105°51′01″W
- Area: 460 acres (1.9 km^{2})
- Built: 1890
- Engineer: J.J. Argo
- MPS: Rocky Mountain National Park MRA (AD)
- NRHP reference No.: 76000218
- Added to NRHP: September 29, 1976

The Grand Ditch, also known as the Grand River Ditch and originally known as the North Grand River Ditch, is a water diversion project in the Never Summer Mountains, in northern Colorado in the United States. It is 14.3 miles (23.0 km) long, 20 feet (6.1 m) wide, and 3 feet (0.91 m) deep on average. Streams and creeks that flow from the highest peaks of the Never Summer Mountains are diverted into the ditch, which flows over the Continental Divide at La Poudre Pass at 10,175 feet (3,101 m), delivering the water into Long Draw Reservoir and the Cache La Poudre River for eastern plains farmers. The water would otherwise have gone into the Colorado River (formerly known as the "Grand River", from which the name of the ditch is derived) that flows west towards the Pacific; instead, the Cache La Poudre River goes east and through the Mississippi River discharges into the Gulf of Mexico.

The ditch was started in 1890 and wasn't completed until 1936. The ditch diverts between 20 and 40% of the runoff from the Never Summer Mountains, and delivers an average of 20,000 acre-feet (25,000,000 m^{3}). It significantly impacts the ecology in the valley below and the National Park Service has fought in court to reduce the amount of diverted water.

== History ==
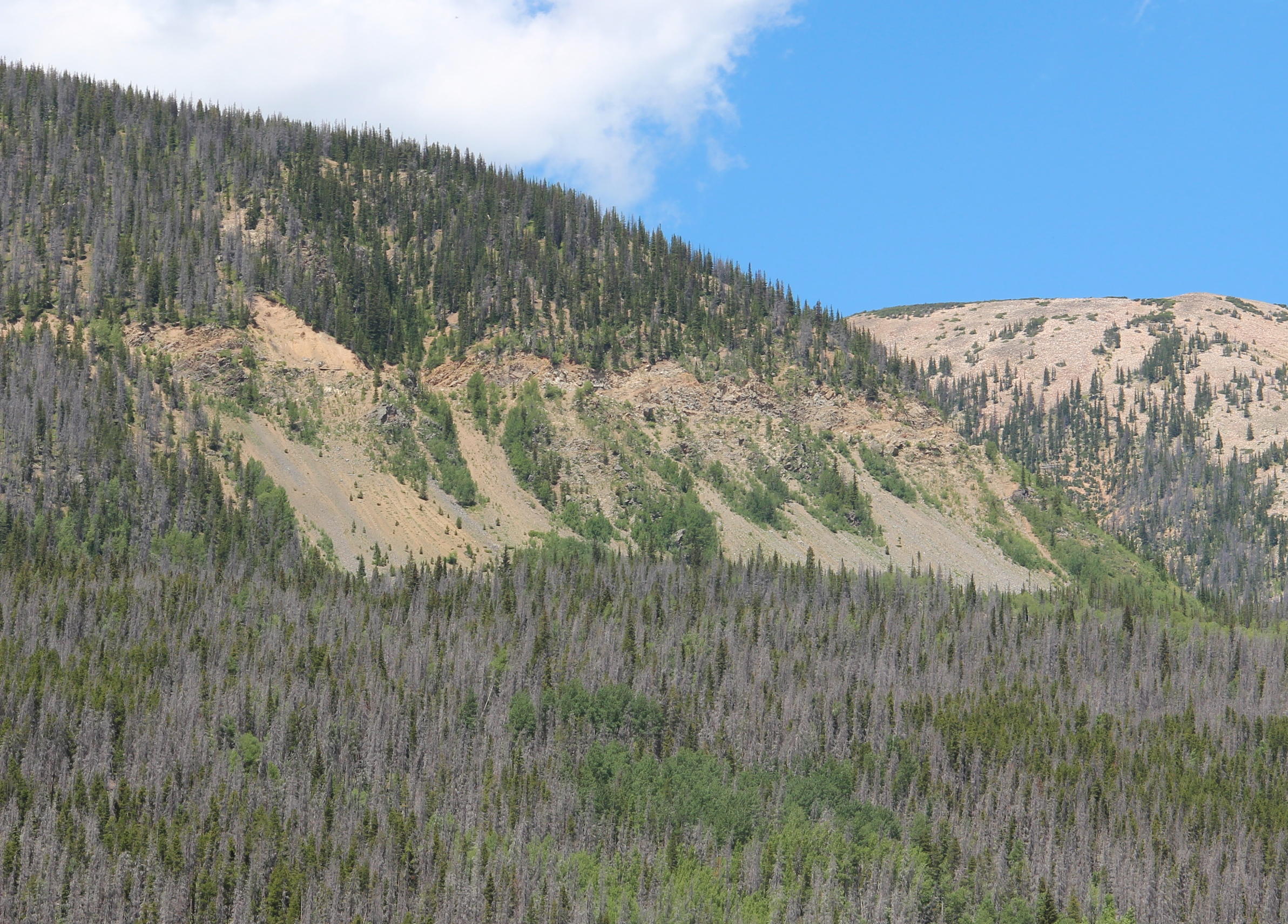
Grand Ditch seen from the Holzwarth Historic District

The Grand Ditch was built by the Larimer County Ditch Company, with Japanese and Mexican laborers, working with hand tools and black powder. The first diverted water flowed east across La Poudre Pass on October 15, 1890. Water Supply and Storage Company took over ownership in 1891. The ditch was extended every year, and reached three miles in 1894.

After the creation of Rocky Mountain National Park, increasing demand for water led to the creation of Long Draw Reservoir, and the required land was taken away from the park by Congress in 1923. Long Draw Reservoir opened in 1930. The Grand Ditch was then lengthened one more time—this also required an act of Congress, since it was now in a national park—to 14.3 miles (23.0 km) in September 1936.

In May 2003, a 100 ft (30 m) section of the ditch breached about 2.4 miles (3.9 km) south of La Poudre Pass, causing the water to cascade down the slopes and into the Colorado River. The flood left a visible scar on the mountainside: 20,000 trees were downed and 47,600 cubic yards of debris ended up in Lulu Creek and the headwaters of the Colorado River. The Water Supply and Storage Company reached a settlement to pay $9 million in damages to Rocky Mountain National Park. Periodic overflows of the ditch, of which the 2003 flood was but one example, has left debris all over the western side of the valley; the eastern side is not affected.

The Grand River Ditch was listed on the National Register of Historic Places on September 29, 1976. It can be hiked starting from the Bowen/Baker Trailhead, the Colorado River Trailhead or the Holzwarth Historic Site in Rocky Mountain National Park.

== See also ==
- National Register of Historic Places listings in Grand County, Colorado
- The Colorado-Big Thompson Project, a 1930s tunnel project for diverting Colorado River waters in the same area
