= Bowen =

Bowen may refer to:

== Places ==
- Bowen Mountain (disambiguation), including Mount Bowen
- Bowen Park (disambiguation)
- Bowen River (disambiguation)

=== Australia ===
- Bowen Bridge, crossing the River Derwent in Tasmania

==== Queensland ====
- Bowen, Queensland, a town
  - Bowen Orbital Spaceport (BOS), Abbot Point, Bowen
- Bowen Hills, a suburb
  - Bowen Hills railway station, a railway station in Bowen Hills
  - Bowen Park, Brisbane, a park in Bowen Hills
- Mount Bowen (Queensland)

=== Canada ===
- Bowen Island, British Columbia
- Bowen Lake, a lake in Alberta

=== Philippines ===
- Mariahangin, an island in Palawan also known as Bowen Island

=== United States ===
- Plant Bowen, a major coal-fired power plant in Georgia, U.S.
- Bowen, Illinois
- Bowen, Missouri
- Bowen, Nebraska
- Lake Bowen, a lake in South Carolina, U.S.
- Bowen, West Virginia

==== Colorado ====
- Bowen, Colorado (disambiguation)
- Bowen, Colorado (Las Animas County)
- Bowen, Colorado (Rio Grande County)
- Bowen Mountain (Colorado), a summit

=== Other places ===
- Bowen (crater), a lunar crater
- Mount Bowen, a peak on Mount Joyce, Victoria Land, Antarctica
- Bowen, Mendoza, a district in the General Alvear Department, Argentina
- Bowen Road, Hong Kong
- Bowen's Court, County Cork, Ireland
- Bowen University, Iwo, Nigeria
- Bowen Secondary School, a secondary school in Hougang, Singapore

== People ==
- Bowen (surname)
- Judge Bowen (disambiguation)
- Justice Bowen (disambiguation)

=== People with the family name ===
- Anthony Bowens (born 1990), American professional wrestler
- Edward L. Bowen (1942–2025), American horse racing historian and author
- George Bowen (1821–1899), British viceregal
- Isabelle Bowen (1899–1969), American painter and floriculturist
- Jarrod Bowen (born 1996), English footballer
- John Bowen (pirate) (16??–1704), pirate of Créole origin active during the Golden Age of Piracy
- Natasha Bowen, Nigerian Welsh writer
- York Bowen (1884-1961), composer

=== People with the given name ===
- Bowen Ebenezer Aylsworth (1835–1914), Ontario political figure
- Bowen Byram (born 2001), Canadian ice hockey player
- Bowen Huang (born 1987), Chinese footballer
- Bowen Leung (born 1949), former Hong Kong civil servant
- Bowen Lockwood (born 1978), former Australian rules footballer
- Bowen Ouyang (born 1992), Chinese male tennis player
- Bowen Southwell (1713–1796), Irish politician
- Bowen Stassforth (1926–2019), American former competition swimmer
- Bowen Yang (born 1990), American comedian, SNL cast member

== Other ==
- Bowen knot, an emblem
- Bowen ratio, used to describe energy flux
- Bowen technique, an alternative massage therapy
- Bowen Theory, developed by Murray Bowen, M.D.
- Bowen's Disease, a sunlight-induced skin disease
- Bowen's Kale, a calibration substance
- Bowen's reaction series, in geology
- Bowens International, a manufacturer of professional photographic lighting equipment
- HMAS Bowen, an Australian warship named after Bowen, Queensland
- Bowen script (僰文) traditionally used for writing the Bai language

== See also ==
- Bowenite, a mineral
- Bowenia, a genus of cycads in the family Stangeriaceae
