= Bowen, Colorado =

Bowen, Colorado may refer to:

- Bowen, Las Animas County, Colorado, USA
- Bowen, Rio Grande County, Colorado, USA
- Bowen Mountain (Colorado), USA; a summit

== See also ==
- Bowen (disambiguation)
