= Parika Peak =

Mountain in Colorado, United States

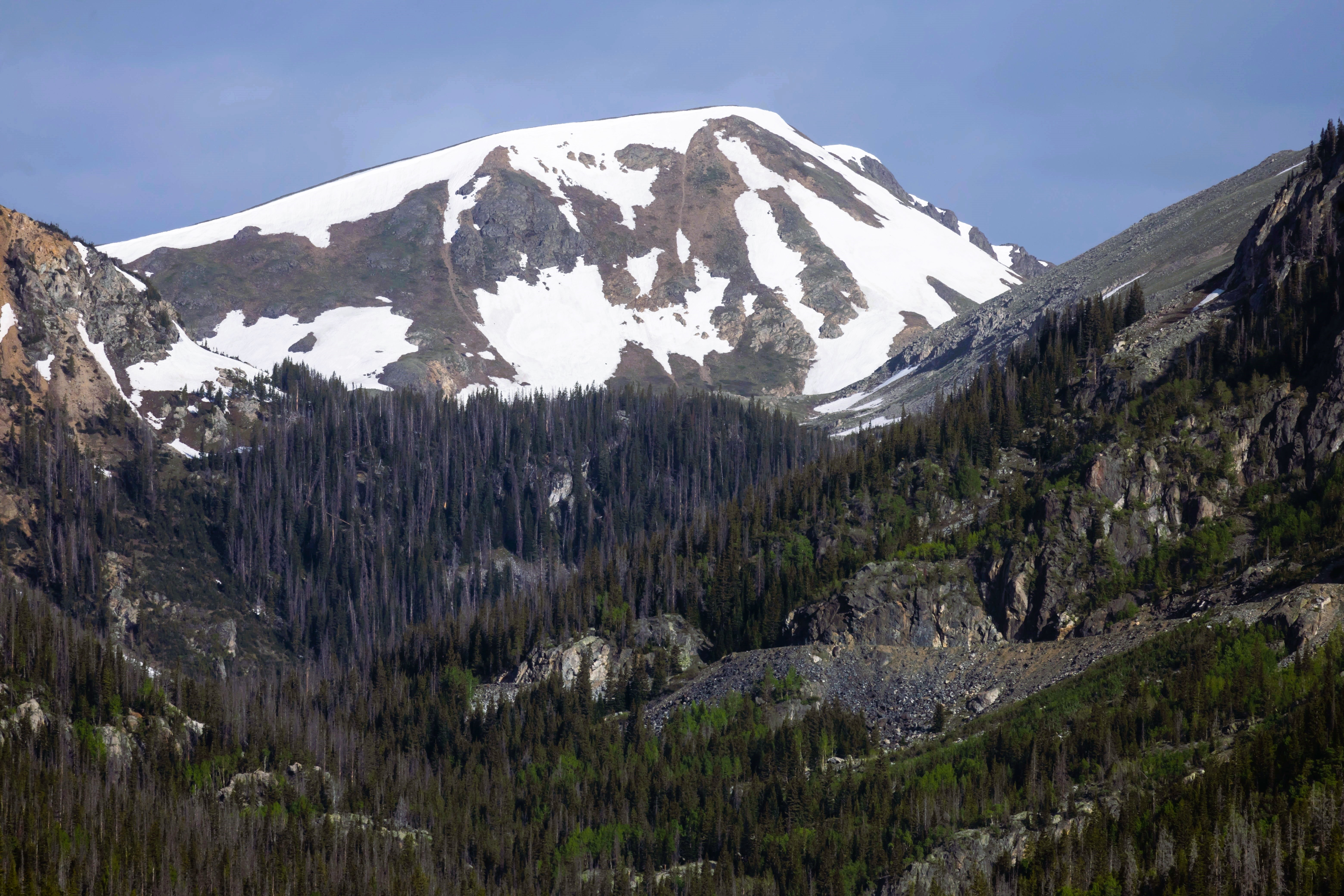
- East-southeast aspect From Kawuneeche Valley looking up Baker Gulch

Highest point
- Elevation: 12,402 ft (3,780 m)
- Prominence: 403 ft (123 m)
- Parent peak: Bowen Mountain (12,524 ft)
- Isolation: 1.94 mi (3.12 km)
- Coordinates: 40°23′06″N 105°56′48″W

Geography
- Location within Colorado Location within the United States
- Country: United States
- State: Colorado
- County: Grand / Jackson
- Protected area: Never Summer Wilderness
- Parent range: Rocky Mountains; Never Summer Mountains
- Topo map: USGS Mount Richthofen

Geology
- Rock age: Proterozoic
- Rock type(s): Amphibolite, granofels

Climbing
- Easiest route: hiking

Parika Peak is a 12,402-foot-elevation (3,780-meter) mountain summit in Colorado, United States.

== Description ==
Parika Peak is situated on the Continental Divide along the boundary shared by Grand County and Jackson County. It is the 13th-highest peak of the Never Summer Mountains which are a subrange of the Rocky Mountains. The west side of the peak is in the Medicine Bow–Routt National Forest and the east side is in the Never Summer Wilderness. Precipitation runoff from the mountain's slopes drains to Jack Creek and the Illinois River, with the exception of the southeast slope which drains to the Colorado River via Baker Gulch. The counterintuitive direction of water flow is because the Continental Divide forms a loop in this area, whereby the peak's west slope runoff flows to the Atlantic Ocean and the east slope to the Pacific. Topographic relief is significant as the summit rises 2,400 feet (732 meters) above Jack Creek in 1.6 miles (2.6 km) and 1,000 feet (305 meters) above Parika Lake in one-half mile (0.8 km). The summit can be reached from Parika Lake by hiking the south slope (class 1) or the east ridge (class 2).

== Etymology ==
The mountain's toponym has been officially adopted by the United States Board on Geographic Names, and has appeared in publications since at least 1919. The name Parika is from the Pawnee language "paariiku" (puh REE kuh) and means "horn."

== Climate ==
According to the Köppen climate classification system, Parika Peak is located in an alpine subarctic climate zone with cold, snowy winters, and cool to warm summers. Due to its altitude, it receives precipitation all year, as snow in winter, and as thunderstorms in summer, with a dry period in late spring.

== See also ==
- Mountains of Grand County, Colorado
- Mountains of Jackson County, Colorado
