= Braddock Peak =

Mountain in Colorado, United States

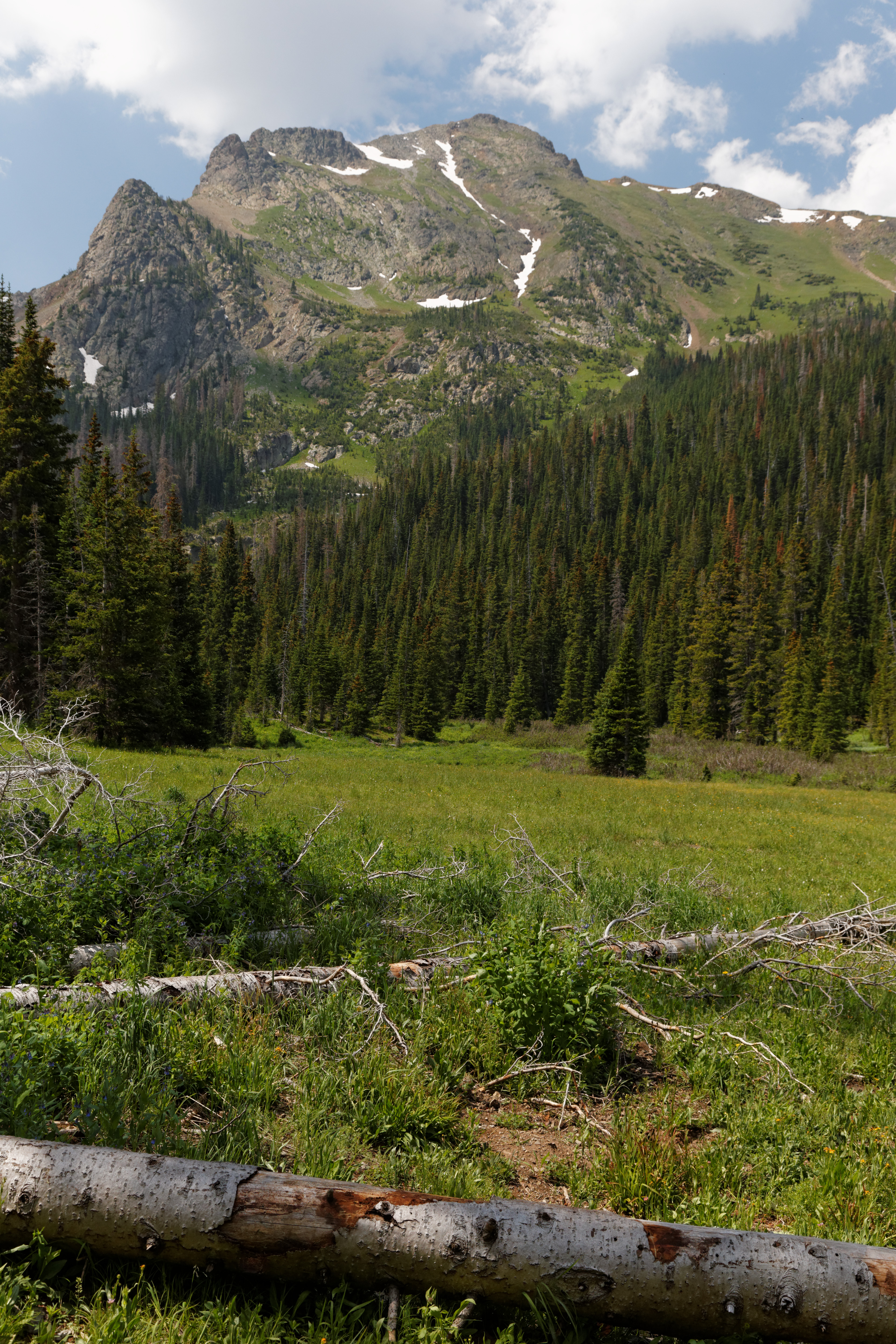
- Braddock Peak north aspect

Highest point
- Elevation: 11,972 ft (3,649 m)
- Prominence: 210 ft (64 m)
- Parent peak: Mount Mahler (12,497 ft)
- Isolation: 0.62 mi (1.00 km)
- Coordinates: 40°28′48″N 105°54′46″W

Geography
- Location within Colorado
- Location: Jackson County, Colorado, U.S.
- Parent range: Never Summer Mountains
- Topo map(s): USGS 7.5' topographic map Mount Richthofen, Colorado

Braddock Peak is a mountain summit in the Never Summer Mountains range of the Rocky Mountains of North America. The 11,972-foot (3,649 m) peak is located in State Forest State Park, 3.0 miles (4.8 km) south-southwest (bearing 201°) of Cameron Pass in Jackson County, Colorado, United States.

== Mountain ==
Braddock Peak lies 1.3 miles (2.1 km) east-northeast of Seven Utes Mountain, 1.3 miles (2.1 km) west of Snow Lake, and 1.7 miles (2.7 km) north of the boundary of Routt National Forest and the Never Summer Wilderness.

It is named after Dr. William A. Braddock (1929–2003), Professor of Geological Sciences at the University of Colorado at Boulder from 1958 to 1994. Dr. Braddock and his students geologically mapped over 750 square miles (1,900 km^{2}) of the northern Front Range, including the summit named after him. He was the principal author of The Geologic Map of Rocky Mountain National Park. Following his retirement, Dr. Braddock taught the lay public about the geology in and around Rocky Mountain National Park.

Descriptions of hiking routes in this area that predate adoption of the Braddock Peak name refer to this summit as Point 11,960.

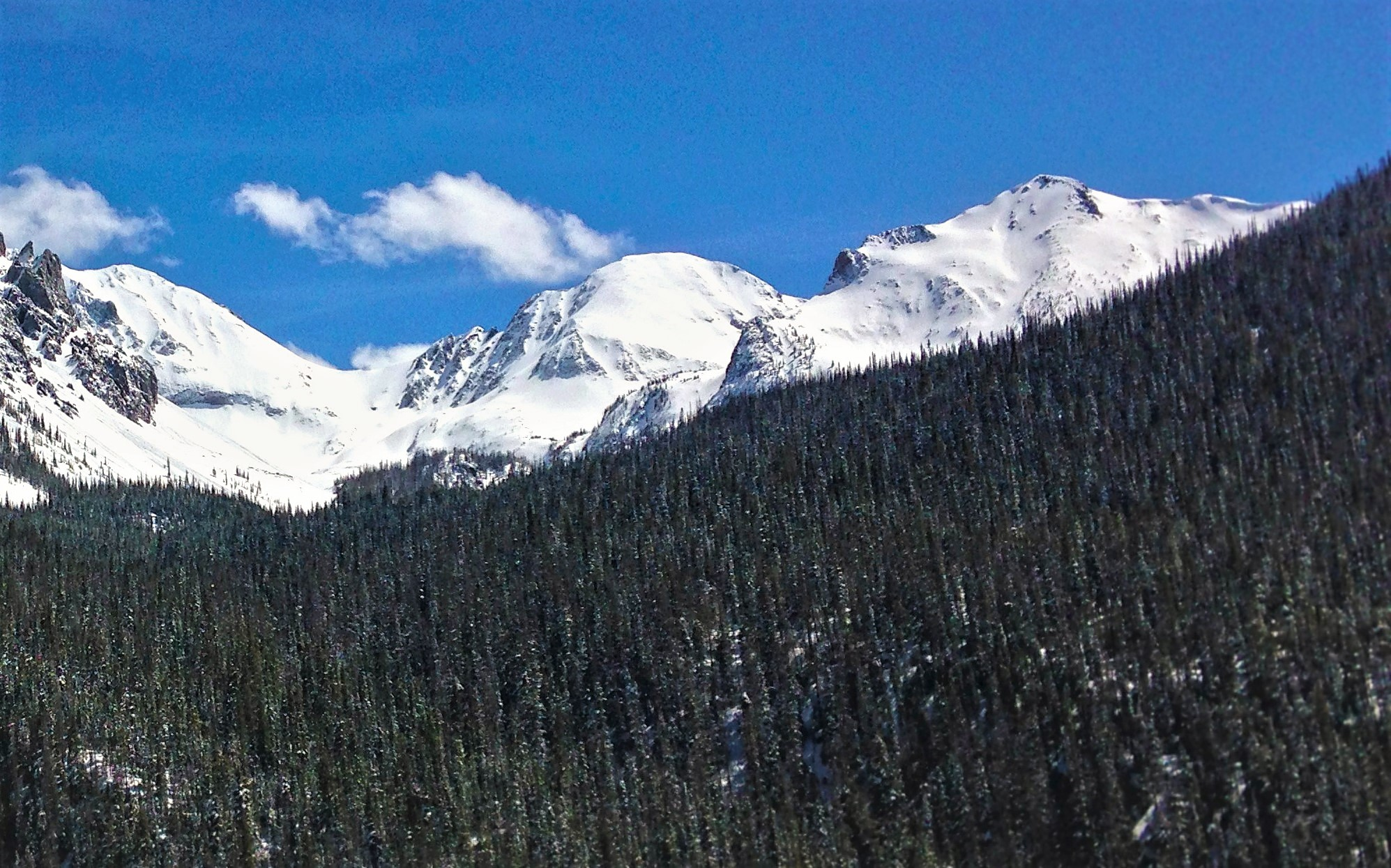
Mt. Mahler (center), Braddock Peak (right)

== See also ==
- List of Colorado mountain ranges
- List of Colorado mountain summits
  - List of Colorado fourteeners
  - List of Colorado 4000 meter prominent summits
  - List of the most prominent summits of Colorado
- List of Colorado county high points
