= Bowen Mountain =

Bowen Mountain, Mount Bowen, Bowenmount, may refer to:

- Bowen Mountain, New South Wales, Australia; a town
  - Bowen Mountain, a gravity hill on Bowen Mountain Road, Bowen Mountain, NSW, AUS; see List of gravity hills
- Mount Bowen (Queensland), Hinchinbrook Island National Park, Hinchinbrook Island, Cassowary Coast, Queensland, Australia; a mountain
- Mount Bowen, a hill in Eketāhuna, Tararua, Manawatū-Whanganui, North Island, New Zealand; see List of radio stations in Wellington
- Bowen Mountain (Colorado), U.S.A.; a mountain
- Mount Bowen, a peak on Mount Joyce, Prince Albert Mountains, Victoria Land, Antarctica

== See also ==
- Bowen (disambiguation)
