= Seven Utes Mountain =

Mountain in Colorado, United States

- Location within Colorado

Highest point
- Elevation: 11,478 ft (3,498 m)
- Prominence: 493 ft (150 m)
- Parent peak: Mount Mahler (12,428 ft)
- Isolation: 1.42 mi (2.29 km)
- Coordinates: 40°28′42″N 105°56′05″W

Geography
- Location: Jackson County, Colorado, U.S.
- Parent range: Never Summer Range
- Topo map(s): USGS 7.5' topographic map Mount Richthofen, Colorado

Seven Utes Mountain, elevation 11,478 ft (3,498 m), is a summit in the Never Summer Mountains of northern Colorado, United States. The mountain is located in Jackson County in the Colorado State Forest, 2.2 miles (3.5 km) west-northwest of Mount Richthofen.

== See also ==
- List of Colorado mountain ranges
- List of Colorado mountain summits
  - List of Colorado fourteeners
  - List of Colorado 4000 meter prominent summits
  - List of the most prominent summits of Colorado
- List of Colorado county high points
