= Lulu Mountain =

Mountain in Colorado, United States

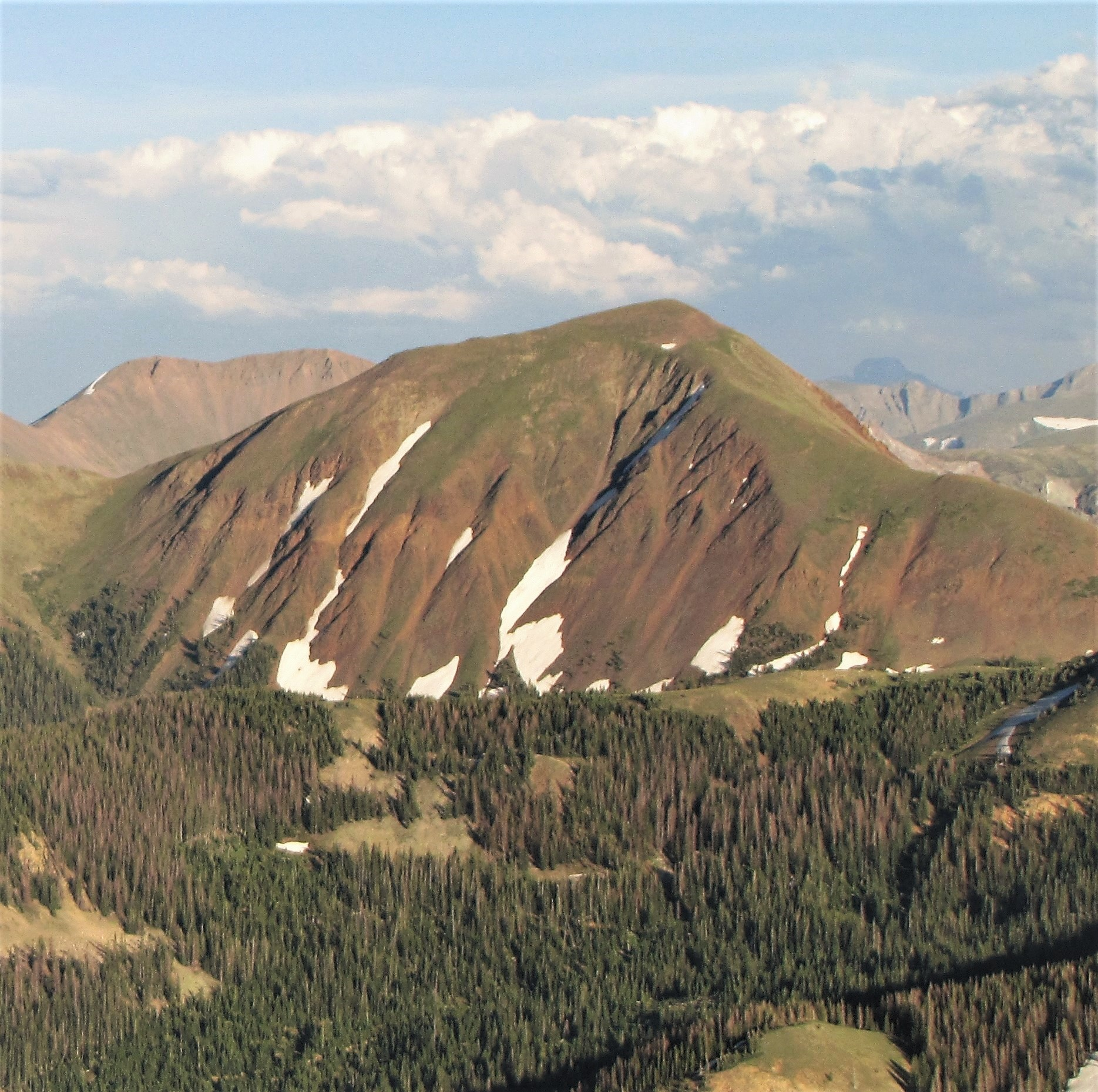
- Northwest aspect

Highest point
- Elevation: 12,217 ft (3,724 m)
- Prominence: 887 ft (270 m)
- Parent peak: Mount Richthofen (12,945 ft)
- Isolation: 1.63 mi (2.62 km)
- Coordinates: 40°28′48″N 105°51′45″W

Geography
- Location within Colorado Location within the United States
- Country: United States
- State: Colorado
- County: Grand County / Jackson County
- Protected area: Rocky Mountain National Park
- Parent range: Rocky Mountains; Never Summer Mountains
- Topo map: USGS Fall River Pass

Geology
- Rock age: Oligocene
- Rock type: Andesite breccia

Climbing
- Easiest route: class 2 via Thunder Pass

Lulu Mountain is a 12,217-foot-elevation (3,724-meter) summit in Colorado, United States.

== Description ==
Lulu Mountain is situated on the Continental Divide along the boundary shared by Grand County and Jackson County. It is the 20th-highest peak of the Never Summer Mountains which are a subrange of the Rocky Mountains. The mountain is situated on the boundary that Rocky Mountain National Park shares with Medicine Bow–Routt National Forest. Precipitation runoff from the mountain's north slope drains into the headwaters of the Michigan River, whereas the south slope drains into headwaters of the Colorado River except for a portion which is diverted by the Grand Ditch. Topographic relief is significant as the summit rises 2,600 feet (790 meters) above the Colorado River in 1.75 miles (2.82 km) and 1,400 feet (430 meters) above the Michigan River in one-half mile (0.8 km).

== Climate ==
According to the Köppen climate classification system, Lulu Mountain is located in an alpine subarctic climate zone with cold, snowy winters, and cool to warm summers. Due to its altitude, it receives precipitation all year, as snow in winter and as thunderstorms in summer, with a dry period in late spring. Climbers can expect afternoon rain, hail, and lightning from the seasonal monsoon in late July and August.

== Etymology ==
The mountain is immediately north of the mining boom town of Lulu City that sprang up in 1880 and was abandoned by 1886. The town was built primarily by the Middle Park and Grand River Land Improvement Company which was backed by Benjamin Franklin Burnett of Fort Collins. The town was named by Burnett for his daughter, Lulu, who was considered quite beautiful in her youth. At the recommendation of the US Forest Service, the mountain's toponym was officially adopted in 1929 by the United States Board on Geographic Names.

== Geology ==
Lulu Mountain is a remnant of a volcano which erupted approximately 28 million years ago. The rock is composed of andesite breccia.

== Gallery ==
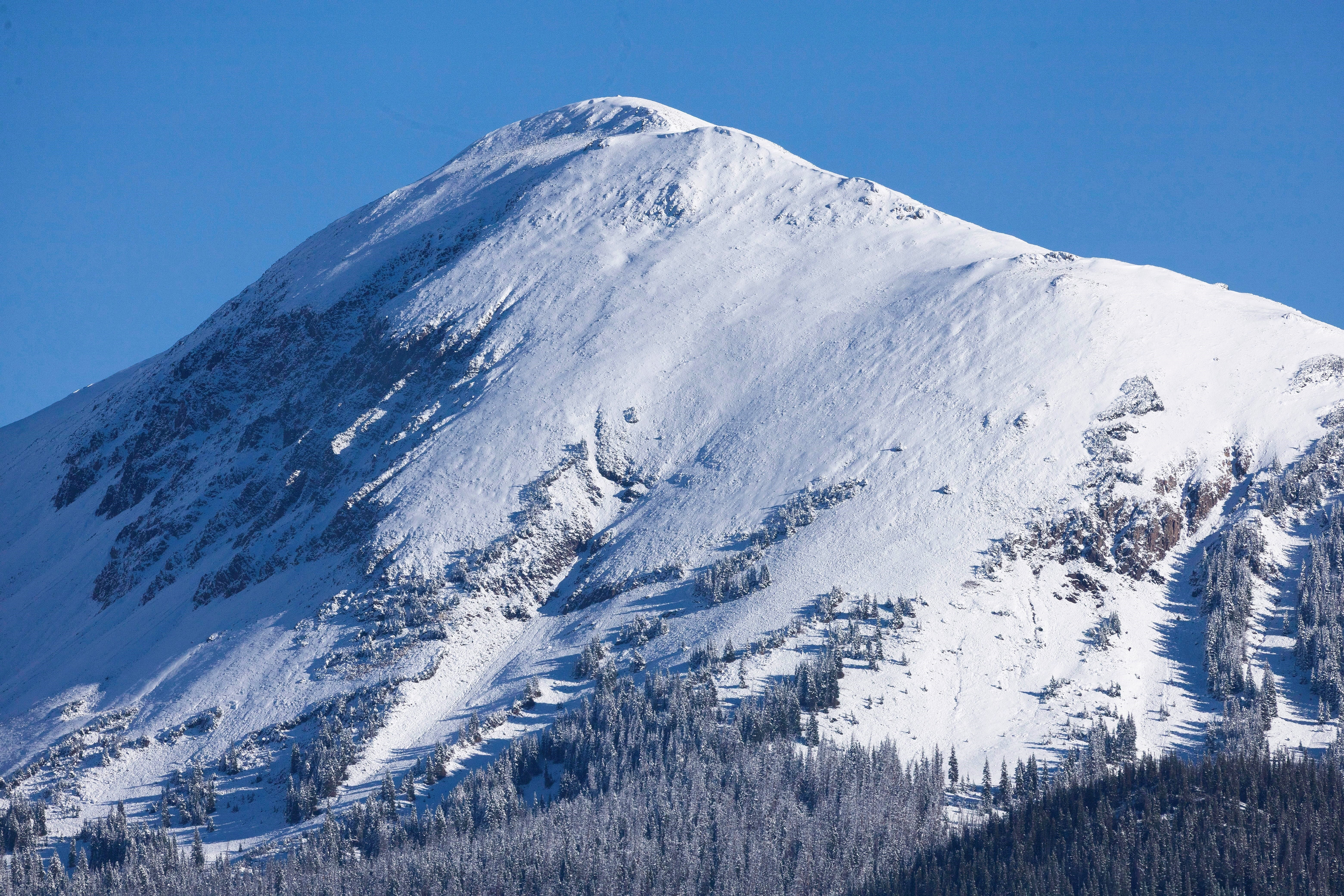
South aspect

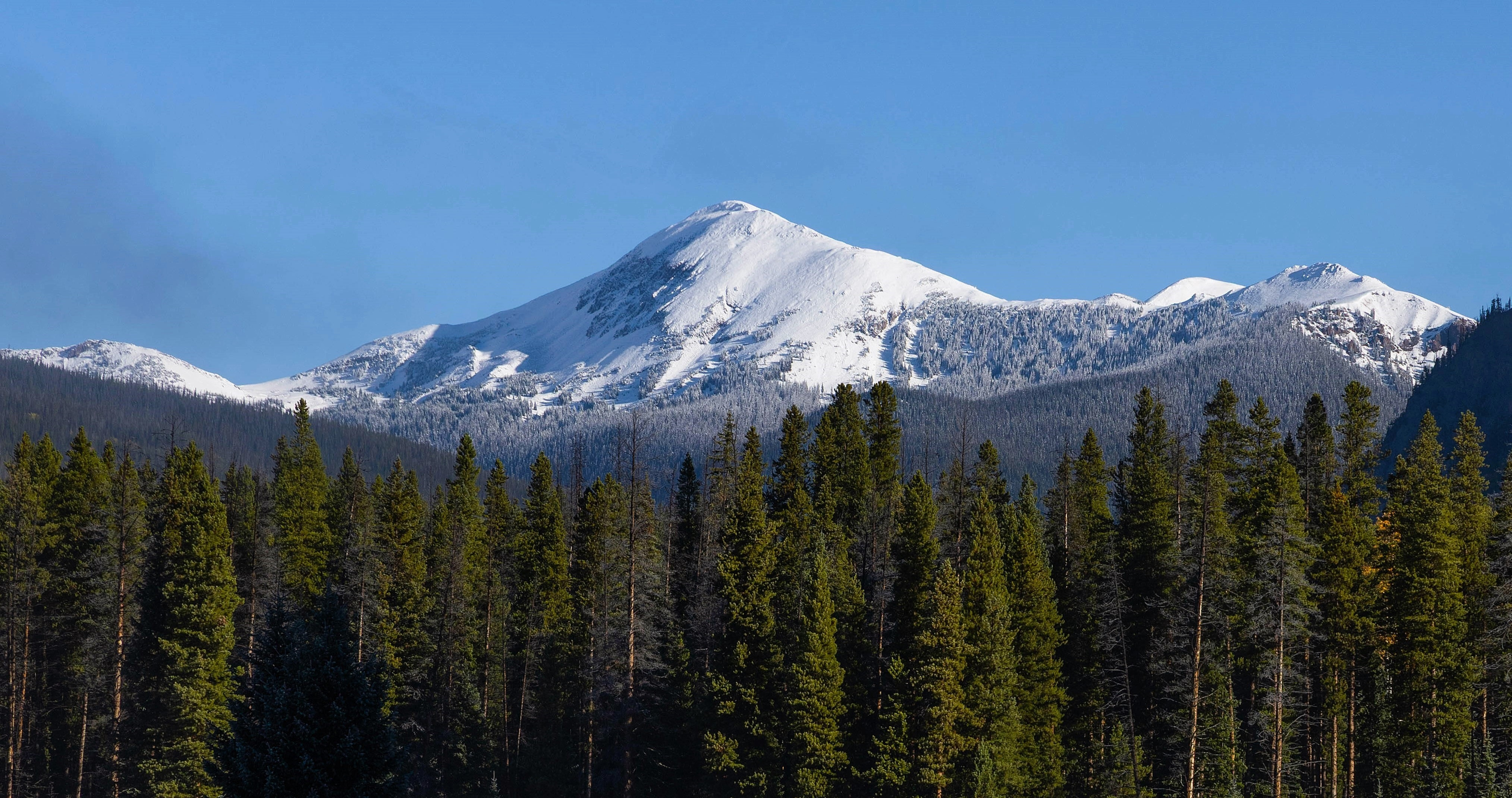
South aspect

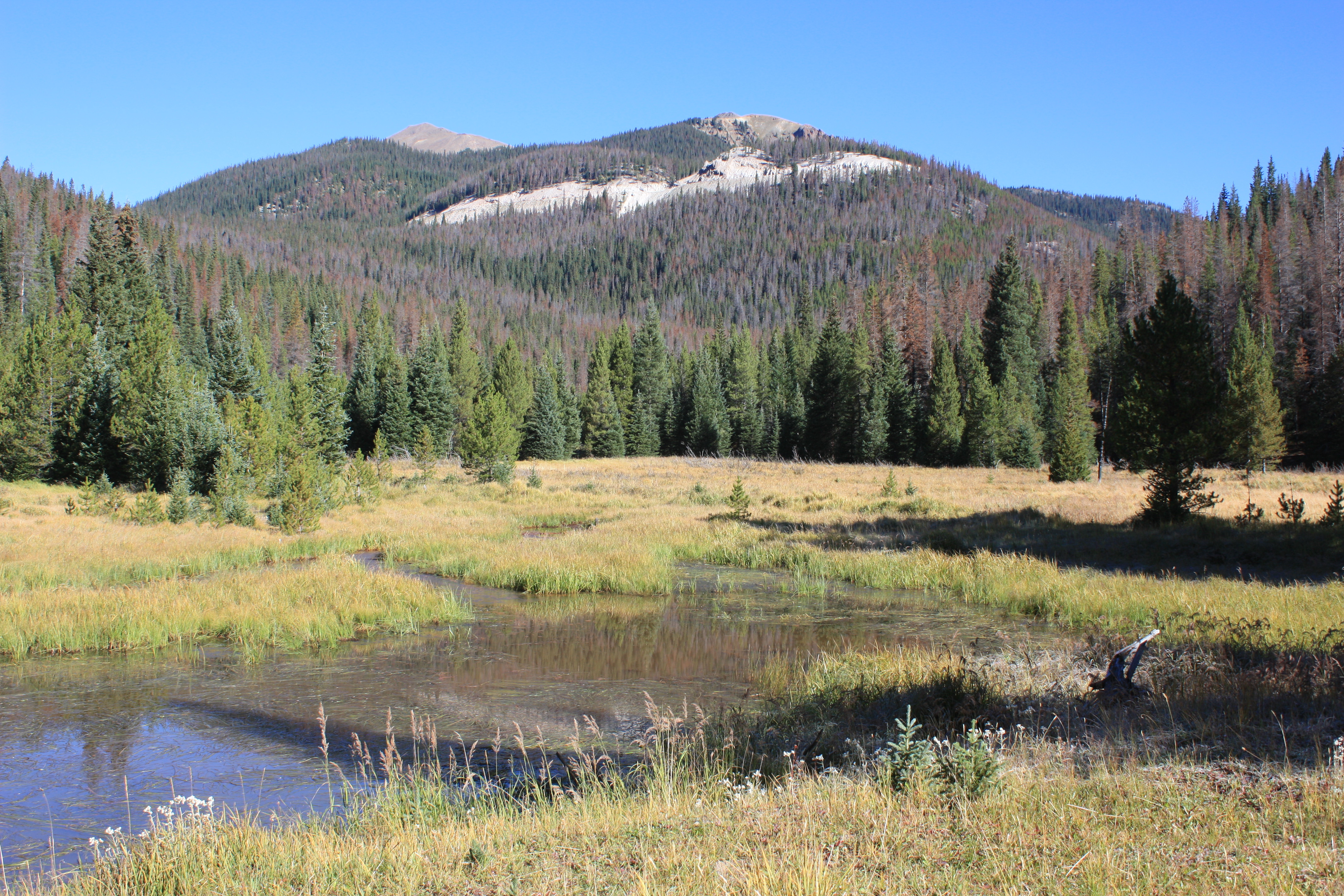
Lulu City town site

== See also ==
- List of peaks in Rocky Mountain National Park
- Mountains of Grand County, Colorado
- Mountains of Jackson County, Colorado
