= Never Summer Peak =

Mountain in Colorado, United States

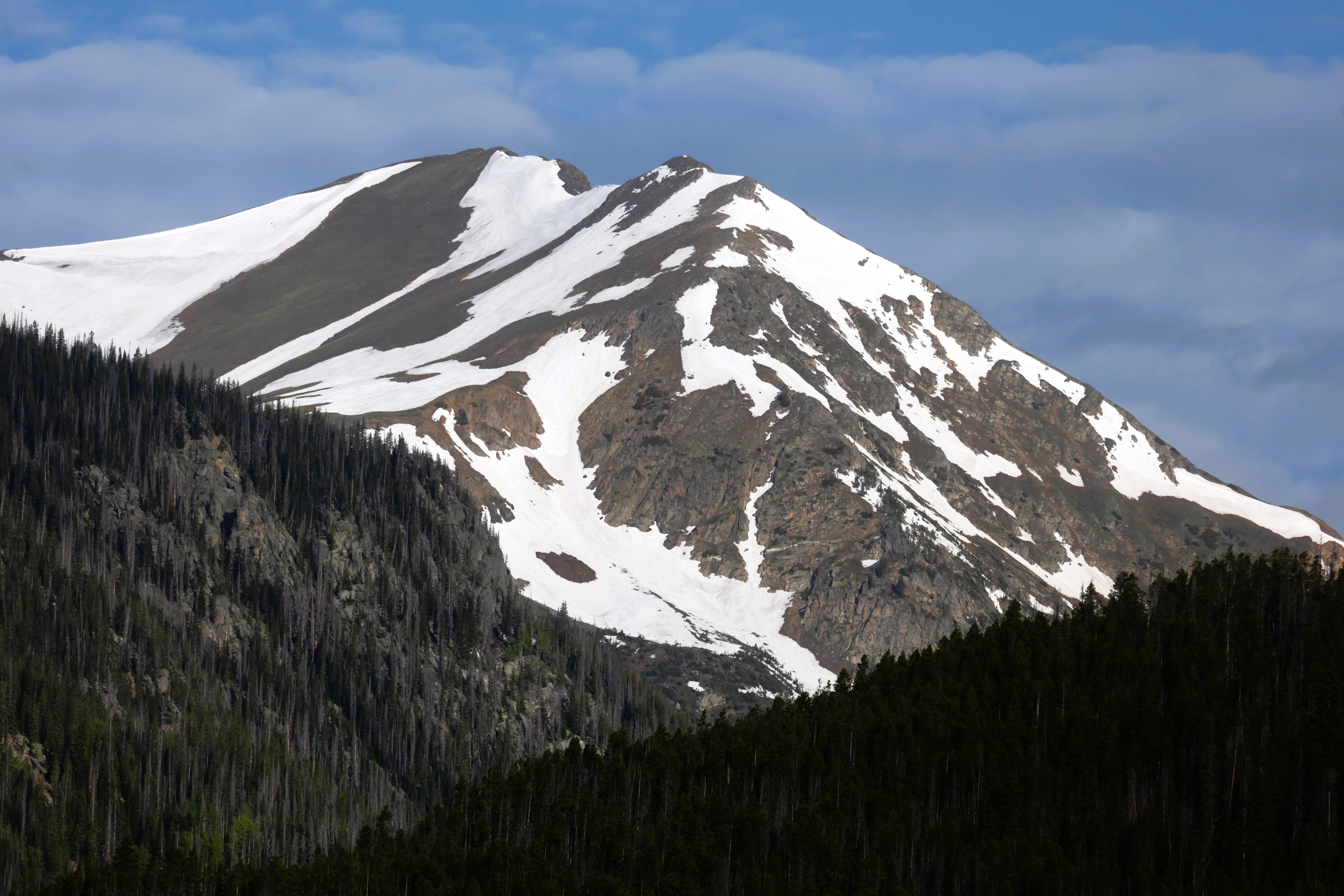
- East aspect, from Kawuneeche Valley

Highest point
- Elevation: 12,452 ft (3,795 m)
- Prominence: 278 ft (85 m)
- Parent peak: Bowen Mountain (12,524 ft)
- Isolation: 0.82 mi (1.32 km)
- Coordinates: 40°22′19″N 105°56′14″W

Geography
- Location within Colorado Location within the United States
- Country: United States
- State: Colorado
- County: Grand / Jackson
- Protected area: Never Summer Wilderness
- Parent range: Rocky Mountains; Never Summer Mountains
- Topo map: USGS Bowen Mountain

Geology
- Rock age: Paleoproterozoic
- Mountain type: Fault block
- Rock type(s): Hornblende Gneiss, Amphibolite

Climbing
- Easiest route: hiking class 2

Never Summer Peak is a 12,452-foot-elevation (3,795-meter) mountain summit in Colorado, United States.

== Description ==
Never Summer Peak is situated on the Continental Divide along the boundary shared by Grand County and Jackson County. The west side of the peak is in the Medicine Bow–Routt National Forest and the east side is in the Never Summer Wilderness. Precipitation runoff from the mountain's west slope drains into headwaters of the Illinois River, with the east slope draining to the Colorado River via Baker Gulch. The counterintuitive direction of water flow is because the Continental Divide forms a loop in this area, whereby the peak's west slope runoff flows to the Atlantic Ocean and the east slope to the Pacific. Topographic relief is significant as the summit rises 2,050 feet (625 meters) above Baker Gulch in one mile (1.6 km) and 1,050 feet (320 meters) above Parika Lake in 0.6 miles (0.97 km). The mountain's toponym has not been officially adopted by the United States Board on Geographic Names.

== Climate ==
According to the Köppen climate classification system, Never Summer Peak is located in an alpine subarctic climate zone with cold, snowy winters, and cool to warm summers. Due to its altitude, it receives precipitation all year, as snow in winter, and as thunderstorms in summer, with a dry period in late spring.

== See also ==
- Mountains of Grand County, Colorado
- Mountains of Jackson County, Colorado
