= Justice Bowen =

Justice Bowen may refer to:

- Charles Bowen, Baron Bowen (1835–1894), Lord Justice of Appeal of England
- Jabez Bowen (1739–1815), chief justice of the Rhode Island Supreme Court
- Ozias Bowen (1805–1871), associate justice of the Ohio Supreme Court
- Thomas M. Bowen (1835–1906), associate justice of the Arkansas Supreme Court
- William H. Bowen (1923–2014), associate justice of the Arkansas Supreme Court

== See also ==
- Judge Bowen (disambiguation)
- Bowen (disambiguation)
- Bowen (surname)
