= Iron Mountain (Never Summer Mountains) =

Peak in the Never Summer Mountains, Colorado, USA

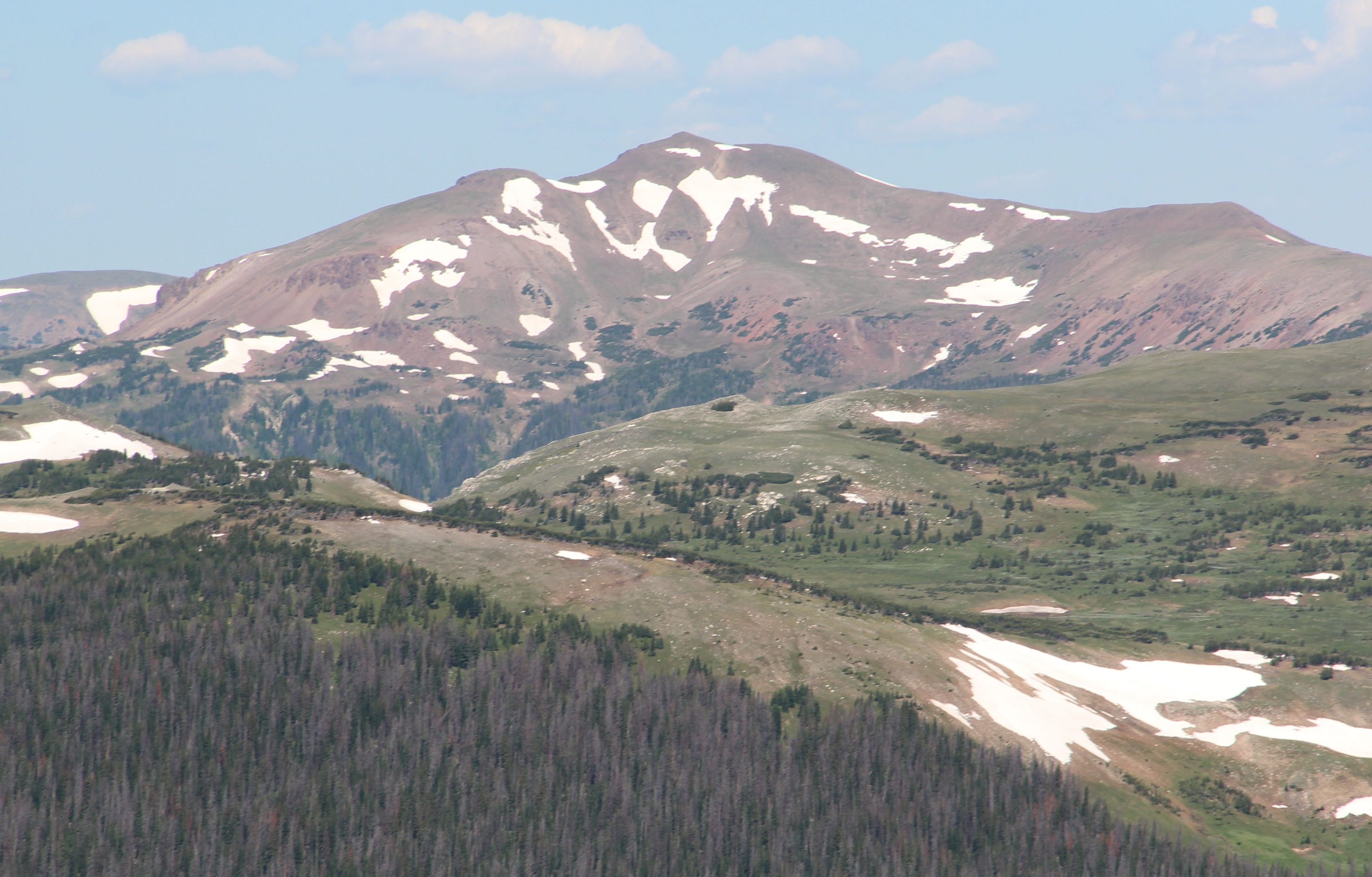
- Iron Mountain viewed from Rocky Mountain National Park

Highest point
- Elevation: 12,270 ft (3,740 m)
- Prominence: 1,005 ft (306 m)
- Isolation: 3.40 mi (5.47 km)
- Coordinates: 40°30′25″N 105°51′07″W

Geography
- Location within Colorado
- Location: Jackson and Larimer counties, Colorado, United States
- Parent range: Never Summer Mountains
- Topo map(s): USGS 7.5' topographic map Chambers Lake, Colorado

Iron Mountain is a mountain summit in the Never Summer Mountains of the Rocky Mountains of North America. The 12,270-foot (3,740 m) peak is located 2.4 miles (3.8 km) east-southeast (bearing 114°) of the Cameron Pass, Colorado, United States, on the drainage divide separating State Forest State Park and Jackson County from Roosevelt National Forest and Larimer County.

== See also ==
- List of Colorado mountain ranges
- List of Colorado mountain summits
  - List of Colorado fourteeners
  - List of Colorado 4000 meter prominent summits
  - List of the most prominent summits of Colorado
- List of Colorado county high points
