= Bowen Park =

Bowen Park may refer to:

- Bowen Park, Brisbane, a historic area in Bowen Hills, Queensland, Australia
- Bowen Park (Waukegan), a historic park in Waukegan, Illinois, United States

== See also ==
- Bowne Park, Queens, New York, United States
- Bowen (disambiguation)
