= Judge Bowen =

Judge Bowen may refer to:

- Dudley Hollingsworth Bowen Jr. (born 1941), judge of the United States District Court for the Southern District of Georgia
- John Clyde Bowen (1888–1978), judge of the United States District Court for the Western District of Washington

== See also ==
- Justice Bowen (disambiguation)
- Bowen (disambiguation)
- Bowen (surname)
