= Green Knoll =

Mountain in Colorado, United States

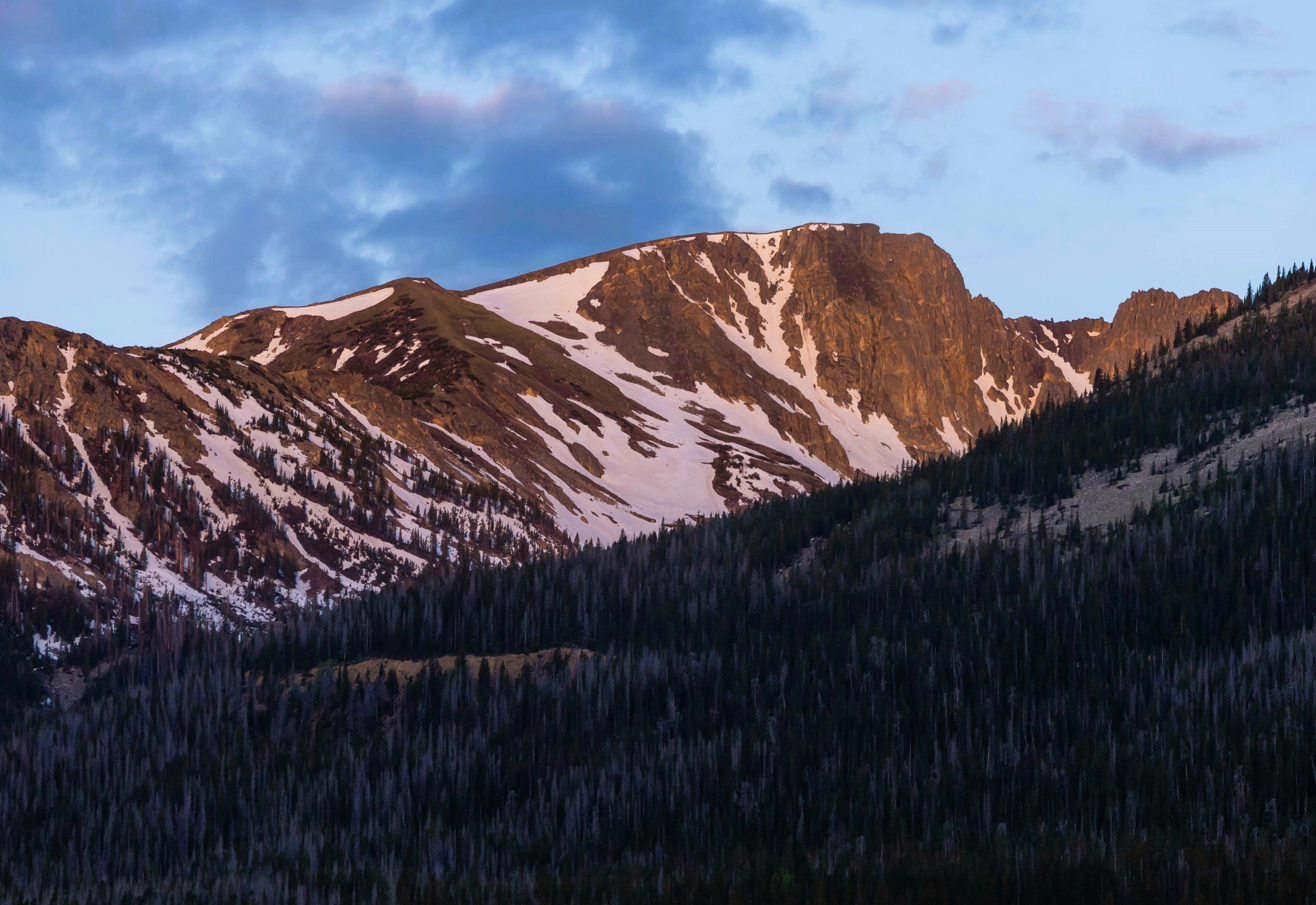
- Northeast aspect

Highest point
- Elevation: 12,297 ft (3,748 m)
- Prominence: 193 ft (59 m)
- Parent peak: Mount Nimbus (12,721 ft)
- Isolation: 0.80 mi (1.29 km)
- Coordinates: 40°23′10″N 105°53′48″W

Geography
- Location within Colorado Location within the United States
- Country: United States
- State: Colorado
- County: Grand County
- Protected area: Rocky Mountain National Park
- Parent range: Rocky Mountains; Never Summer Mountains
- Topo map: USGS Mount Richthofen

Geology
- Rock age: Proterozoic
- Rock type(s): Biotite, Gneiss

Climbing
- Easiest route: class 2 Southeast slope

Green Knoll is a 12,297-foot-elevation (3,748-meter) mountain summit in Grand County, Colorado, United States.

== Description ==
Green Knoll is the 17th-highest peak of the Never Summer Mountains which are a subrange of the Rocky Mountains. The mountain is situated at the western boundary of Rocky Mountain National Park and is visible from Trail Ridge Road within the park. Precipitation runoff from the mountain's slopes drains to the Colorado River except for a portion which is diverted by the Grand Ditch. Topographic relief is significant as the summit rises 3,400 feet (1,036 meters) above the Kawuneeche Valley in 2.25 miles (3.62 km) and 1,300 feet (396 meters) above Red Gulch in one-half mile. The mountain's toponym has been officially adopted by the United States Board on Geographic Names.

== Climate ==
According to the Köppen climate classification system, Green Knoll is located in an alpine subarctic climate zone with cold, snowy winters, and cool to warm summers. Due to its altitude, it receives precipitation all year, as snow in winter, and as thunderstorms in summer, with a dry period in late spring.

== See also ==
- List of peaks in Rocky Mountain National Park
- Mountains of Grand County, Colorado

== Gallery ==
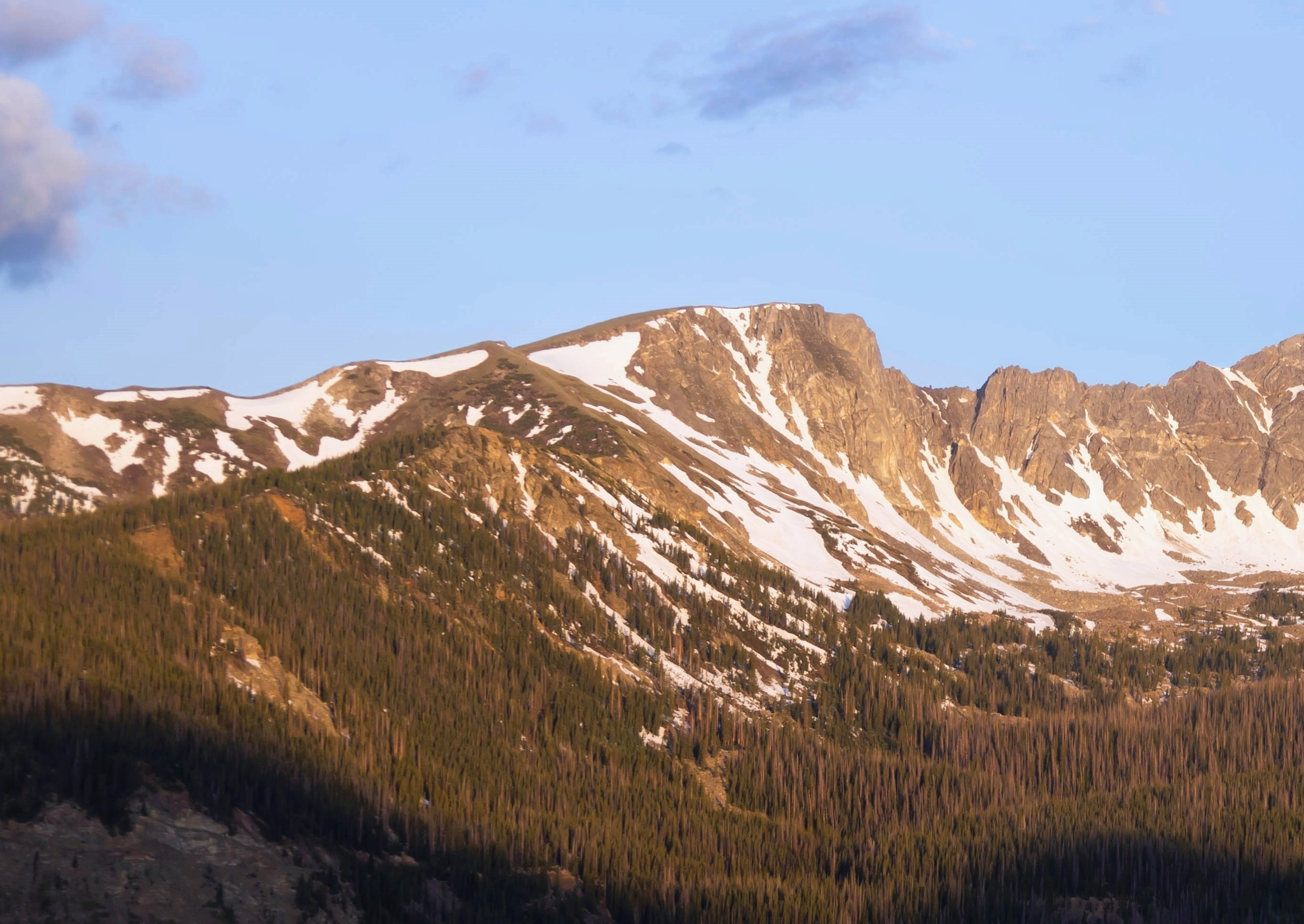
East aspect

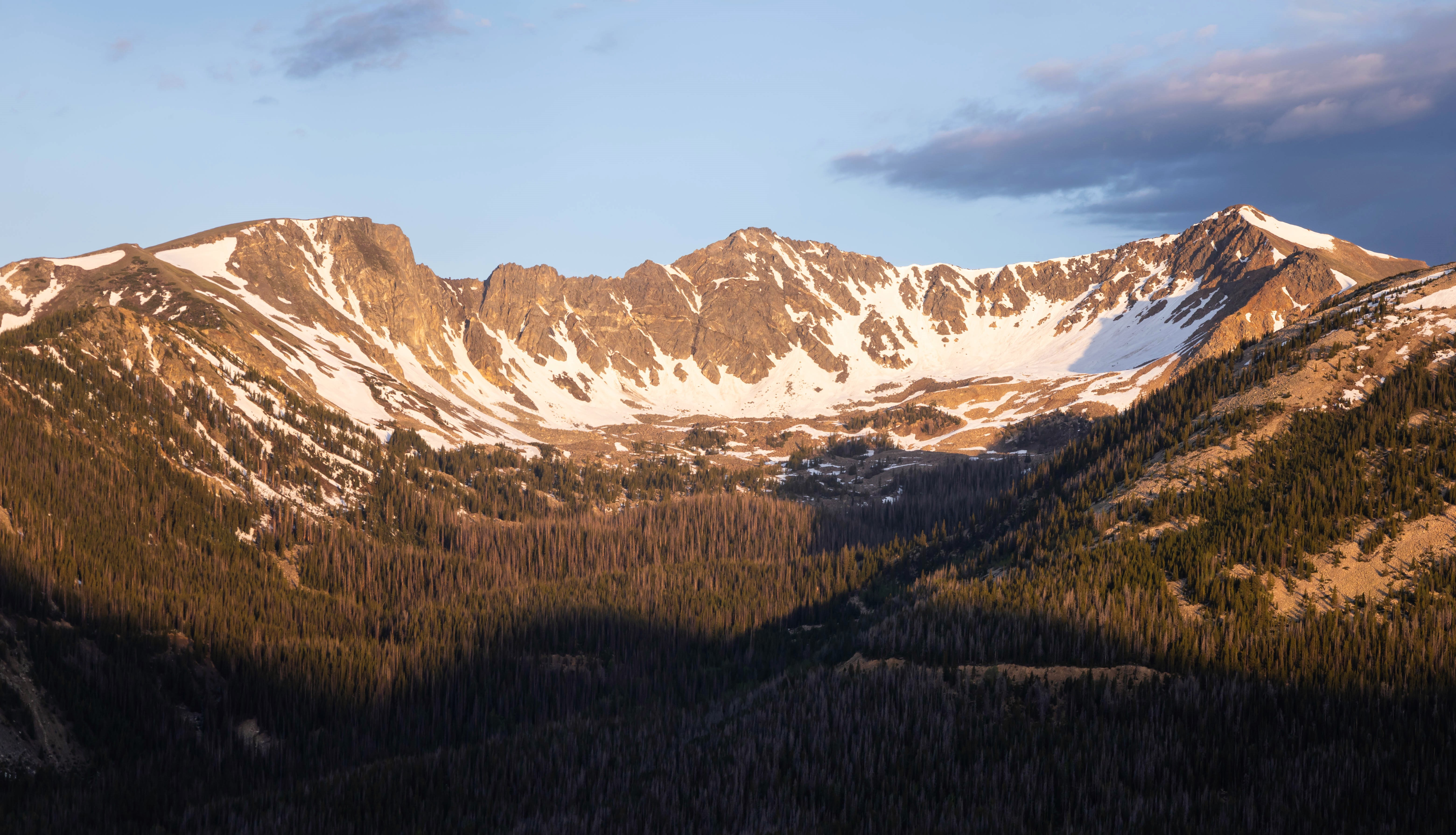
Green Knoll (left), Mount Stratus (center), Mount Nimbus (right).

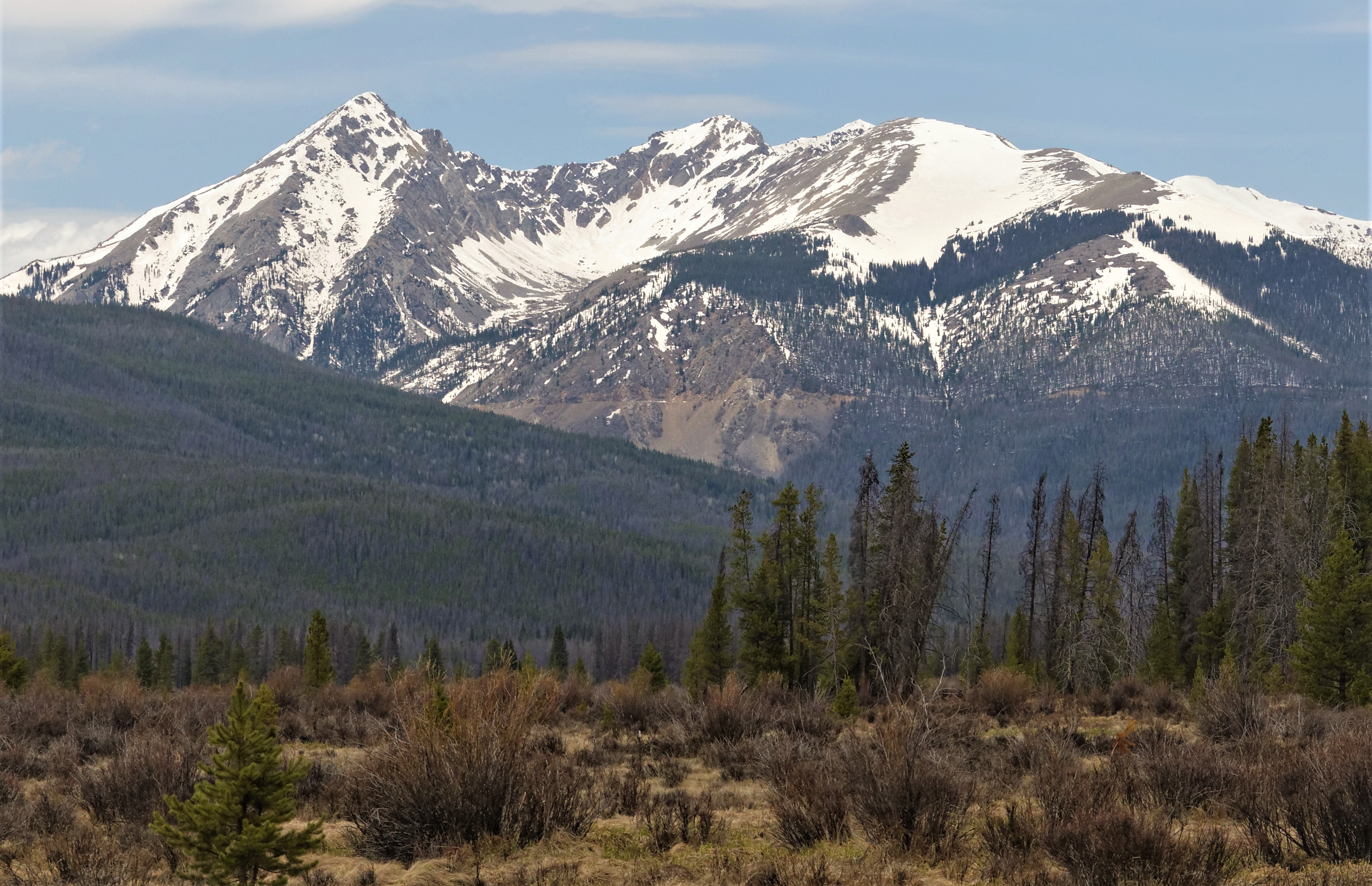
Baker Mountain (left), Mount Stratus (center), Green Knoll (right)

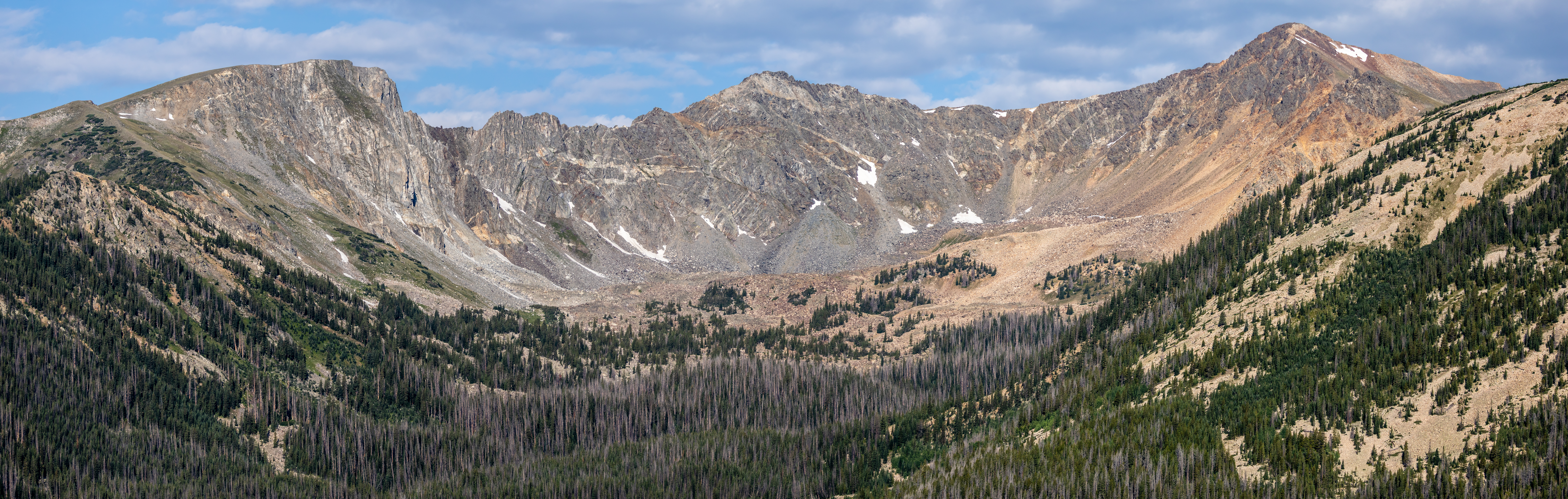
Green Knoll (left), Mount Stratus (center), Mount Nimbus (right)
