= Bowen River =

Bowen River may refer to:

- Bowen River (New Zealand), a river located in New Zealand.
- Bowen River (Queensland), a river located in Queensland, Australia.

== See also ==
- Bowen (disambiguation)
