= Never Summer Mountains =

Mountain range in Colorado, US

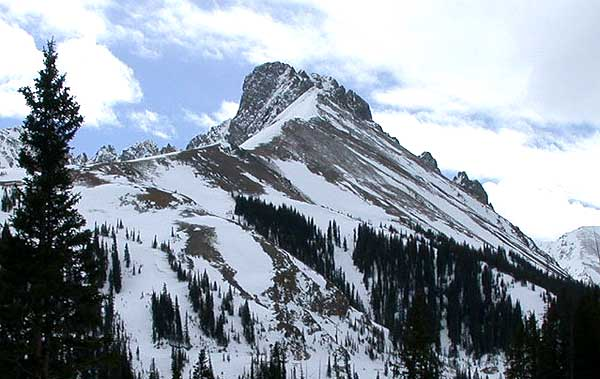
- Nokhu Crags, at the northern end of the Never Summer Mountains

Highest point
- Peak: Mount Richthofen
- Elevation: 12,945 ft (3,946 m)
- Listing: Mountain ranges of Colorado
- Coordinates: 40°28′10″N 105°53′42″W

Dimensions
- Length: 10 mi (16 km) north-south
- Area: 25 mi^{2} (65 km^{2})

Geography
- Location within Colorado
- Country: United States
- State: Colorado
- Counties: Jackson; Grand; Larimer
- Range coordinates: 40°25′27″N 105°53′56″W
- Parent range: Front Range, Rocky Mountains

The Never Summer Mountains (from Arapaho: Ni-chebe-chii) are a mountain range in the Rocky Mountains in north central Colorado in the United States consisting of over twenty named peaks. The range is located along the northwest border of Rocky Mountain National Park, forming an S-turn in the continental divide between the headwaters of the Colorado River in Rocky Mountain National Park and the upper basin of the North Platte River (North Park). The range is small and tall, covering only 25 sq mi (65 km^{2}) with a north–south length of 10 mi (16 km) with over ten distinct peaks rising more than 12,000 ft (3,700 m). The range straddles the Jackson-Grand county line for most of its length, and stretches into Jackson and Larimer county at its northern end. A panoramic view of the range is available from sections of Trail Ridge Road in Rocky Mountain National Park. One of the northernmost peaks, Nokhu Crags, is prominently visible from the west side of Cameron Pass.

== Geology ==
Most rocks in the Never Summer Mountains are younger than the surrounding Rocky Mountains. Volcanic and intrusive processes 24–29 million years ago created the Never Summer and Rabbit Ears Range to the west. Today, what remains are weathered fragments of much larger volcanoes; primarily igneous granitic formations along with preceding metamorphic content. Most of the highest peaks in the range are granodiorite that was uplifted during the Miocene epoch. The range's highest summit, Mount Richthofen, is the remnant of an andesite volcanic plug. The Nokhu Crags in the north are mostly vertically oriented Pierre Shale dating from Cretaceous times. A large thrust fault underneath the Kawuneeche Valley thrust older Precambrian rocks on top of the younger Cretaceous rocks on the east side of the range. The southern peaks are Miocene-aged granite, and finally Precambrian-aged biotite gneiss and schist.

Beginning two million years ago, glaciers began carving the jagged peaks of the Never Summer Mountains. Successive waves of glaciation continued to reshape the mountains until the Pinedale Glaciation ended twelve-thousand years ago.

The peaks are enormous weathered masses of granitic rock heavily covered with green and orange lichens surrounded on all sides by large fields of talus shed from the original peaks. Many alpine lakes are nestled amongst the peaks. Most woody vegetation is low-growing and stunted. Few trees grow at the higher altitudes and Krummholz abounds.

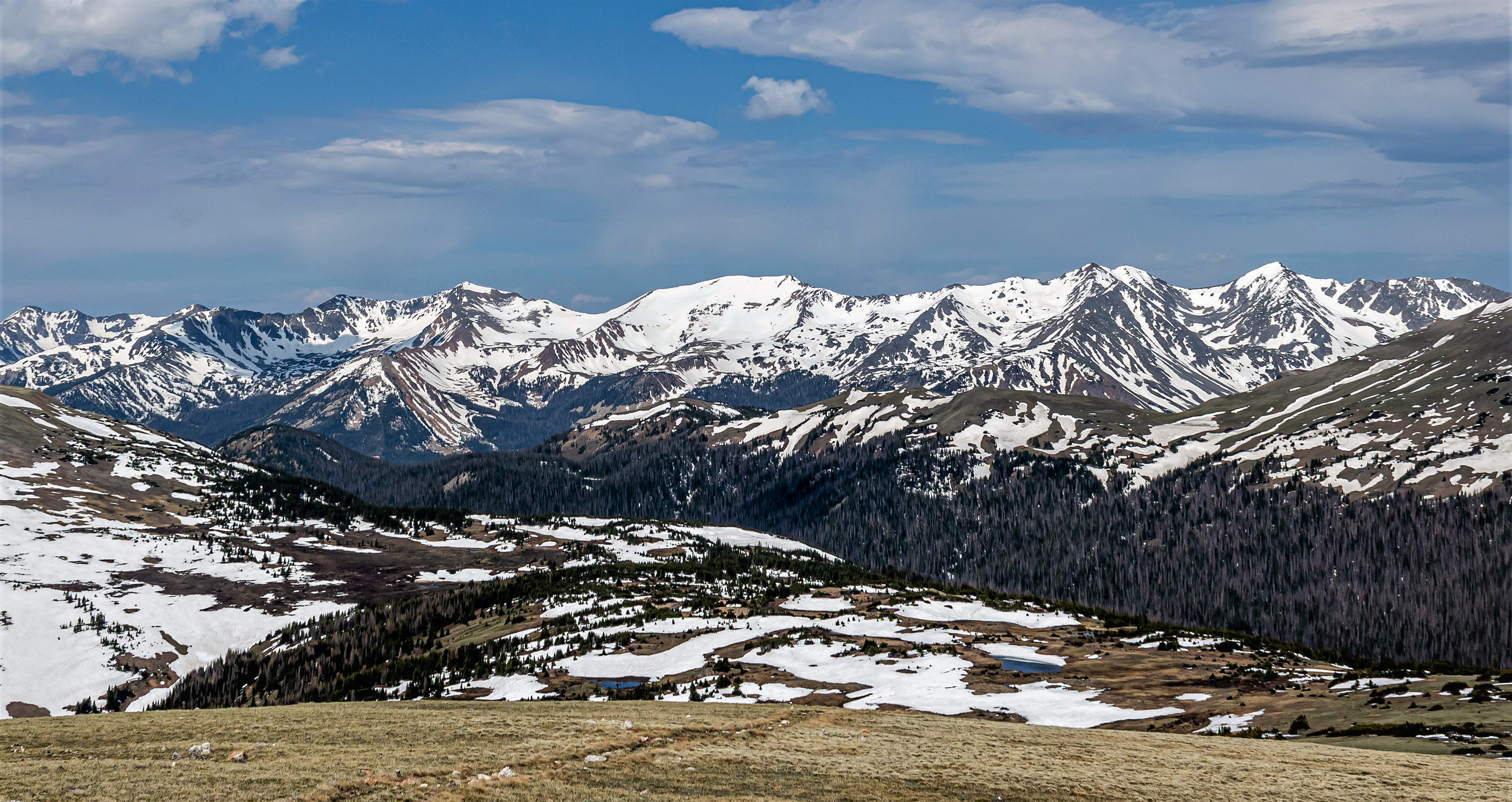
Never Summer Mountains viewed from Trail Ridge Road. Left to rightː Mt. Nimbus, Mt. Cumulus (centered), Howard Mountain, Mt. Cirrus

== History ==
In 1879 prospectors discovered silver on Mount Shipler, starting a small mining rush. A mining town was platted and given the name Lulu City, located at 40°26′44″N 105°50′53″W. Other small settlements were founded in the area, including Dutchtown, located high in Hitchens Gulch. The population swelled as high as 5,000 miners and business owners catering to those miners. However, low grade ore, combined with difficult transportation and lack of a local smelter to process the ore, conspired against the boom. By late 1883 the mining rush ended and the miners moved on. The last miners in Dutchtown left by 1884. Today remnants of the towns and mines are accessible by hiking trails.

In 1890 a project called the Grand Ditch began. The ditch is a 16.2-mile long (26.1 km) water diversion project. Streams and creeks that flow from the highest peaks are diverted into the ditch, which flows over La Poudre pass, delivering the water into the Atlantic Basin for the use of eastern plains farmers. The ditch wasn't completed until 1936. The ditch diverts between 20 and 40% of the runoff from the Never Summer Mountains and significantly impacts the ecology in the valley below. In May 2003 a 100-foot (30 m) section of the ditch breached causing the water to cascade down the slopes and into the Colorado River. The flood left a visible scar on the mountainside.

In 1914, the Colorado Mountain Club brought members of the Arapaho tribe to the region. Tribal members who spent their youth in the area were asked the Arapaho language names for the various peaks, lakes and other geographic features. They called the range Ni-chebe-chii, translated contemporaneously as "Never-No-Summer". The Colorado Geographic Board settled on Never Summer Mountains for the name. The current updated translations are "It is Never Summer" or "Never Summer (Place)".

Many of the peaks in the range are named after cloud types, such as Mount Cirrus and Mount Cumulus.

== Recreation ==
The range is frequented by hikers and backpackers in the summer, and skiers and snowshoers in the winter. The area sees some mountaineering activity, but the rock tends to be rotten (or choss) and the routes are dangerous. The Colorado River Trailhead in Rocky Mountain National Park has trails that lead to the Grand Ditch and remains of Lulu City. Trails from Cameron Pass lead to the Michigan Lakes, Lake Agnes and the Nokhu Crags area. Trails in nearby Routt National Forest lead to the Never Summer Wilderness on the western and southern edges of the range.

== Mountain Peaks ==
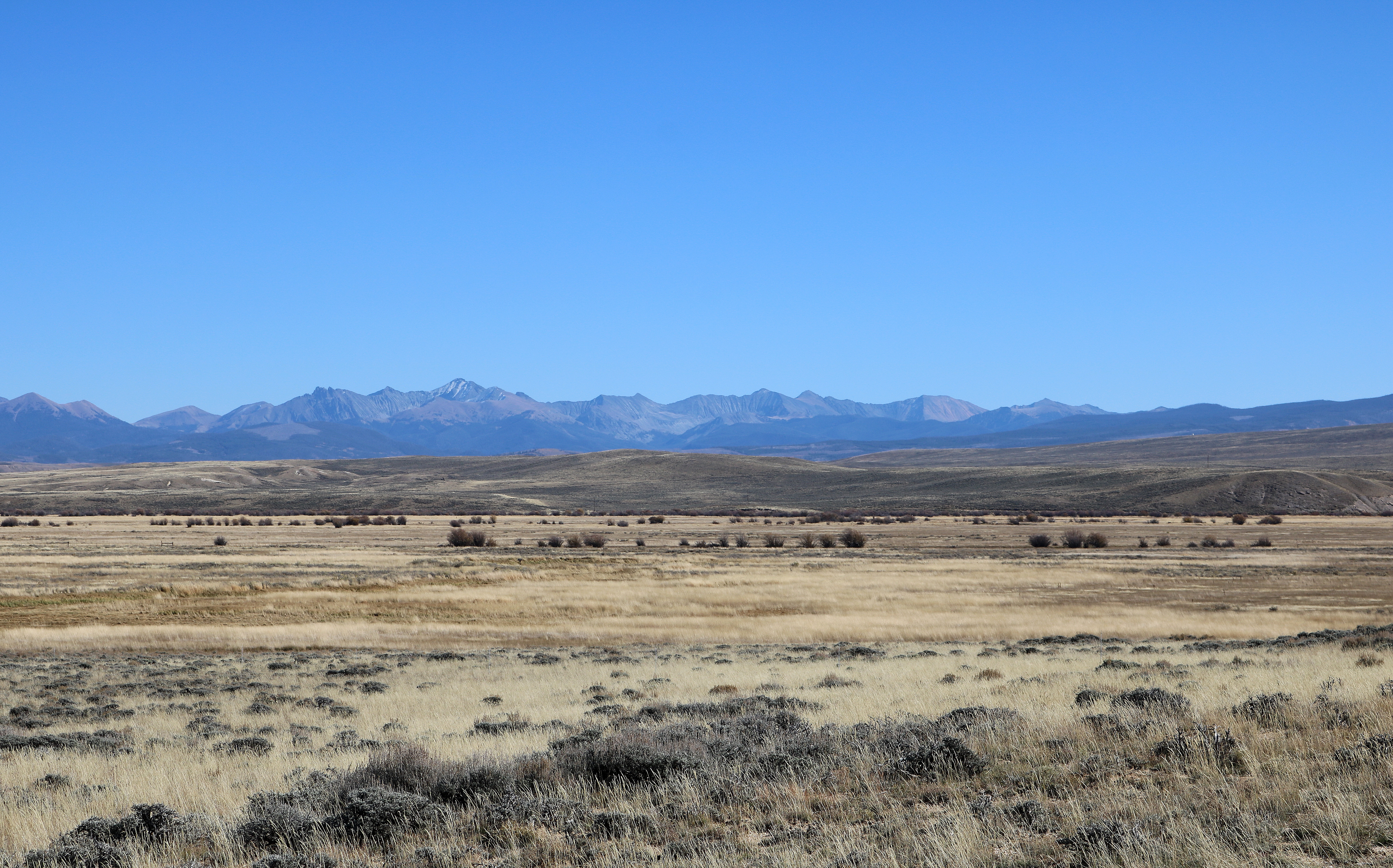
Looking across North Park at the Never Summer Range

1. Baker Mountain
2. Bowen Mountain
3. Braddock Peak previously known as "Bald Mountain"
4. Cascade Mountain
5. Green Knoll
6. Howard Mountain
7. Iron Mountain
8. Jackstraw Mountain
9. Lead Mountain
10. Little Yellowstone
11. Lulu Mountain
12. Mineral Point
13. Mount Cindy
14. Mount Cirrus
15. Mount Cumulus
16. Mount Mahler
17. Mount Nimbus
18. Mount Neota
19. Mount Richthofen
20. Mount Stratus
21. Never Summer Peak
22. Nokhu Crags
23. Parika Peak
24. Porphyry Peak
25. Radial Mountain
26. Red Mountain
27. Ruby Mountain
28. Seven Utes Mountain
29. Specimen Mountain
30. Static Peak
31. Teepee Mountain (Summit post.org)
32. Thunder Mountain (SummitPost.org)

== Adjacent Peaks ==
1. Shipler Mountain
