= Bowen, Nebraska =

- Ghost Town
- Country: United States
- State: Nebraska
- County: Sioux

Bowen is a ghost town in Sioux County, Nebraska, United States.

== History ==
Bowen was platted in 1886. It was named for John S. Bowen, a pioneer settler.
