= Mount Richthofen =

Mountain in Colorado, United States

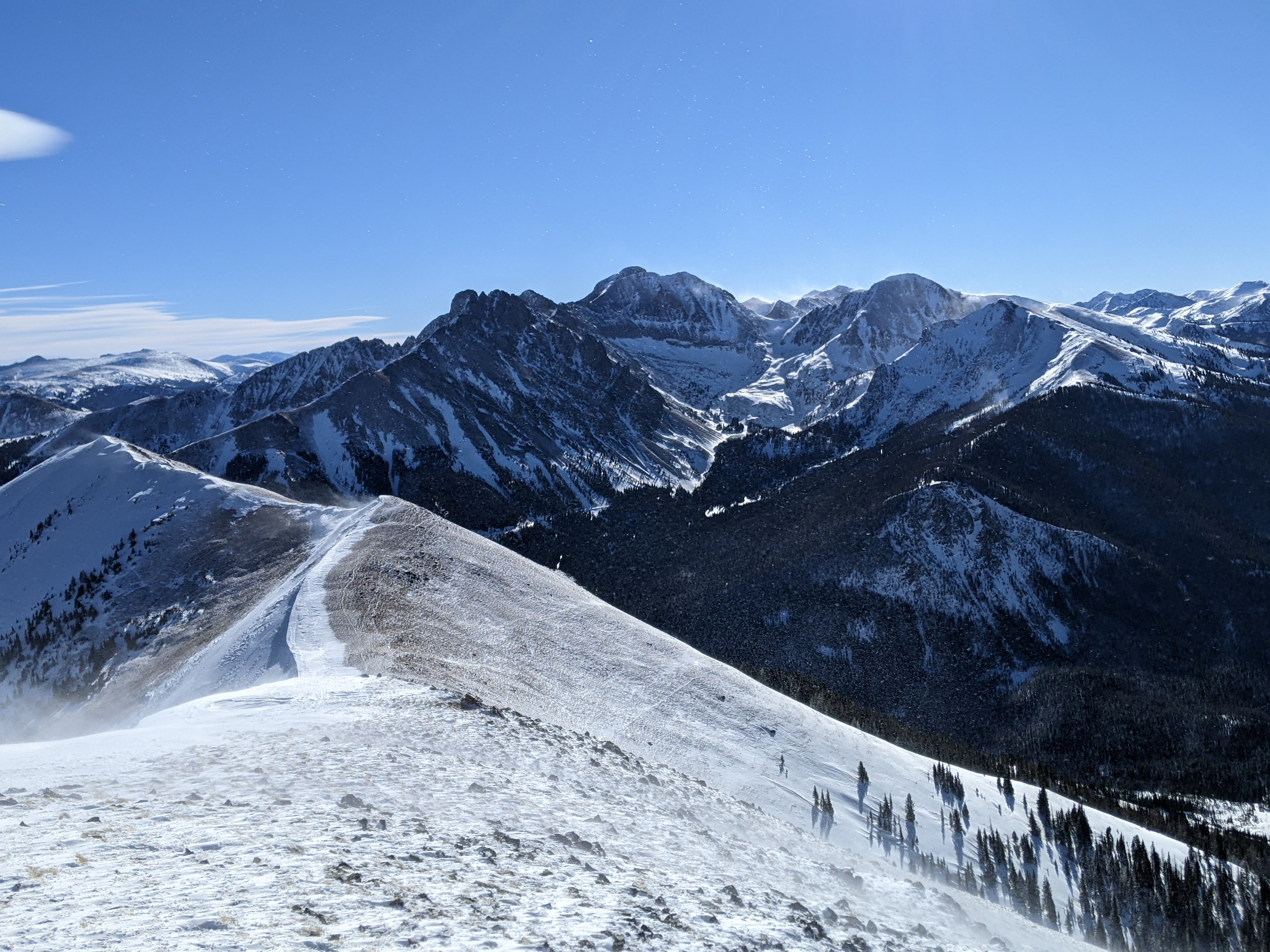
- Mount Richthofen, the high mountain in the center, as seen from Diamond Peaks to the north.

Highest point
- Elevation: 12,945 ft (3,946 m)
- Prominence: 2,680 ft (817 m)
- Isolation: 9.66 mi (15.55 km)
- Listing: Colorado prominent summits Colorado range high points
- Coordinates: 40°28′10″N 105°53′42″W

Naming
- Etymology: Ferdinand von Richthofen

Geography
- Location within Colorado
- Location: Continental Divide between Rocky Mountain National Park in Grand County and Jackson County, Colorado, United States
- Parent range: Highest summit of the Never Summer Mountains
- Topo map(s): USGS 7.5' topographic map Mount Richthofen, Colorado

Geology
- Rock age: 20-25 myo
- Mountain type: Andesite

Climbing
- First ascent: William S. Cooper 1908
- Easiest route: class 3 scramble

Mount Richthofen is the highest summit of the Never Summer Mountains range of the Rocky Mountains of North America. The prominent 12,945-foot (3,946 m) peak is located 5.6 miles (9.0 km) northwest by west (bearing 308°) of Milner Pass, Colorado, United States, on the Continental Divide separating the Rocky Mountain National Park Wilderness in Rocky Mountain National Park and Grand County from Routt National Forest and Jackson County. The mountain was named in honor of pioneering German geologist Baron Ferdinand von Richthofen, apparently by Clarence King's 1870 survey team.

== Mountain ==
Needles and Grenadiers explorer William S. Cooper climbed Mount Richthofen by himself in 1908 in what is presumed to be the first ascent. No sign of previous climbers were present at that time.

Today, the mountain is typically climbed from Lake Agnes to the north, easily reachable from Cameron Pass. The mountain is a steep Class 3 climb that often requires travel on steep scree slopes that are not very stable.

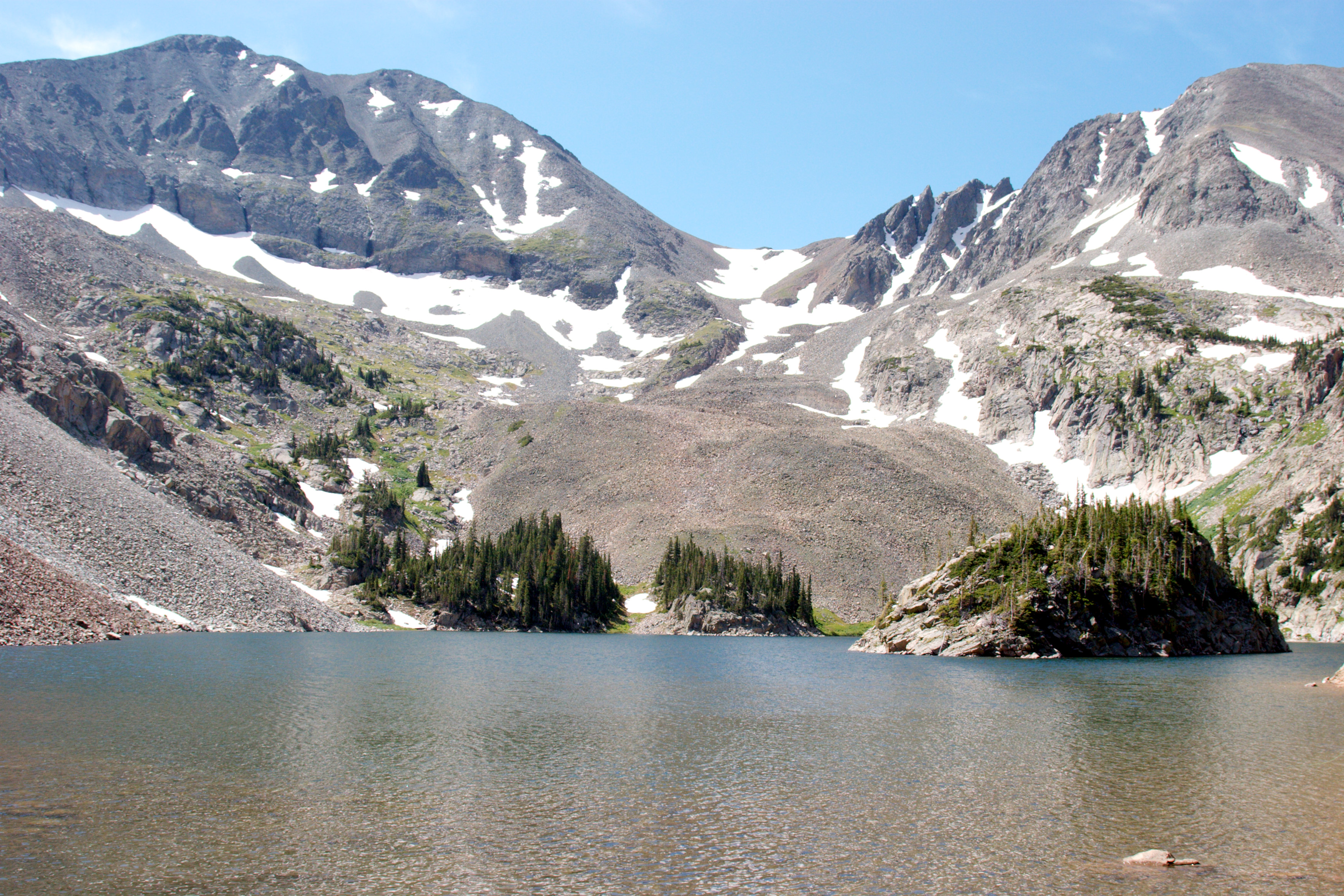
Mount Richthofen (left), Mount Mahler (right), viewed from Lake Agnes

== Climate ==
According to the Köppen climate classification system, the mountain is located in an alpine subarctic climate zone with cold, snowy winters, and cool to warm summers. Due to its altitude, it receives precipitation all year, as snow in winter, and as thunderstorms in summer, with a dry period in late spring.

== See also ==
- List of Colorado mountain ranges
- List of Colorado mountain summits
  - List of Colorado fourteeners
  - List of Colorado 4000 meter prominent summits
  - List of the most prominent summits of Colorado
- List of Colorado county high points
