= Mount Mahler =

Mountain in the American state of Colorado

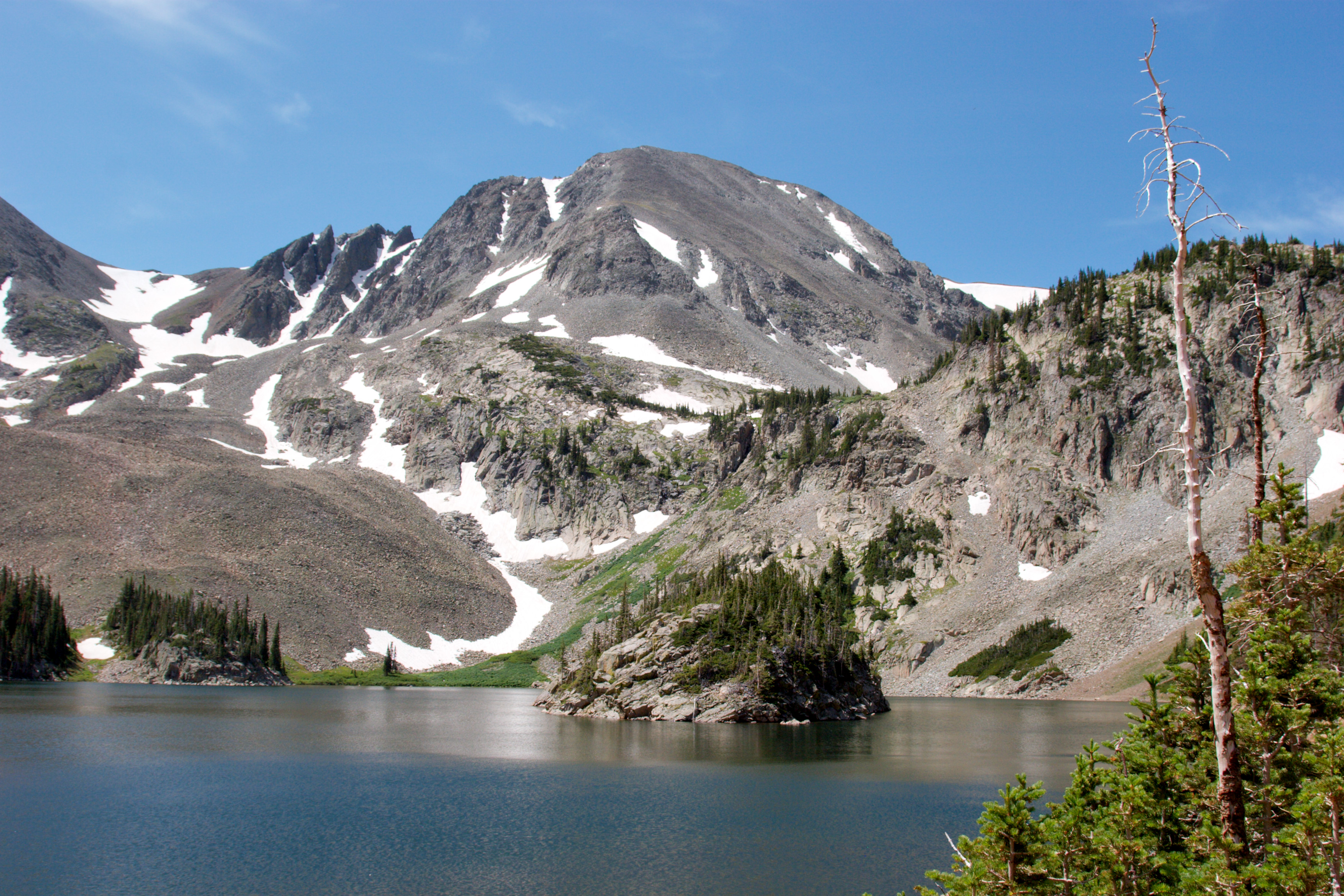
- North aspect, from Lake Agnes

Highest point
- Elevation: 12,497 ft (3,809 m)
- Prominence: 514 ft (157 m)
- Parent peak: Mount Richthofen (12,945 ft)
- Isolation: 0.76 mi (1.22 km)
- Coordinates: 40°28′18″N 105°54′32″W

Naming
- Etymology: Gustav Mahler

Geography
- Location within Colorado Location within the United States
- Country: United States
- State: Colorado
- County: Jackson
- Protected area: Never Summer Wilderness
- Parent range: Rocky Mountains; Never Summer Mountains
- Topo map: USGS Mount Richthofen

Geology
- Rock age: Miocene
- Rock type: Granodiorite

Climbing
- Easiest route: Scrambling class 3–4

Mount Mahler is a 12,497-foot-elevation (3,809-meter) mountain summit in Jackson County, Colorado, United States.

== Description ==
Mount Mahler is the eighth-highest peak of the Never Summer Mountains which are a subrange of the Rocky Mountains. The mountain is situated on the northern boundary of the Never Summer Wilderness, on land managed by Routt National Forest. Precipitation runoff from the mountain's slopes drains into tributaries of the Michigan River. Topographic relief is significant as the summit rises 2,250 feet (690 meters) above Silver Creek in one mile (1.6 km) and 1,830 feet (560 meters) above Lake Agnes in 0.6 mile (0.97 km).

== Etymology ==
The mountain's toponym was officially adopted on October 18, 2006, by the United States Board on Geographic Names to honor Gustav Mahler (1860–1911), Austro-Bohemian Romantic composer and conductor.

== Climate ==
According to the Köppen climate classification system, Mount Mahler is located in an alpine subarctic climate zone with cold, snowy winters, and cool to warm summers. Due to its altitude, it receives precipitation all year, as snow in winter, and as thunderstorms in summer, with a dry period in late spring.

== See also ==
- Mountains of Jackson County, Colorado

== Gallery ==
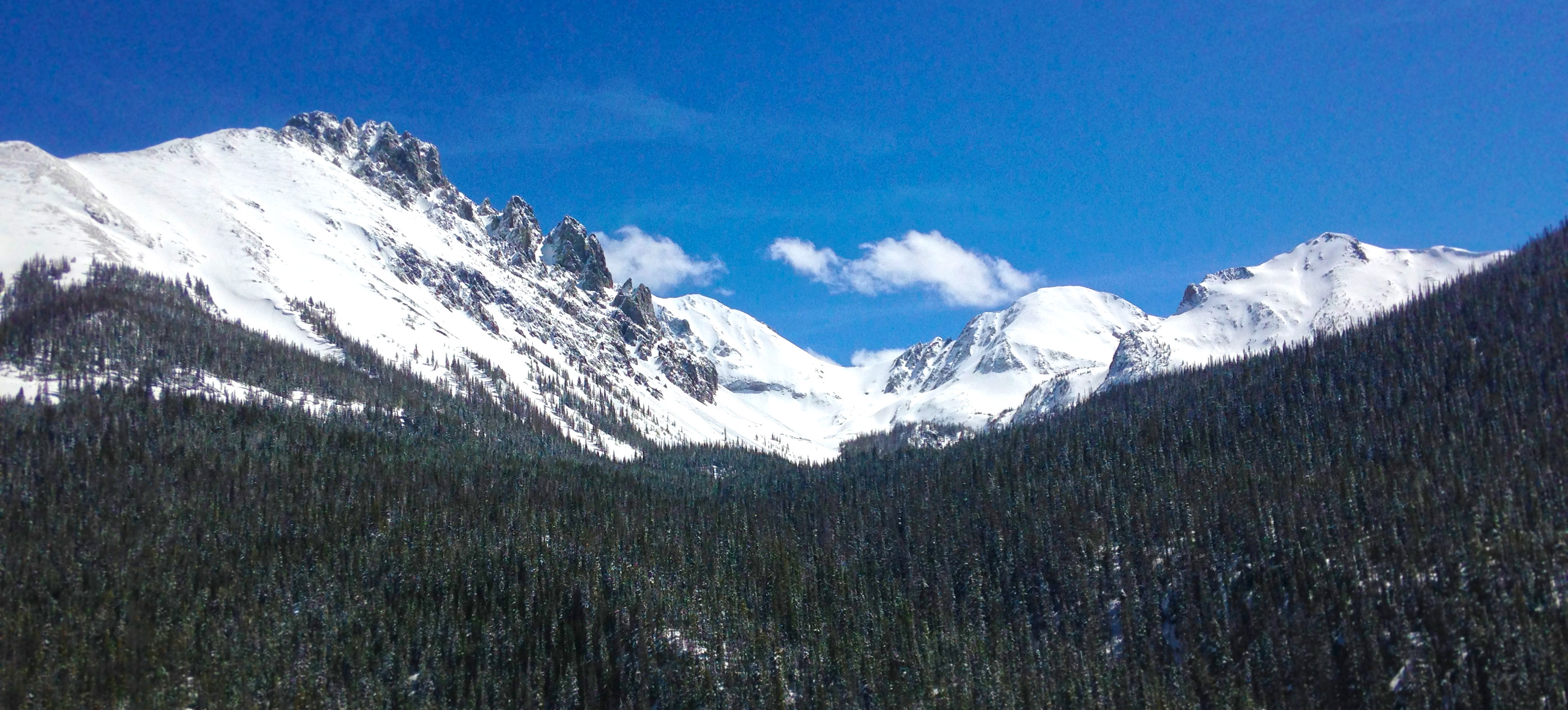
Nokhu Crags (left) and Mt. Mahler (right of center)

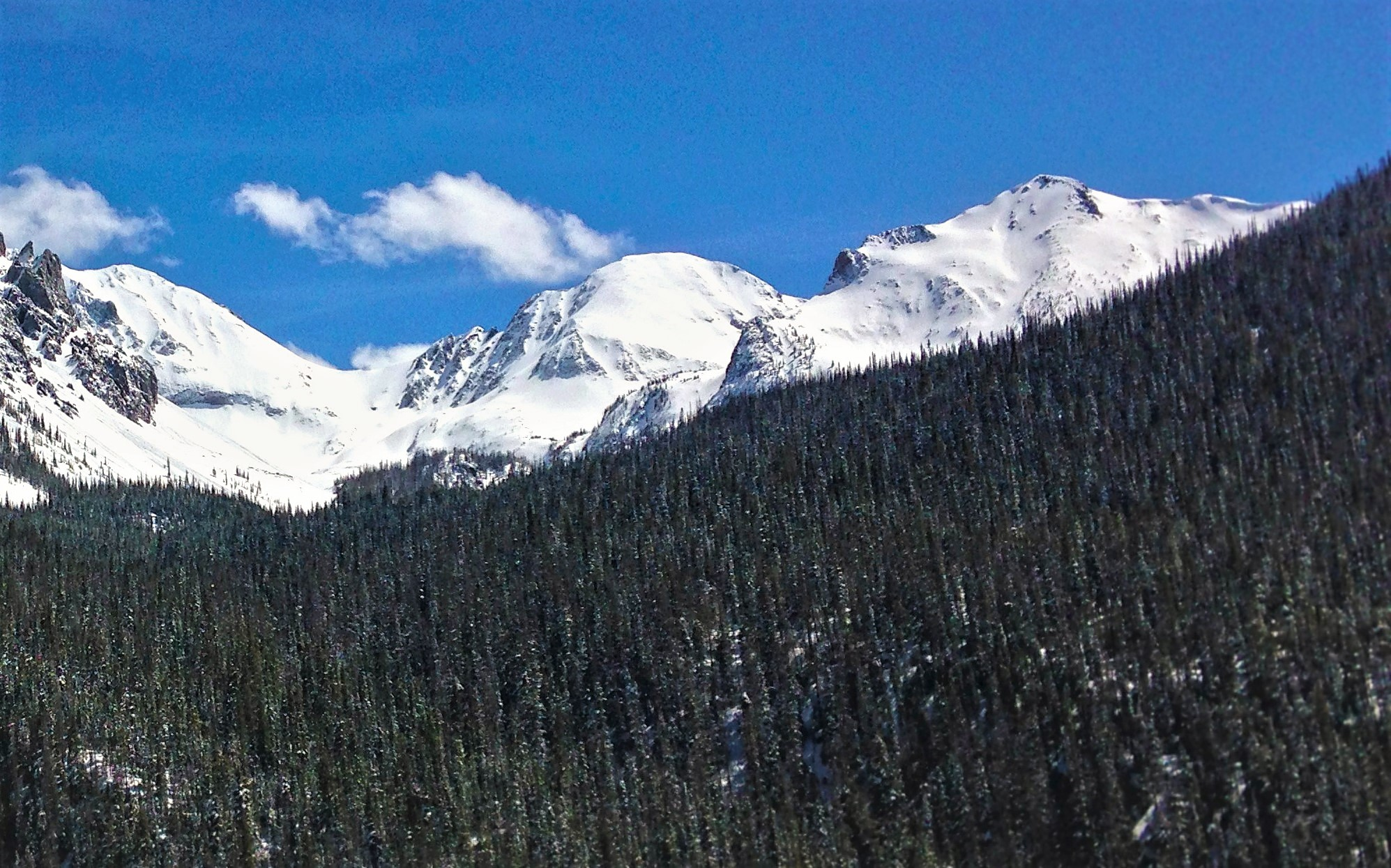
Mt. Mahler (center) and Braddock Peak (right)

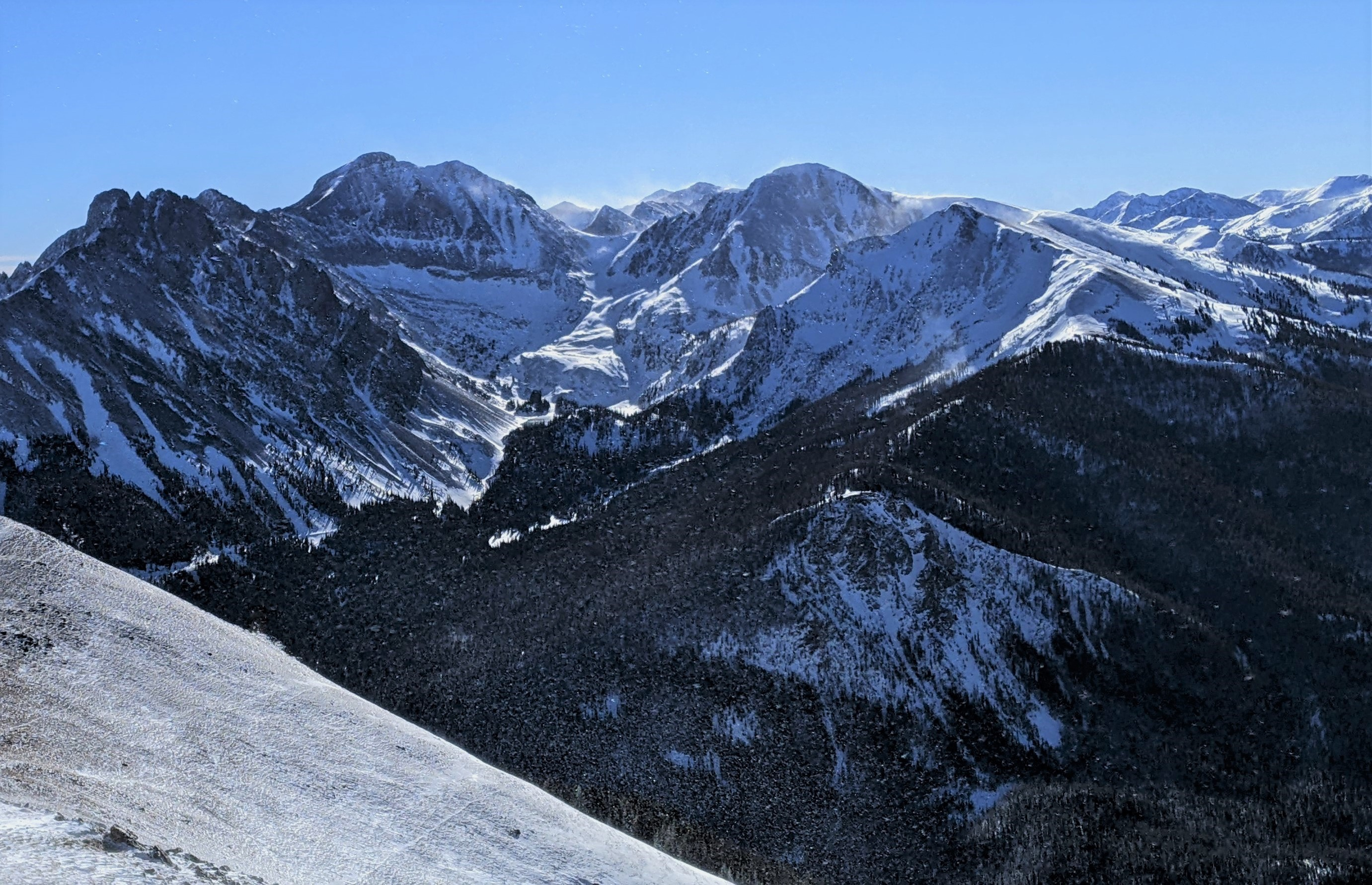
The northern group of the Never Summer Mountains.
Left to rightː Nokhu Crags, Mt. Richthofen, Mt. Mahler, Braddock Peak

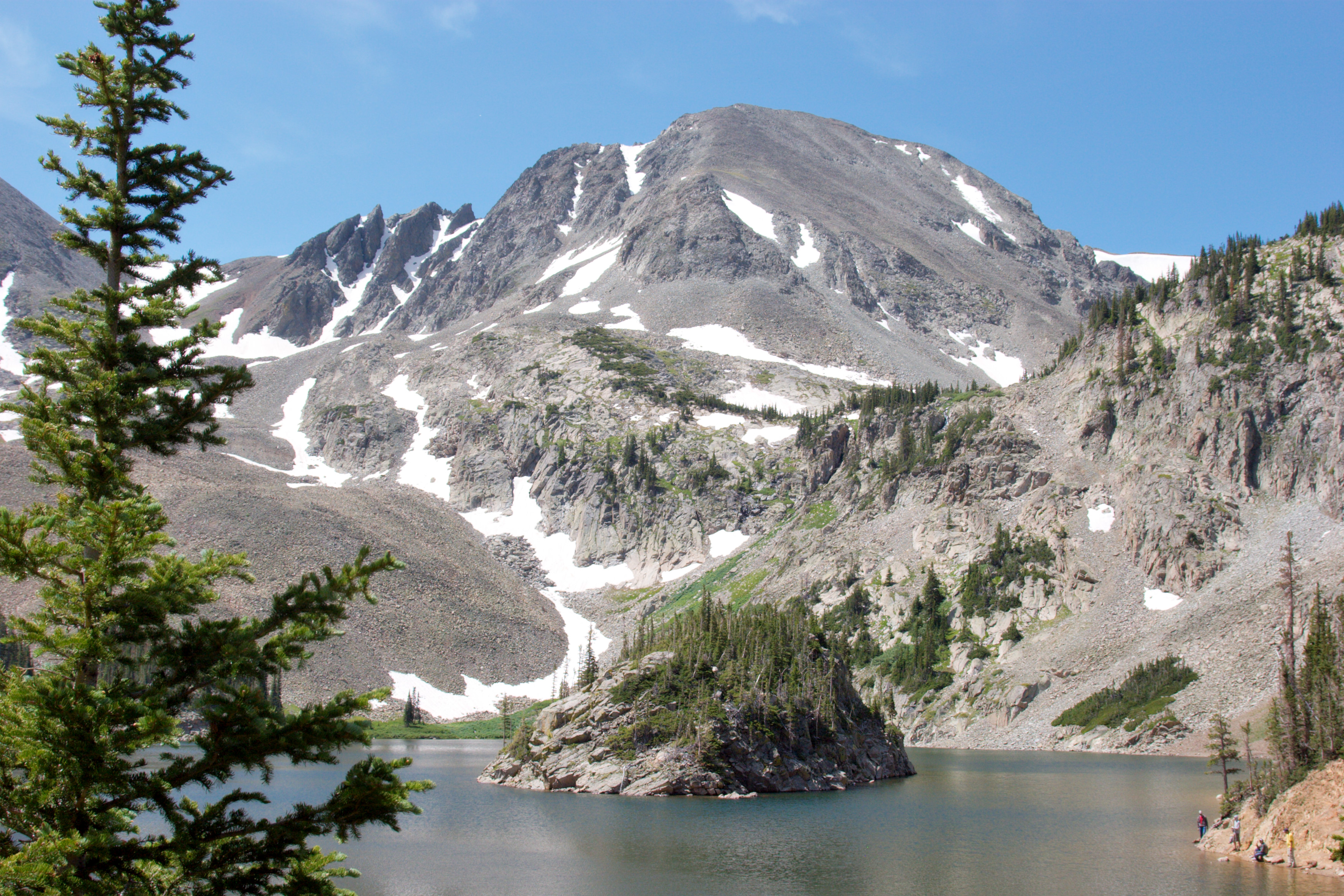
North aspect of Mahler, from Lake Agnes

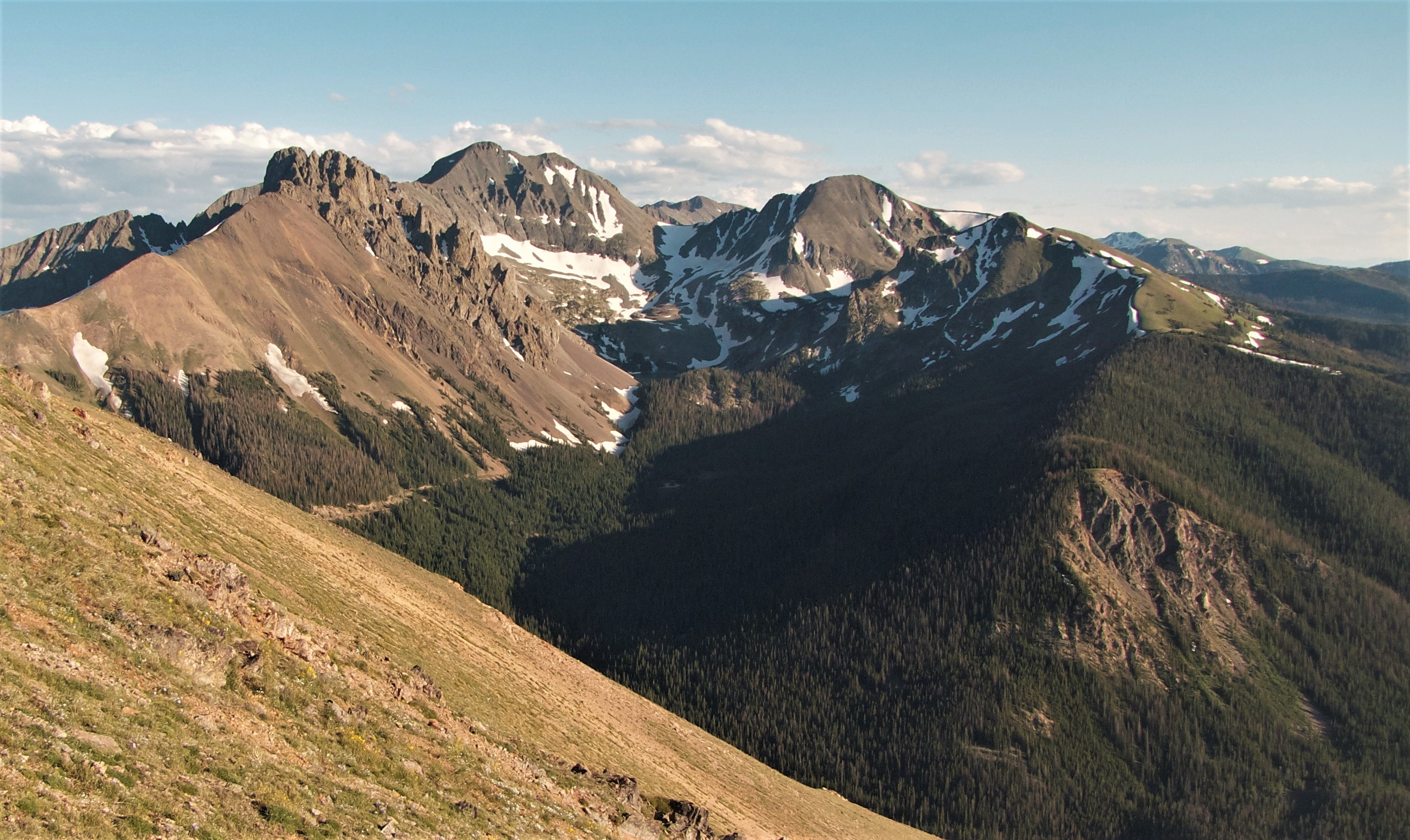
The northern group of the Never Summer Mountains viewed from Diamond Peaks. Left to rightː Nokhu Crags, Mt. Richthofen, Mt. Mahler, Braddock Peak
