= Bowen Lake =

- Location within Alberta
- Location: Alberta province of Canada
- Coordinates: 58°14′34″N 110°10′27″W
- Type: Lake
- Basin countries: Canada

Bowen Lake is a lake in Alberta, Canada.

Bowen Lake has the name of R. E. Bowen, an officer in World War I.

== See also ==
- List of lakes of Alberta
