= William Sidney Cooper =

English painter (1854–1927)

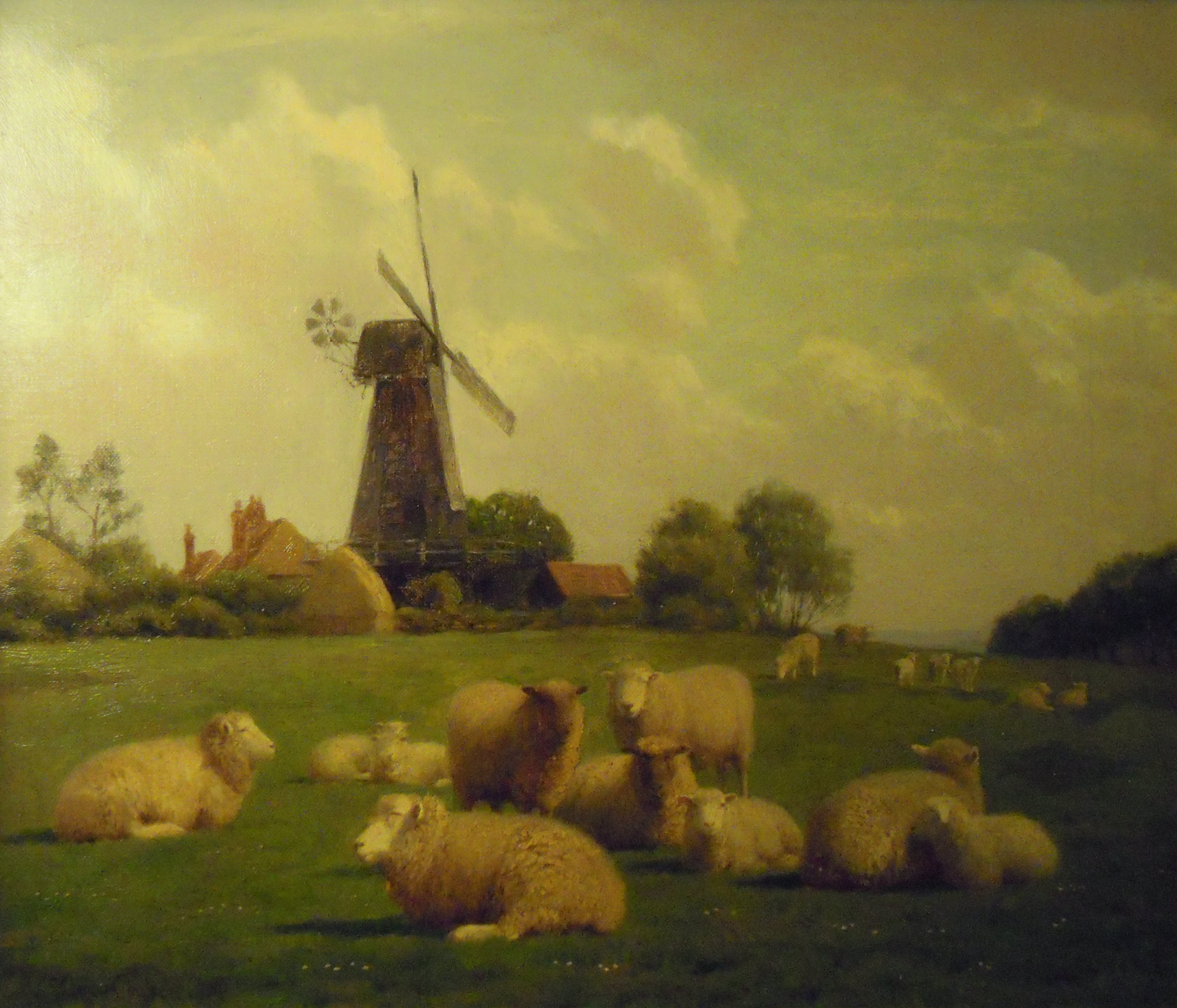
Herne Mill

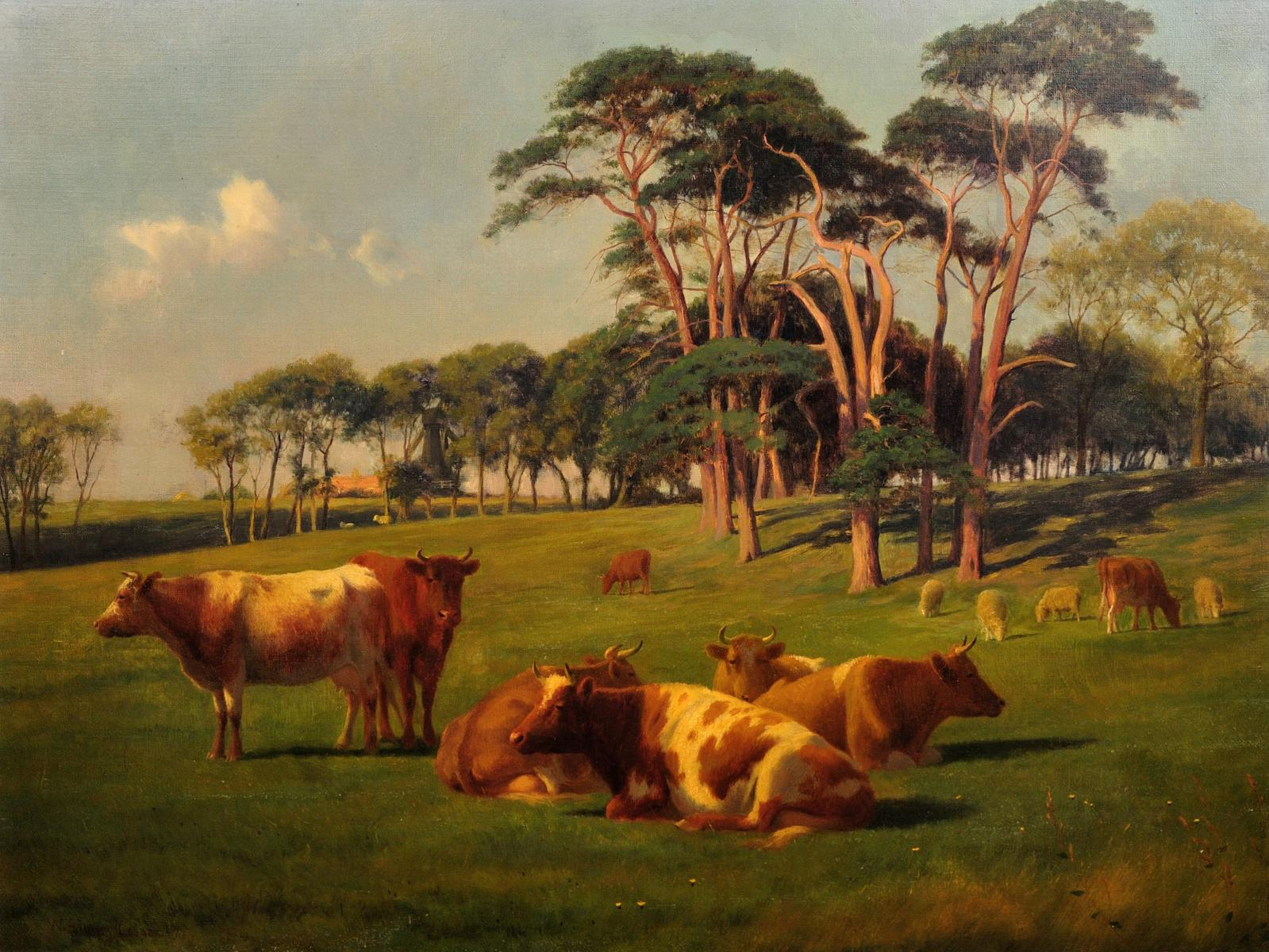
Cattle & Sheep in pasture

William Sidney Cooper (1854–1927) was a British landscape artist, best known for his watercolour paintings of the countryside and farm animals around Herne Bay in Kent.

== Life and work ==
William trained with his great-uncle Thomas Sidney Cooper at his School of Art in Canterbury. William became a successful artist exhibiting at the Royal Academy, the Royal Society of British Artists (Suffolk Street galleries, London) and the Royal Watercolour Society.

Cooper married in 1882, and in 1890 moved to Herne Bay in Kent where he remained for the rest of his life. As well as painting professionally, he was a keen golfer and liked to play Tennis and Bowls. He was also a musician and took part in local musical events. He built many houses in and around Canterbury, the best known being, Alcroft Grange.

== His work ==
Much of Cooper's work reflects the countryside around Herne Bay and often contain cattle (which were his speciality) and sheep as in his Great Uncle's work.

== Death ==
He died in 1927 and is buried in the churchyard at Eddington, Kent.
