= Bowen, Rio Grande County, Colorado =

Ghost town in Rio Grande County, Colorado, United States

Bowen, Colorado
- ghost town
- Location of Bowen, Colorado. Bowen (Colorado)
- Coordinates: 37.4298°N 106.1127°W
- Country: United States
- State: Colorado
- County: Rio Grande
- Elevation: 7,689 ft (2,344 m)
- Time zone: UTC−07:00 (MST)
  - Summer (DST): UTC−06:00 (MDT)

Bowen is a ghost town located in Rio Grande County, in the U.S. state of Colorado.

== History ==
The Bowen, Colorado, post office operated from May 1, 1883, until September 30, 1901. Bowen is mentioned, along with Bowen School, in a 1910 USGS report. Bowen Cemetery and Bowen Community United Methodist Church preserve the place name of the community.

== Geography ==
Bowen is located at coordinates 37.4298°N 106.1127°W at an elevation of 7,689 feet (2,344 m).

== See also ==
- List of ghost towns in Colorado
- List of post offices in Colorado
