= Bowen Mountain (Colorado) =

Mountain in Colorado, United States

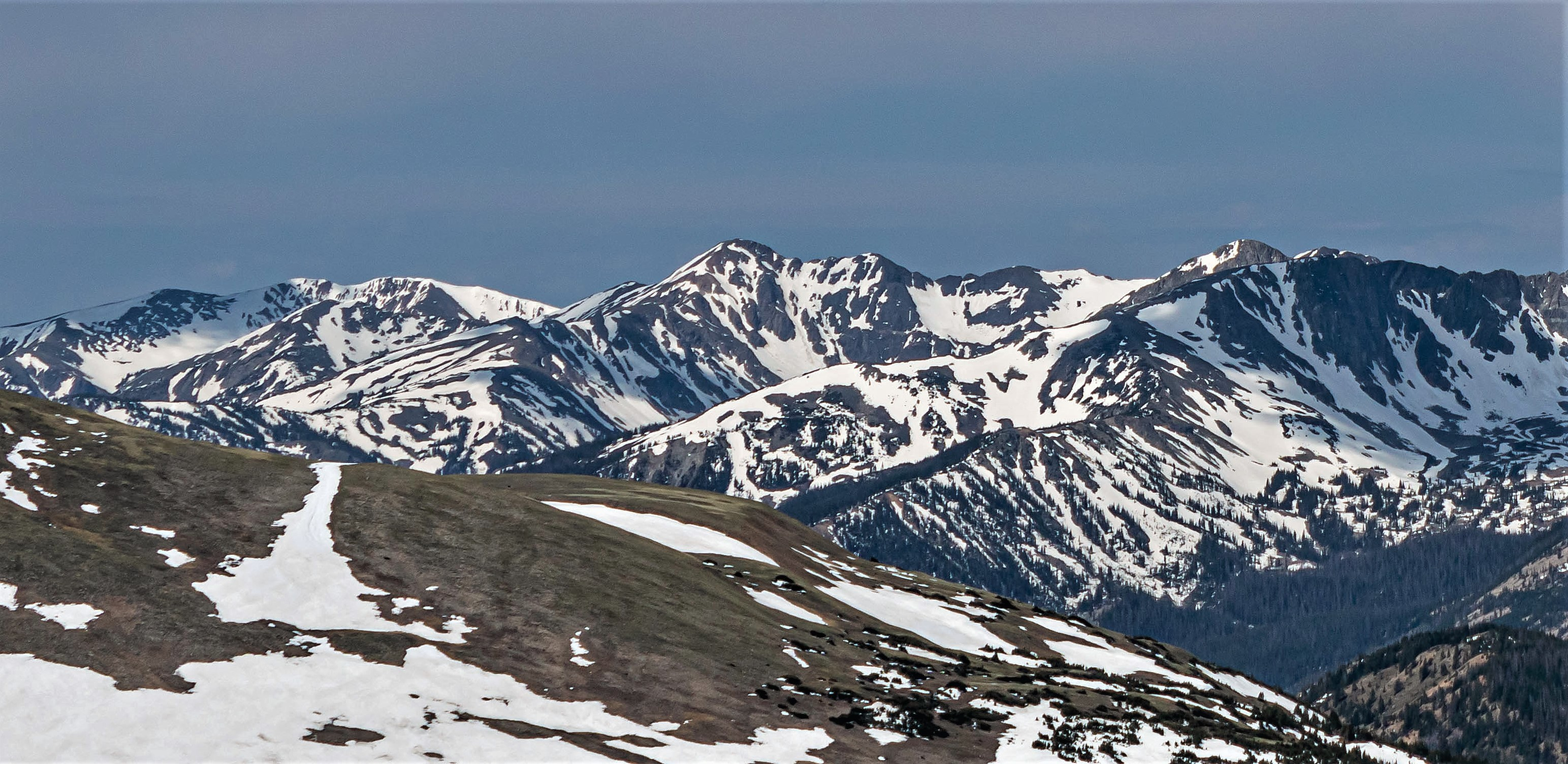
- Northeast aspect, centered

Highest point
- Elevation: 12,524 ft (3,817 m)
- Prominence: 1,271 ft (387 m)
- Parent peak: Mount Nimbus (12,721 ft)
- Isolation: 2.96 mi (4.76 km)
- Coordinates: 40°21′38″N 105°56′00″W

Geography
- Location within Colorado Location within the United States
- Country: United States
- State: Colorado
- County: Grand County
- Protected area: Never Summer Wilderness
- Parent range: Rocky Mountains; Never Summer Mountains
- Topo map: USGS Bowen Mountain

Climbing
- Easiest route: class 2 hiking

Bowen Mountain is a 12,524-foot-elevation (3,817-meter) mountain summit in Grand County, Colorado, United States.

== Description ==
Bowen Mountain is the seventh-highest peak of the Never Summer Mountains which are a subrange of the Rocky Mountains. The mountain is set in the Never Summer Wilderness on land managed by Arapaho National Forest. It is situated along the Continental Divide with the summit offset by approximately one-half mile. Precipitation runoff from the mountain's slopes drains chiefly into the Colorado River. Topographic relief is significant as the summit rises 3,700 feet (1,100 meters) above the Kawuneeche Valley in four miles (6.4 km) and 2,100 feet (640 meters) above Bowen Gulch in one mile (1.6 km).

== Etymology ==
The mountain was named for James H. Bourn, a prospector in this area whose name was misunderstood by a county clerk. Bourn and Alexander Campbell staked a claim on the southern end of Bowen Mountain on July 10, 1875, and called it Wolverine Mine. The mountain's toponym has been officially adopted by the United States Board on Geographic Names.

== Climate ==
According to the Köppen climate classification system, Bowen Mountain is located in an alpine subarctic climate zone with cold, snowy winters, and cool to warm summers. Due to its altitude, it receives precipitation all year, as snow in winter, and as thunderstorms in summer, with a dry period in late spring.

== Gallery ==
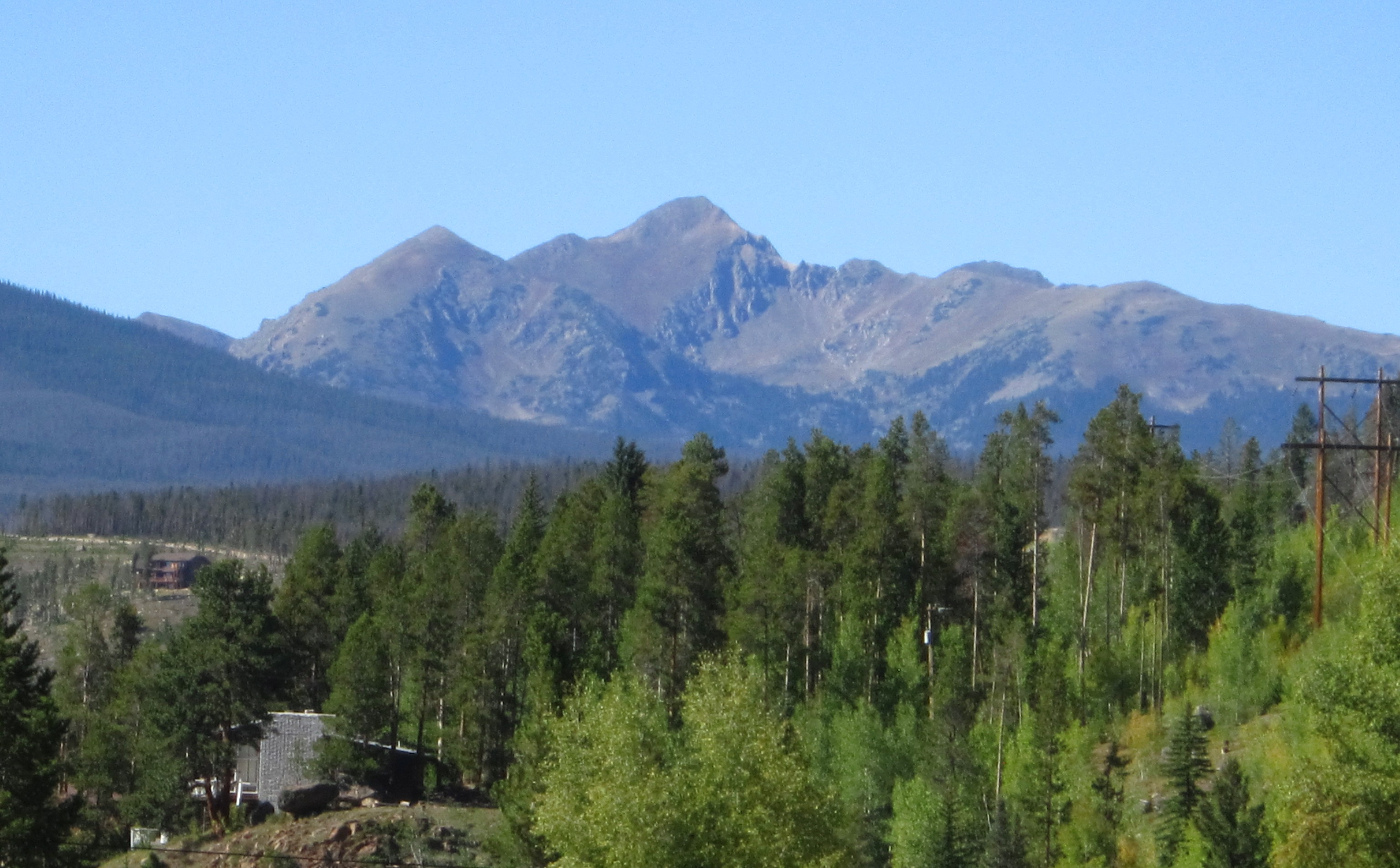
Southeast aspect of Bowen Mountain viewed from Kawuneeche Valley

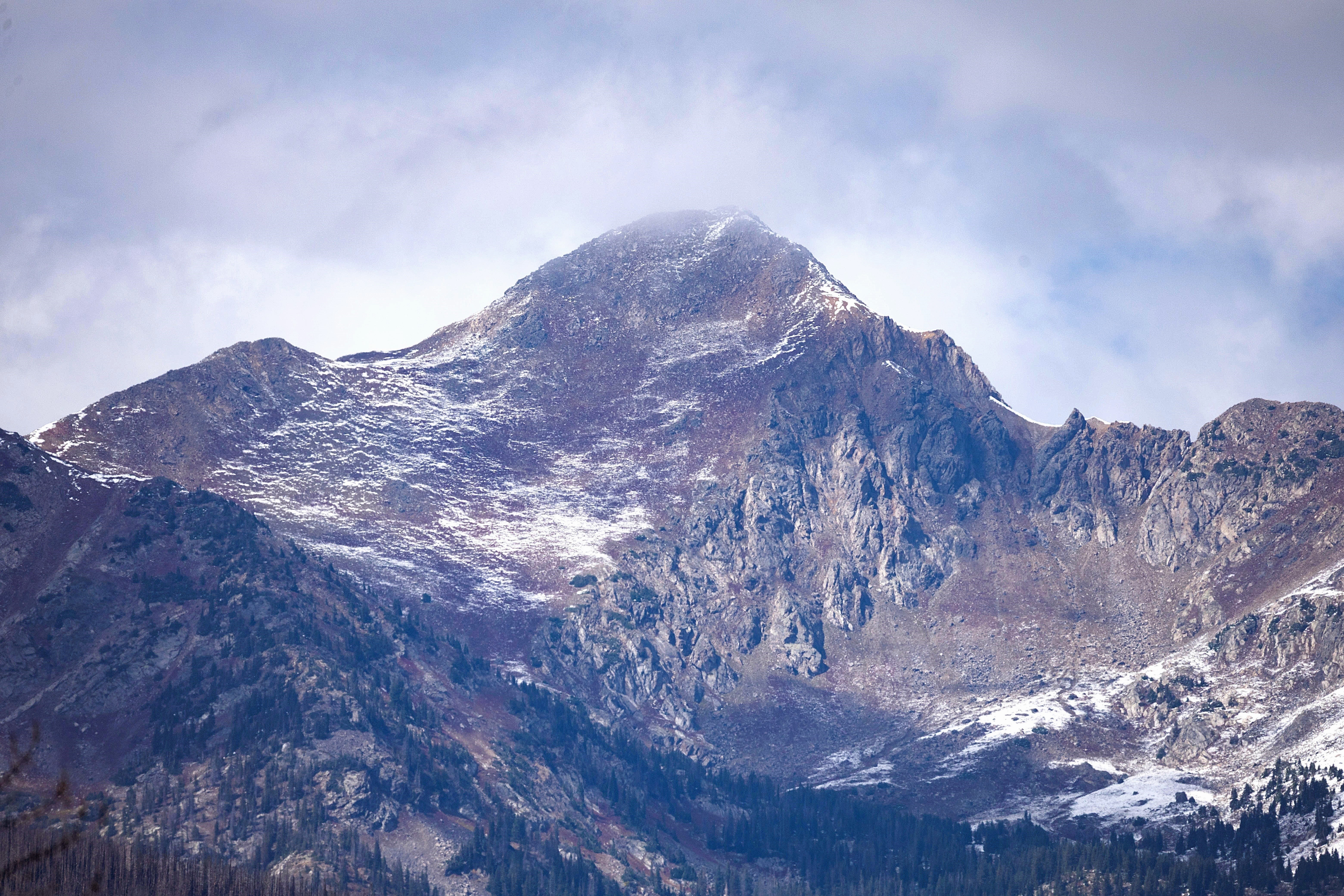
Southeast aspect

== See also ==
- Mountains of Grand County, Colorado
