= Byers Canyon =

Gorge on the upper Colorado River in Grand County, Colorado

Coordinates: 40°04′10″N 106°07′59″W

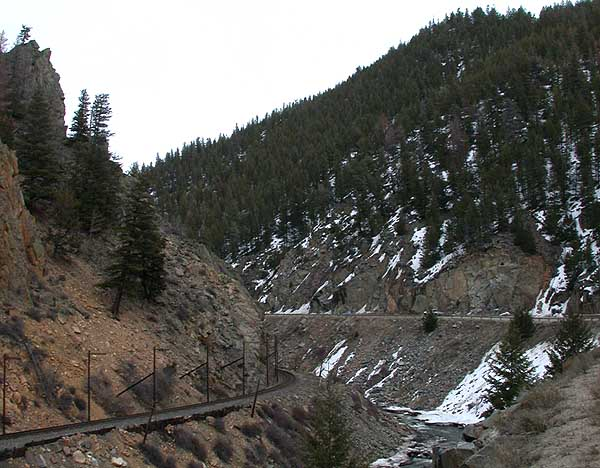
- Byers Canyon, looking upstream. The poles adjacent to the tracks on the left carry alarm wires that stop train traffic in the event of a rockslide

- Location within Colorado
- Length: 8 m (26 ft)

Geography
- Location: Grand County, Colorado, United States
- Country: United States
- State: Colorado
- Region: Grand County, Colorado
- River: Colorado River
- Interactive map of Byers Canyon

Byers Canyon is a short gorge on the upper Colorado River in Grand County, Colorado in the United States. The canyon is approximately 8 miles (13 km) long and is located in the headwaters region of the Colorado between Hot Sulphur Springs and Kremmling. U.S. Highway 40 passes through the canyon between Hot Sulphur Springs and Kremmling. The Union Pacific Railroad's Moffat Route also travels through the short canyon. The Byers Canyon Shooting Range is part of the Colorado Parks and Wildlife Hot Sulphur Springs State Wildlife Area within the canyon providing a winter foraging area for big game animals.

== See also ==
- Gore Canyon
