= Byers Peak Wilderness =

Protected area in Colorado, US

- IUCN category Ib (wilderness area)
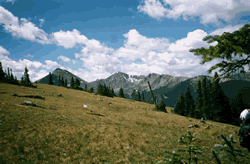

- Location within Colorado Location within the United States
- Location: Grand County, Colorado, USA
- Nearest city: Fraser, CO
- Coordinates: 39°51′50″N 105°56′50″W
- Area: 8,913 acres (36.07 km^{2})
- Established: 1993
- Governing body: U.S. Forest Service
- Website: www.fs.usda.gov/detail/arp/specialplaces/?cid=fsm91_058231

The Byers Peak Wilderness is a U.S. Wilderness Area that is located in the Arapaho National Forest in north central Colorado. The 8,913-acre (36.07 km^{2}) wilderness was established in 1993 and named after its highest point, Byers Peak.

Byers Peak was named after William N. Byers, the first mayor of Hot Sulphur Springs and the founder of Colorado's first newspaper, the Rocky Mountain News. The wilderness contains two glacial lakes, two peaks over 12,500 feet (3,800 m), and 23 miles (37 km) of trails.
