= Radium, Colorado =

Unincorporated community in Grand County, CO, USA

Coordinates: 39°57′10″N 106°33′31″W

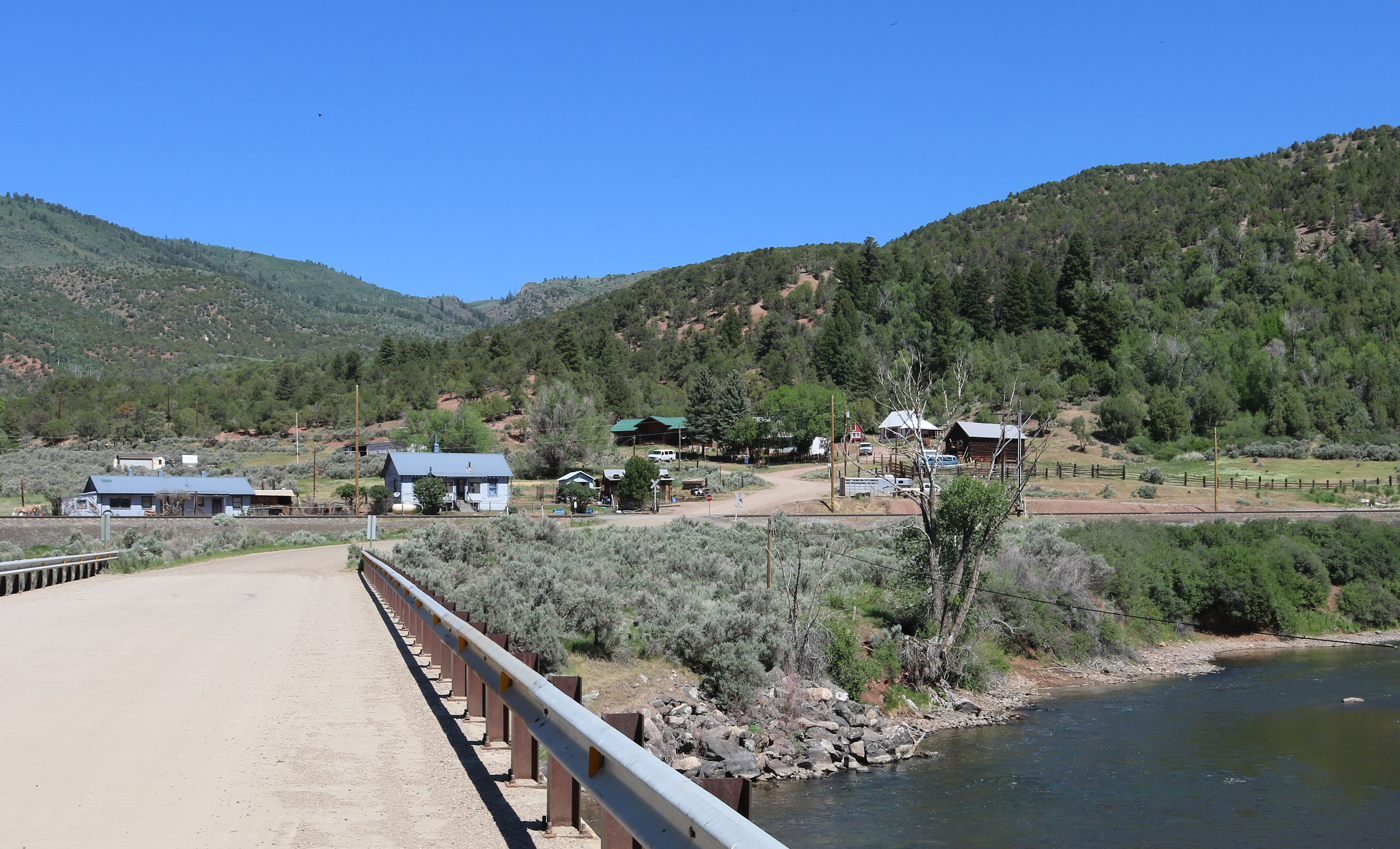
Radium in June 2021

Radium, elevation 6,890 feet (2,100 m), is a small rural unincorporated community in southwestern Grand County, Colorado, United States. The community sits in the mountains along an isolated stretch of Colorado River downstream from Gore Canyon and southwest of Kremmling. The mainline of the Denver and Rio Grande Western Railroad (now the Union Pacific Railroad) runs past the community, which is accessible by dirt and gravel roads only. The community of Radium consists of a cluster of houses on the north side of a bridge on the Colorado. The primary local industry is livestock ranching. The community is named for the element radium, which was formerly mined in Colorado in the early 20th century.

The Radium Recreation Site, part of the Upper Colorado River Special Recreation Management Area managed by the Bureau of Land Management, is on the south bank of the Colorado River across from the community. Radium Hot Springs is located on the river bank, a few miles south of Radium, and about 15 miles from Kremmling.
