= Radium Hot Springs (Colorado) =

Thermal spring

- Radium Warm Springs
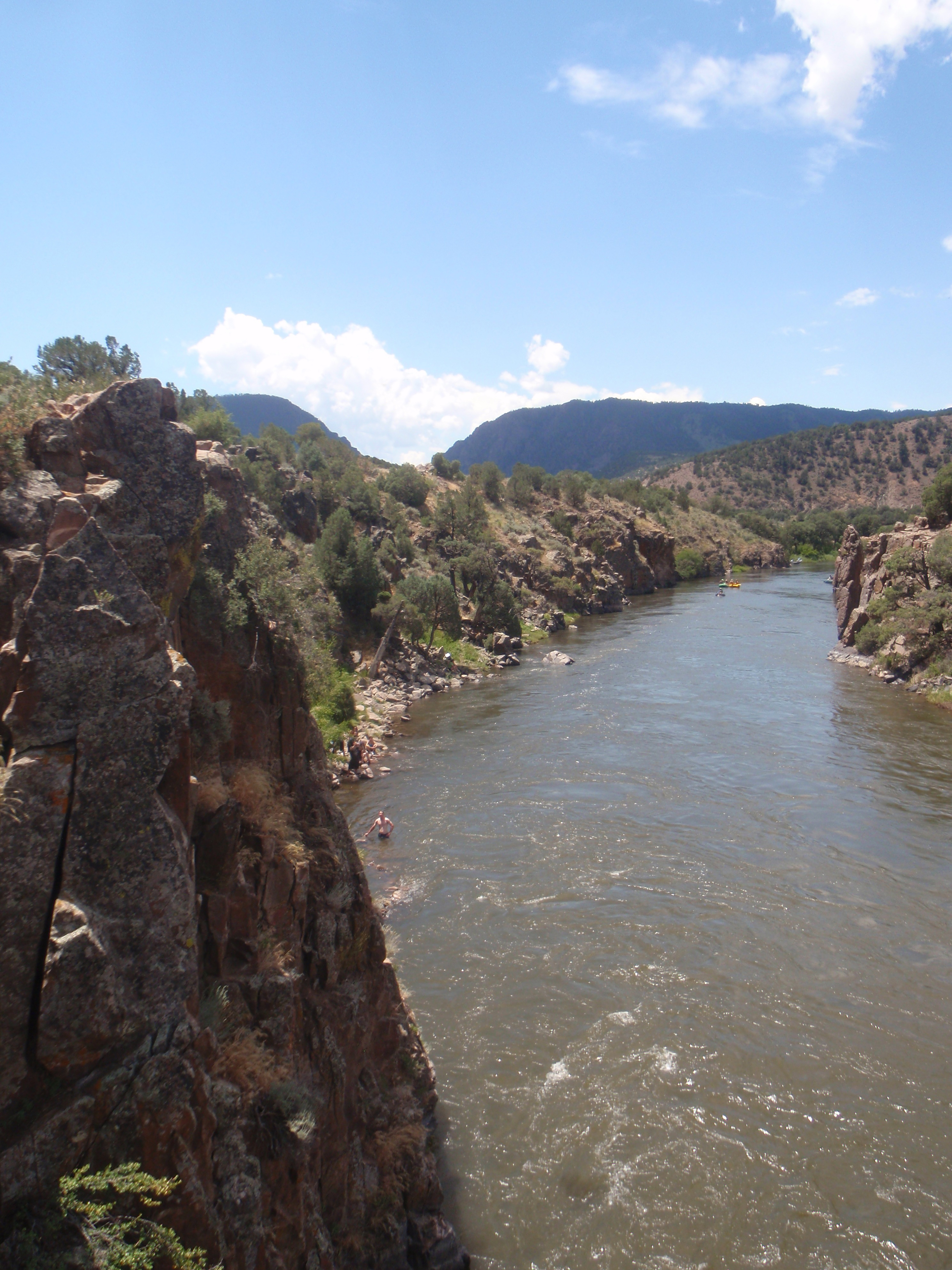
- Colorado River near Radium Hot Springs
- Interactive map of Radium Hot Springs
- Location: near the town of Radium, Colorado
- Coordinates: 39°57′59″N 106°32′44″W
- Elevation: 6,800 ft (2,100 m)
- Type: geothermal
- Temperature: 97 °F (36 °C) to the low 100 degrees F

Radium Hot Springs is a thermal mineral spring near the small town of Radium, Colorado, located halfway between Kremmling and State Bridge, in Grand County, Colorado.

== Description ==
The springs emerge from several sources near the edge of the Colorado River. A large primitive soaking pool with a sandy bottom has been constructed against a sheer rock cliff. The rock-lined soaking pool is reached by way of climbing down a fifty foot long rock chimney via footholds and handholds in the rock. The pool is 2 feet deep and approximately 10 by 18 feet. It fits approximately 10 to 20 people. It is dangerous to attempt to jump from the soaking pool on the rock cliff to the river below, and serious injuries could be incurred.

== Location ==
The hot springs are located in the Radium Wildlife Area of the Bureau of Land Management Radium Recreation Area. Located one quarter mile off the River Rim Trail, the springs are situated on a rock outcropping midway up the sheer rock canyon wall. They are inaccessible by vehicle and are accessible only on foot or by raft. The soaking pool overlooks the Colorado River. The closest area to camp is the Mugrage Campground.

The Denver and Rio Grande Western Railroad can be seen from across the river. This area of the high desert is filled with deep river canyons and sagebrush vegetation.

== Water Profile ==
The water emerges from several sources at the bottom of the gravel lined soaking pool at a temperature range of 97 °F (36 °C) to the low 100s, and cools to the mid-80s in the soaking pool.
