= Whiteley Peak =

Mountain in Colorado, United States

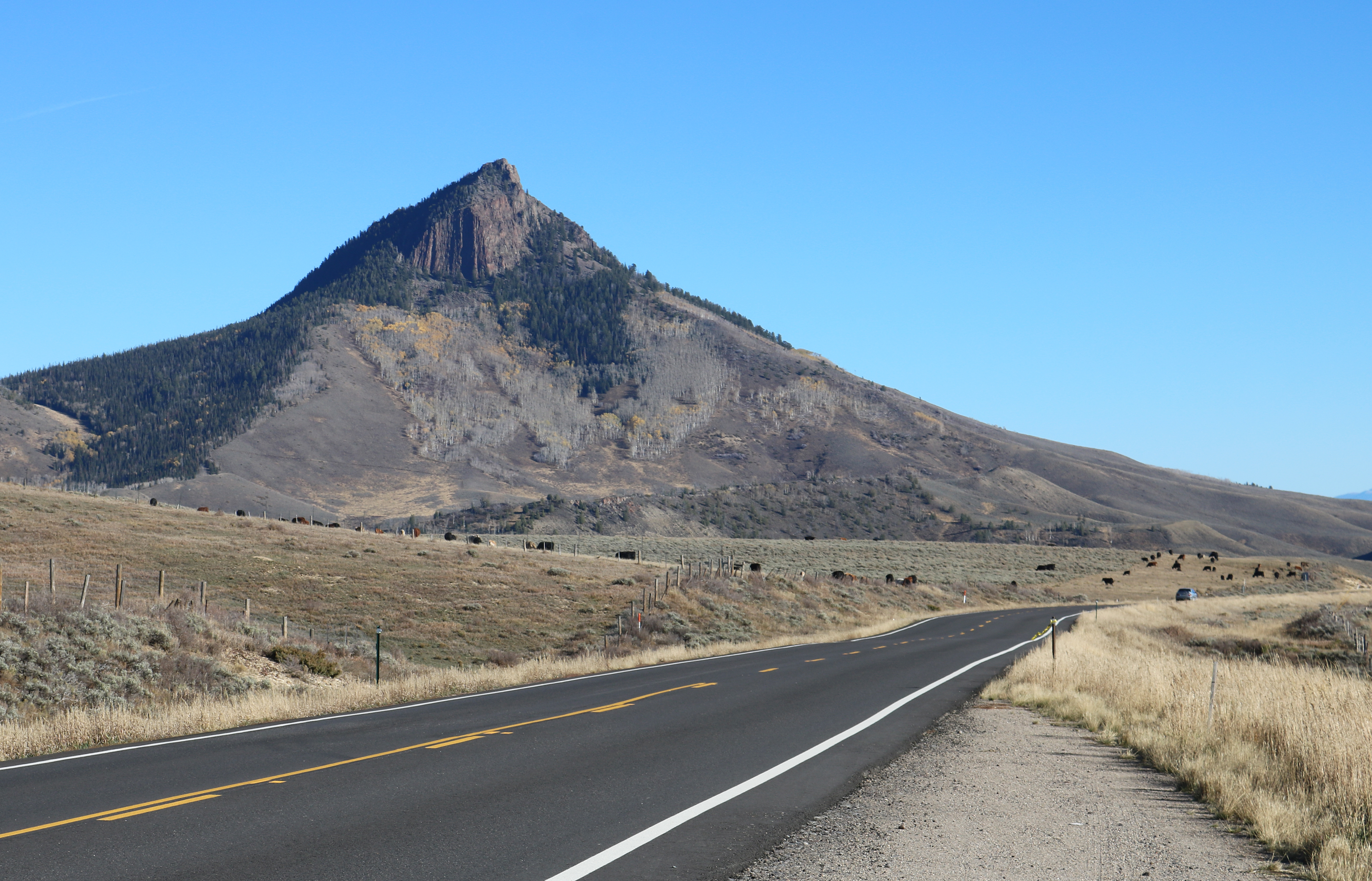
- The mountain in October, 2022

Highest point
- Elevation: 10,092 ft (3,076 m)
- Prominence: 1,195 ft (364 m)
- Isolation: 4.32 mi (6.95 km)
- Coordinates: 40°19′4.33″N 106°29′34.78″W

Geography
- Location within Colorado
- Location: Grand County, Colorado
- Parent range: Rabbit Ears Range
- Topo map: USGS Whiteley Peak

Whiteley Peak, elevation 10,092 ft (3,076 m), is a mountain in Grand County, Colorado north of Kremmling and close to U.S. Highway 40. The mountain is in the Rabbit Ears Range, a range composed chiefly of volcanic rock, and Whiteley Peak has some columnar jointing near the top.

Whiteley Peak has been called "one of the most prominent landmarks in northwestern Middle Park." Its crest lies about 2,200 feet (670 m) above the nearby Muddy Creek, and the southwest face of the peak is marked by precipitous cliffs.

== Climbing ==
A narrow strip of privately owned land encircles the peak, preventing public access for climbing.
