= Byers Peak =

Mountain in Colorado, United States

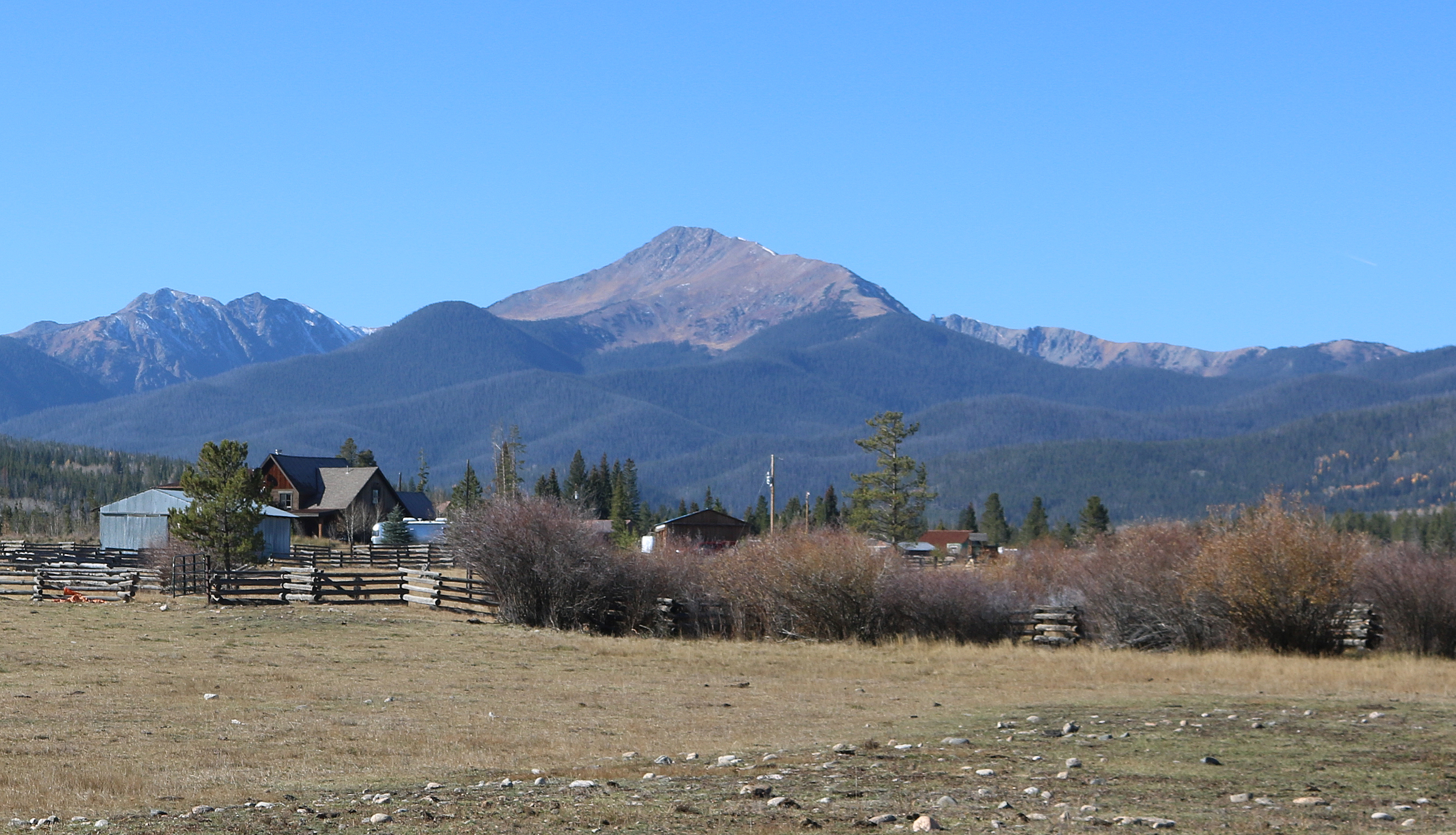
- The mountain in October, 2022

Highest point
- Elevation: 12,815 ft (3,906 m)
- Prominence: 1,272 ft (388 m)
- Isolation: 6.77 mi (10.90 km)
- Coordinates: 39°51′52.46″N 105°56′50.94″W

Naming
- Etymology: Named for William Byers

Geography
- Location within Colorado
- Location: Grand County, Colorado
- Parent range: Vasquez Mountains
- Topo map: USGS Byers Peak

Climbing
- Easiest route: New Byers Peak Trail

Byers Peak, elevation 12,815 ft (3,906 m), is a mountain in Grand County, Colorado southwest of Fraser, Colorado. The mountain is part of the Byers Peak Wilderness and is the peak for which the wilderness area is named. Byers Peak is easily seen from Fraser and serves as an easily-identifiable landmark.

The mountain is named for William Byers, the founder of the Rocky Mountain News.
