= Saint Louis Creek =

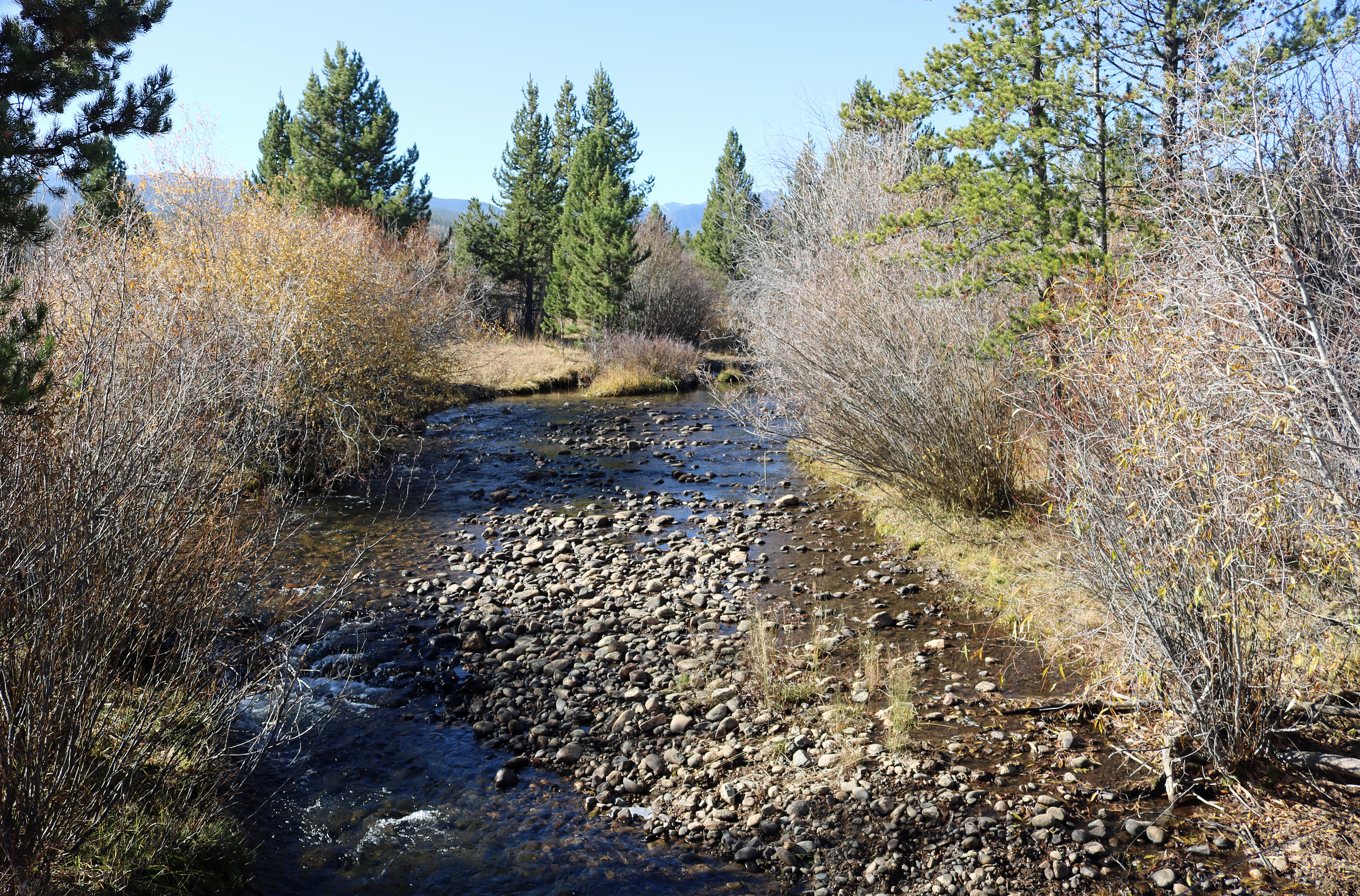
- The creek viewed from Grand County Road 72

Physical characteristics
- Source
  - location: Near Saint Louis Peak in Grand County, Colorado
  - coordinates: 39°48′26.95″N 105°57′21.05″W
- Mouth
  - location: Fraser, Colorado
  - coordinates: 39°57′4.95″N 105°48′53.03″W
  - elevation: 8,531 feet (2,600 meters)

Basin features
- Progression: Fraser River—Colorado River
- Tributaries
  - left: Mine Creek, Gordon Creek, Lunch Creek, Iron Creek, Byers Creek, West Saint Louis Creek.
  - right: Range Creek, East Saint Louis Creek, Fool Creek, King Creek.

Saint Louis Creek is a tributary of the Fraser River in Grand County, Colorado.

== Course ==
The creek rises near Saint Louis Peak in the Arapaho National Forest. From there, it flows generally north northeastward, passing through the Fraser Experimental Forest and then Fraser itself until it reaches its confluence with the Fraser River on the east side of Highway 40 just south of Grand County Road 8 in Fraser.

== History ==
Former United States President Dwight D. Eisenhower used to vacation with friends at the Byers Peak Ranch southwest of Fraser. Saint Louis Creek flows through the ranch, and Eisenhower used to fish for brook trout in the creek during his visits. While recuperating from his heart attack in fall 1955, Eisenhower completed a painting of the creek, frozen over in winter.

== See also ==
- List of rivers of Colorado
