= Cozens Ranch House =

Historic house in Colorado, United States

- U.S. National Register of Historic Places
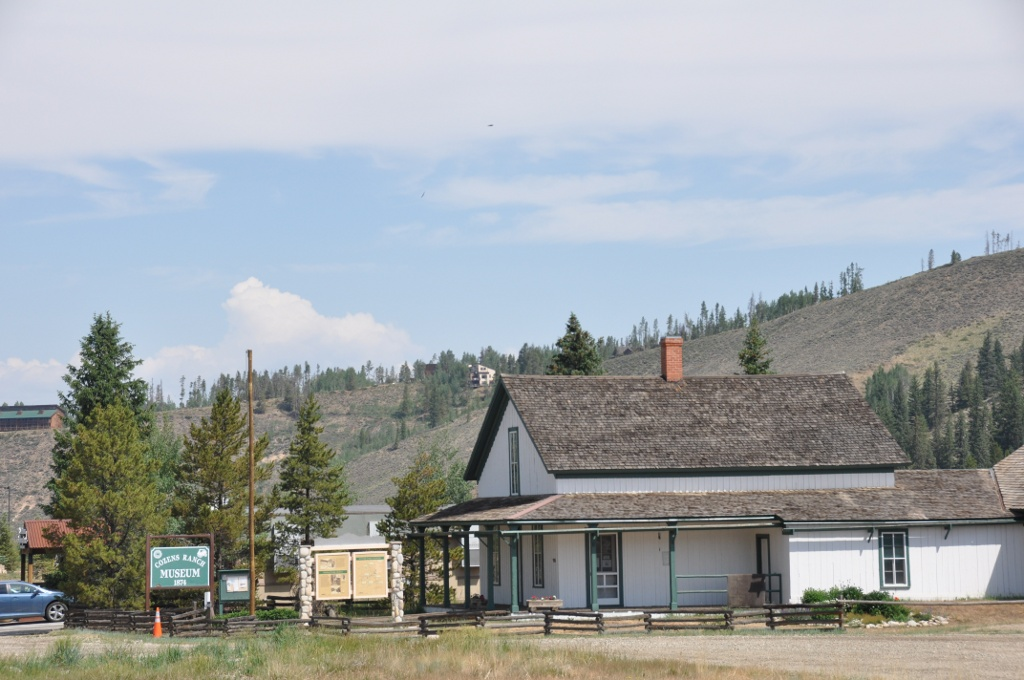

- Location within Colorado Location within the United States
- Location: CO 40 1 1/2 mi. S of Fraser, Fraser, Colorado
- Coordinates: 39°55′56″N 105°47′24″W
- Area: less than one acre
- Built: 1874
- Architect: William Zane Cozens
- Architectural style: Western Vernacular
- NRHP reference No.: 88000709
- Added to NRHP: June 9, 1988

The Cozens Ranch House in Fraser, Colorado was built by William (Billy) Cozens, sheriff of Central City after he married Mary York. Mary insisted that they leave the wild mining town, so the Cozens family relocated to Grand County, where they started a ranch in 1874. The homestead was the first in the Fraser Valley. The original two-story ranch house was constructed in 1874. A stagecoach stop was added in 1876, where travelers coming up Berthoud Pass could stop for a hot meal or a room for the night. At its height the ranch comprised over 600 acres (240 ha).

Mary Cozens willed the property to the Jesuits at Regis College who renamed the property "Maryvale" and use it as a summer retreat from the 1920s to the 1980s.

== Cozens Ranch Museum ==
In the early 1990s, the Jesuits gave the property to the Grand County Historical Association who then restored it to its 1870s conditions. It opened to the public in 1991 and has been continuously operated as a museum. The museum itself has twelve rooms of exhibits focusing on local history topics.

It is currently the only history museum in the Winter Park-Fraser Area.

The Cozens Ranch was placed on the National Register of Historic Places on June 9, 1988.

== See also ==
- National Register of Historic Places listings in Grand County, Colorado
