= Middle Park (Colorado basin) =

High basin in the state of Colorado

Coordinates: 40°06′42″N 105°56′09″W

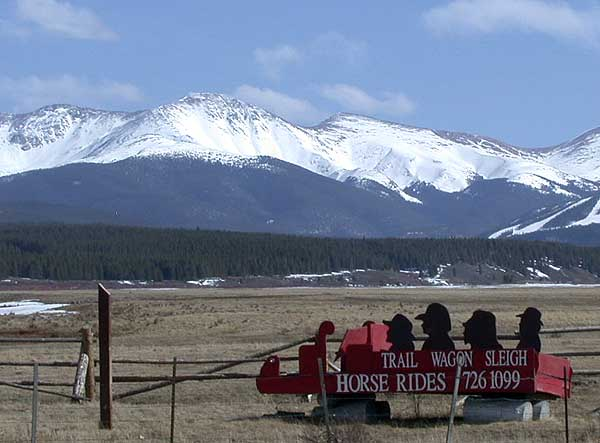
View of Middle Park near Granby, Colorado.

Middle Park (elev. 8,000 ft or 2,400 m) is a high basin in the western United States, in the Rocky Mountains of north-central Colorado. Located in Grand County, it is on the southwest slope of Rocky Mountain National Park, approximately fifty miles (80 km) west of Boulder, on opposite sides of the continental divide.

== Description ==
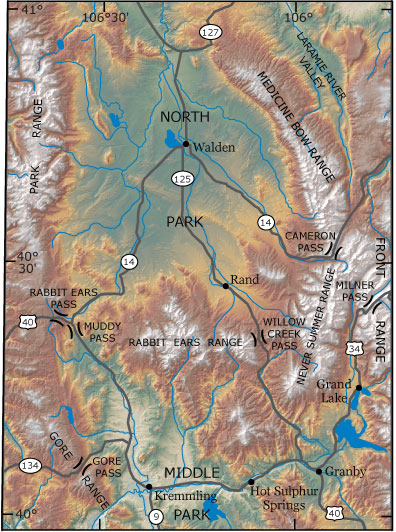
Map showing North and Middle Park.

Middle Park is one of three high mountain basins located in the Colorado Rocky Mountains. Middle Park's valleys are located in mostly Grand County and the Lower Blue River basin of Summit County.

Middle Park features meadows, forests, and river valleys. It spans an alpine basin, beginning south of the origin of the Colorado River, to where the river passes through Gore Canyon.

Towns in the area include Grand Lake, Granby, Hot Sulphur Springs, Parshall, Kremmling, Tabernash, Fraser, and Winter Park.

== History ==
In 1839, the first printed account of Middle Park described it as abundant with animals, including antelope, deer, big horn sheep, bears, buffalo and elk.

Author Robert C. Black III referred to Middle Park as the "Island in the Rockies," due to the valleys being surrounded by mountains, in his book of the same title. The book covers the history of Grand County up to 1930.

== In popular culture ==
The fictional town of Middle Park, CO from the animated series South Park is based on the basin. The town is first mentioned in the Season One episode Big Gay Al's Big Gay Boat Ride, and is additionally mentioned in Quest for Ratings. Trey Parker, one of the creators of the South Park series, grew up in Conifer, about 40 miles (65 km) east of Fairplay.
