= Serra Hoagland =

American forest scientist and wildlife biologist

Serra J. Hoagland is an American forest scientist and wildlife biologist. She is a tribal relations officer and researcher at the United States Forest Service, working at the Rocky Mountain Research Station. She also works as a Forest Service liaison with Salish Kootenai College in Pablo, Montana.

== Early life and education ==
Hoagland grew up in Placerville, California. She is a member of the Laguna Pueblo tribe.

She earned a Bachelor of Science degree in ecology and systematic biology from the California Polytechnic State University, San Luis Obispo in 2008, and a master's degree from the Bren School of Environmental Science and Management at the University of California, Santa Barbara in 2011. During her master's, she mapped out wildlife corridors across 10,000 acres of land in the Goleta Valley. She earned a PhD in forestry from Northern Arizona University in 2016, making her the third Native American woman to receive a doctorate in forestry.

== Current work ==
Hoagland's work focuses on wildlife conservation in the context of Native American communities, and on the impacts on wildlife habitats and forests due to wildfires and temperature increases driven by climate change. She has worked with tribes in New Mexico to understand the effects of forest treatments and wildfires on the habitats of Mexican spotted owls.

Hoagland is an advocate of the use of intergenerational indigenous methods of forest and biodiversity conservation, looking over long time periods and using these methods together with modern science. In 2023, she edited and was a contributor to the book Wildlife Stewardship on Tribal Lands, published by Johns Hopkins University Press. She served as a co-chair for the 2023 Assessment of Indian Forests and Forest Management in the United States, which makes recommendations to Congress regarding funding and improving the state of tribal forestry.

She was named a 2023 Fellow by The Wildlife Society for her work in ecological preservation and for mentoring indigenous students in biology.
