= Fraser, Colorado =

Town in Colorado, United States

- Statutory Town
- Town of Fraser
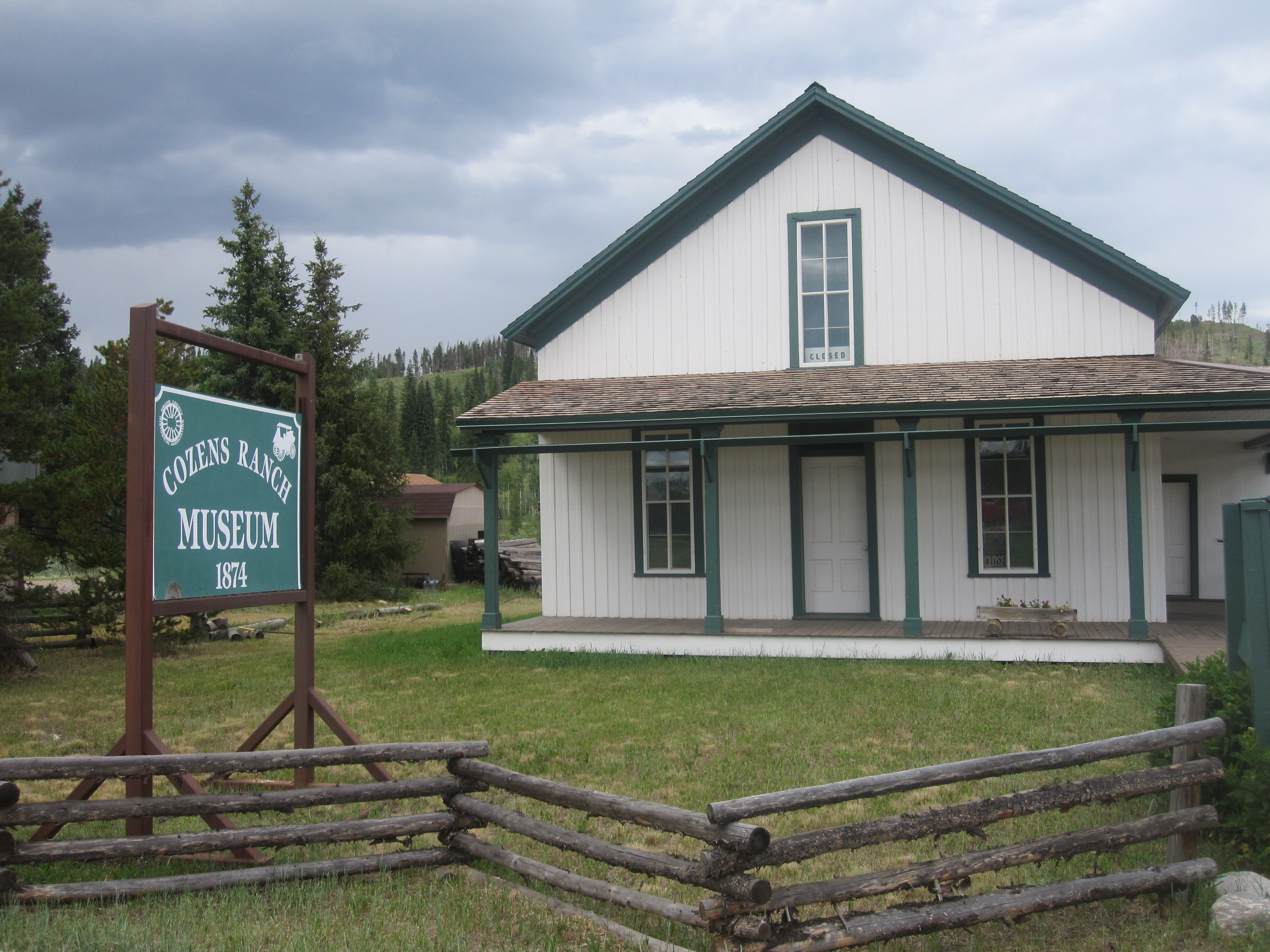
- Cozens Ranch Museum (1874)

- Logo

- Location of the Town of Fraser in Grand County, Colorado
- Coordinates: 39°55′49″N 105°48′11″W
- Country: United States
- State: Colorado
- County: Grand County
- Established: 1871
- Incorporated (town): June 15, 1953

Government
  - Type: Statutory Town
  - Mayor: Brian Cerkvenik

Area
  - Total: 3.462 sq mi (8.966 km^{2})
  - Land: 3.457 sq mi (8.953 km^{2})
  - Water: 0.0050 sq mi (0.013 km^{2})
- Elevation: 8,813 ft (2,686 m)

Population (2020)
  - Total: 1,400
  - Density: 410/sq mi (160/km^{2})
- Time zone: UTC−07:00 (MST)
  - Summer (DST): UTC−06:00 (MDT)
- ZIP code: 80442
- Area code: 970
- FIPS code: 08-28305
- GNIS feature ID: 2412655
- Website: www.frasercolorado.com

The Town of Fraser is a Statutory Town located in Grand County, Colorado, United States. The town population was 1,400 at the 2020 United States census, a +14.38% increase since the 2010 United States census. The town is situated in Middle Park in the valley of the Fraser River along U.S. Highway 40. Its location northwest of Winter Park, the location of a popular ski resort, has provided growth in recent years with new condominium and other real estate developments.

== History ==
Fraser was incorporated in 1953. A post office called Fraser has been in operation since 1876. The town derives its name from Reuben Frazer, a pioneer settler.

== Geography ==
Fraser is located in southeastern Grand County. It is bordered to the south by the town of Winter Park and to the north by unincorporated Tabernash. U.S. Route 40 leads south and east across Berthoud Pass 71 miles (114 km) to Denver, and northwest 15 miles (24 km) to Granby, the largest town in Grand County.

At the 2020 United States census, the town had a total area of 2,216 acres (8.966 km^{2}) including 3.2 acres (0.013 km^{2}) of water. The Fraser River passes through the east side of town, flowing northward toward the Colorado River.

=== Climate ===
Fraser, with an annual mean temperature of 38.0 °F (3.3 °C) (or 34.8 °F (1.6 °C) based on another station in town) is one of the coldest incorporated towns in the lower 48 states. It can and does get frost year-round, totaling 287.3 nights under 32 °F (0 °C). Among currently inhabited localities in the United States this is rivalled only by towns in northern Alaska and a few other high mountain localities in the West like Bodie, California or Stanley, Idaho. The total of 63.4 nights under 0 °F (−17.8 °C) is also among the highest in the contiguous 48 states, but the 59.9 days with highs not topping freezing is exceeded by substantial areas of North Dakota, Minnesota, northern Wisconsin and the Upper Peninsula of Michigan. Both Fraser and International Falls, Minnesota, have claimed the title "Icebox of the Nation", which has caused conflict between the two towns over the years.

According to the Köppen climate classification system, Fraser has a subalpine climate, abbreviated Dfc on climate maps or Eolo in the Trewartha climate classification. The hottest temperature recorded in Fraser is 94 °F (34.4 °C) on July 10, 1939, and the coldest −53 °F (−47.2 °C) on January 10, 1962. The wettest calendar year has been 1957 with 30.33 inches (770.4 mm) and the driest 1944 with 11.04 inches (280.4 mm), whilst the most precipitation in one month has been 7.69 inches (195.3 mm) in September 1961. Snowfall is naturally heavy at 143.2 inches or 3.6 meters and has ranged up to 82.4 inches (2.1 m) in February 1936 and 275.5 inches (7.0 m) from July 1926 to June 1927.

A freeze has been recorded for every single date of the year, one of the only locations in the entire United States to hold that record.

Climate data for Fraser, Colorado, 1991–2020 normals, extremes 1909–1974, 1989–present
Month	Jan	Feb	Mar	Apr	May	Jun	Jul	Aug	Sep	Oct	Nov	Dec	Year
Record high °F (°C)	50 (10)	55 (13)	69 (21)	74 (23)	81 (27)	87 (31)	94 (34)	87 (31)	82 (28)	75 (24)	65 (18)	58 (14)	94 (34)
Mean maximum °F (°C)	42.0 (5.6)	46.1 (7.8)	54.8 (12.7)	64.7 (18.2)	74.1 (23.4)	81.0 (27.2)	83.3 (28.5)	81.2 (27.3)	76.7 (24.8)	69.1 (20.6)	55.3 (12.9)	44.1 (6.7)	83.7 (28.7)
Mean daily maximum °F (°C)	30.8 (−0.7)	34.4 (1.3)	42.7 (5.9)	51.1 (10.6)	62.1 (16.7)	72.4 (22.4)	76.8 (24.9)	74.5 (23.6)	68.0 (20.0)	55.7 (13.2)	41.1 (5.1)	30.7 (−0.7)	53.4 (11.9)
Daily mean °F (°C)	14.9 (−9.5)	18.2 (−7.7)	26.7 (−2.9)	35.4 (1.9)	44.5 (6.9)	52.5 (11.4)	57.4 (14.1)	55.6 (13.1)	48.6 (9.2)	38.3 (3.5)	25.3 (−3.7)	15.0 (−9.4)	36.0 (2.2)
Mean daily minimum °F (°C)	−0.9 (−18.3)	2.0 (−16.7)	10.7 (−11.8)	19.8 (−6.8)	26.9 (−2.8)	32.6 (0.3)	38.0 (3.3)	36.8 (2.7)	29.1 (−1.6)	20.9 (−6.2)	9.5 (−12.5)	−0.8 (−18.2)	18.7 (−7.4)
Mean minimum °F (°C)	−25.9 (−32.2)	−23.5 (−30.8)	−15.0 (−26.1)	1.1 (−17.2)	16.0 (−8.9)	23.8 (−4.6)	29.6 (−1.3)	28.4 (−2.0)	17.5 (−8.1)	3.2 (−16.0)	−15.0 (−26.1)	−24.3 (−31.3)	−30.9 (−34.9)
Record low °F (°C)	−53 (−47)	−49 (−45)	−39 (−39)	−30 (−34)	−1 (−18)	12 (−11)	18 (−8)	15 (−9)	−2 (−19)	−19 (−28)	−37 (−38)	−50 (−46)	−53 (−47)
Average precipitation inches (mm)	1.94 (49)	1.43 (36)	1.79 (45)	2.04 (52)	1.27 (32)	1.18 (30)	1.90 (48)	1.73 (44)	1.63 (41)	1.62 (41)	1.37 (35)	1.68 (43)	19.58 (496)
Average snowfall inches (cm)	24.7 (63)	24.7 (63)	19.4 (49)	18.6 (47)	3.0 (7.6)	0.4 (1.0)	0.0 (0.0)	0.0 (0.0)	1.2 (3.0)	9.5 (24)	16.2 (41)	25.5 (65)	143.2 (363.6)
Average extreme snow depth inches (cm)	22.8 (58)	25.4 (65)	22.0 (56)	12.9 (33)	2.3 (5.8)	0.0 (0.0)	0.0 (0.0)	0.0 (0.0)	0.6 (1.5)	4.7 (12)	9.0 (23)	17.4 (44)	28.3 (72)
Average precipitation days (≥ 0.01 in)	10.7	10.8	8.3	8.8	7.4	5.8	8.9	11.1	7.9	6.9	7.9	10.4	104.9
Average snowy days (≥ 0.1 in)	10.6	10.8	7.4	6.0	0.8	0.1	0.0	0.0	0.5	3.3	7.4	10.5	57.4
Source 1: NOAA
Source 2: National Weather Service

=== Icebox of the Nation ===
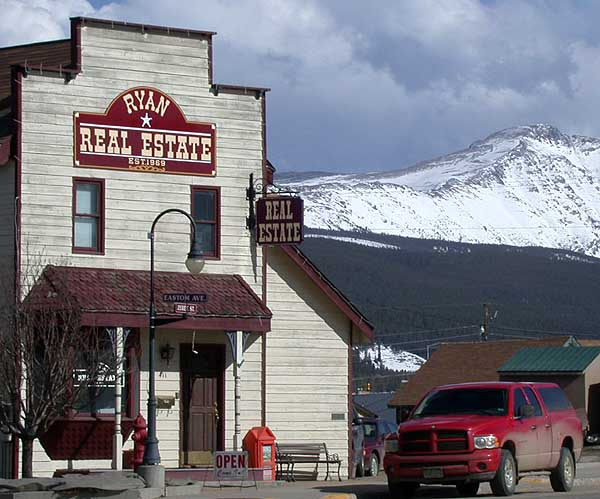
Downtown Fraser, Colorado, April 2005

Fraser, Colorado has been in a dispute with International Falls, Minnesota since 1956 over use of the trademark "Icebox of the Nation." After several years of legal battles, the United States Patent and Trademark Office officially registered the slogan with International Falls on January 29, 2008.

== Demographics ==
Historical population
Census	Pop.	Note	%±
1960	253		—
1970	221		−12.6%
1980	470		112.7%
1990	575		22.3%
2000	910		58.3%
2010	1,224		34.5%
2020	1,400		14.4%
U.S. Decennial Census

=== 2020 census ===
As of the 2020 census, Fraser had a population of 1,400. The median age was 35.9 years. 13.5% of residents were under the age of 18 and 10.8% of residents were 65 years of age or older. For every 100 females there were 124.0 males, and for every 100 females age 18 and over there were 126.8 males age 18 and over.

99.1% of residents lived in urban areas, while 0.9% lived in rural areas.

There were 632 households in Fraser, of which 18.7% had children under the age of 18 living in them. Of all households, 34.8% were married-couple households, 31.2% were households with a male householder and no spouse or partner present, and 23.1% were households with a female householder and no spouse or partner present. About 32.3% of all households were made up of individuals and 4.9% had someone living alone who was 65 years of age or older.

There were 1,426 housing units, of which 55.7% were vacant. The homeowner vacancy rate was 3.7% and the rental vacancy rate was 8.9%.

Racial composition as of the 2020 census
Race	Number	Percent
White	1,216	86.9%
Black or African American	10	0.7%
American Indian and Alaska Native	8	0.6%
Asian	10	0.7%
Native Hawaiian and Other Pacific Islander	1	0.1%
Some other race	65	4.6%
Two or more races	90	6.4%
Hispanic or Latino (of any race)	135	9.6%

=== 2000 census ===
As of the census of 2000, there were 910 people, 410 households, and 191 families residing in the town. The population density was 491.1 inhabitants per square mile (189.6/km^{2}). There were 622 housing units at an average density of 335.7 per square mile (129.6/km^{2}). The racial makeup of the town was 94.51% White, 0.88% African American, 0.88% Native American, 0.88% Asian, 0.22% Pacific Islander, 1.10% from other races, and 1.54% from two or more races. Hispanic or Latino of any race were 3.30% of the population.

There were 410 households, out of which 25.1% had children under the age of 18 living with them, 33.2% were married couples living together, 9.0% had a female householder with no husband present, and 53.2% were non-families. 27.6% of all households were made up of individuals, and 3.2% had someone living alone who was 65 years of age or older. The average household size was 2.21 and the average family size was 2.71.

In the town, the population was spread out, with 17.9% under the age of 18, 14.2% from 18 to 24, 46.2% from 25 to 44, 18.0% from 45 to 64, and 3.7% who were 65 years of age or older. The median age was 31 years. For every 100 females, there were 129.8 males. For every 100 females age 18 and over, there were 130.6 males.

The median income for a household in the town was $38,173, and the median income for a family was $39,643. Males had a median income of $29,583 versus $26,346 for females. The per capita income for the town was $20,628. About 11.1% of families and 8.8% of the population were below the poverty line, including 9.8% of those under age 18 and none of those age 65 or over.

== Infrastructure ==
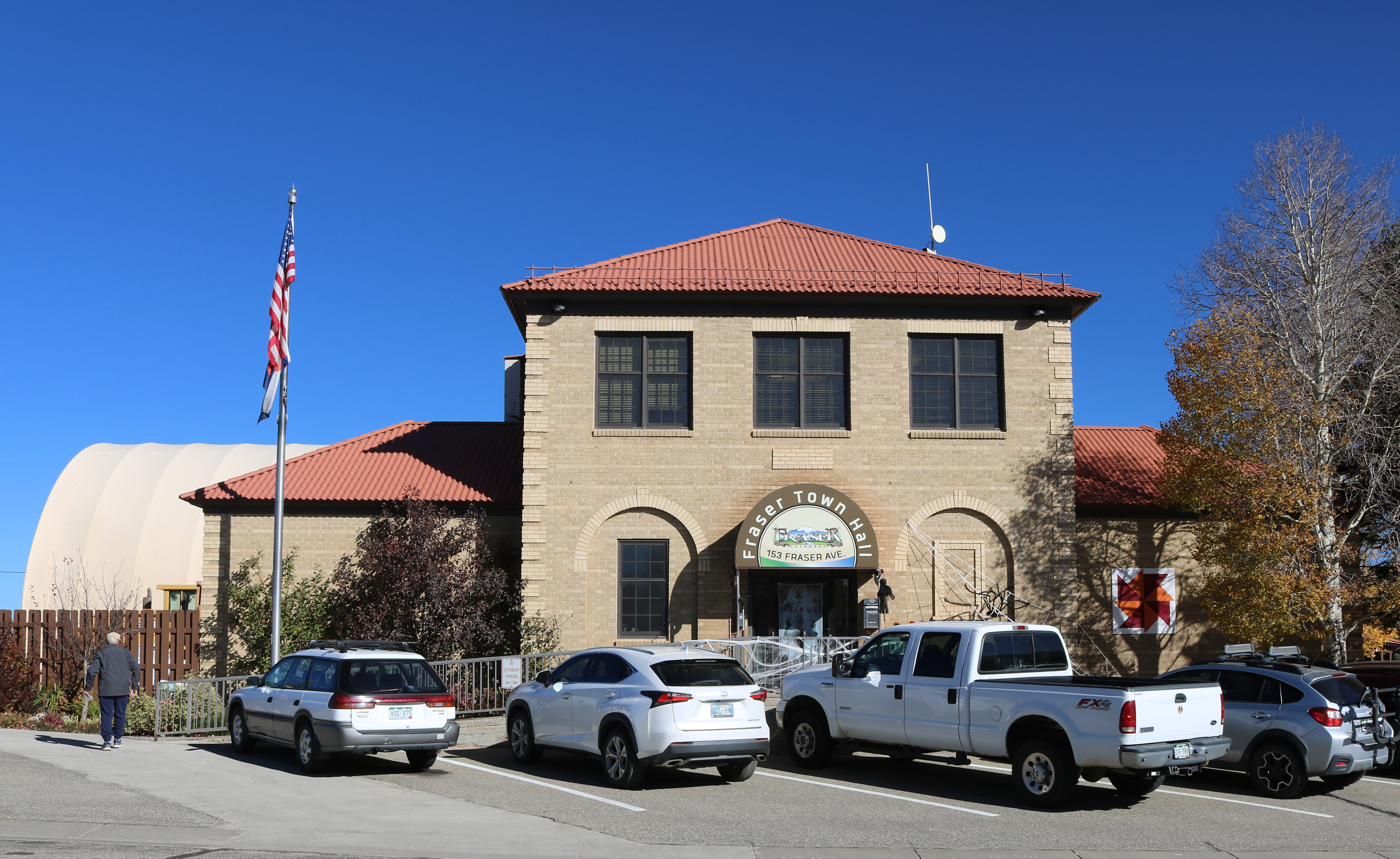
Fraser Town Hall

=== Transportation ===
Amtrak provides regular service to Fraser and nearby Winter Park (station code: WIP), operating its California Zephyr daily in each direction between Chicago, Illinois and Emeryville, California in the San Francisco Bay Area. In 2015, Amtrak also resumed seasonal ski train service to the Winter Park Resort, and in 2025 they added a stop in Fraser. The new Winter Park Express resumed ski train service that had been provided to the resort by Denver and Rio Grande Western Railroad's Ski Train for nearly 70 years.

The Lift Winter Park Transit provides year round bus service in The Town of Fraser with fixed route, paratransit, and commuter services. The Lift offers in town service and connections to Winter Park, CO, Winter Park Resort, and Granby, CO.

Bustang Outrider is a state regional bus service providing twice daily service to Fraser on the Craig-Denver line. The Morning run provides eastbound service to Idaho Springs, CO and Denver, CO. The afternoon/evening run provides westbound service to Steamboat Springs, CO, Craig, CO, and other intermediate stops.

Other transportation options include Home James Transportation and Grand Mountain Rides which have provided shared shuttle and private charter transportation since 198

== Notable people ==
- Susan Anderson, physician known as "Doc Susie"
- Carlota D. EspinoZa, American painter, muralist, and activist

== See also ==
- Byers Peak
- Arapaho National Forest
- Saint Louis Creek
