= Fraser Experimental Forest =

Outdoor research laboratory

- Fraser Biosphere Reserve
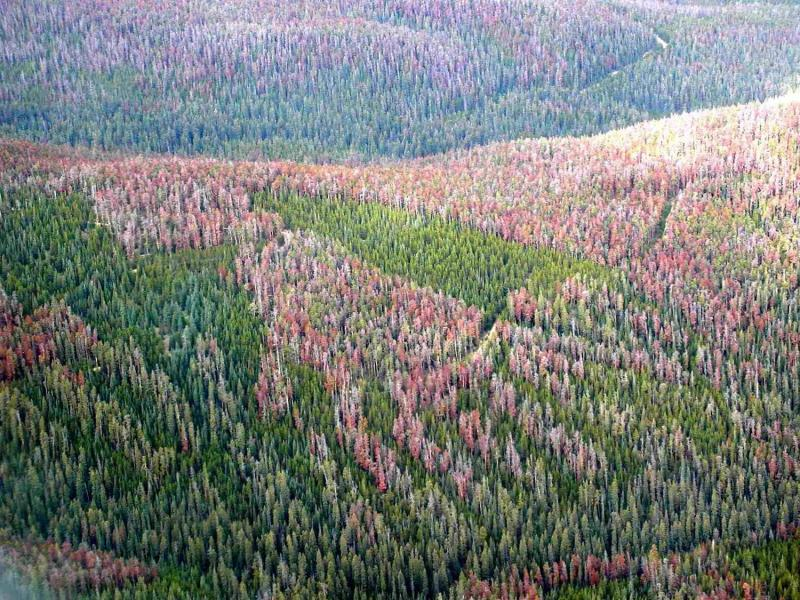
- A view of the Fraser Experimental Forest, 2007. The reddish areas show Mountain Pine Beetle damage.

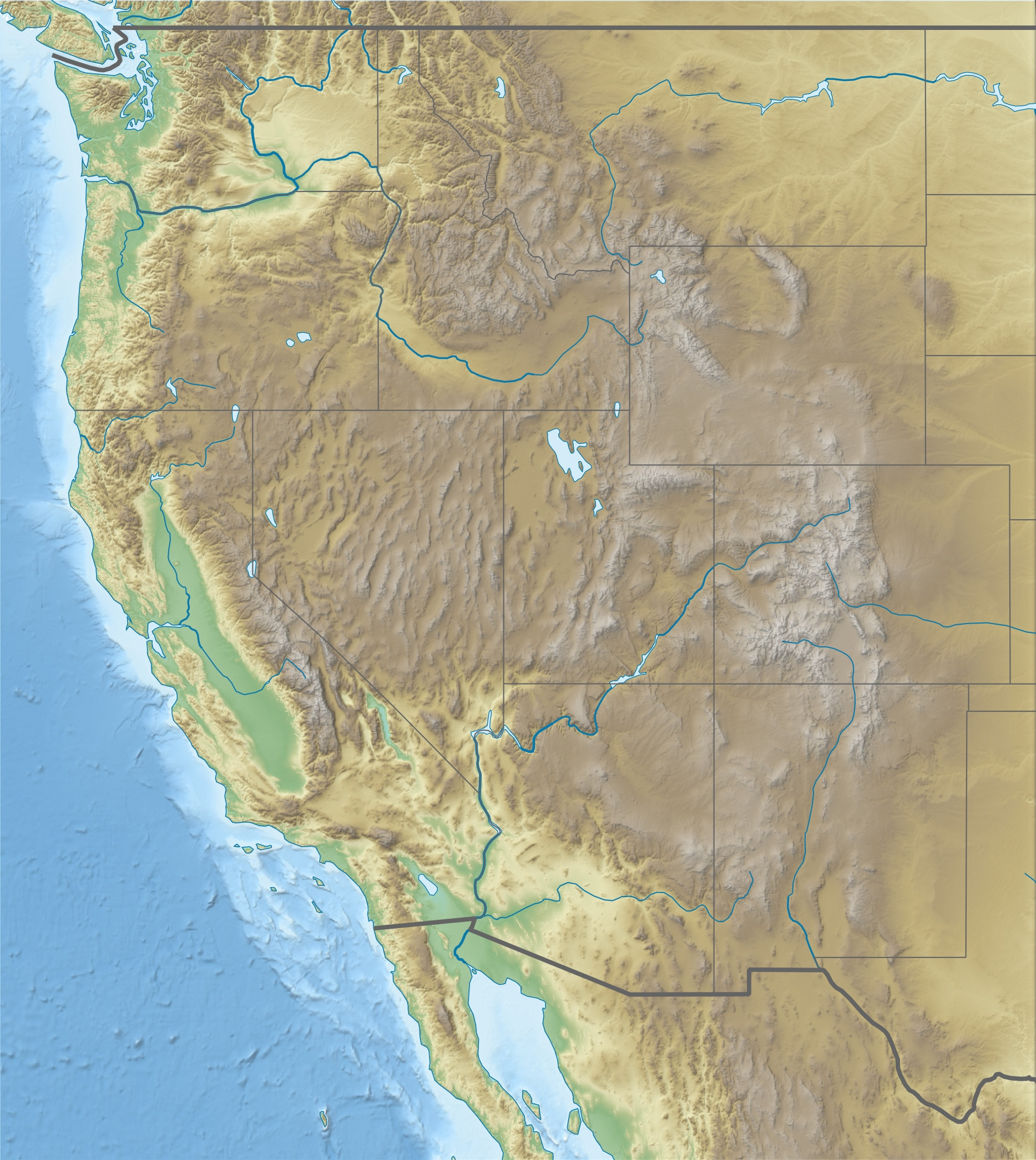
- Location within USA West
- Location: Arapaho National Forest, Colorado, USA
- Coordinates: 39°32′24″N 105°31′48″W
- Area: 9,328 hectares (36.02 sq mi)
- Governing body: United States Forest Service

The Fraser Experimental Forest is an outdoor research laboratory to study timber, water, wildlife management, and their integration in the high elevation subalpine coniferous forests. The experimental forest was established in 1937, and encompasses 9,328 hectares (36.02 sq mi). It is situated on the west side of the Continental Divide in north-central Colorado and includes the entire watershed of main Saint Louis Creek, a tributary of the Fraser River.

It is managed by the Rocky Mountain Research Station of the United States Forest Service and is located within the Arapaho National Forest. The forest was designated a UNESCO Biosphere Reserve in 1976, and was withdrawn from the UN reserve program as of June 14, 2017 at the request of the U.S. Government.

== Ecosystems ==
The Fraser Experimental Forest includes subalpine forests and alpine tundra typical of the central Rocky Mountains. In the forested areas below the timberline, Engelmann spruce (Picea engelmannii) and subalpine fir (Abies lasiocarpa) are the predominant trees, at higher elevations, on north slopes, and along streams. Lodgepole pine (Pinus contorta var. latifolia) is the predominant tree at lower elevations and on drier upper slopes. The majority of the forest was initiated after a fire in 1685. Pockets of older trees exist in draws and at higher elevations.

== Research ==
Fraser is one of few sites in the Rocky Mountains that maintains long-term records on hydrology, climate, forest structure and growth, and responses to forest management. Fraser provides the capacity for researchers to do whole-ecosystem manipulations in watersheds that are representative of high-elevation watersheds of southern and central Rockies.

Most early research was oriented toward timber or water cycle and production resulting from forest management. For this research, many long-term study plots were established in both lodgepole pine and Engelmann spruce, and 7 watersheds were monitored for streamflow, climate and snow. Some of the records now exceed 60 years in length. Research on forest/wildlife interactions began in the 1950s. Biogeochemical studies began in the 1960s, were restarted in the 1970s, and have been continuous since 1982. Much of this work is done in cooperation with the National Park Service.

== Sources ==
This article incorporates text from a free content work. Licensed under CC-BY-SA IGO 3.0. Text taken from "UNESCO - MAB Biosphere Reserves Directory". "Licensing page".
