= Granby, Colorado =

Town in Colorado, United States

- Statutory town
- Town of Granby
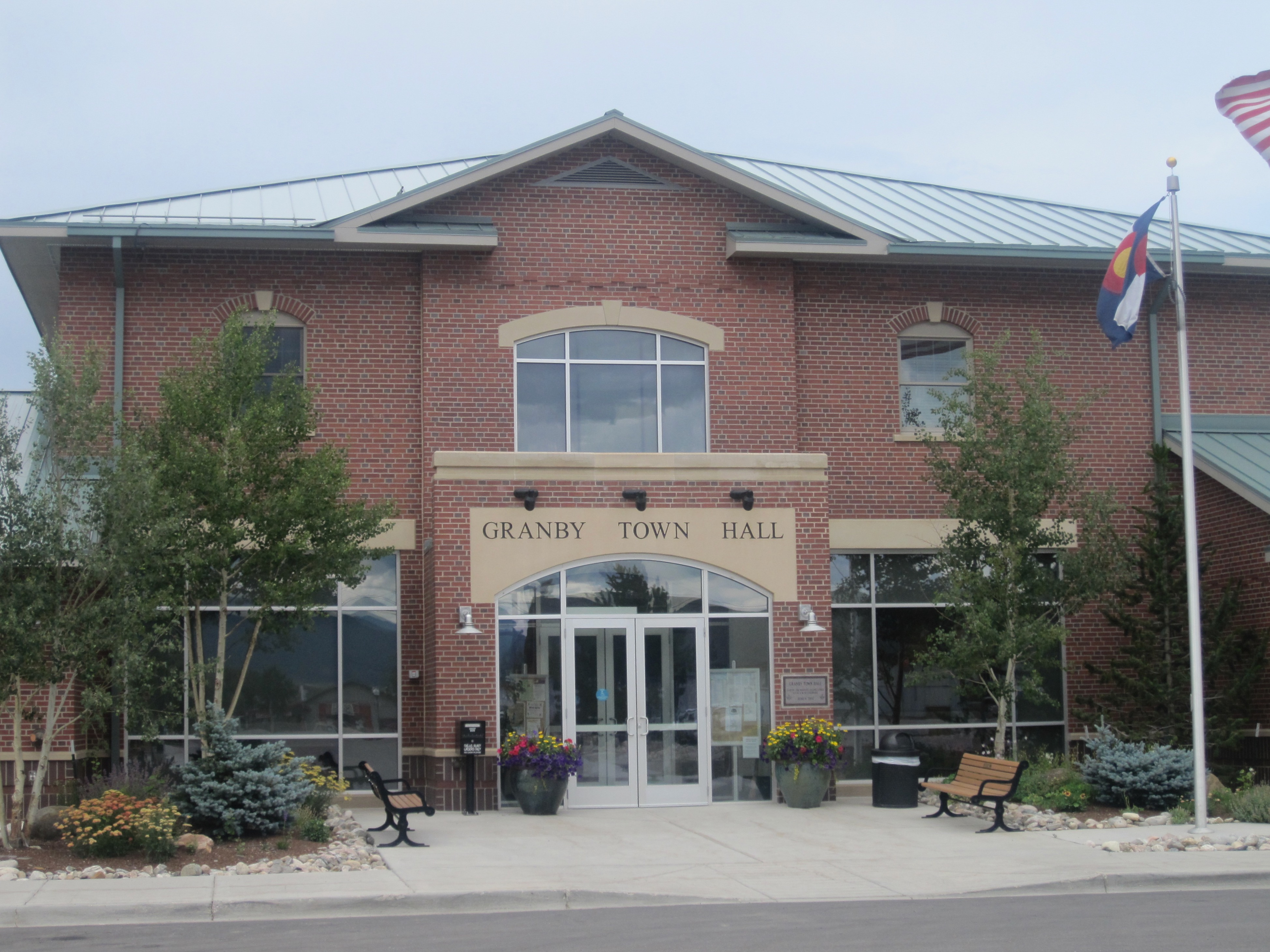
- Granby Town Hall

- Flag Logo
- Motto: "The heart of something grand"
- Interactive map of Granby, Colorado
- Coordinates: 40°03′53″N 105°55′10″W
- Country: United States
- State: Colorado
- County: Grand County
- Founded: 1905
- Incorporated (town): December 11, 1905

Government
  - Type: Statutory Town
  - Mayor: Joshua Hardy

Area
  - Total: 12.682 sq mi (32.845 km^{2})
  - Land: 12.682 sq mi (32.845 km^{2})
  - Water: 0 sq mi (0.000 km^{2})
- Elevation: 7,993 ft (2,436 m)

Population (2020)
  - Total: 2,079
  - Density: 164/sq mi (63/km^{2})
- Time zone: UTC−07:00 (MST)
  - Summer (DST): UTC−06:00 (MDT)
- ZIP code: 80446
- Area code: 970
- FIPS code: 08-31605
- GNIS town ID: 2412699
- Website: www.townofgranby.com

Granby is the statutory town that is the most populous municipality in Grand County, Colorado, United States. The town population was 2,079 at the 2020 United States census. Granby is situated along U.S. Highway 40 in the Middle Park basin, and it is about 85 miles (137 km) northwest of Denver and 14 miles (23 km) southwest of Rocky Mountain National Park.

== History ==
The town was founded in 1904 along the route of the Denver, Northwestern & Pacific Railway and was incorporated one year later. It was named after Granby Hillyer, a Denver lawyer who later served as the United States Attorney for that city's district.

Many Granby and Grand County residents are descended from pioneer settlers who arrived before the country was fully surveyed. Early families established themselves under the Homestead Act of 1862, which allowed easy access to land to those who would inhabit and improve upon the territory.

Since the turn of the century, families have contended for prime ranch land. Their waning ranch once covered approximately 20,000 acres (81 km^{2}) and was rich in cattle and hay.

=== Bulldozer rampage ===
Marvin Heemeyer was a local auto muffler shop owner who had multiple disputes with the town over zoning, sewage, and other issues. As a result, on June 4, 2004, Heemeyer went on a rampage through town, driving a modified bulldozer. Several buildings were damaged, including a bank, a hardware store, the concrete company, a utility service center, the town hall, the police department, and a former mayor's home. The rampage lasted 2 hours and 7 minutes, ending when the bulldozer got stuck attempting to go through the alleyway of Gambles Hardware Store. Heemeyer then committed suicide with a handgun. No other deaths occurred, but an estimated $7 million in damage was done.

== Geography ==
Granby sits at 7,935 feet (2,419 m) above sea level in the valley of the Fraser River, 2 miles (3 km) east of its mouth at the Colorado River. It is located in eastern Grand County in an area subject to average annual rainfall of 12 1/4 inches and annual snowfall of more than 128 inches (3,300 mm).

U.S. Route 40 passes through the center of town as Agate Avenue, leading south and east over Berthoud Pass to the Denver area, west 10 miles (16 km) to Hot Sulphur Springs, the Grand County seat. Kremmling is 27 miles (43 km) to the west on US 40. U.S. Route 34 intersects US 40 on the west side of Granby and leads northeast into Rocky Mountain National Park, crossing the mountains as Trail Ridge Road and reaching Estes Park 60 miles (97 km) northeast of Granby.

At the 2020 United States census, the town had a total area of 8,116 acres (32.845 km^{2}), all of it land.

=== Climate ===
This climate type is dominated by the winter season, a long, bitterly cold period with short, clear days, relatively little precipitation mostly in the form of snow, and low humidity. According to the Köppen Climate Classification system, Granby has a warm summer humid continental climate, abbreviated "Dfb" on climate maps.

Climate data for Granby, Colorado
| Month | Jan | Feb | Mar | Apr | May | Jun | Jul | Aug | Sep | Oct | Nov | Dec | Year |
|---|---|---|---|---|---|---|---|---|---|---|---|---|---|
| Mean daily maximum °F (°C) | 28 (−2) | 31 (−1) | 37 (3) | 47 (8) | 59 (15) | 69 (21) | 75 (24) | 73 (23) | 68 (20) | 56 (13) | 40 (4) | 30 (−1) | 51 (11) |
| Mean daily minimum °F (°C) | 1 (−17) | 1 (−17) | 9 (−13) | 20 (−7) | 29 (−2) | 36 (2) | 41 (5) | 40 (4) | 33 (1) | 24 (−4) | 14 (−10) | 5 (−15) | 21 (−6) |
| Average precipitation inches (mm) | 1.2 (30) | 0.8 (20) | 1.2 (30) | 1.1 (28) | 1.3 (33) | 1.2 (30) | 1.5 (38) | 1.7 (43) | 1.1 (28) | 0.8 (20) | 0.9 (23) | 1.4 (36) | 14.2 (360) |
Source: Weatherbase

== Demographics ==
Historical population
| Census | Pop. | Note | %± |
|---|---|---|---|
| 1910 | 40 | | — |
| 1920 | 32 | | −20.0% |
| 1930 | 90 | | 181.3% |
| 1940 | 251 | | 178.9% |
| 1950 | 463 | | 84.5% |
| 1960 | 503 | | 8.6% |
| 1970 | 554 | | 10.1% |
| 1980 | 963 | | 73.8% |
| 1990 | 966 | | 0.3% |
| 2000 | 1,525 | | 57.9% |
| 2010 | 1,864 | | 22.2% |
| 2020 | 2,079 | | 11.5% |
U.S. Decennial Census

=== 2020 census ===
As of the 2020 census, Granby had a population of 2,079.

The median age was 38.8 years. 21.9% of residents were under the age of 18 and 13.5% were 65 years of age or older. For every 100 females, there were 106.2 males, and for every 100 females age 18 and over, there were 109.4 males age 18 and over.

0.0% of residents lived in urban areas, while 100.0% lived in rural areas.

There were 865 households, of which 28.1% had children under the age of 18 living in them. Of all households, 44.4% were married-couple households, 24.3% were households with a male householder and no spouse or partner present, and 23.8% were households with a female householder and no spouse or partner present. About 30.8% of all households were made up of individuals, and 10.5% had someone living alone who was 65 years of age or older.

There were 1,765 housing units, of which 51.0% were vacant. The homeowner vacancy rate was 1.9% and the rental vacancy rate was 11.4%.

Racial composition as of the 2020 census
| Race | Number | Percent |
|---|---|---|
| White | 1,694 | 81.5% |
| Black or African American | 15 | 0.7% |
| American Indian and Alaska Native | 15 | 0.7% |
| Asian | 11 | 0.5% |
| Native Hawaiian and Other Pacific Islander | 0 | 0.0% |
| Some other race | 196 | 9.4% |
| Two or more races | 148 | 7.1% |
| Hispanic or Latino (of any race) | 374 | 18.0% |

=== 2000 census ===
As of the census of 2000, there were 1,525 people, 579 households, and 390 families residing in the town. The population density was 856.2 inhabitants per square mile (330.6/km^{2}). There were 628 housing units at an average density of 352.6 per square mile (136.1/km^{2}). The racial makeup of the town was 96.26% White, 0.46% African American, 0.26% Native American, 0.98% Asian, 0.07% Pacific Islander, 1.44% from other races, and 0.52% from two or more races. Hispanic or Latino of any race were 3.61% of the population.

There were 579 households, out of which 37.3% had children under the age of 18 living with them, 55.3% were married couples living together, 7.6% had a female householder with no husband present, and 32.5% were non-families. 21.9% of all households were made up of individuals, and 6.4% had someone living alone who was 65 years of age or older. The average household size was 2.59 and the average family size was 3.05.

In the town, the population was spread out, with 28.1% under the age of 18, 9.1% from 18 to 24, 33.5% from 25 to 44, 22.7% from 45 to 64, and 6.6% who were 65 years of age or older. The median age was 34 years. For every 100 females, there were 98.6 males. For every 100 females age 18 and over, there were 104.3 males.

The median income for a household in the town was $46,667, and the median income for a family was $55,250. Males had a median income of $35,455 versus $24,417 for females. The per capita income for the town was $21,224. About 4.0% of families and 5.8% of the population were below the poverty line, including 3.9% of those under the age of 18 and 9.0% of those ages 65 and older.

== Transportation ==
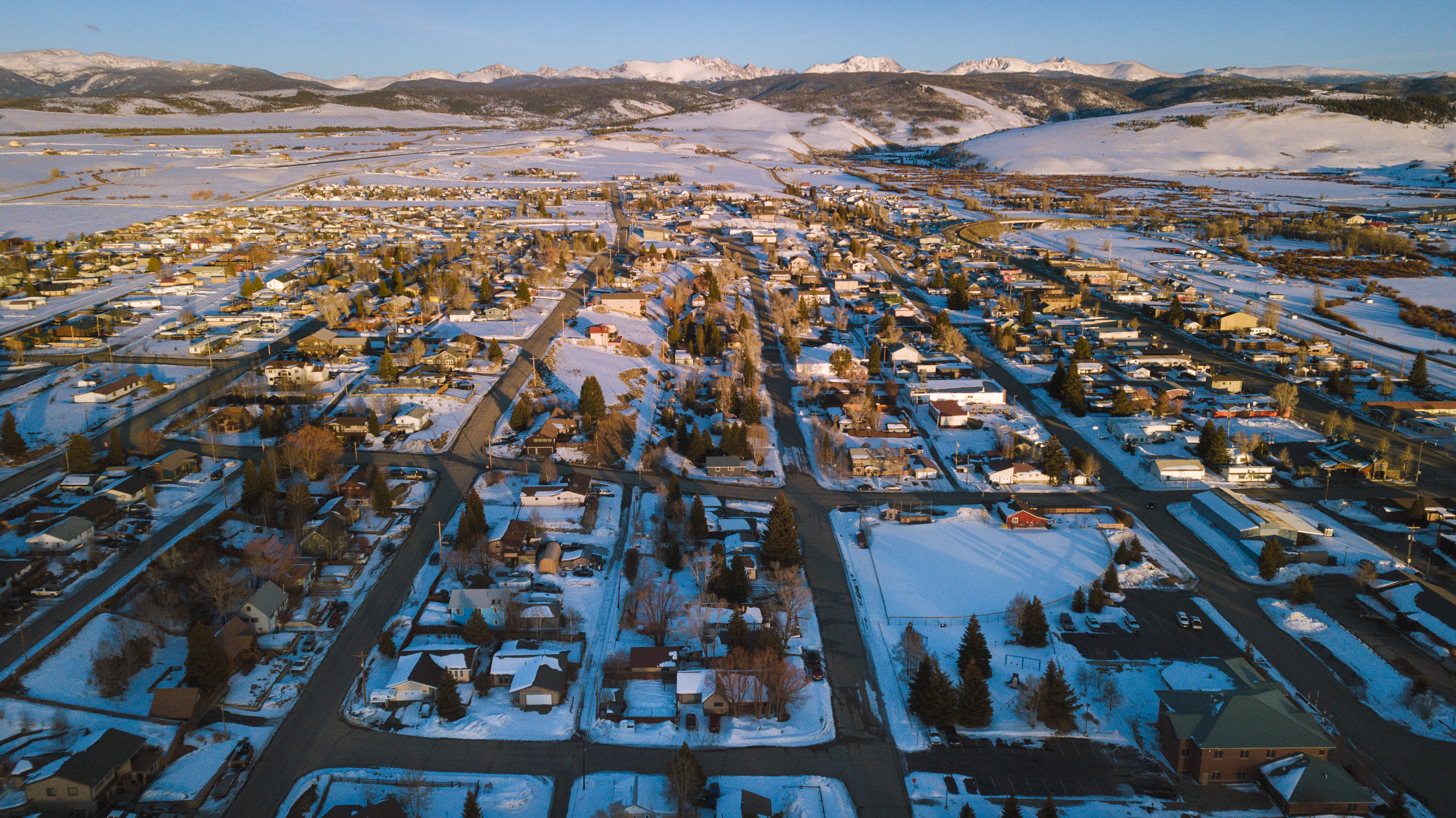
Granby in winter.

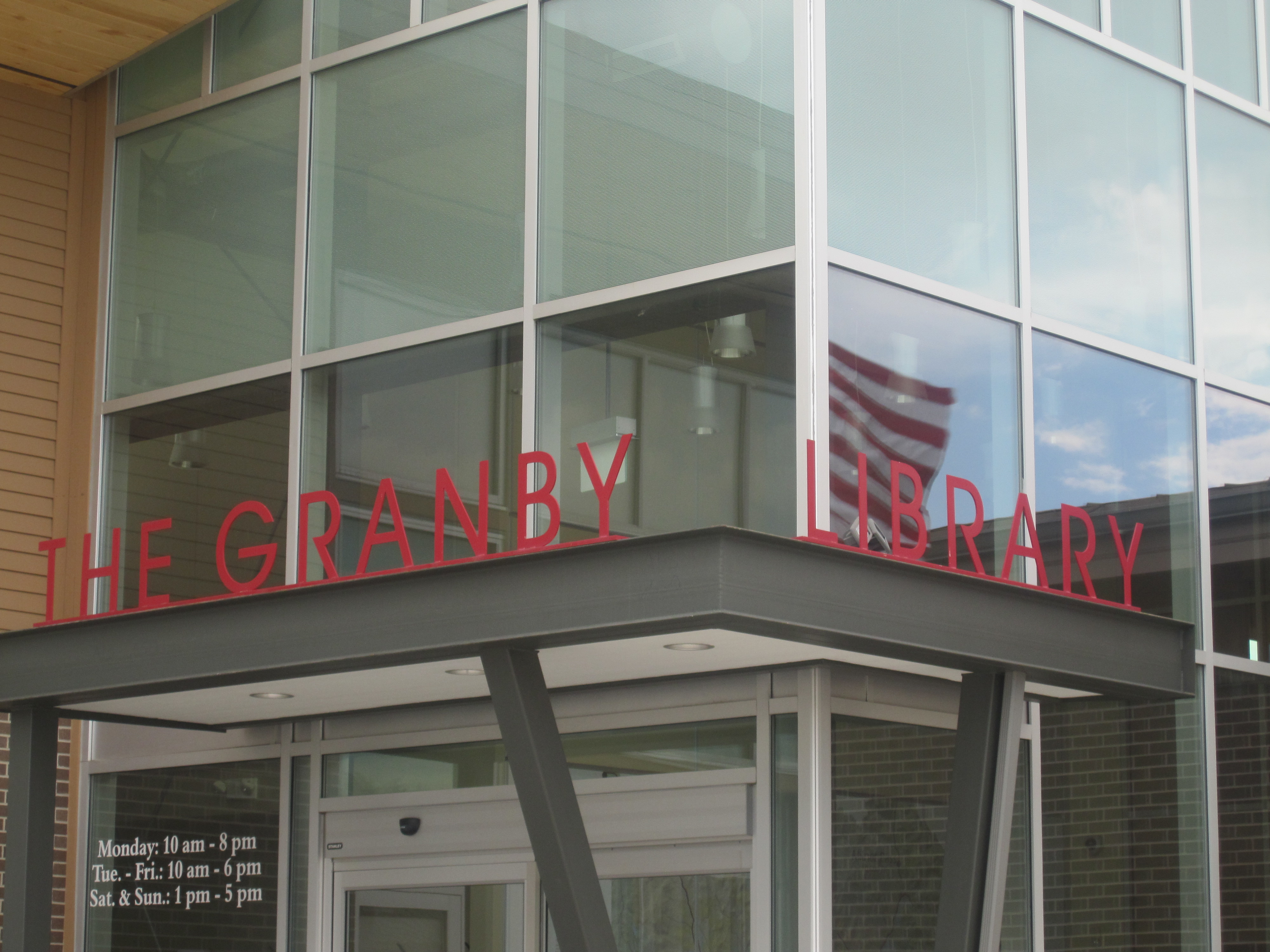
The new Granby Public Library.

Amtrak, the national passenger rail system, provides daily service to Granby, operating its California Zephyr daily in both directions between Chicago and Emeryville, California, across the bay from San Francisco.

Granby-Grand County Airport (IATA: GNB, ICAO: KGNB, FAA LID: GNB), a small airport one mile east of town, serves as a stopover for transient general aviation flights, as well as hosts some local aviation activity. There are currently no scheduled passenger carrier flights into or out of the airport, which features a 5,000-foot-long (1,500 m) by 75-foot-wide (23 m) asphalt runway. Services at the airport are limited to aviation fuel for both piston and jet/turboprop aircraft. According to the Official Airline Guide (OAG), the airport was previously served by Rocky Mountain Airways which operated scheduled passenger flights to Denver during the mid 1970s with small de Havilland Canada DHC-6 Twin Otter turboprop aircraft.

== Notable residents ==
- Penny Rafferty Hamilton, aviation educator, writer, and photographer
- Marvin Heemeyer, perpetrator of the 2004 Granby rampage in an armored bulldozer

== See also ==
- Middle Park (Colorado basin)
- Rocky Mountain National Park
