= Rocky Mountain Research Station =

The Rocky Mountain Research Station (RMRS) is one of five regional units that make up the United States Forest Service Research and Development organization — the most extensive natural resources research organization in the world. The station headquarters are located in Fort Collins, Colorado. Research is structured within eight science program areas. The Station employs over 400 permanent full-time employees, including roughly 100 research scientists.

== Research program areas ==
- Air, Water and Aquatic Environments
- Aldo Leopold Wilderness Research Institute
- Fire, Fuel, and Smoke Science
- Forests and Woodlands Ecosystems Research
- Grassland, Shrubland and Desert Ecosystem
- Human Dimensions
- Inventory, Monitoring and Analysis Science
- Wildlife and Terrestrial Ecosystems

== Laboratories ==
- Forestry Sciences Laboratory, Albuquerque, NM
- Forestry Sciences Laboratory, Bozeman, MT
- Fire Sciences Laboratory, Missoula, MT
- Aquatic Sciences Laboratory, Boise, ID
- Forestry Sciences Laboratory, Flagstaff, AZ
- Headquarters, Fort Collins, CO
- Forestry Sciences Laboratory, Logan, UT
- Forestry Sciences Laboratory, Missoula, MT
- Aldo Leopold Wilderness Research Institute, Missoula, MT
- Forestry Sciences Laboratory, Moscow, ID
- Ogden Service Center, Ogden, UT
- Forestry Sciences Laboratory, Ogden, UT
- Shrub Sciences Laboratory, Provo, UT
- Forestry Sciences Laboratory, Rapid City, SD
- Forestry Sciences Laboratory, University of Nevada, Reno NV

== Experimental forests and ranges ==
- Black Hills Experimental Forest
- Boise Basin Experimental Forest
- Coram Experimental Forest
- Deception Creek Experimental Forest
- Desert Experimental Range
- Fort Valley Experimental Forest
- Fraser Experimental Forest
- Glacier Lakes Ecosystem Experiments Site (GLEES)
- Great Basin Experimental Range
- Long Valley Experimental Forest
- Manitou Experimental Forest
- Priest River Experimental Forest
- Sierra Ancha Experimental Forest
- Tenderfoot Creek Experimental Forest
