= Byers Canyon Shooting Range =

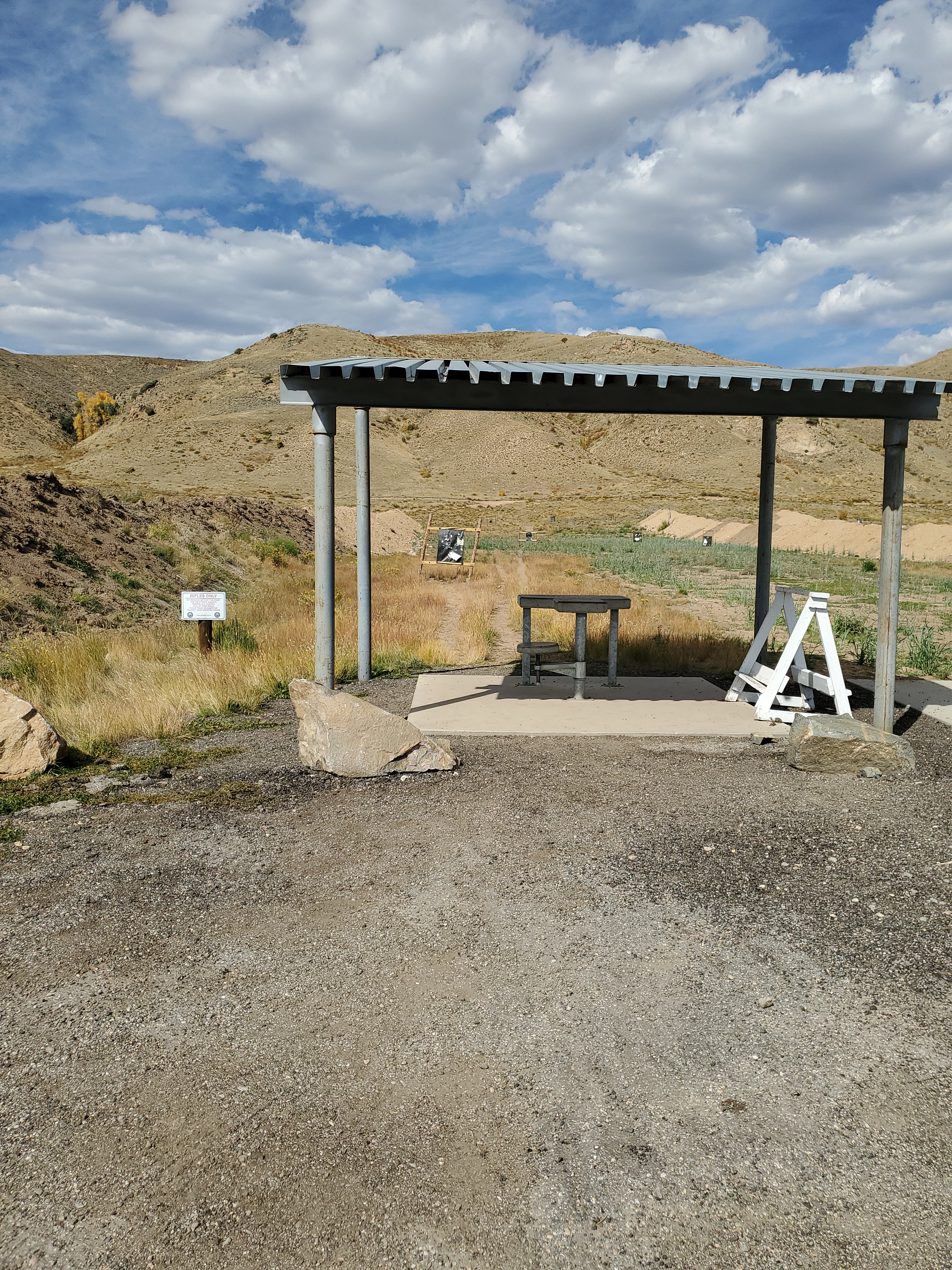
Roofed bench rest shooting position at Byers Canyon Rifle Range

Byers Canyon Shooting Range is part of the Colorado Parks and Wildlife Hot Sulphur Springs State Wildlife Area. The 80-acre (32 ha) facility is 7,700 feet (2,300 m) above sea level on the north side of U.S. Highway 40, four miles (6.4 km) west of Hot Sulphur Springs, Colorado. The range is usually open from sunrise to sunset from late April until early January, although users should check current hunting, fishing and land use regulations when planning to visit. All visitors 16 or older must have a valid hunting or fishing license or State Wildlife Area pass.

== History ==
The state wildlife area was acquired in 1940 to provide a winter grazing area for big game animals; and is closed to public access from January through April so the animals may forage undisturbed through the winter. The site has been used as a shooting range since the early 1970s. The facility has been developed for sighting in centerfire hunting rifles. There are nine parallel ranges with individually roofed bench rest shooting positions spaced 50 yards (46 m) apart and separated by earthen berms so shooters may safely inspect and change targets while shooting continues on adjacent ranges. Each range has a target position at 25 yards (23 m) for coarse sight adjustments, and target positions at 100 yards (91 m), and 200 yards (180 m) for more precise adjustments and trajectory determination. The facilities have been used by approximately 10,000 vehicles annually.

== Range facilities ==
- Archery range with straw bales
- Shotgun range
- Two-lane .22 rimfire range with 25-yard (23 m) and 50-yard (46 m) targets
- Four-lane handgun range
- Nine-lane centerfire rifle range with wheelchair access to 100 yards (91 m)
- Public toilets
