= Hot Sulphur Springs, Colorado =

Town in Colorado, United States

- Statutory Town
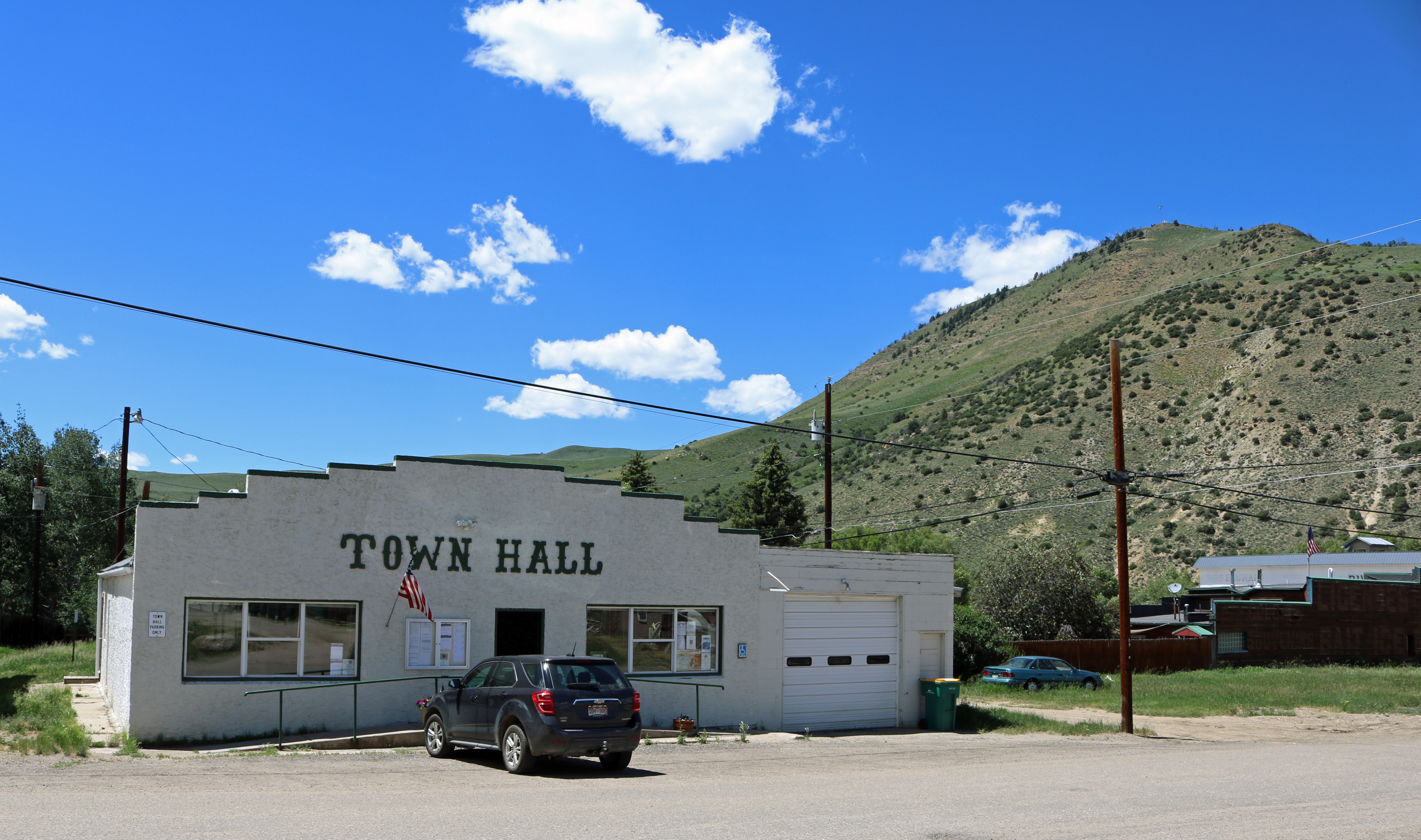
- Town Hall on Aspen Street

- Location of Hot Sulphur Springs in Grand County, Colorado.
- Coordinates: 40°04′30″N 106°06′11″W
- Country: United States
- State: Colorado
- County: Grand County Seat
- Established: 1860
- Incorporated (town): April 1, 1903

Government
  - Type: Statutory Town

Area
  - Total: 0.77 sq mi (1.99 km^{2})
  - Land: 0.77 sq mi (1.99 km^{2})
  - Water: 0 sq mi (0.00 km^{2})
- Elevation: 7,697 ft (2,346 m)

Population (2020)
  - Total: 687
  - Density: 894/sq mi (345/km^{2})
- Time zone: UTC-7 (MST)
  - Summer (DST): UTC-6 (MDT)
- ZIP code: 80451 (PO Box)
- Area code: 970
- FIPS code: 08-37600
- GNIS feature ID: 2412770
- Website: townofhotsulphursprings.colorado.gov

Hot Sulphur Springs is a statutory town and the county seat of Grand County, Colorado, United States. The town is located near Byers Canyon between Granby and Kremmling, 95 miles (153 km) northwest of Denver and 30 miles (48 km) northwest of Winter Park. The town population was 687 at the 2020 census. Its elevation is 7,680 feet (2,340 m).

== History ==
Hot Sulphur Springs was originally a winter campground for Native Americans who came to use the hot springs for medicinal purposes. In 1840 William Newton Byers, founder of the Rocky Mountain News, was the first European American to document the springs. The town was established in 1860, making it the oldest town in the county, originally named "Saratoga West" and sometimes called "Warm Springs".

In 1863, the town site was bought by Byers in a backroom deal with a Minnesota Sioux woman despite a treaty naming the Ute tribe as the lawful owners, who unsuccessfully sued Byers, while Byers and territorial governors William Gilpin and John Evans launched a "The Utes Must Go" campaign with the help of the U.S. Cavalry. Wishing to create a world-famous spa and resort ("the American Switzerland"), Byers changed the name and surveyed, platted, and named the streets, attracting famous visitors including Zane Grey and John Wesley Powell. The first pool house was built ca. 1900.

When Grand County was formed, Hot Sulphur Springs was the first county seat from 1874 to 1882, after which it moved to Grand Lake. The county seat returned in 1888 and has been there ever since.

Byers died on March 25, 1903. The town was incorporated on April 1, 1903. His original family cabin is located at 204 Byers Avenue along what is now Highway 40. The building is currently the county's only mortuary.

The first winter carnival in Hot Sulphur Springs was held on December 31, 1911. The success of this event led to a three-day carnival which took place on February 10–12, 1912. The following winter, a second annual winter carnival was planned in conjunction with the first Steamboat Springs Winter Sports Carnival. This series of events led to the creation of Howelsen Hill Ski Area in Steamboat Springs, and is credited with playing a large role in the birth of the Colorado ski industry.

The big plans of Byers were prevented by the slow arrival of the railroad in 1928 (after the construction of the Moffat Tunnel), and eventually the railroad quit stopping there, although the town is still a resort attracting many visitors. The first lodging rooms opened in 1926.

In 1997 the resort was extensively renovated, and the Ute tribal spiritual leader blessed the waters at the opening ceremony, attended by almost 1,000, which welcomed the Utes to use the springs once again.

Payday was always the last day of the month and was considered a dangerous day because of the many gunfights that occurred. Because Halloween is October 31, the last day of the month, the people of the town celebrated Halloween on the 30th to keep children safe, which continues to the present day.

The Pioneer Village Museum is also located in Hot Sulphur Springs.

== Geography ==
Hot Sulphur Springs is located in central Grand County, along the Colorado River, just east (upstream) of where the river enters Byers Canyon. U.S. Route 40 passes through the center of town as Byers Avenue; it leads 10 miles (16 km) east to Granby, the largest town in the county, and 17 miles (27 km) west to Kremmling. The Byers Canyon Shooting Range west of town is part of the Colorado Parks and Wildlife Hot Sulphur Springs State Wildlife Area providing a winter foraging area for big game animals.

According to the United States Census Bureau, the town has a total area of 0.77 square miles (2.0 km^{2}), all of it land.

=== Climate ===
This climate type is dominated by the winter season, a long, cold period with short, clear days, relatively little precipitation mostly in the form of snow, and low humidity. The climate is similar to that of nearby Kremmling.

== Demographics ==
Historical population
Census	Pop.	Note	%±
1880	100		—
1910	182		—
1920	123		−32.4%
1930	142		15.4%
1940	235		65.5%
1950	263		11.9%
1960	237		−9.9%
1970	220		−7.2%
1980	405		84.1%
1990	347		−14.3%
2000	521		50.1%
2010	663		27.3%
2020	687		3.6%
U.S. Decennial Census

== Hot springs ==
The natural thermal springs at Hot Sulphur Springs are located in just outside the town limits on the west side of the Colorado River. The natural hot springs are heated from geothermal activity. Historically, the indigenous Ute people used the springs, but as more European settlers, and American soldiers arrived in the area they were pushed out although the court system declared the Utes the rightful owners. In more recent years a resort has been built at the hot springs that offers several soaking pools and tubs with temperatures ranging from 98 °F to 112 °F.

=== Water profile ===
The hot mineral water emerges from the source at 125 °F / 52 °C at a rate of 200,000 gallons per day. The mineral content of the water consists of calcium (15ppm), chloride (145ppm), fluoride (11ppm), lithium (1.3ppm), magnesium (3.2ppm), potassium (24ppm), sodium (435ppm), sulfate (145ppm). Trace minerals include arsenic, iron, manganese and zinc.

== See also ==
- Arapaho National Forest
