= Kremmling, Colorado =

Town in Colorado, United States

- Statutory Town
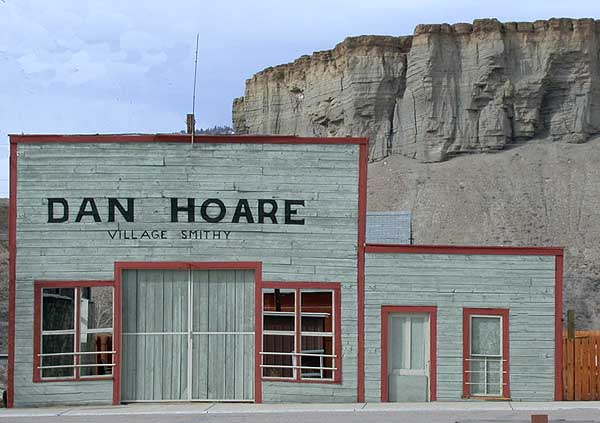
- Tourist-oriented wooden structure in Kremmling

- Location of Kremmling in Grand County, Colorado.
- Coordinates: 40°03′18″N 106°22′22″W
- Country: United States
- State: Colorado
- County: Grand
- Founded: 1881
- Incorporated (town): May 14, 1904

Government
  - Type: Statutory Town

Area
  - Total: 1.31 sq mi (3.39 km^{2})
  - Land: 1.31 sq mi (3.39 km^{2})
  - Water: 0 sq mi (0.00 km^{2})
- Elevation: 7,399 ft (2,255 m)

Population (2020)
  - Total: 1,509
  - Density: 1,150/sq mi (445/km^{2})
- Time zone: UTC-7 (Mountain (MST))
  - Summer (DST): UTC-6 (MDT)
- ZIP code: 80459
- Area code: 970
- FIPS code: 08-41560
- GNIS feature ID: 2412848
- Website: Town of Kremmling

The Town of Kremmling is a Statutory Town in Grand County, Colorado, United States. The town population was 1,509 at the 2020 United States census. The town sits along the upper Colorado River in the lower arid section of Middle Park between Byers Canyon and Gore Canyon. The town was founded in 1881 during the Colorado Silver Boom days, but the lack of mineral resources in the nearby mountains made the town grow very slowly in the early days.

== History ==
The settlement started with only a general store, run by a man named Rudolph "Kare" Kremmling, built on the north side of Muddy Creek. In 1881, two brothers, Aaron and John Kinsey, made part of their ranch into a town and called it Kinsey City. Kare moved his store across the river to the new site and soon people were calling this place Kremmling. The original post office was called Kinsey City and ran from 1881 to 1885, with Kare Kremmling the first postmaster. The name Kremmling was not officially recognized until 1895. After the Moffat railroad—the Denver, Northwestern & Pacific Railway—arrived in July 1906, Kremmling became the county's central shipping point. It was incorporated May 14, 1904. In the 20th century, ranching became the main industry in the valley in the vicinity of the town. In 1906, Kasper Schuler built the first brick building in town. The Schuler bottling works occupied the first floor, while the Schuler House, a boarding house run by Miss Kienholz, occupied the second. In 1933, the building became the Hotel Eastin.

Kremmling was featured in W. Eugene Smith's photographic essay "Country Doctor" in the September 20, 1948, issue of LIFE.

== Geography ==
According to the United States Census Bureau, the town has a total area of 1.3 square miles (3.4 km^{2}), all of it land.

The town is located approximately at the mouth of both the Blue River, which descends from the south, and Muddy Creek, which descends from the north. This location provides valley access to Dillon, Colorado, and the ski resorts of Summit County, and Rabbit Ears Pass (renowned for world-class snowmobiling) at the Continental Divide, which then descends into Steamboat Springs.

=== Climate ===
This climate type is dominated by the winter season, a long, bitterly cold period with short, clear days, relatively little precipitation mostly in the form of snow, and low humidity. According to the Köppen Climate Classification system, Kremmling has a continental climate, abbreviated "Dfb" on climate maps.

Climate data for Kremmling, Colorado, 1991–2020 normals, extremes 1908–present
Month	Jan	Feb	Mar	Apr	May	Jun	Jul	Aug	Sep	Oct	Nov	Dec	Year
Record high °F (°C)	55 (13)	61 (16)	69 (21)	77 (25)	85 (29)	92 (33)	94 (34)	93 (34)	89 (32)	81 (27)	69 (21)	60 (16)	94 (34)
Mean maximum °F (°C)	44.3 (6.8)	47.2 (8.4)	59.3 (15.2)	69.7 (20.9)	78.1 (25.6)	86.0 (30.0)	89.3 (31.8)	86.7 (30.4)	82.7 (28.2)	73.4 (23.0)	58.3 (14.6)	47.3 (8.5)	89.7 (32.1)
Mean daily maximum °F (°C)	26.4 (−3.1)	31.3 (−0.4)	43.3 (6.3)	53.3 (11.8)	63.7 (17.6)	75.5 (24.2)	81.3 (27.4)	79.0 (26.1)	71.7 (22.1)	58.1 (14.5)	42.4 (5.8)	28.7 (−1.8)	54.6 (12.5)
Daily mean °F (°C)	12.4 (−10.9)	17.2 (−8.2)	29.7 (−1.3)	38.7 (3.7)	47.6 (8.7)	56.9 (13.8)	62.8 (17.1)	60.7 (15.9)	52.8 (11.6)	40.7 (4.8)	27.9 (−2.3)	14.8 (−9.6)	38.5 (3.6)
Mean daily minimum °F (°C)	−1.5 (−18.6)	3.1 (−16.1)	16.0 (−8.9)	24.0 (−4.4)	31.4 (−0.3)	38.3 (3.5)	44.2 (6.8)	42.4 (5.8)	33.8 (1.0)	23.4 (−4.8)	13.4 (−10.3)	0.9 (−17.3)	22.5 (−5.3)
Mean minimum °F (°C)	−22.9 (−30.5)	−17.9 (−27.7)	−3.9 (−19.9)	11.6 (−11.3)	20.8 (−6.2)	29.9 (−1.2)	36.5 (2.5)	34.7 (1.5)	22.6 (−5.2)	9.2 (−12.7)	−6.0 (−21.1)	−19.4 (−28.6)	−26.7 (−32.6)
Record low °F (°C)	−46 (−43)	−49 (−45)	−36 (−38)	−13 (−25)	9 (−13)	20 (−7)	26 (−3)	22 (−6)	11 (−12)	−13 (−25)	−31 (−35)	−42 (−41)	−49 (−45)
Average precipitation inches (mm)	0.73 (19)	0.72 (18)	0.72 (18)	1.15 (29)	1.42 (36)	0.88 (22)	1.40 (36)	1.31 (33)	1.28 (33)	0.91 (23)	0.74 (19)	0.74 (19)	12.00 (305)
Average snowfall inches (cm)	10.7 (27)	9.1 (23)	6.0 (15)	5.8 (15)	1.9 (4.8)	0.0 (0.0)	0.0 (0.0)	0.0 (0.0)	0.1 (0.25)	3.1 (7.9)	6.5 (17)	9.2 (23)	52.4 (132.95)
Average precipitation days (≥ 0.01 in)	7.9	7.3	6.4	7.6	8.4	6.6	10.0	11.2	8.8	6.0	6.6	7.0	93.8
Average snowy days (≥ 0.1 in)	8.9	7.6	5.6	4.0	1.0	0.1	0.0	0.0	0.2	1.7	6.0	8.1	43.2
Source 1: NOAA
Source 2: National Weather Service

== Demographics ==
Historical population
Census	Pop.	Note	%±
1910	141		—
1920	254		80.1%
1930	261		2.8%
1940	567		117.2%
1950	623		9.9%
1960	576		−7.5%
1970	764		32.6%
1980	1,296		69.6%
1990	1,166		−10.0%
2000	1,578		35.3%
2010	1,444		−8.5%
2020	1,509		4.5%
U.S. Decennial Census

As of the census of 2000, there were 1,578 people, 595 households, and 423 families residing in the town. The population density was 1,185.9 inhabitants per square mile (457.9/km^{2}). There were 646 housing units at an average density of 485.5 units per square mile (187.5 units/km^{2}). The racial makeup of the town was 92.90% White, 0.06% African American, 0.25% Native American, 0.25% Asian, 0.13% Pacific Islander, 4.12% from other races, and 2.28% from two or more races. Hispanic or Latino of any race were 8.56% of the population.

There were 595 households, out of which 38.8% had children under the age of 18 living with them, 56.3% were married couples living together, 8.4% had a female householder with no husband present, and 28.9% were non-families. 24.4% of all households were made up of individuals, and 6.7% had someone living alone who was 65 years of age or older. The average household size was 2.58 and the average family size was 3.07.

In the town, the population was spread out, with 29.0% under the age of 18, 8.4% from 18 to 24, 33.6% from 25 to 44, 20.8% from 45 to 64, and 8.1% who were 65 years of age or older. The median age was 34 years. For every 100 females, there were 101.8 males. For every 100 females age 18 and over, there were 109.0 males.

The median income for a household in the town was $45,605, and the median income for a family was $51,023. Males had a median income of $38,333 versus $25,385 for females. The per capita income for the town was $19,687. About 8.2% of families and 8.1% of the population were below the poverty line, including 13.6% of those under age 18 and 1.6% of those age 65 or over.-->

=== 2020 census ===
As of the 2020 census, Kremmling had a population of 1,509. The median age was 38.3 years. 23.7% of residents were under the age of 18 and 13.6% of residents were 65 years of age or older. For every 100 females there were 107.6 males, and for every 100 females age 18 and over there were 107.4 males age 18 and over.

0.0% of residents lived in urban areas, while 100.0% lived in rural areas.

There were 619 households in Kremmling, of which 28.8% had children under the age of 18 living in them. Of all households, 43.8% were married-couple households, 26.2% were households with a male householder and no spouse or partner present, and 22.9% were households with a female householder and no spouse or partner present. About 35.1% of all households were made up of individuals and 16.5% had someone living alone who was 65 years of age or older.

There were 678 housing units, of which 8.7% were vacant. The homeowner vacancy rate was 2.7% and the rental vacancy rate was 3.5%.

Racial composition as of the 2020 census
Race	Number	Percent
White	1,250	82.8%
Black or African American	8	0.5%
American Indian and Alaska Native	9	0.6%
Asian	3	0.2%
Native Hawaiian and Other Pacific Islander	2	0.1%
Some other race	137	9.1%
Two or more races	100	6.6%
Hispanic or Latino (of any race)	280	18.6%

== See also ==
- Grand County, Colorado
