= Grand County, Colorado =

County in Colorado, United States

- County
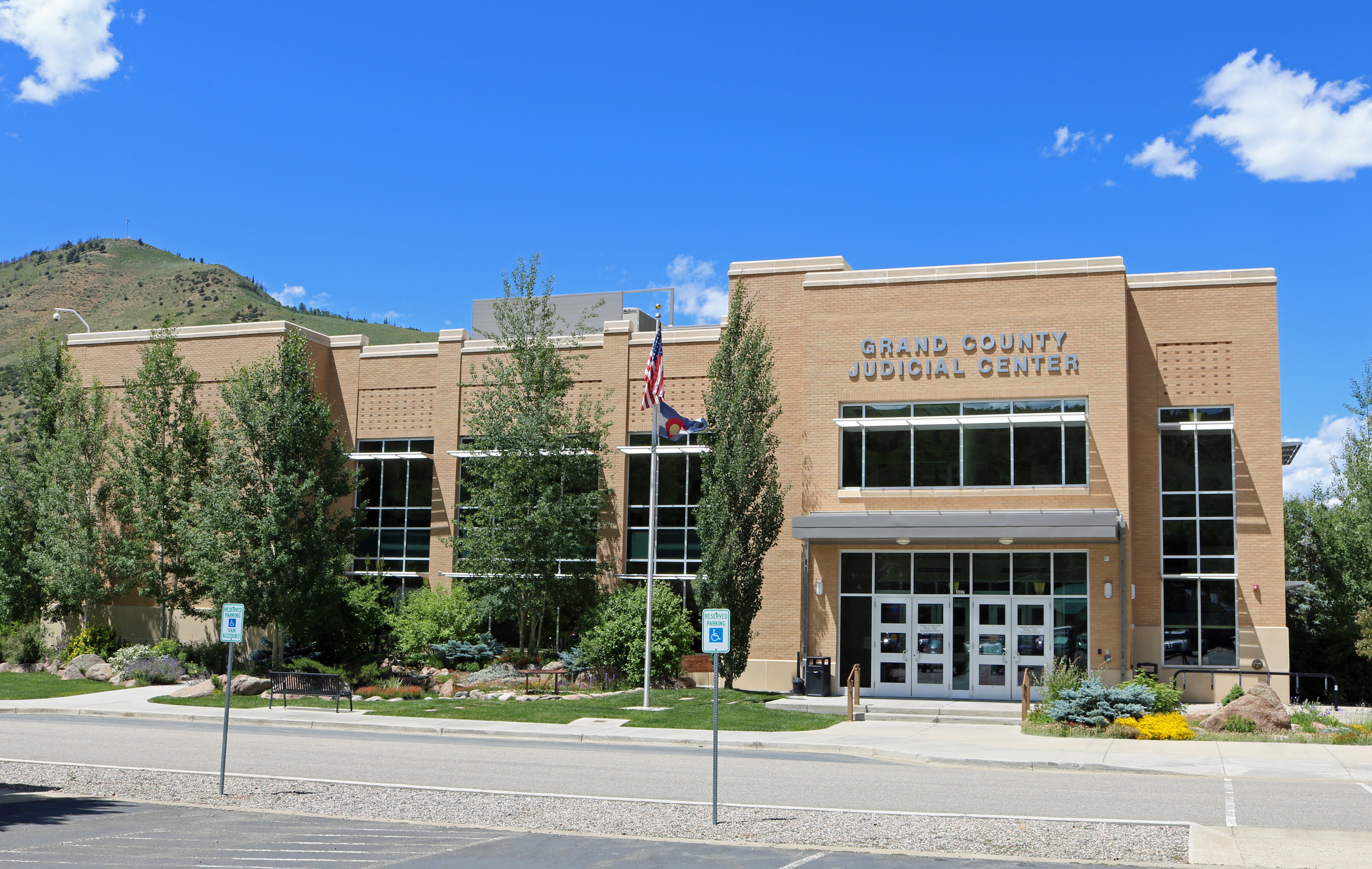
- The Grand County Judicial Center in Hot Sulphur Springs, July 2016

- Seal

- Location within the U.S. state of Colorado
- Coordinates: 40.10°N 106.12°W
- Country: United States
- State: Colorado
- Founded: February 2, 1874
- Named for: Grand Lake and Grand River
- Seat: Hot Sulphur Springs
- Largest town: Granby

Area
  - Total: 1,870 sq mi (4,800 km^{2})
  - Land: 1,846 sq mi (4,780 km^{2})
  - Water: 23 sq mi (60 km^{2}) 1.2%

Population (2020)
  - Total: 15,717
  - Estimate (2025): 16,496 ▲
  - Density: 8.5/sq mi (3.3/km^{2})
- Time zone: UTC−7 (Mountain)
  - Summer (DST): UTC−6 (MDT)
- Congressional district: 2nd
- Website: co.grand.co.us

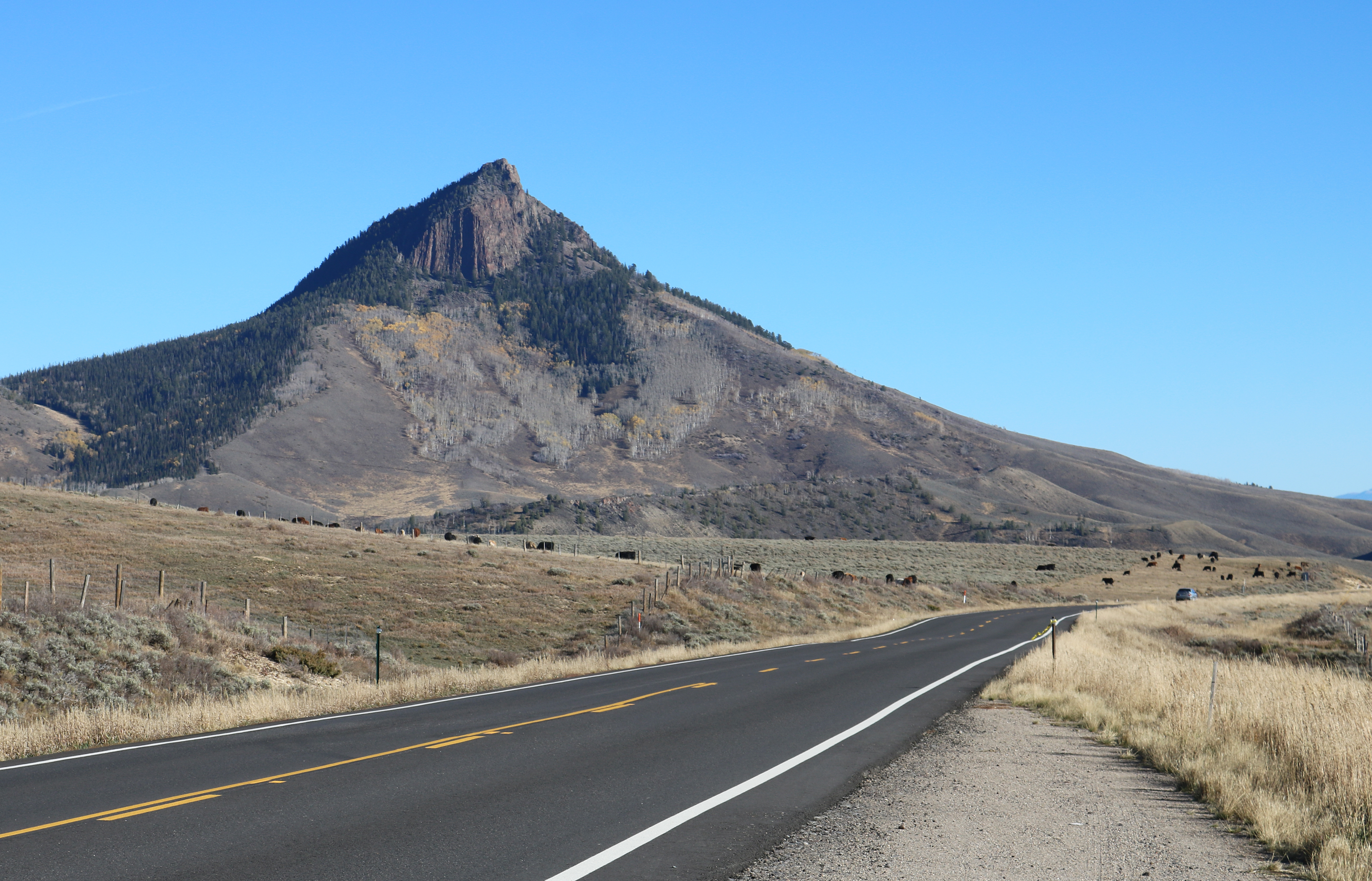
Whiteley Peak along U.S. Highway 40 north of Kremmling

Grand County is a county located in the U.S. state of Colorado. As of the 2020 census, the population was 15,717. The county seat is Hot Sulphur Springs, and the largest community is Granby.

== History ==
When Grand County was created on February 2, 1874, it was carved out of Summit County and contained land to the western and northern borders of the state, which is in present-day Moffat County and Routt County. It was named after Grand Lake and the Grand River, an old name for the upper Colorado River, which has its headwaters in the county. On January 29, 1877, Routt County was created and Grand County shrank down to its current western boundary. When valuable minerals were found in North Park, Grand County claimed the area as part of its county, a claim Larimer County also held. It took a decision by the Colorado Supreme Court in 1886 to declare North Park part of Larimer County, setting Grand County's northern boundary.

In 2004, Marvin John Heemeyer, a local businessman from Granby, used a modified bulldozer to destroy parts of the town of Granby. This was after Heemeyer's lawsuit against the town alleging the government ruined his business was dismissed. His attack ended when one of the bulldozer tracks became inoperable and he committed suicide.

== Geography ==
According to the U.S. Census Bureau, the county has a total area of 1,870 square miles (4,800 km^{2}), of which 1,846 square miles (4,780 km^{2}) is land and 23 square miles (60 km^{2}) (1.2%) is water.

=== Adjacent counties ===
- Larimer County - northeast
- Gilpin County - east
- Boulder County - east
- Clear Creek County - southeast
- Summit County - south
- Eagle County - southwest
- Jackson County - north
- Routt County - west

=== Major highways ===
- U.S. Highway 34
- U.S. Highway 40
- State Highway 9
- State Highway 125
- State Highway 134

=== National protected areas ===
- Arapaho National Forest
- Arapaho National Recreation Area
- Byers Peak Wilderness
- Continental Divide National Scenic Trail
- Indian Peaks Wilderness
- Never Summer Wilderness
- Ptarmigan Peak Wilderness
- Rocky Mountain National Park
- Routt National Forest
- Sarvis Creek Wilderness
- Vasquez Peak Wilderness

=== Bicycle routes ===
- Great Parks Bicycle Route
- TransAmerica Trail Bicycle Route

=== Scenic byways ===
- Colorado River Headwaters National Scenic Byway
- Trail Ridge Road/Beaver Meadow National Scenic Byway

== Demographics ==
Historical population
Census	Pop.	Note	%±
1880	417		—
1890	604		44.8%
1900	741		22.7%
1910	1,862		151.3%
1920	2,659		42.8%
1930	2,108		−20.7%
1940	3,587		70.2%
1950	3,963		10.5%
1960	3,557		−10.2%
1970	4,107		15.5%
1980	7,475		82.0%
1990	7,966		6.6%
2000	12,442		56.2%
2010	14,843		19.3%
2020	15,717		5.9%
2025 (est.)	16,496	▲	5.0%
U.S. Decennial Census; 1790-1960 1900-1990; 1990-2000 2010-2020

=== Racial and ethnic composition ===
Grand County, Colorado – Racial and ethnic composition Note: the US Census treats Hispanic/Latino as an ethnic category. This table excludes Latinos from the racial categories and assigns them to a separate category. Hispanics/Latinos may be of any race.
Race / Ethnicity (NH = Non-Hispanic)	Pop 2000	Pop 2010	Pop 2020	% 2000	% 2010	% 2020
White alone (NH)	11,577	13,313	13,435	93.05%	89.69%	85.48%
Black or African American alone (NH)	60	51	59	0.48%	0.34%	0.38%
Native American or Alaska Native alone (NH)	47	52	56	0.38%	0.35%	0.36%
Asian alone (NH)	82	121	83	0.66%	0.82%	0.53%
Pacific Islander alone (NH)	10	7	17	0.08%	0.05%	0.11%
Other race alone (NH)	15	10	73	0.12%	0.07%	0.46%
Mixed race or Multiracial (NH)	108	173	461	0.87%	1.17%	2.93%
Hispanic or Latino (any race)	543	1,116	1,533	4.36%	7.52%	9.75%
Total	12,442	14,843	15,717	100.00%	100.00%	100.00%

=== 2020 census ===
As of the 2020 census, the county had a population of 15,717. Of the residents, 16.7% were under the age of 18 and 18.3% were 65 years of age or older; the median age was 44.0 years. For every 100 females there were 111.4 males, and for every 100 females age 18 and over there were 112.7 males. 31.7% of residents lived in urban areas and 68.3% lived in rural areas.

The racial makeup of the county was 87.6% White, 0.4% Black or African American, 0.5% American Indian and Alaska Native, 0.6% Asian, 0.1% Native Hawaiian and Pacific Islander, 4.7% from some other race, and 6.1% from two or more races. Hispanic or Latino residents of any race comprised 9.8% of the population.

There were 7,006 households in the county, of which 21.4% had children under the age of 18 living with them and 18.9% had a female householder with no spouse or partner present. About 30.5% of all households were made up of individuals and 10.3% had someone living alone who was 65 years of age or older.

There were 16,633 housing units, of which 57.9% were vacant. Among occupied housing units, 69.5% were owner-occupied and 30.5% were renter-occupied. The homeowner vacancy rate was 1.7% and the rental vacancy rate was 20.1%.

=== 2000 census ===
At the 2000 census, there were 12,442 people in 5,075 households, including 3,217 families, in the county. The population density was 7 people per square mile (2.7 people/km^{2}). There were 10,894 housing units at an average density of 6 units per square mile (2.3 units/km^{2}). The racial makeup of the county was 95.15% White, 0.48% Black or African American, 0.43% Native American, 0.68% Asian, 0.10% Pacific Islander, 2.00% from other races, and 1.15% from two or more races. 4.36% of the population were Hispanic or Latino of any race. 23.8% were of German, 12.6% Irish, 10.0% English and 7.3% American ancestry. Of the 5,075 households 28.10% had children under the age of 18 living with them, 54.70% were married couples living together, 5.20% had a female householder with no husband present, and 36.60% were non-families. 24.80% of households were one person and 4.80% were one person aged 65 or older. The average household size was 2.37 and the average family size was 2.85.

The age distribution was 21.80% under the age of 18, 9.00% from 18 to 24, 34.70% from 25 to 44, 26.80% from 45 to 64, and 7.80% 65 or older. The median age was 37 years. For every 100 females there were 112.70 males. For every 100 females age 18 and over, there were 115.70 males.

The median household income was $47,759 and the median family income was $55,217. Males had a median income of $34,861 versus $26,445 for females. The per capita income for the county was $25,198. About 5.40% of families and 7.30% of the population were below the poverty line, including 7.90% of those under age 18 and 6.10% of those age 65 or over.

== Government ==
Grand County is governed by a Board of County Commissioners consisting of three elected Commissioners serving four-year terms. The Commissioners represent distinct districts of the county, but are elected at-large.

The county also elects a Treasurer, Assessor, Coroner, Clerk and Recorder, Surveyor, and Sheriff to four-year terms as stipulated by the Colorado Constitution.

== Education ==
Grand County is served by two primary school districts. East Grand School District serves much of the county, including the towns of Granby, Hot Sulphur Springs, Fraser, Winter Park and Grand Lake. The district operates four schools:

- Fraser Valley Elementary School (Fraser)
- Granby Elementary School
- East Grand Middle School (Granby)
- Middle Park High School (Granby)

West Grand School District serves the town of Kremmling and the western portions of the county. This district operates two schools, both in Kremmling:

- West Grand Elementary School
- West Grand Junior/Senior High School

== Politics ==
Unlike many counties dominated by a ski town, Grand County leans Republican, having not voted Democratic at the presidential level since Lyndon Johnson won it in 1964. The town of Winter Park, where the Winter Park Ski Resort is located, in the southeast part of the county, is solidly Democratic, while other areas like Granby and Hot Sulphur Springs and most of the rest of the county lean Republican.

The Republican lean has been narrowing in recent elections, with Donald Trump only winning pluralities in 2020 and 2024. In the latter, the county shifted leftward from 2020, and Kamala Harris lost by only 79 votes, the closest she came to flipping any county in the election.

Democratic Governor Jared Polis won the county in the 2022 Colorado gubernatorial election, as did Michael Bennet in the concurrent Senate race.

United States presidential election results for Grand County, Colorado
Year	Republican		Democratic		Third party(ies)	
Year	No.	%	No.	%	No.	%
1880	121	57.08%	87	41.04%	4	1.89%
1884	249	58.18%	174	40.65%	5	1.17%
1888	162	64.80%	83	33.20%	5	2.00%
1892	104	43.70%	0	0.00%	134	56.30%
1896	12	4.53%	251	94.72%	2	0.75%
1900	171	48.17%	182	51.27%	2	0.56%
1904	475	63.16%	266	35.37%	11	1.46%
1908	529	51.31%	487	47.24%	15	1.45%
1912	248	25.78%	507	52.70%	207	21.52%
1916	378	37.17%	624	61.36%	15	1.47%
1920	649	52.51%	553	44.74%	34	2.75%
1924	681	54.31%	308	24.56%	265	21.13%
1928	770	62.15%	451	36.40%	18	1.45%
1932	598	42.87%	771	55.27%	26	1.86%
1936	714	45.54%	846	53.95%	8	0.51%
1940	1,074	55.19%	863	44.35%	9	0.46%
1944	968	63.52%	554	36.35%	2	0.13%
1948	777	49.74%	763	48.85%	22	1.41%
1952	1,333	70.34%	554	29.23%	8	0.42%
1956	1,239	71.33%	496	28.55%	2	0.12%
1960	1,104	62.62%	657	37.27%	2	0.11%
1964	814	47.22%	902	52.32%	8	0.46%
1968	1,167	67.38%	433	25.00%	132	7.62%
1972	1,721	69.93%	685	27.83%	55	2.23%
1976	1,703	61.77%	910	33.01%	144	5.22%
1980	2,133	61.28%	820	23.56%	528	15.17%
1984	2,865	72.72%	1,017	25.81%	58	1.47%
1988	2,306	60.08%	1,451	37.81%	81	2.11%
1992	1,763	35.85%	1,678	34.12%	1,477	30.03%
1996	2,264	46.30%	2,012	41.15%	614	12.56%
2000	3,570	56.19%	2,308	36.33%	475	7.48%
2004	4,260	55.99%	3,243	42.62%	106	1.39%
2008	4,128	49.68%	4,037	48.59%	144	1.73%
2012	4,253	51.95%	3,684	45.00%	250	3.05%
2016	4,494	52.33%	3,358	39.10%	736	8.57%
2020	4,883	49.47%	4,710	47.72%	277	2.81%
2024	4,822	48.79%	4,743	47.99%	319	3.23%

United States Senate election results for Grand County, Colorado2
Year	Republican		Democratic		Third party(ies)	
Year	No.	%	No.	%	No.	%
2020	5,075	51.38%	4,579	46.36%	224	2.27%

United States Senate election results for Grand County, Colorado3
Year	Republican		Democratic		Third party(ies)	
Year	No.	%	No.	%	No.	%
2022	3,824	47.89%	3,912	48.99%	249	3.12%

Colorado Gubernatorial election results for Grand County
Year	Republican		Democratic		Third party(ies)	
Year	No.	%	No.	%	No.	%
2022	3,649	45.58%	4,162	51.99%	195	2.44%

== Communities ==
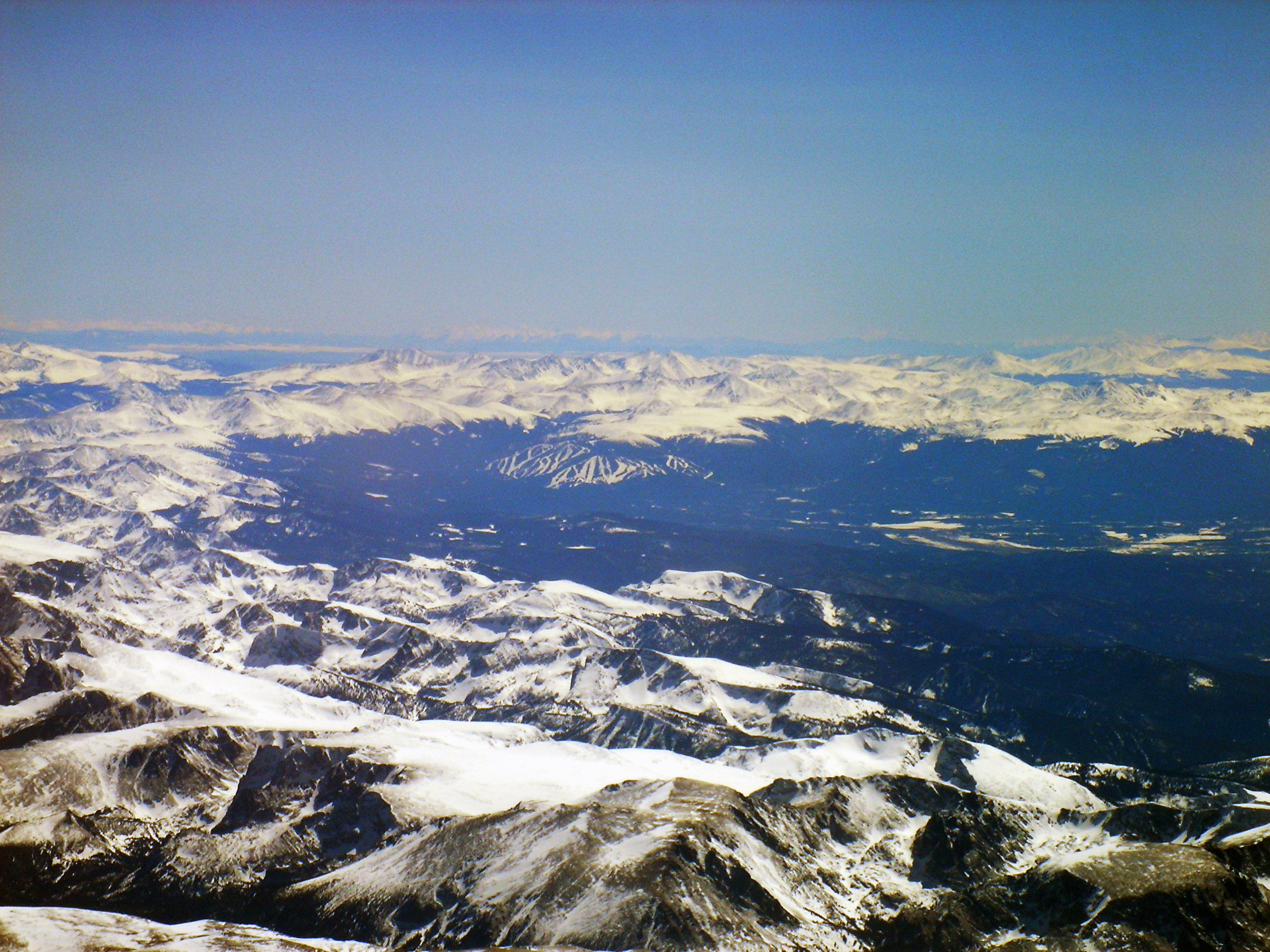
The Fraser Valley in eastern Grand County is a key tourist area.

=== Towns ===
- Fraser
- Granby
- Grand Lake
- Hot Sulphur Springs
- Kremmling
- Winter Park

=== Census-designated places ===
- Parshall
- Tabernash

=== Other ===
- Radium

== See also ==
- Bibliography of Colorado
- Geography of Colorado
- History of Colorado
  - Saratoga County, Jefferson Territory
  - National Register of Historic Places listings in Grand County, Colorado
- Index of Colorado-related articles
- List of Colorado-related lists
  - List of counties in Colorado
- Outline of Colorado
