= U.S. Route 40 in Colorado =

Section of U.S. Highway in Colorado, United States

U.S. Highway 40
- US 40 highlighted in red

Route information
- Maintained by CDOT
- Length: 496.442 mi (798.946 km)
- Existed: 1926–present
- Tourist routes: Victory Highway

Major junctions
- West end: US 40 at the Utah state line in Dinosaur
- US 34 near Granby; I-70 / US 6 at Empire; SH 470 in Golden; US 287 from Denver to Kit Carson; I-25 / US 85 / US 87 in Denver; I-225 in Aurora; US 36 near Aurora; E-470 near Aurora; I-70 from Watkins to Limon; US 385 at Cheyenne Wells
- East end: US-40 at the Kansas state line near Arapahoe

Location
- Country: United States
- State: Colorado
- Counties: Moffat, Routt, Jackson, Grand, Clear Creek, Jefferson, Denver, Adams, Arapahoe, Elbert, Lincoln, Cheyenne

Highway system
- United States Numbered Highway System; List; Special; Divided; Colorado State Highway System; Interstate; US; State; Scenic
← SH 39	→ SH 41

U.S. Route 40 (US 40) is a part of the U.S. Highway System that travels from Silver Summit, Utah, to Byers, Colorado. In the U.S. state of Colorado, US 40 is a major east–west route. It crosses the Rocky Mountains, passing over the Continental Divide at Berthoud Pass before descending to the Front Range. It then traverses through the Denver Metro Area, then exits by following Interstate 70 (I-70) and US 287. It is concurrent with US 287 for about 145 miles to Kit Carson. US 40 exits into Kansas east of Arapahoe in Cheyenne. At a length of almost 500 miles, US 40 is the longest numbered route in the state.

== Route description ==
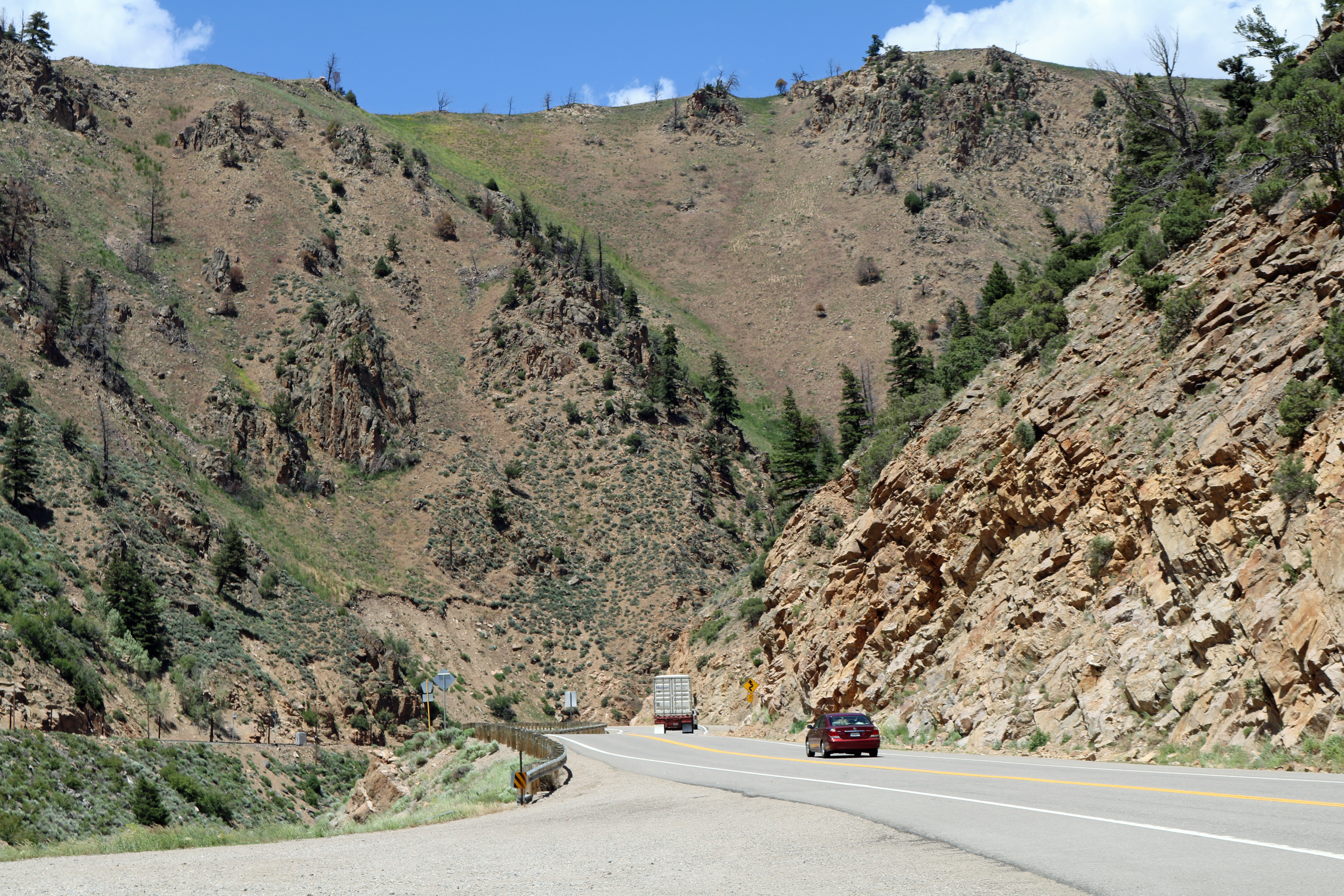
US 40 in Byers Canyon between Parshall and Hot Sulphur Springs. The Union Pacific railroad line is visible on the left. The Colorado River is at the bottom of the canyon and is not visible.

Entering Colorado to the south of Dinosaur National Monument, US 40 runs east through the small town of Dinosaur along Brontosaurus Boulevard. The route continues a generally easterly course though Moffat and Routt counties, passing through several small communities along the way. It generally follows the course of the Yampa River. US 40 becomes Lincoln Avenue as it runs through historic downtown Steamboat Springs, Colorado.

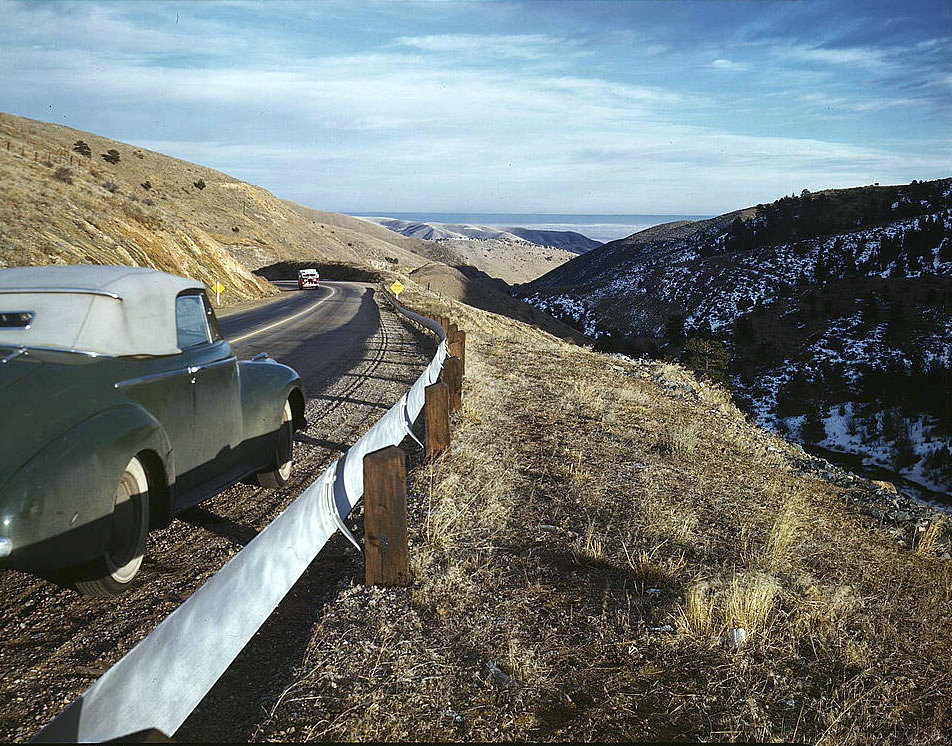
View along US 40 in Mount Vernon Canyon, Colorado, 1942. Photo by Andreas Feininger.

Taking a circuitous route through Rabbit Ears Pass, Muddy Pass and Berthoud Pass (crossing the Continental Divide each time) it descends the escarpment along the eastern edge of the Rocky Mountains. Just to the east of Empire, it merges with I-70 for the first time. US 40 and I-70 will run concurrently numerous times across the U.S. The route leaves I-70 at exit 244, to the east of Idaho Springs and rejoins it again at between exits 252 and 254 in El Rancho. It parallels I-70, mostly as a frontage road, until the intersection with former State Highway 26 (SH 26) to the south of Golden

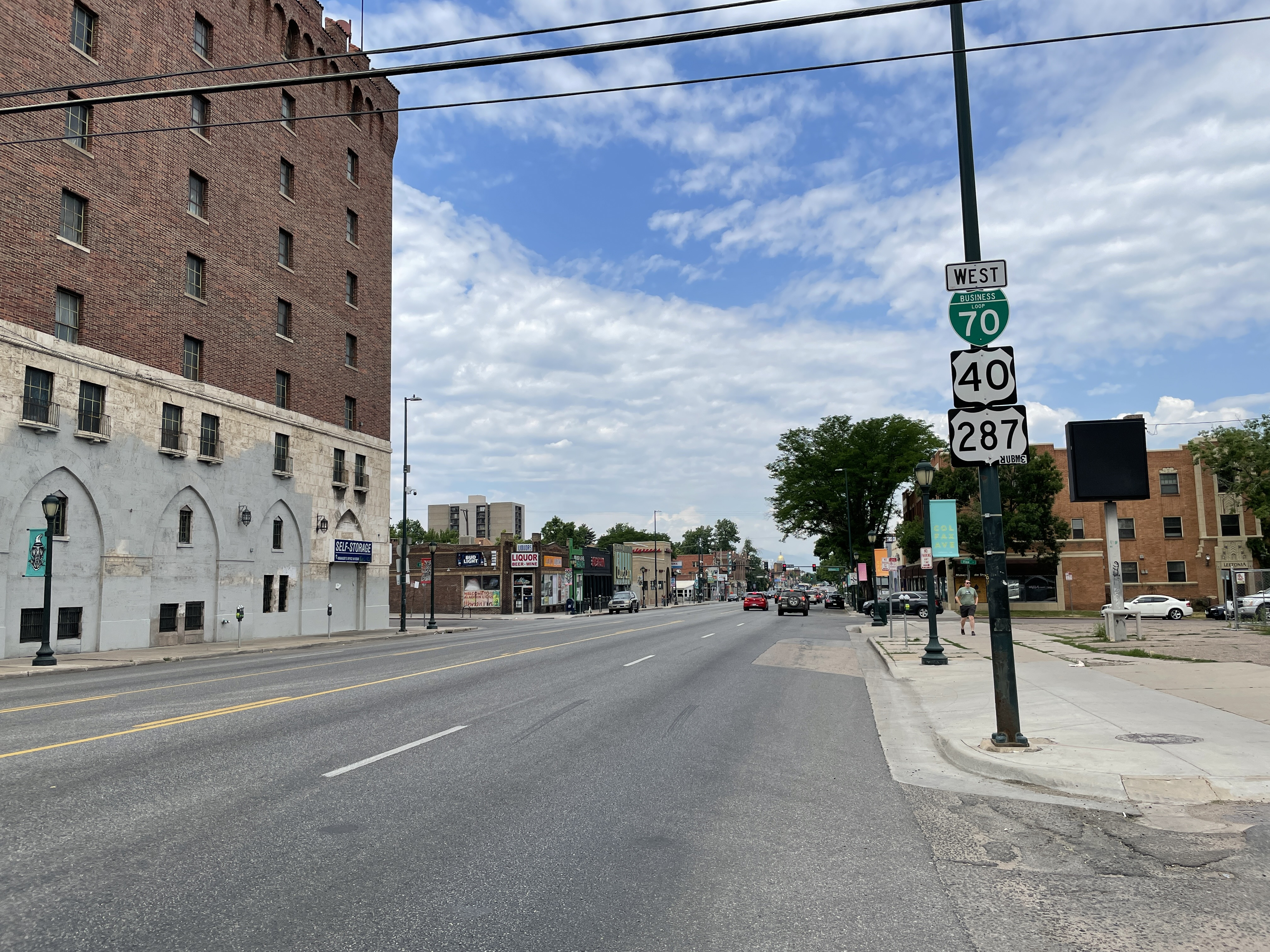
US 40 westbound concurrent with I-70 BL and US 287 on Colfax Avenue in Denver

Beginning in Golden, US 40 becomes Colfax Avenue, the main east–west thoroughfare through the Denver-Aurora Metropolitan Area. Along with US 40, the entire route along Colfax Avenue is cosigned as Business Loop 70. The route travels northeast through Golden, then turns due east to travel through Lakewood, Denver, and Aurora. Among the sights to be seen along US 40 is Lake Steam Bath, once the location of a thriving health industry centered on tuberculosis sanatoriums. Also along Colfax Avenue in Denver is the Denver branch of the United States Mint, which produces 50 million coins per day. US 40 rejoins I-70 at exit 288, just to the east of Aurora.

At exit 359 in Limon, US 40 leaves I-70 along Main Street, which it shares with Business Loop 70, US 24, US 287, and SH 71. US 40/US 287 continues to the southeast to the town of Kit Carson. From there, it leaves US 287 and continues east through the towns of Cheyenne Wells and Arapahoe before entering the state of Kansas.

== Major intersections ==
County	Location	mi	km	Destinations	Notes
Moffat		0.000	0.000	US 40 west – Vernal, Salt Lake City	Continuation into Utah
Moffat	Dinosaur	2.913	4.688	SH 64 east (Stegosaurus Freeway) – Rangely	Western terminus of SH 64
Moffat	Blue Mountain	11.018	17.732	CR 134 – Rangely	Former SH 387
Moffat	Maybell	59.781	96.208	SH 318 west – Sunbeam	Eastern terminus of SH 318
Moffat	Craig	89.322	143.750	SH 13 south / CR 7 – Meeker	West end of SH 13 overlap; former SH 355 north
Moffat	Craig	90.531	145.696	SH 394 south (Ranney Street)	Northern terminus of SH 394; former SH 13 south
Moffat	Craig	90.838	146.190	SH 13 north (Yampa Avenue) – Baggs, Rawlins	East end of SH 13 overlap
Routt	Steamboat Springs	130.773	210.459	CR 129 (Elk River Road) – Clark, Hahns Peak, Steamboat Lake State Park, Pearl Lake State Park	Former SH 129
Routt	Steamboat Springs	134.414	216.318	Mt. Werner Road	Interchange
Routt		136.515	219.700	SH 131 south – Oak Creek, Wolcott, Stagecoach Reservoir State Park	Northern terminus of SH 131
Grand	No major junctions				
		154.070	247.952	Rabbit Ears Pass summit (Continental Divide)	
Jackson		157.327	253.193	SH 14 east – Walden	Western terminus of SH 14
		157.512	253.491	Muddy Pass summit (Continental Divide)	
Grand		178.257	286.877	SH 134 west – Toponas, Stagecoach Reservoir State Park	Eastern terminus of SH 134
Grand	Kremmling	184.529	296.971	SH 9 south (6th Street) – Dillon	Northern terminus of SH 9
Grand	Parshall	197.320	317.556	CR 3 (Ute Pass Road)	Alternate route to SH 9 from US 40
Grand		209.165	336.618	SH 125 north – Walden	Southern terminus of SH 125
Grand	Granby	211.081	339.702	US 34 east – Grand Lake, Estes Park, Rocky Mountain National Park, Arapaho National Forest	Western terminus of US 34
Grand	Granby	220.0	354.1	CR 5 (4 Bar 4 Road)	Northern US 40 intersection of CR 5 alt route to US 40, bypassing Tabernash, Colorado.
Grand	Fraser	226.2	364.0	CR 5 (4 Bar 4 Road)	Southeastern US 40 intersection of CR 5 alt route to US 40, bypassing Tabernash, Colorado.
Grand	Fraser	227.1	365.5	CR 72 (Tubing Hill Road) / CR 804 (Meadow Ridge Road)	
		242.972	391.026	Berthoud Pass summit (Continental Divide)	
Clear Creek		257.684 232.333	414.702 373.904	I-70 west (US 6 west) – Georgetown	West end of I-70/US 6 overlap
Clear Creek		232.333– 244.260	373.904– 393.098	See I-70	
Clear Creek		244.260 257.146	393.098 413.836	I-70 east – Denver	East end of I-70 overlap; no access from US 40 west to I-70 east
Clear Creek		257.751 269.441	414.810 433.623	US 6 east to SH 119 – Blackhawk, Central City, Golden	East end of US 6 overlap
Clear Creek		271.489	436.919	To I-70 west / Beaver Brook Drive – Floyd Hill	
Jefferson		272.552	438.630	CR 65 south to I-70 east	
Jefferson		276.180	444.469	I-70 west	
Jefferson		276.920 0.374	445.660 0.602	SH 74 east (Evergreen Parkway) – Evergreen	Western terminus of SH 74
Jefferson		0.194 251.318	0.312 404.457	I-70 west	West end of I-70 overlap; westbound exit and eastbound entrance
Jefferson		252.244	405.947	Chief Hosa	I-70 exit 253
Jefferson		253.528 279.244	408.014 449.400	I-70 east	East end of I-70 overlap
Jefferson		280.570	451.534	Lookout Mountain Road - Buffalo Bill's Grave & Museum, Lookout Mountain Nature Center, Boettcher Mansion	Former SH 68
Jefferson		281.977	453.798	To I-70 / Grapevine Road	
Jefferson	Golden	284.888	458.483	I-70 BL west / CR 93 south to I-70	West end of I-70 Bus. overlap; former SH 26 (older SH 93 south)
Jefferson	Golden	285.716	459.815	CR 93 north (Heritage Road)	Former SH 93 north
Jefferson	Golden	286.871	461.674	US 6 (6th Avenue) to SH 470 – Golden, Central City	
Jefferson		287.903	463.335	I-70	
Jefferson	Lakewood	291.444	469.034	SH 391 (Kipling Street)	
Jefferson	Lakewood	292.943	471.446	SH 121 (Wadsworth Boulevard)	
Jefferson	Lakewood	294.273	473.586	SH 95 (Sheridan Boulevard)	
City and County of Denver		296.157	476.618	US 287 north / SH 88 south (Federal Boulevard)	West end of US 287 overlap; northern terminus of SH 88; interchange
City and County of Denver		296.792	477.640	I-25 (US 6 / US 85 / US 87) / Auraria Parkway – Colorado Springs, Fort Collins	
City and County of Denver		300.625	483.809	SH 2 (Colorado Boulevard)	
Adams–Arapahoe county line	Aurora	306.341	493.008	I-225 to I-70	
Adams–Arapahoe county line	Aurora	312.142 288.219	502.344 463.844	I-70 (US 36 west) – Denver	West end of I-70 / US 36 overlap; east end of I-70 Bus. overlap; no access from US 40 east to I-70 west
See I-70 for exits
Lincoln	Limon	359.499 0.498	578.558 0.801	I-70 east	West end of I-70 Bus. overlap; east end of I-70 overlap
Lincoln	Limon	0.000 376.714	0.000 606.262	US 24 west – Colorado Springs	West end of US 24 overlap
Lincoln	Limon	377.668	607.798	SH 71 south	West end of SH 71 overlap
Lincoln	Limon	378.795	609.611	SH 71 north (1st Avenue) – Brush	East end of SH 71 overlap
Lincoln	Limon	379.193	610.252	I-70	
Lincoln		380.464 386.010	612.297 621.223	I-70 (US 24 east)	East end of I-70 Bus./US 24 overlap
Lincoln		397.833	640.250	CR 109 – Genoa	Former SH 109 north
Lincoln	Hugo	399.092	642.276	Third Avenue	Former SH 109 south
Cheyenne	Aroya	425.472	684.731	SH 94 west – Colorado Springs	Eastern terminus of SH 94
Cheyenne	Kit Carson	445.142	716.387	SH 59 north – Seibert	Southern terminus of SH 59
Cheyenne		446.051	717.850	US 287 south – Eads	East end of US 287 overlap
Cheyenne	Cheyenne Wells	470.311	756.892	US 385 north (5th Street) – Burlington	West end of US 385 overlap
Cheyenne		470.885	757.816	US 385 south – Sheridan Lake	East end of US 385 overlap
Cheyenne		486.924	783.628	US-40 east – Sharon Springs	Continuation into Kansas
1.000 mi = 1.609 km; 1.000 km = 0.621 mi: Concurrency terminus

== State Highway 40 ==
State Highway 40
- Location: Byers–Agate
- Length: 24.1 mi (38.8 km)

State Highway 40 (SH 40) represents the former two-lane alignment of US 40 in Arapahoe and Elbert Counties, prior to its demotion by the then-Colorado Department of Highways when they moved the route to then new I-70 in 1968.

SH 40 begins in Arapahoe County the town of Byers at a junction with SH 36 (N Main Street/Old Highway 36), just across the railroad tracks from downtown. It heads southeast to leave Byers and travel along the flat plains of eastern Colorado for the next several miles. The highway passes through the tiny community of Peoria, where there is an interchange with I-70/US 40/US 287 (exit 322), before passing by the Richmil Ranch Open Space park.

SH 40 then enters the town of Deer Trail, passing along the western edge of town as 1st Avenue as it has an intersection with I-70 BS (Cedar Street). It continues southeastward across the plains to leave Deer Trail and crosses into Elbert County. The highway passes through the tiny community of Lowland, where it has another interchange with I-70/US 40/US 287 (exit 336), before crossing a creek to enter the small town of Agate along 1st Avenue, with SH 40 coming to an end shortly thereafter at a junction with Main Street. Main Street (as unsigned I-70 BS) leads 0.3 miles (0.48 km) west to an interchange with I-70/US 40/US 287 (exit 340).

The entire length of SH 40 is a rural, two-lane, state highway, running parallel to both the eastbound lanes of modern I-70 to its north, as well as a railroad track to its south. SH 40 never goes beyond a half mile from the Interstate.

County	Location	mi	km	Destinations	Notes
Arapahoe	Byers	0.0	0.0	SH 36 (Main Street/Old Highway 36) to I-70 (US 40/US 287) / US 36 – Strasburg	Western terminus; former US 40 follows SH 36 west
Arapahoe	Peoria	6.1	9.8	Peoria Road to I-70 (US 40/US 287)	I-70 exit 322
Arapahoe	Deer Trail	12.3	19.8	I-70 BS (Cedar Street) to I-70 (US 40/US 287)	
Elbert	Lowland	20.6	33.2	CR 178 to I-70 (US 40/US 287)	I-70 exit 336
Elbert	Agate	24.1	38.8	Main Street to I-70 (US 40/US 287); 1st Avenue	Eastern terminus; former US 40 continues east along 1st Avenue
1.000 mi = 1.609 km; 1.000 km = 0.621 mi

== See also ==
- Victory Highway

U.S. Route 40
Previous state: Utah	Colorado	Next state: Kansas
