= Business routes of Interstate 70 in Colorado =

Interstate 70 Business

Location
- Country: United States
- State: Colorado

Highway system
- Interstate Highway System; Main; Auxiliary; Suffixed; Business; Future; Colorado State Highway System; Interstate; US; State; Scenic
← I-70	→ SH 71

There are 13 active business routes of Interstate 70 in Colorado. Interstate 70 (I-70) spans Colorado in an east–west fashion, holding many business loops and spurs along the way, varying from lengths of 0.22 miles (0.35 km) to 27.47 miles (44.21 km), with a total of 55.51 miles (89.33 km). Four other business routes also used to exist within the state.

== Grand Junction–Clifton business loop ==
Interstate 70 Business
- Location: Grand Junction–Clifton
- Length: 13.27 mi (21.36 km)

Interstate 70 Business (I-70 Bus.) is a business loop that runs through Grand Junction and Clifton. This route is mostly an expressway, with the exception of downtown Grand Junction, where the route is divided into two one-way streets (Pitkin and Ute avenues) and then turns north onto a four-lane surface street (1st Street). The route is partially signed with U.S. Highway 6 (US 6) and US 50 (separate and together). The route is one of the most important routes in the Grand Junction area.

Major intersections
The entire route is in Mesa County.

Location	mi	km	Destinations	Notes
Grand Junction	0.00	0.00	I-70 / US 6 west / US 50 west – Utah, Denver	Western terminus; road continues west as US 6 / US 50
Grand Junction	4.36	7.02	US 6 east (North Avenue)	Eastern terminus of concurrency with US 6
Grand Junction	4.95	7.97	SH 340 west (Broadway Road) – Colorado National Monument	Eastern terminus of SH 340
Grand Junction	5.66	9.11	US 50 east (5th Street) – Delta, Montrose	Eastern terminus of concurrency with US 50
Grand Junction	9.30	14.97	US 6 west (North Avenue)	Western terminus of concurrency with US 6
Clifton	11.71	18.85	SH 141 south (32nd Road) to US 50 – Delta, Montrose	Northern terminus of SH 141
Clifton	13.27	21.36	I-70 / US 6 – Green River, Denver	Eastern terminus; ends concurrency with US 6
1.000 mi = 1.609 km; 1.000 km = 0.621 mi: Concurrency terminus

== Palisade business loop ==
Interstate 70 Business
- Location: Palisade
- Length: 3.7 mi (6.0 km)

Interstate 70 Business (I-70 Bus.) served Palisade from I-70. It started at exit 42 from the Interstate as Elberta Avenue. It then turned east onto 8th Avenue and continued east as G road, which was once US 6. The route looped around the Colorado River east of town and terminated at I-70 at exit 44. The route is retired.

Major intersections
The entire route is in Mesa County.

Location	mi	km	Destinations	Notes
Palisade	0.000	0.000	I-70 / US 6 west	Western terminus
	3.7	6.0	I-70 / US 6 east	Eastern terminus
1.000 mi = 1.609 km; 1.000 km = 0.621 mi

== Rifle business loop ==
Interstate 70 Business
- Location: Rifle
- Length: 4 mi (6.4 km)

Interstate 70 Business (I-70 Bus.) was a four-mile (6.4 km) route that served Rifle and overlapped US 6 from exit 87 on I-70 to State Highway 13 (SH 13, Railroad Avenue). It turned south and crossed the Colorado River before terminating at exit 90. It was unsigned and later decommissioned in 2004.

Major intersections
The entire route is in Garfield County.

Location	mi	km	Destinations	Notes
Rifle	0.000	0.000	I-70 / US 6 west	Western terminus; begins concurrency with US 6.
	2.7	4.3	SH 13 north (Will Ave.) – Meeker, Craig	Begins concurrency with SH 13
	3.5	5.6	US 6 east / Railroad Ave.	Eastern terminus of concurrency with US 6
	4.0	6.4	I-70 / SH 13 – Denver, Grand Junction	Eastern terminus; southern terminus of SH 13
1.000 mi = 1.609 km; 1.000 km = 0.621 mi: Concurrency terminus

== Silt business spur ==
Interstate 70 Business
- Location: Silt
- Length: 0.22 mi (350 m)

Interstate 70 Business (I-70 Bus.) serves Silt and runs from I-70 to US 6. The road begins on the south side of I-70. The intersection between I-70 Bus. and I-70 forms a diamond interchange. The 0.22-mile (0.35 km) route is currently unsigned and runs along 9th Street before terminating at a roundabout at US 6.

Major intersections
The entire route is in Garfield County.

Location	mi	km	Destinations	Notes
Silt	0.000	0.000	I-70 – Denver, Grand Junction	Southern terminus
	0.22	0.35	US 6 (Main St.) / 9th St.	Northern terminus
1.000 mi = 1.609 km; 1.000 km = 0.621 mi

== Eagle business spur ==
Interstate 70 Business
- Location: Eagle
- Length: 0.35 mi (560 m)

Interstate 70 Business (I-70 Bus.) serves Eagle and runs from US 6 to I-70. The road begins with a roundabout at the intersection of I-70 Bus. and US 6. On the other side of the roundabout, the road continues as Church Street. Along I-70 Bus., the road is known as Eby Creek Road. The route then heads northward over the Colorado River in the northern city limits of Eagle, intersecting Chambers Avenue and Loren Road before meeting its northern terminus with I-70. The intersection forms a dumbbell interchange, and Eby Creek Road continues north. The route is currently unsigned.

Major intersections
The entire route is in Eagle County.

Location	mi	km	Destinations	Notes
Eagle	0.000	0.000	I-70 (Eby Creek Rd.)	Northern terminus
	0.35	0.56	US 6 (Grand Ave.)	Southern terminus
1.000 mi = 1.609 km; 1.000 km = 0.621 mi

== Edwards business spur ==
Interstate 70 Business
- Location: Edwards
- Length: 0.58 mi (930 m)

Interstate 70 Business (I-70 Bus.) is a spur serving Edwards that runs from I-70 to US 6. The road runs south from exit 163 on I-70 with roundabouts on both sides of the interchange followed by a third roundabout at Miller Ranch Road. I-70 Bus. makes a slight southwest turn as it runs along a bridge over a railroad line, then turns back to the south before crossing another bridge over the Eagle River. I-70 Bus. ends at US 6, and Edwards Access Road becomes Edwards Village Road as it curves to the west. The route is unsigned.

Major intersections
The entire route is in Eagle County.

Location	mi	km	Destinations	Notes
Edwards	0.000	0.000	I-70 (Edwards Access Rd.)	Northern terminus
	0.58	0.93	US 6 (Edwards Village Blvd.)	Southern terminus
1.000 mi = 1.609 km; 1.000 km = 0.621 mi

== Avon business spur ==
Interstate 70 Business
- Location: Avon
- Length: 0.43 mi (690 m)

Interstate 70 Business (I-70 Bus.) served Avon from I-70. It started at the dogbone interchange at exit 167 from the Interstate and went south along Avon Road. It passed through two raindrop roundabouts at the interchange and two more roundabouts through town. The route terminated at another roundabout at US 6. It was decommissioned in 1999.

Major intersections
The entire route is in Eagle County.

Location	mi	km	Destinations	Notes
Avon	0.000	0.000	I-70 (Avon Rd.) – Denver, Grand Junction	Northern terminus
	0.43	0.69	US 6 (Village Rd.) – Eagle-Vail, Arrowhead	Southern terminus
1.000 mi = 1.609 km; 1.000 km = 0.621 mi

== Frisco business loop ==
Interstate 70 Business
- Location: Frisco
- Length: 2.3 mi (3.7 km)

Interstate 70 Business (I-70 Bus.) served Frisco from I-70. It was signed along Main Street from the exit 201 diamond interchange and passed through downtown. It turned to the north on SH 9, known locally as Summit Boulevard, and terminated at a roundabout at the diamond interchange at exit 203 on I-70. The route is retired.

Major intersections
The entire route is in Summit County.

Location	mi	km	Destinations	Notes
Frisco	0.000	0.000	I-70 (Main St.) / US 6	Western terminus
	1.18	1.90	SH 9 (Summit Blvd.)	Begins concurrency with SH 9.
	2.3	3.7	I-70 / US 6 / SH 9 (Summit Blvd.)	Northern terminus; ends concurrency with SH 9.
1.000 mi = 1.609 km; 1.000 km = 0.621 mi: Concurrency terminus

== Idaho Springs business loop ==
Interstate 70 Business
- Location: Idaho Springs
- Length: 2.71 mi (4.36 km)

Interstate 70 Business (I-70 Bus.) is a loop serving Idaho Springs from I-70. The route starts at a partial Y interchange at exit 239. The route parallels I-70 to the north through downtown along Colorado Boulevard. It passes through a roundabout and up and over the Interstate on an overpass before terminating at exit 241. The east end of I-70 Bus. was rebuilt in 2015 from a tight parclo interchange.

Major intersections
The entire route is in Clear Creek County.

Location	mi	km	Destinations	Notes
	0.000	0.000	I-70 west / US 6 west / US 40 west (Colorado Blvd.) – Grand Junction	Western terminus
Idaho Springs	2.71	4.36	I-70 / US 6 / US 40 (Colorado Blvd.) – Denver	Eastern terminus
1.000 mi = 1.609 km; 1.000 km = 0.621 mi

== Denver metropolitan area business loop ==
Interstate 70 Business
- Location: West Pleasant View–Aurora
- Length: 23.7 mi (38.1 km)

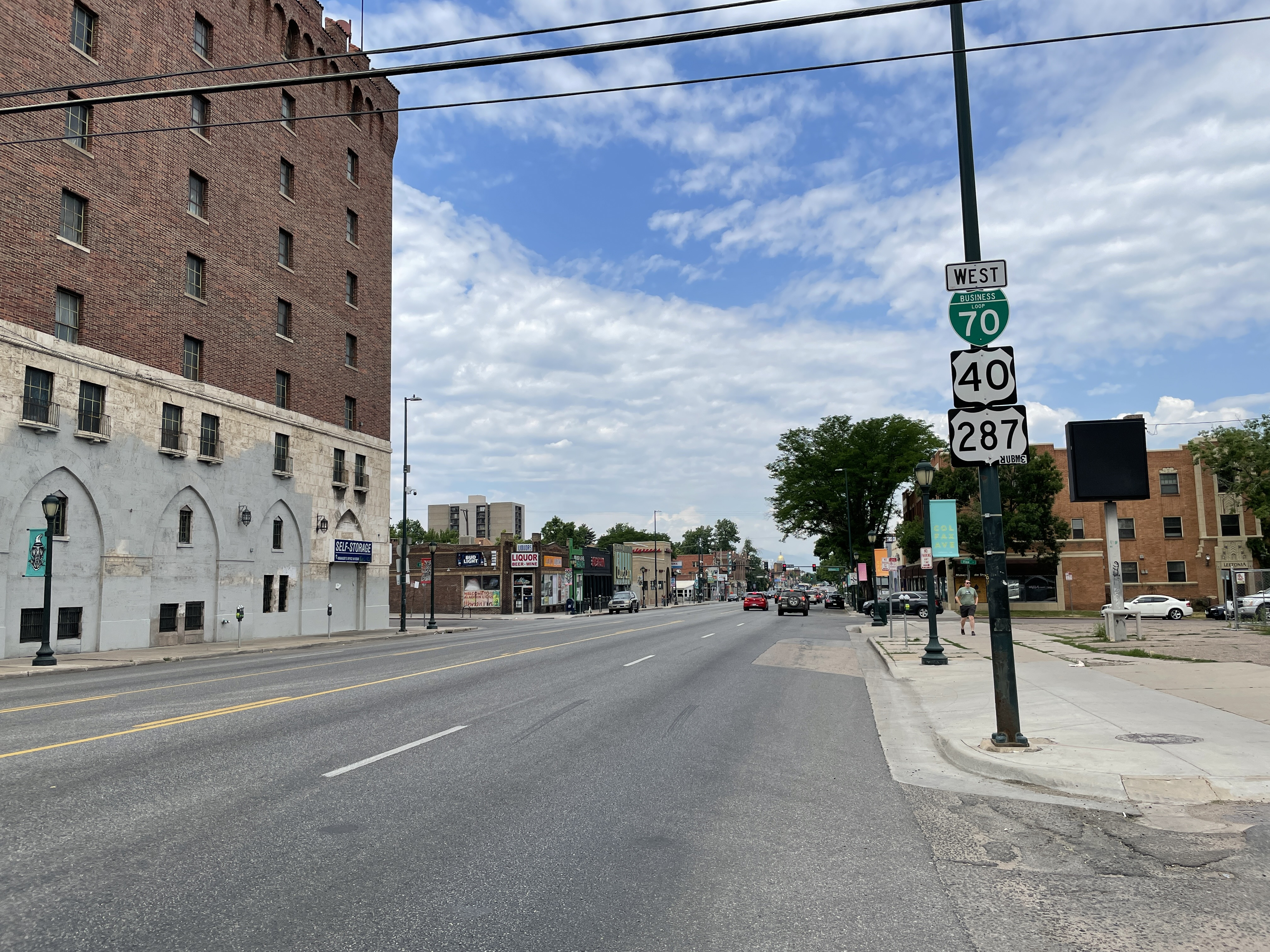
I-70 BL westbound concurrent with US 40 and US 287 on Colfax Avenue in Denver

Interstate 70 Business (I-70 Bus.) is a 23.7-mile-long (38.1 km) route between West Pleasant View and Aurora, as well as traveling through Downtown Denver, all within the Denver metropolitan area. Known locally as Colfax Avenue, the route connects with I-70 at both ends. This route is one of the longest business routes in the country. It starts at a partial Y interchange at exit 288 on I-70 east of Aurora. It is concurrent with US 40 the entire way and is also concurrent with US 287 from I-70 east of Aurora to the partial cloverleaf interchange at Federal Boulevard in Denver, where US 287 goes north. It interchanges with I-225 and I-25 in the metro area. The route ends at exit 262 on I-70 at a diamond interchange in West Pleasant View while US 40/Colfax Avenue continues toward the mountains.

Major intersections

County	Location	mi	km	Destinations	Notes
Jefferson	West Pleasant View	0.00	0.00	I-70 / US 40 west (Colfax Avenue)	Western end of US 40 concurrency; western terminus; US 40 continues west; I-70 exit 262.
Jefferson	Lakewood	3.40	5.47	SH 391 (Kipling Street)	
Jefferson	Lakewood	4.90	7.89	SH 121 (Wadsworth Boulevard)	
Jefferson	Lakewood	6.40	10.30	SH 95 (Sheridan Boulevard)	
City and County of Denver		7.90	12.71	US 287 / SH 88 south (Federal Boulevard)	Western end of US 287 concurrency; northern terminus of SH 88; interchange
City and County of Denver		8.50	13.68	I-25 / US 6 / US 85 / US 87 – Fort Collins, Colorado Springs	I-25 exit 210A
City and County of Denver		12.40	19.96	SH 2 (Colorado Boulevard)	
Arapahoe	Aurora	18.60	29.93	I-225	I-225 exit 10
Arapahoe	Aurora	23.70	38.14	I-70 / US 36 east / US 40 / US 287 north	Eastern end of US 40 and US 287 concurrencies; eastern terminus; no access from I-70 Bus. east to I-70 west
1.000 mi = 1.609 km; 1.000 km = 0.621 mi: Concurrency terminus

== Watkins business spur ==
Interstate 70 Business
- Location: Watkins
- Length: 0.40 mi (640 m)

Interstate 70 Business (I-70 Bus.) serves Watkins and runs from I-70 to SH 36. It starts at a diamond interchange at exit 295 at I-70 as Watkins Road as it enters town. The route terminates at SH 36 (Colfax Avenue). The route is only signed at exit 295 along I-70 and is referred to as a business loop instead of a spur.

Major intersections

County	Location	mi	km	Destinations	Notes
Arapahoe	Watkins	0.000	0.000	I-70 / US 36 / US 40 / US 287 (Watkins Rd.)	Southern terminus
Adams		0.4	0.64	SH 36 (Colfax Ave.)	Northern terminus
1.000 mi = 1.609 km; 1.000 km = 0.621 mi

== Strasburg business spur ==
Interstate 70 Business
- Location: Strasburg
- Length: 0.35 mi (560 m)

Interstate 70 Business (I-70 Bus.) serves Strasburg and runs from I-70 to SH 36. The route starts at I-70 at exit 310 at a diamond interchange as Arrowhead Street. It becomes Wagner Street at the overpass entering Strasburg. The route terminates at SH 36 (15th avenue) and is unsigned.

Major intersections

County	Location	mi	km	Destinations	Notes
Arapahoe	Strasburg	0.000	0.000	I-70 / US 36 / US 40 / US 287 (Wagner St.)	Southern terminus
Adams		0.35	0.56	SH 36 (15th Ave./Colfax Ave.)	Northern terminus
1.000 mi = 1.609 km; 1.000 km = 0.621 mi

== Deer Trail business spur ==
Interstate 70 Business
- Location: Deer Trail
- Length: 0.40 mi (640 m)

Interstate 70 Business (I-70 Bus.) serves Deer Trail and runs from US 40 to I-70. It starts at a diamond interchange at I-70 at exit 328 and runs along Cedar Street through downtown before terminating at SH 40 (1st Avenue). The route is unsigned.

Major intersections
The entire route is in Arapahoe County.

Location	mi	km	Destinations	Notes
Deer Trail	0.000	0.000	SH 40 (1st Ave.)	Western Terminus
	0.4	0.64	I-70 / US 40 (Cedar St.) / US 287	Eastern terminus
1.000 mi = 1.609 km; 1.000 km = 0.621 mi

== Agate business spur ==
Interstate 70 Business
- Location: Agate
- Length: 0.35 mi (560 m)

Interstate 70 Business (I-70 Bus.) serves Agate and runs from US 40 to I-70. It starts at a diamond interchange at exit 340 and County Road 166 and runs as an unnamed road entering Agate. The route becomes Main Street as it intersects 2nd Avenue. It terminates at the intersection of 1st Avenue and Main Street. The route is unsigned.

Major intersections
The entire route is in Elbert County.

Location	mi	km	Destinations	Notes
Agate	0.000	0.000	County Rd. 153 / Main St.	Western terminus; road loops south and continues as County Rd. 153.
	0.35	0.56	I-70 / US 40 / US 287	Eastern terminus; road continues as County Rd. 166.
1.000 mi = 1.609 km; 1.000 km = 0.621 mi

== Limon business loop ==
Interstate 70 Business
- Location: Limon
- Length: 4.26 mi (6.86 km)

Interstate 70 Business (I-70 Bus.) serves Limon and has both its terminuses at a concurrency of I-70, US 24, US 40, and US 287. It starts at exit 359 west of Limon at a diamond interchange and heads south along with US 24, US 40, and US 287. It makes a left turn at the first traffic signal and enters town as Main Street. The route passes under the Interstate at a diamond interchange at exit 361 then loops around and ends at another diamond interchange at exit 363 on I-70. US 24 becomes concurrent with I-70 and US 40/US 287 remain concurrent with each other as they continue southeast.

Major intersections
The entire route is in Lincoln County.

Location	mi	km	Destinations	Notes
Limon	0.000	0.000	I-70 / US 24 / US 40 / US 287	Western terminus; begins concurrency with US 24, US 40 and US 287.
	0.48	0.77	US 24 west – Colorado Springs	US 24 splits to western terminus and through downtown.
	1.37	2.20	SH 71 south (Main St.)	Begins concurrency with SH 71.
	1.97	3.17	SH 71 north (1st Ave.) – Brush	Ends concurrency with SH 71.
	2.55	4.10	I-70	Diamond interchange
	4.26	6.86	I-70 / US 24 / US 40 / US 287	Eastern terminus; US 40 and US 287 continues southeast. US 24 becomes concurrent with I-70.
1.000 mi = 1.609 km; 1.000 km = 0.621 mi: Concurrency terminus

== Vona business spur ==
Interstate 70 Business
- Location: Vona
- Length: 0.53 mi (850 m)

Interstate 70 Business (I-70 Bus.) serves Vona and runs from US 24 to I-70. It starts at a diamond interchange at exit 412 on I-70 and goes north as County Road 23 (1st Avenue). The route ends at US 24 (North Street) before entering Vona. The route is unsigned.

Major intersections
The entire route is in Kit Carson County.

Location	mi	km	Destinations	Notes
	0.000	0.000	I-70	Southern terminus
Vona	0.53	0.85	US 24 (North St.) – Seibert, Burlington	Northern terminus
1.000 mi = 1.609 km; 1.000 km = 0.621 mi

== Burlington business loop ==
Interstate 70 Business
- Location: Burlington
- Length: 1.97 mi (3.17 km)

Interstate 70 Business (I-70 Bus.) serves Burlington and has both its terminuses at I-70. It starts at a diamond interchange east of Burlington as Rose Avenue. It is concurrent with US 24. The route becomes concurrent with US 385 along with US 24 after it intersects 8th Street. After passing through downtown, it makes a left turn at Lincoln Street, remaining concurrent with US 385 until it meets I-70 again at another diamond interchange where it terminates. The route appears to be unsigned but it is signed along the Interstate.

Major intersections
The entire route is in Kit Carson County.

Location	mi	km	Destinations	Notes
Burlington	0.000	0.000	I-70 / US 385 (Lincoln St.)	Western terminus; begins concurrency with US 385
	0.59	0.95	US 24 (Rose Ave.) / US 385	Begins concurrency with US 24.
	1.68	2.70	US 24 / US 385 (8th St.)	Ends concurrency with US 385.
	1.97	3.17	I-70 / US 24	Eastern terminus; US 24 becomes concurrent with I-70. Road continues east as County Rd. V / Rose Ave.
1.000 mi = 1.609 km; 1.000 km = 0.621 mi: Concurrency terminus
