= Rabbit Ears Pass =

Mountain pass in Colorado, USA

Coordinates: 40°23′05″N 106°36′42″W

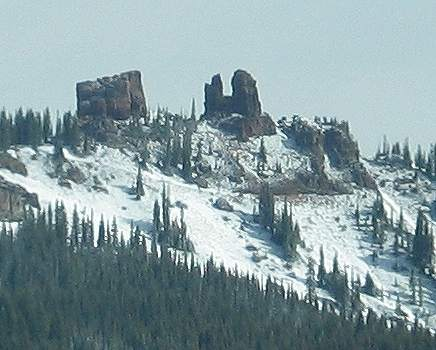
- View of Rabbit Ears Peak from the Pass
- Interactive map of Rabbit Ears Pass
- Elevation: 2,873 m (9,426 ft)
- Traversed by: US 40

Third Approach
- Location: Jackson / Grand counties, Colorado, United States
- Range: Rocky Mountains
- Topo map: Terraserver map

Rabbit Ears Pass (el. 9426 ft, 2873 m) is a high mountain pass in the Rocky Mountains of northern Colorado in the United States, where U.S. Route 40 crosses the Park Range (Colorado). North of the summit is Rabbit Ears Peak which has the shape of rabbit ears, which displays two large columns of basalt rock formations from the second volcanic episode. Rabbit Ears Peak is underlain by a pink tuff and the basalt immediately to the west is underlain by red, vesicular ash. Volcanic breccia occurs only at the Peak, which is a large stratified breccia pile. The three basal layers are cut by a basalt dike immediately beneath the peak. From petrographic evidence there appears to have been one period of lava flows and this surface can be seen at Rabbit Ears Peak.

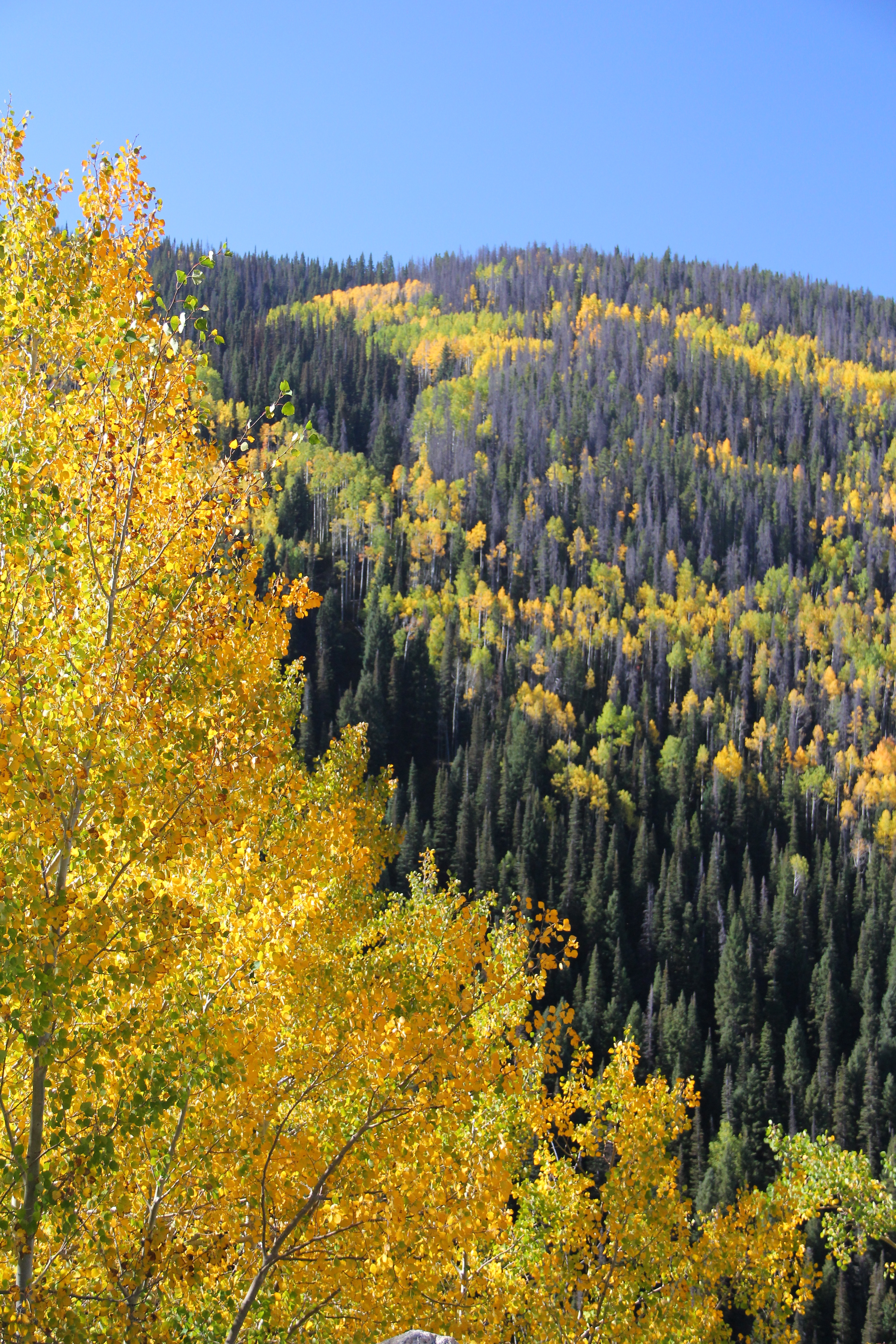

The Rabbit Ears Pass area covers 56 square miles in north central Colorado at the junction of the Rabbit Ears Range and the Park Range. The Rabbit Ear Pass highway, which is one of the most important transcontinental road links in the nation, was built by the state of Colorado, Routt, Grand, and Jackson counties, and the United States Forest Service. It was started in 1911 and was not completed until 1917. Present work is along lines of reducing curves and improving the roadbed. The road connects Routt with Jackson and Grand counties and furnishes direct connection with Denver by way of Kremmling and Berthoud Pass, where the main range is crossed again. The pass straddles the Continental Divide at the southern end of the Park Range. The name is taken from nearby Rabbit Ears Peak, a mountain in Jackson County, CO in the Park Range to the north that is prominently visible from the east side of the pass during good weather. The pass separates the upper basin of the Yampa River on the west from North Park and the upper basin of the North Platte River on the east. U.S. Highway 40 travels over the pass between Steamboat Springs and Kremmling; this is one of three crossings of the Continental Divide along the highway, along with nearby Muddy Pass to the southeast and the much higher Berthoud Pass closer to Denver.

The climate of Rabbit Ears Pass is generally semi-arid to humid. Vegetation consists mostly of pine, spruce, and aspen trees. Sagebrush grows on the Niobrara, Pierre and Coalmount formations. Undergrowth is dense in most places. Like many places in the West, Rabbit ears Pass experienced a decline in Engelmann spruce (Picea engelmannii) trees due to episodic outbreaks of the spruce bark beetle (Dendroctonus rufipennis). During the 1940s much of the subalpine zone of Northwest Colorado was severely affected by beetle outbreak. Spruce beetle outbreaks have taken place in this area in 1716-1750, 1827-1845, 1860-1870, and 1940-1960. Large-scale outbreaks of spruce beetle have long been an important component of the dynamics of subalpine forests in Colorado. During outbreaks, spruce beetle may attack and kill lodgepole pine (Pinus contorta) as well as spruce. Nearly all attacked trees are killed

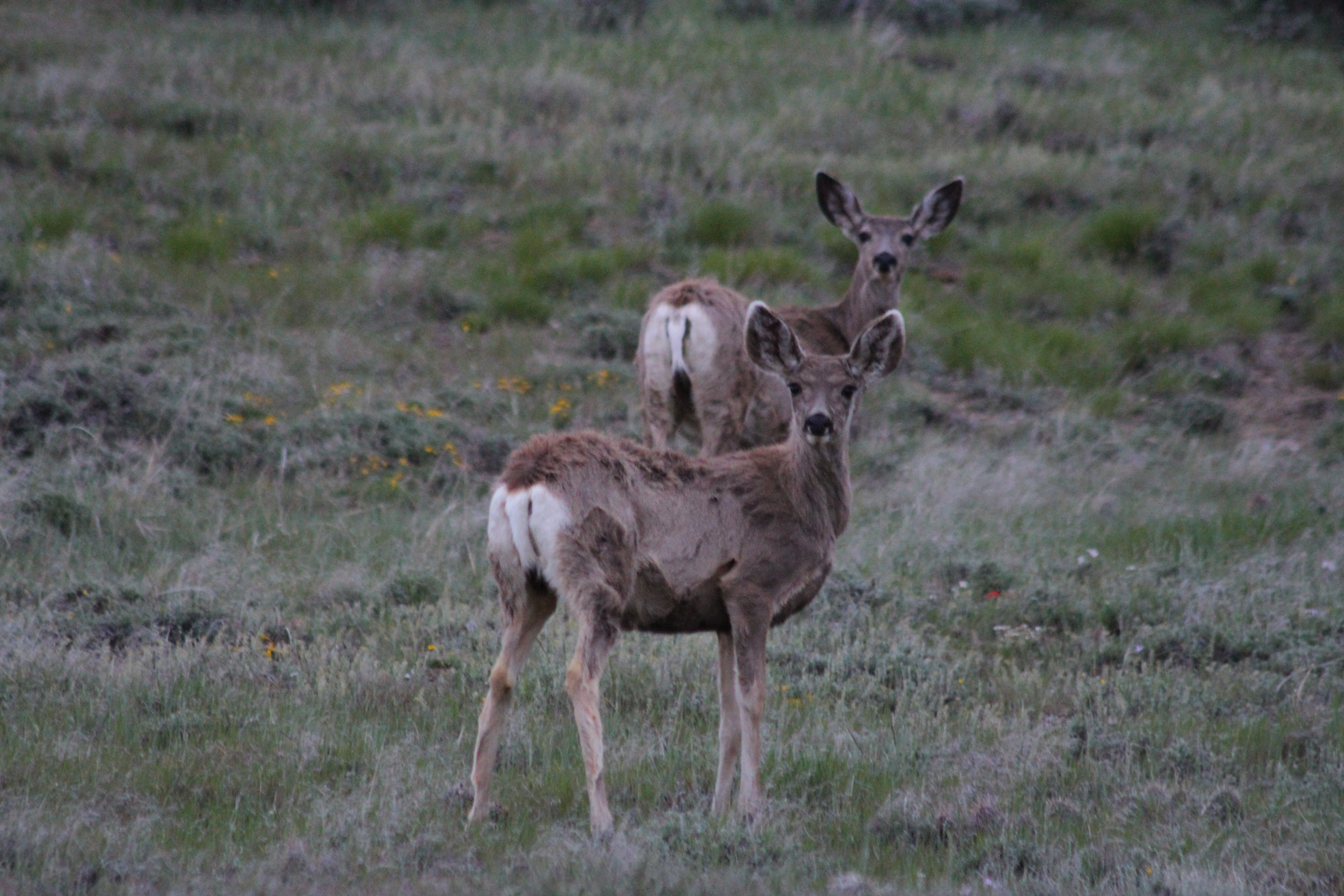

This pass offers habitat to many different animal species. It supports important winter and summering ranges for many animals. Species commonly seen on the pass range from elk, mule deer, and moose, to black bears, foxes, long-tailed weasels, snowshoe hares, and a variety of bird species. The winter snowpack provides a seasonal habitat for many non-hibernating burrowing animals such as voles, lemmings, and shrews. The snowpack helps to make a subnivean zone, which is a porous material composed mostly of air acting as a reliable thermal insulator.

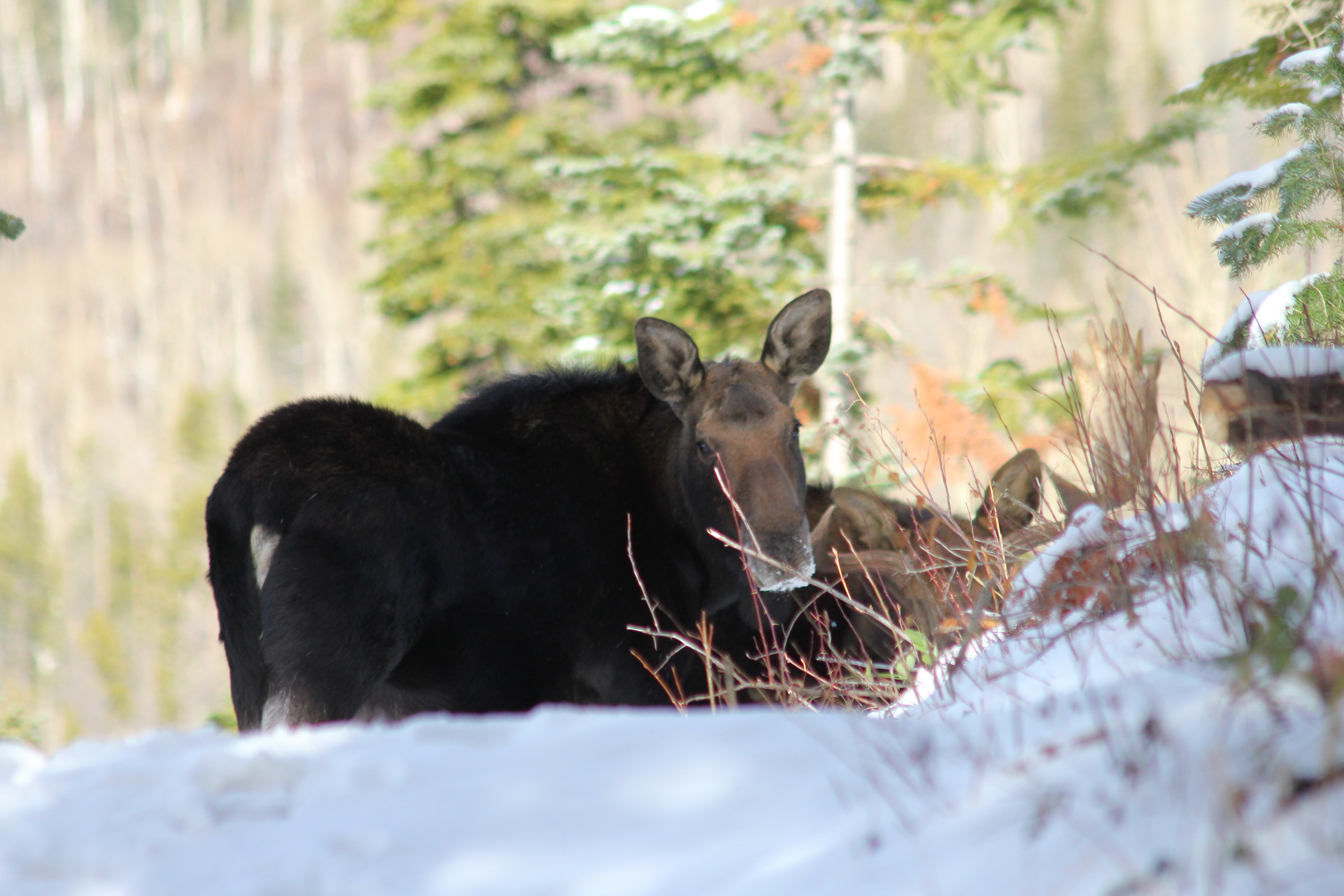
A cow and bull moose on Rabbit Ears Pass

Although lower in elevation than many of the high mountain passes farther to the south in the Colorado Rockies, Rabbit Ears Pass often receives a great deal of snow in winter and is subject to regular short closures during heavy winter storms. The seasonal snowpack on this pass is a major source of water for residence in the nearby area. Rabbit Ears pass is a place for many different outdoor recreational activities. In the winter, it is a popular spot for back country snowboarding and skiing, cross-country skiing, and snowshoeing. There are boundaries set up to separate motorized use from foot traffic. These established boundaries decrease conflicts between users and seasonal closures related to snow depth and animal wintering ranges. Non-motorized recreation is permitted west of the pass and motorized recreation is permitted east of the pass. The boundary designating winter recreational usage on Rabbit Ears Pass provides an opportunity to study the influence of motorized recreation on the physical properties of the snowpack and animal use. The United States Department of Agriculture (USDA) Forest Service managing the Routt National Forest has not only implemented boundary regulations, but they have also put into effect regulatory practices designating the start of the snowmobile season when the unpacked snow depth equals or exceeds 30 cm (12 inches). There have been limited studies regarding the effectiveness of the current management plan with respect to an adequate snow depth that would minimize the potential impact motorized winter recreationalists have on this seasonal habitat.

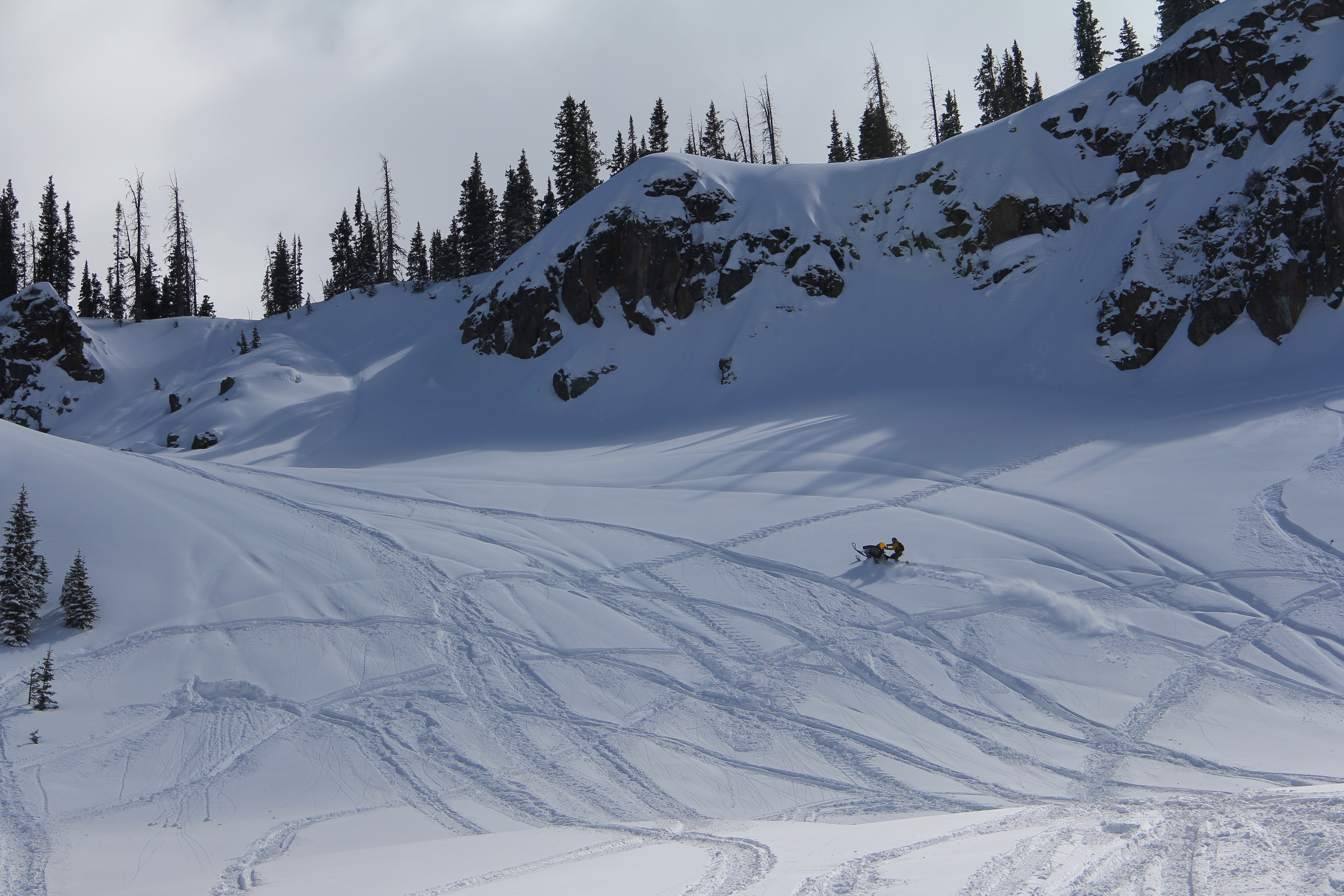
Rabbit Ears Pass offers one of the best places to snowmobile in all of Northwest Colorado

Summer activities on the pass include the increasingly popular "Run Rabbit Run" 50 mile or 100 mile trail run. The area offers many car camping spots and hiking trails. One of the most popular summer sports to take place on the pass is road biking. Steamboat Springs often hosts a stage of the USA Pro Cycling Tour. This international bike competition takes riders up and over the pass descending into Steamboat Springs during end of a stage, and ascending over the pass during the beginning of the next stage. The pass also hosts the "Ride the Divide" Mountain bike race that takes place from Montana to Mexico every year. The trail over the pass begins at 10,038' (3060 m) at Base Camp Trailhead and ends at 9250' (2819 m) in the Medicine Bow National Forest, WY. The trail is 68.1 miles (99.5 km). This trail offers outstanding views east into North Park and west towards Utah. Users need to be prepared for weather extremes at all times.

Somewhat unusually, the highway over Rabbit Ears Pass has a gently rolling character in the vicinity of the summit. After crossing the Divide westbound, the road dips briefly and then reaches its highest point (about 9426 ft) before descending gently to the west summit (9400 ft) and then dropping steeply (6.8% N) toward Steamboat Springs. This is the 28th steepest pass in the State of Colorado. The steep grade necessitates many sharp curves because of the steep rise of 3,000' in the seven mile descent into the town of Steamboat Springs. There is a single runaway truck ramp on this last stretch for truckers whose brakes become hot while descending the grade. The highway is significantly less steep on the eastern side of the pass, where it descends along a slow incline towards Muddy Pass.

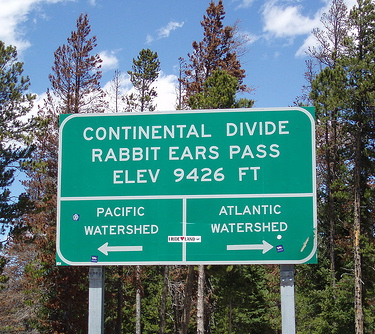
Continental Divide sign at Rabbit Ears Pass

The current crossing of the Divide represents a realignment of the highway from a somewhat higher crossing just to the north. Access to Old Rabbit Ears Pass can be achieved by turning north off U.S. 40 toward Dumont Lake. The old summit is marked with a stone monument. The old highway is now Grand County Road 199. From the old summit, it is easy to reach the base of Rabbit Ears Peak via 4x4 trails.
