= Agate, Colorado =

Unincorporated community in Elbert County, Colorado, United States

- unincorporated community
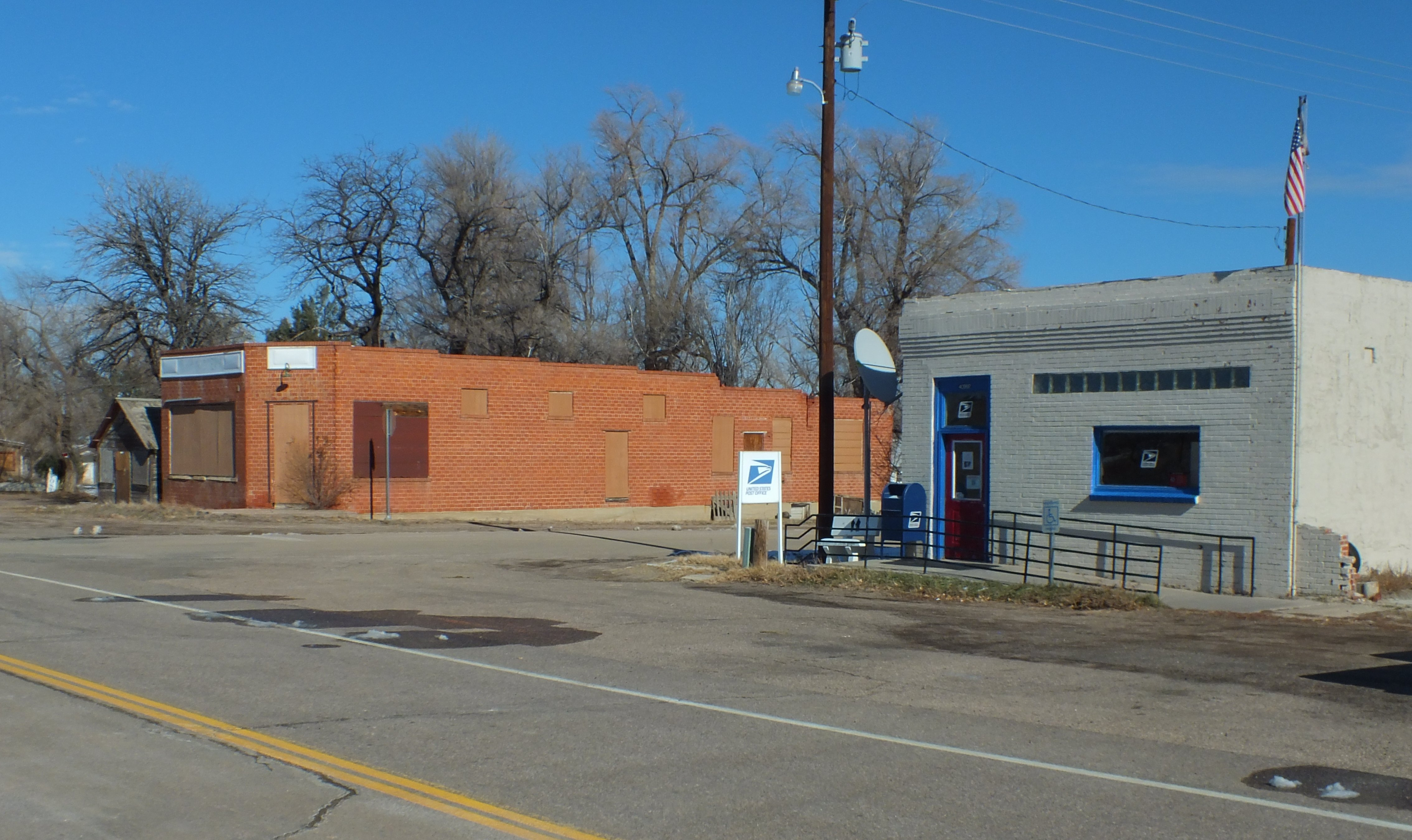
- Agate, Colorado

- Location of Agate, Colorado. Agate (Colorado)
- Coordinates: 39°27′42″N 103°56′32″W
- Country: United States
- State: Colorado
- County: Elbert
- Settled: About 1876

Government
  - Type: Unincorporated community
  - Body: Elbert County
- Elevation: 5,446 ft (1,660 m)
- Time zone: UTC−07:00 (MST)
  - Summer (DST): UTC−06:00 (MDT)
- ZIP code: 80101
- GNIS pop ID: 204818

Agate is an unincorporated community and U.S. Post Office in Elbert County, Colorado, United States. The ZIP Code of the Agate Post Office is 80101.

== History ==
The town of Gebhard was established by the Union Pacific Railroad about 1876. The Gebhard post office opened on April 8, 1881. The name of the town was changed to Agate on April 24, 1882. Although "Gebhard" was established by the UPRR, the town of Agate existed, by that name, as a locality used by local ranchers prior to the construction of the railroad. The town's name most probably comes from an "A-gate" – a wooden gate with an A-shaped cross-brace, but is sometimes claimed to be named for agate found in the area. The northeasternmost community in Elbert County, Agate is a ranching community and the home of Agate School District 300, one of the smallest school districts in Colorado.

== Geography ==
Agate is located in northeast Elbert County on one of the four segments of old US 40/US 287 (now State Highway 40) just off Interstate 70 at exit 340, and along the Union Pacific Railroad line between Limon and Aurora. It is located approximately 12 miles SSE of Deer Trail. The town is located on a NNW-SSE ridge bounded by an unnamed ravine separating it from the ridge on which I-70 is constructed, and by the Agate Creek valley to the west, and is divided by the railroad tracks. The school, post office, and a number of businesses and homes are located east of the tracks, and a grain elevator and a few houses to the west of the tracks. In recent years, several small subdivisions have been platted and homes constructed in the general area.

== Cemeteries ==
- River Bend Cemetery: Take Exit 354 off I-70 5 miles west of Limon, CO. Follow frontage road north of the interstate through cattle gate and turn left up the hill approx. 1/2 mile
- Norton Cemetery
- Gair Cemetery

== Emergency services ==
Agate Fire Department

== See also ==
- List of populated places in Colorado
- List of post offices in Colorado
