= Peoria, Colorado =

Census-designated place in Arapahoe County, CO, USA

- Census-designated place
- Location of the Peoria CDP in Arapahoe County, Colorado
- Coordinates: 39°39′15″N 104°08′04″W
- Country: United States
- State: Colorado
- County: Arapahoe County

Government
  - Type: unincorporated community

Area
  - Total: 13.804 sq mi (35.753 km^{2})
  - Land: 13.765 sq mi (35.650 km^{2})
  - Water: 0.040 sq mi (0.103 km^{2})
- Elevation: 5,273 ft (1,607 m)

Population (2020)
  - Total: 153
  - Density: 11.1/sq mi (4.29/km^{2})
- Time zone: UTC-7 (MST)
  - Summer (DST): UTC-6 (MDT)
- ZIP Code: Byers 80103
- Area codes: 303 & 720
- GNIS feature ID: 2583277

Peoria is an unincorporated community and a census-designated place (CDP) located in and governed by Arapahoe County, Colorado, United States. The CDP is a part of the Denver–Aurora–Lakewood, CO Metropolitan Statistical Area. The population of the Peoria CDP was 153 at the United States Census 2020. The Byers post office (ZIP code 80103) serves the area.

== Geography ==
The Peoria CDP has an area of 8,835 acres (35.753 km^{2}), including 25 acres (0.103 km^{2}) of water.

== Demographics ==
The United States Census Bureau initially defined the Peoria CDP for the United States Census 2010.

Peoria CDP, Colorado
Year	Pop.	±%
2010	163	—
2020	153	−6.1%
Source: United States Census Bureau

== See also ==
- Front Range Urban Corridor
