= Fraser River (Colorado) =

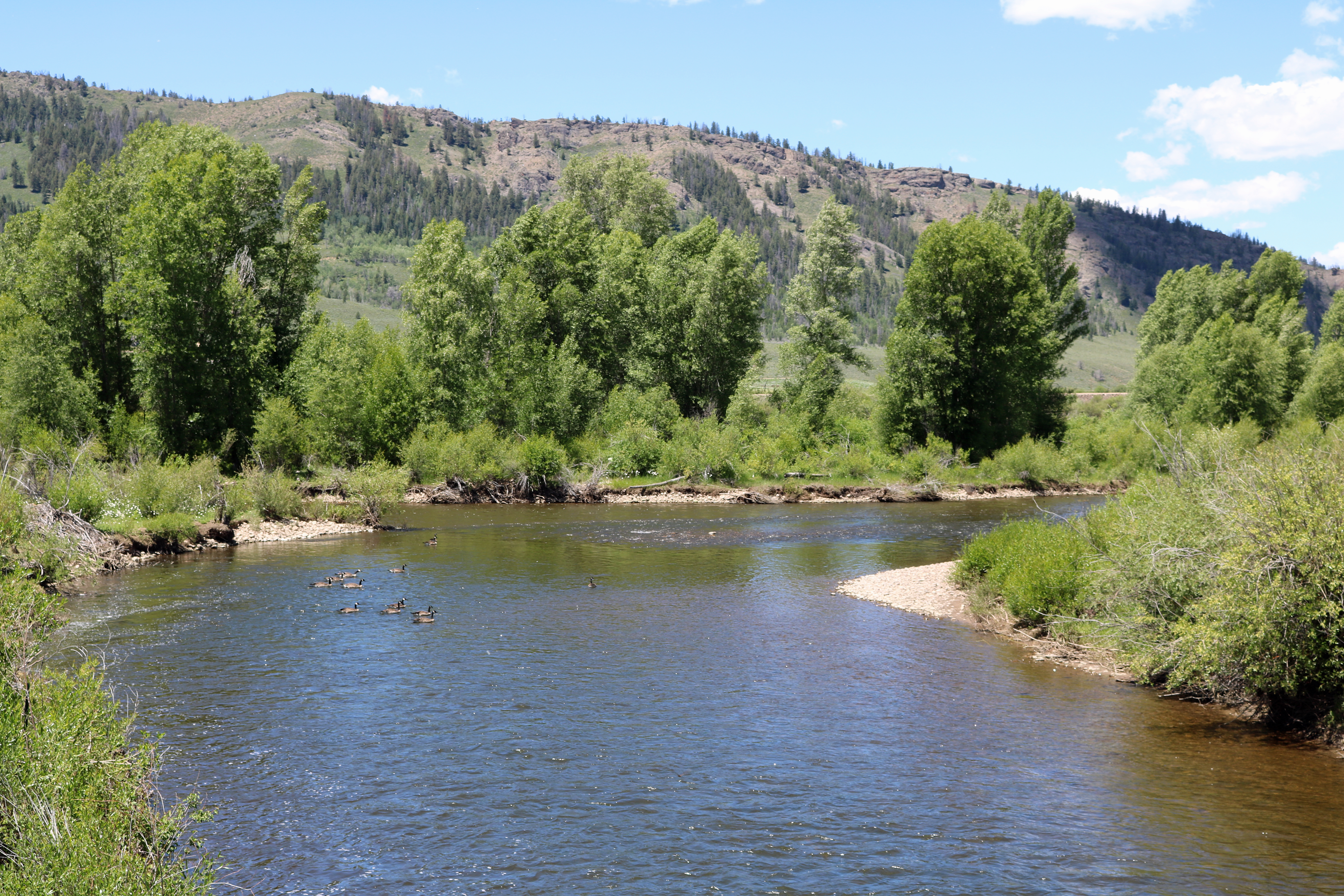
- The confluence of the Fraser and Colorado rivers. The Fraser enters the picture from the center left.

Physical characteristics
- Source
  - coordinates: 39°48′06″N 105°46′27″W
- Mouth
  - location: Confluence with Colorado
  - coordinates: 40°06′01″N 105°58′27″W
  - elevation: 7,841 ft (2,390 m)
- Length: 32.5 mi (52.3 km)

Basin features
- Progression: Colorado

The Fraser River is a tributary of the Colorado River, approximately 32.5 miles (52.3 km) long, in north central Colorado in the United States. It drains a large portion of the Middle Park basin in Grand County in the Rocky Mountains west of Boulder and southwest of Rocky Mountain National Park. It rises at the continental divide on the north side of Berthoud Pass in the Arapaho National Forest. It flows NNW past Winter Park, Fraser, and Tabernash, and joins the Colorado River from the south two miles west of Granby.

== Fishing ==
The Fraser holds wild rainbows, browns, brooks, and cutthroats. The Fraser River starts near Berthoud Pass. As it runs north for its first 8 miles, it is on National Forest land and is publicly accessible. The river is narrow and shallow here, but worthy of fishing.

From Winter Park to Fraser, the river can be accessed by the Fraser River Trail (hiking or mountain bikes), from USFS campgrounds, or road turnouts. The only exception is as the river flows through private land in the town of Winter Park. You can go fishing in the forested lands, or where the river starts into the valley.

Access to the Fraser River is limited downstream from the town of Fraser. Some of the best fishing is in the canyon downstream from Tabernash, however this is on private land.

== See also ==
- List of rivers of Colorado
- List of tributaries of the Colorado River
