= Colorado State Highway 196 =

State highway in Colorado, United States

State Highway 196

Route information
- Maintained by CDOT
- Length: 8.922 mi (14.359 km)

Major junctions
- West end: US 50 near McClave
- East end: US 287 near Wiley

Location
- Country: United States
- State: Colorado
- Counties: Bent, Prowers

Highway system
- Colorado State Highway System; Interstate; US; State; Scenic
← SH 194	→ SH 202

State Highway 196 (SH 196) is a state highway near Wiley, Colorado. SH 196's western terminus is at U.S. Route 50 (US 50) near McClave, and the eastern terminus is at US 287 south of Wiley.

== Route description ==
SH 196 runs 8.9 miles (14.3 km), starting at junction with US 50 near McClave. The highway goes north past McClave, turns east at CR MM and ends at a junction with US 287 just south of Wiley.

== Major intersections ==
County	Location	mi	km	Destinations	Notes
Bent		0.000	0.000	US 50 – Las Animas, Lamar	Western terminus
Prowers		8.922	14.359	US 287 – Eads, Lamar	Eastern terminus
1.000 mi = 1.609 km; 1.000 km = 0.621 mi
