= Colorado State Highway 71 =

State highway in Colorado, United States

State Highway 71
- SH 71 highlighted in red

Route information
- Maintained by CDOT
- Length: 224.65 mi (361.54 km)

Major junctions
- South end: US 350 near La Junta
- US 50 near Rocky Ford; I-70 in Limon; I-70 BL / US 24 / US 40 / US 287 in Limon; US 36 at Last Chance; I-76 near Brush
- North end: N-71 south of Kimball

Location
- Country: United States
- State: Colorado
- Counties: Otero, Crowley, Lincoln, Washington, Morgan, Weld

Highway system
- Colorado State Highway System; Interstate; US; State; Scenic
← I-70 BL	→ SH 72

State Highway 71 (CO 71 or SH 71) is a 224-mile-long (360 km) state highway passing several other highways in northern and central Colorado. SH 71's southern terminus is at U.S. Route 350 (US 350) near La Junta, and the northern terminus is a continuation as Nebraska Highway 71 (N-71) at the Nebraska border, which eventually crosses into South Dakota as South Dakota Highway 71 (SD-71), making Highway 71 a triple-state highway.

State Highway 71 is the subject of a truck freight diversion feasibility study being conducted by the Colorado Department of Transportation to explore diverting truck traffic from Interstate 25.

== Route description ==
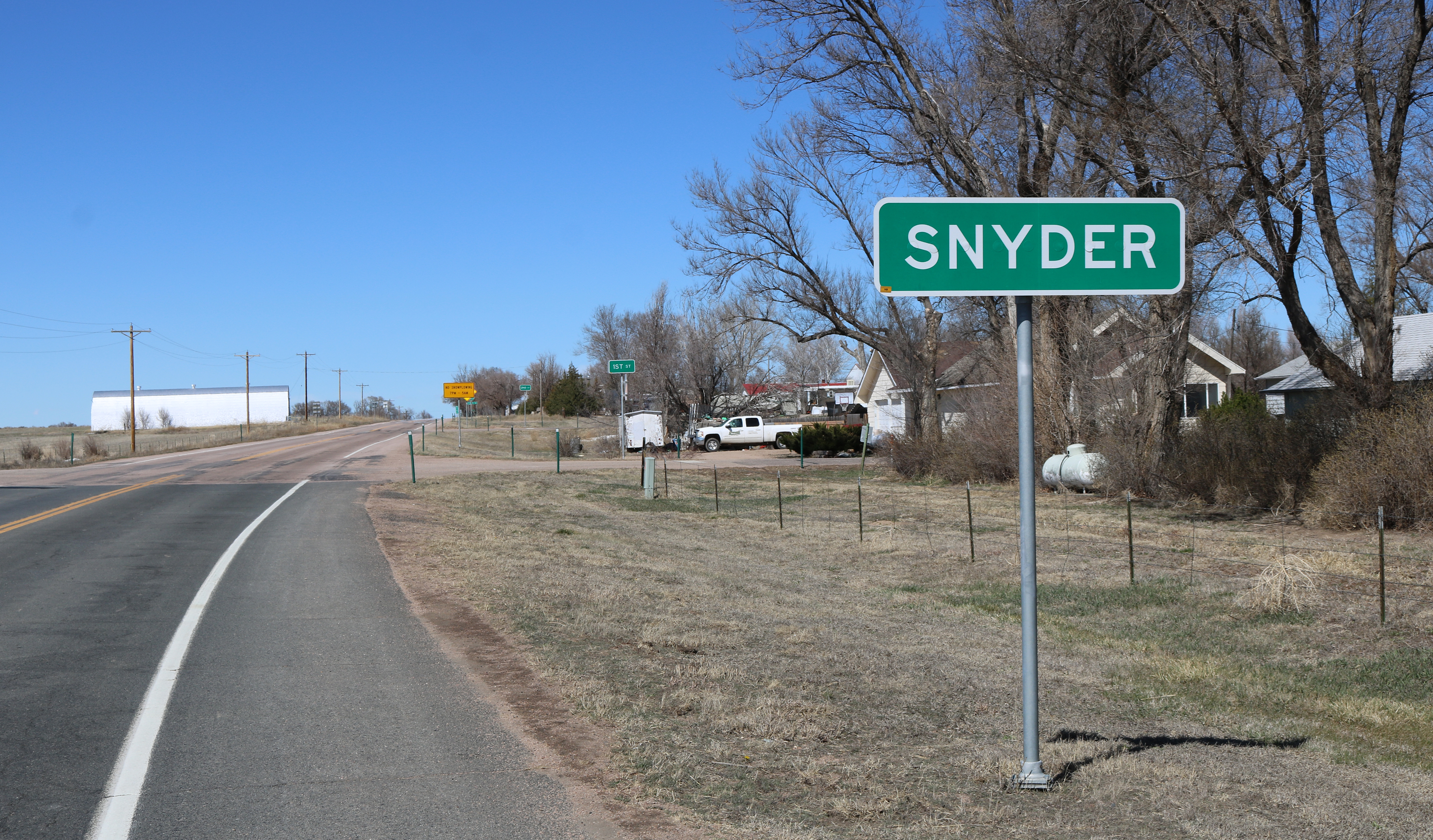
SH 71 as it enters Snyder

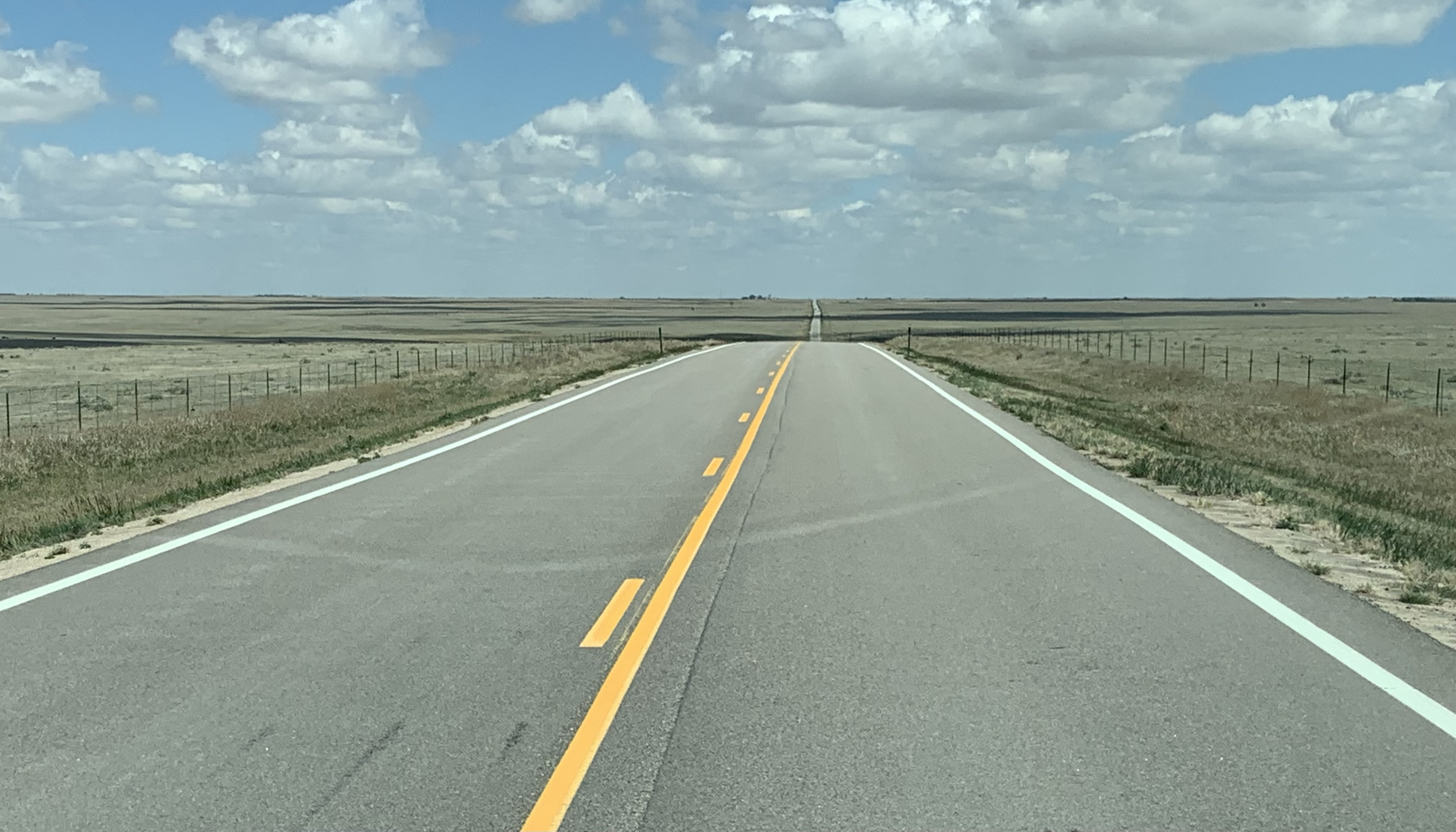
Looking North on Colorado State Highway 71

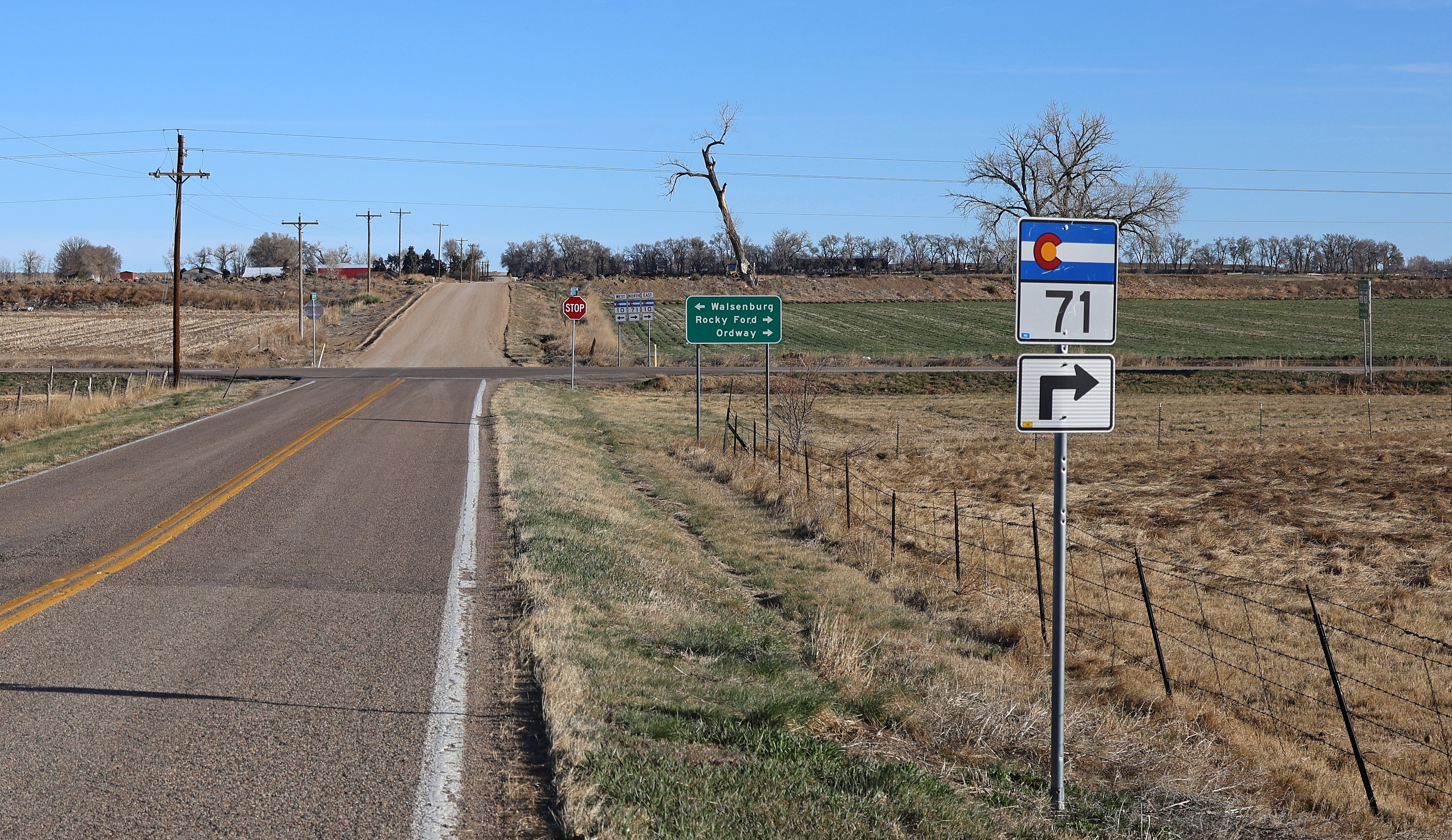
SH 71 going through Otero County

SH 71 begins at its southern terminus with U.S. Route 350 in La Junta, Colorado. It proceeds north into Crowley County and the city of Ordway, where it is signed as Phantom Avenue. The highway continues northward to a junction with Interstate 70 (I-70) adjacent to US 24.

In La Junta, the highway continues north for several miles to Ordway, then it takes a northeast turn to Limon. It then goes back north and skirts the town of Brush. It then heads through rural country to Nebraska.

In Stoneham, the state portion of the road overlaps County Road 142 and heads to the north. The route takes a northeast turn and continues in to Nebraska as N-71.

== Major intersections ==
County	Location	mi	km	Destinations	Notes
Otero		0.00	0.00	US 350 – Trinidad, La Junta, Timpas	Southern terminus
Otero		9.03	14.53	SH 10 west – Walsenburg	south end of SH 10 overlap
Otero		9.6	15.4	SH 10 east – La Junta	north end of SH 10 overlap
Otero	Rocky Ford	14.54	23.40	US 50 east / SH 266 east – Cheraw, La Junta	south end of US 50 overlap; western terminus of SH 266
Otero	Rocky Ford			SH 202 west	Eastern terminus of SH 202
Otero		16.16	26.01	US 50 west – Pueblo	north end of US 50 overlap
Crowley	Ordway	26.65	42.89	SH 96 west – Pueblo	south end of SH 96 overlap
Crowley	Ordway	26.88	43.26	SH 96 east – Eads, Ordway Business District	north end of SH 96 overlap
Lincoln	Punkin Center	72.6	116.8	SH 94 – Colorado Springs, Kit Carson	
Lincoln	Limon	101.06	162.64	US 24 west / US 40 west / US 287 north to I-70 – Denver	south end of US 24 / US 40 / US 287 overlap
Lincoln	Limon	101.97	164.10	US 24 east / US 40 east / US 287 south to I-70 – Burlington	north end of US 24 / US 40 / US 287 overlap
Washington	Last Chance	138.02	222.12	US 36 – Denver, Anton	
Morgan		174.36	280.61	US 34 east to I-76 – Sterling, Wray	south end of US 34 overlap
Morgan	Brush	175.49	282.42	US 34 west	north end of US 34 overlap
Morgan	Brush	176.45	283.97	I-76 (US 6) – Denver, Fort Morgan, Sterling	I-76 exit 90. (Denver is not explicitly signed for I-76 West at the intersection - only Fort Morgan)
Weld		201.64	324.51	SH 14 east – Sterling	south end of SH 14 overlap
Weld		205.52	330.75	SH 14 west – Ault, Fort Collins	north end of SH 14 overlap
Weld		232.9	374.8	N-71 north – Kimball	Continues north at Nebraska state line
1.000 mi = 1.609 km; 1.000 km = 0.621 mi: Concurrency terminus
