= Colorado State Highway 202 =

State highway in Colorado, United States

State Highway 202
- SH 202 highlighted in red

Route information
- Maintained by CDOT
- Length: 3.228 mi (5.195 km)

Major junctions
- West end: CR 16 / CR FF west of Rocky Ford
- East end: US 50 / SH 71 in Rocky Ford

Location
- Country: United States
- State: Colorado
- Counties: Otero

Highway system
- Colorado State Highway System; Interstate; US; State; Scenic
← SH 196	→ SH 207

State Highway 202 (SH 202) is a short highway in Otero County, Colorado. SH 202's western terminus is at County Route 16 (CR 16) where it continues west as CR FF west of Rocky Ford, and the eastern terminus is at U.S. Route 50 (US 50) and SH 71 in Rocky Ford.

== Route description ==
SH 202 begins at the intersection with County Road 16 and County Road FF. It heads east, crossing two waterways, the Catlin and Otero canals, The road then passes through a mix of rural housing and farmland before entering the city limits of Rocky Ford and turning north toward the intersection of South Second Street and Walnut Avenue.

The route then travels north along Second Street for two blocks, crossing a line of the BNSF Railway before intersecting Elm Street, a one-way street which carries eastbound US 50 and southbound SH 71. SH 202 heads to the northeast for two blocks along Second Street and intersects Swink Avenue, the opposite one-way direction of US 50 and SH 71, where the state highway ends.

== Major intersections ==
The entire route is in Otero County.

Location	mi	km	Destinations	Notes
Rocky Ford	0.000	0.000	US 50 west / SH 71 north (Swink Avenue)	Eastern terminus
Rocky Ford	0.110	0.177	US 50 east / SH 71 south (Elm Street)	
	3.228	5.195	CR 16 north / CR FF west	Western terminus; road continues as CR FF
1.000 mi = 1.609 km; 1.000 km = 0.621 mi

== See also ==
- List of state highways in Colorado
