= Tabernash, Colorado =

Census-designated place in Grand County, CO, USA

- Census-designated place
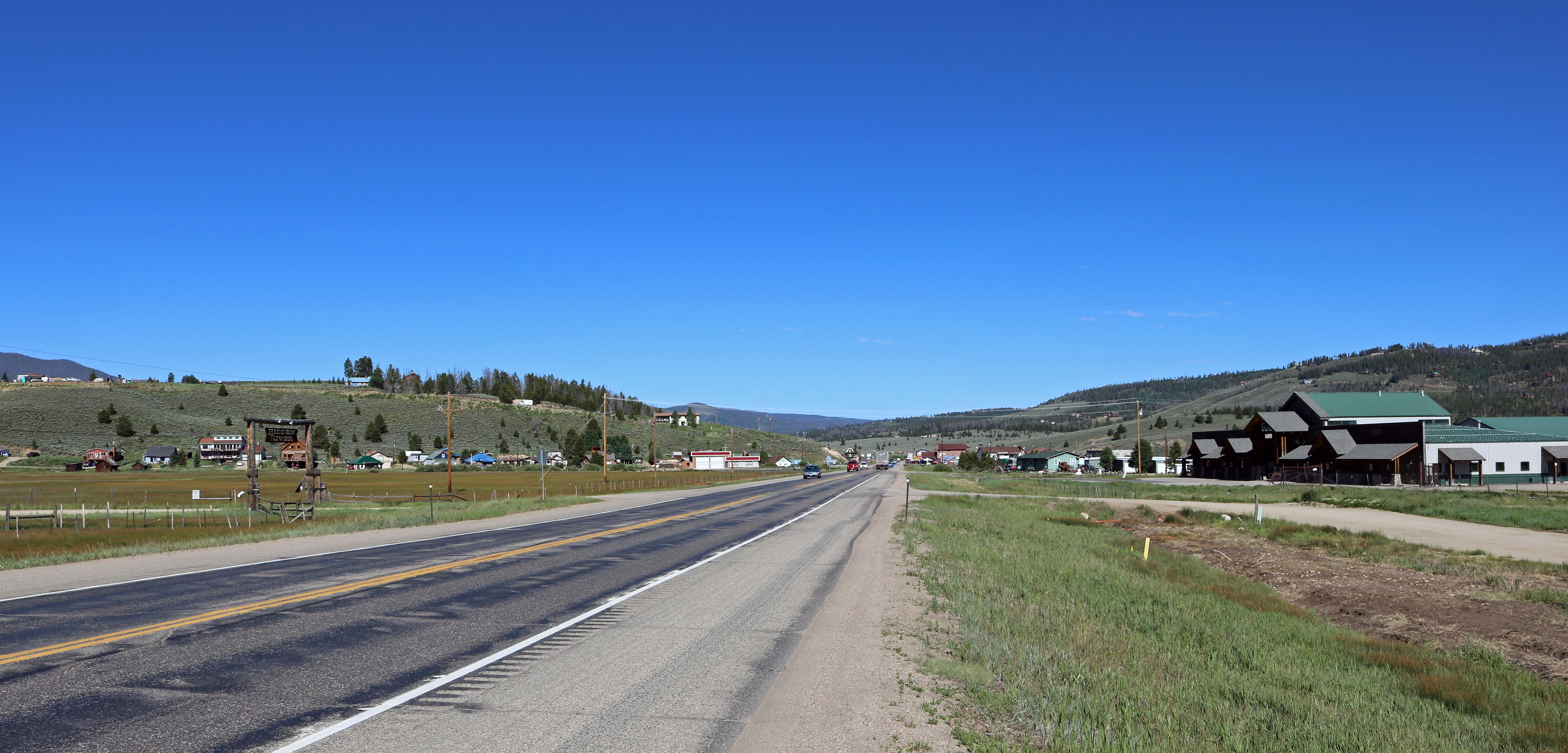
- Tabernash in 2016

- Location of the Tabernash CDP in Grand County, Colorado
- Coordinates: 39°58′42″N 105°50′54″W
- Country: United States
- State: Colorado
- County: Grand County

Government
  - Type: unincorporated town

Area
  - Total: 4.747 sq mi (12.295 km^{2})
  - Land: 4.747 sq mi (12.295 km^{2})
  - Water: 0 sq mi (0.000 km^{2})
- Elevation: 8,403 ft (2,561 m)

Population (2020)
  - Total: 401
  - Density: 84.5/sq mi (32.6/km^{2})
- Time zone: UTC-7 (MST)
  - Summer (DST): UTC-6 (MDT)
- ZIP Code: 80478
- Area code: 970
- GNIS feature ID: 2410044

Tabernash is an unincorporated town, a post office, and a census-designated place (CDP) located in and governed by Grand County, Colorado, United States. The Tabernash post office has the ZIP Code 80478. At the United States Census 2020, the population of the Tabernash CDP was 401.

== History ==
The Tabernash Post Office has been in operation since 1905. The community has the name of a Ute Indian.

=== 1984 airplane crash ===
On August 10, 1984, a Cessna L-19 Bird Dog (registration N4584A), piloted by 36-year-old James Jeb Caddell, crashed in the Arapaho National Forest near Tabernash while it was en route from Granby to Jeffco Airport. Despite the efforts of a search party, the two men could not be located at first, partly because the plane had flipped over and landed on its Emergency Locator Transmitter, destroying it. The wreckage was found by backpackers three years later on August 23, 1987.

A 6½ minute video shot from a VHS camcorder mounted on the instrument panel was found at the site. The heavily damaged tape, some of it hanging from tree branches, was recovered and repaired by Colorado deputy sheriff Dale Wood. Subsequent analysis of the footage revealed that the pilot had not taken into account the density altitude conditions that existed on the day of the flight. The aircraft was unable to climb away from steadily rising terrain. In an attempt to return to the departure airfield, the pneumatic stall warning of the airplane sounded three times during a turn to the right. The pilot could be heard yelling "Damn, hang on Ronnie!" to his one backseat passenger, 36-year-old Ronald Hugh Wilmond, three seconds before impacting the terrain and trees.

The Caddells had put a 20-year moratorium (via the FAA) on the release of the film to the general public with the only stipulation that it (at the FAA's request to the Caddells) be shown only to flight instructors at conventions and workshops. The moratorium eventually expired and was not renewed, and thus the footage became part of the public domain. The video is now viewable on YouTube.

== Geography ==
Tabernash is located in the valley of the Fraser River. U.S. Route 40 passes through the community, leading northwest 11 miles (18 km) to Granby and southeast 9 miles (14 km) to Winter Park.

The Tabernash CDP has an area of 3,038 acres (12.295 km^{2}), all land.

=== Climate ===
This climate type is dominated by the winter season, a long, bitterly cold period with short, clear days, relatively little precipitation mostly in the form of snow, and low humidity. According to the Köppen Climate Classification system, Tabernash has a subarctic climate, abbreviated "Dfc" on climate maps.

== Demographics ==
The United States Census Bureau initially defined the Tabernash CDP for the United States Census 2000.

Tabernash CDP, Colorado
Year	Pop.	±%
2000	165	—
2010	417	+152.7%
2020	401	−3.8%
Source: United States Census Bureau

== See also ==
- Arapaho National Forest
