= Colorado State Highway 391 =

State highway in Colorado, United States

State Highway 391
- Kipling Street
- SH 391 highlighted in red

Route information
- Maintained by CDOT
- Length: 9.51 mi (15.30 km)

Major junctions
- South end: US 285 in Lakewood
- North end: I-70 in Wheat Ridge

Location
- Country: United States
- State: Colorado
- Counties: Jefferson

Highway system
- Colorado State Highway System; Interstate; US; State; Scenic
← SH 389	→ SH 392

State Highway 391 (SH 391) is a 9.51-mile (15.30 km) long north–south state highway in the vicinity of Denver, Colorado.

== Route description ==
The southern terminus of the route is at U.S. Route 285 (US 285) in Lakewood. The northern terminus is at Interstate 70 (I-70) exit 267 in Wheat Ridge. The road is known as Kipling Parkway from US 285 north to West Mississippi Avenue and Kipling Street from Mississippi to I-70.

== History ==
The route was established in 1955, when it began at Colfax Avenue and headed south to Alameda Avenue. The northern terminus was extended to 44th Avenue by 1967 and to I-70 by 1968. SH 391 was extended south to US 285 in 1985.

== Major intersections ==
The entire route is in Jefferson County.

Location	mi	km	Destinations	Notes
Lakewood	0.0	0.0	US 285 / Kipling Street – Fairplay, Englewood	Southern terminus; road continues south as Kipling Street
Lakewood	1.0	1.6	SH 8 (Morrison Road)	
Lakewood	5.1	8.2	US 6 (Sixth Avenue)	
Lakewood	6.3	10.1	US 40 / I-70 BL (Colfax Avenue)	
Wheat Ridge	9.3	15.0	I-70	Northern terminus; I-70 exit 267
1.000 mi = 1.609 km; 1.000 km = 0.621 mi
