= Berthoud Pass =

Mountain pass in Colorado, USA

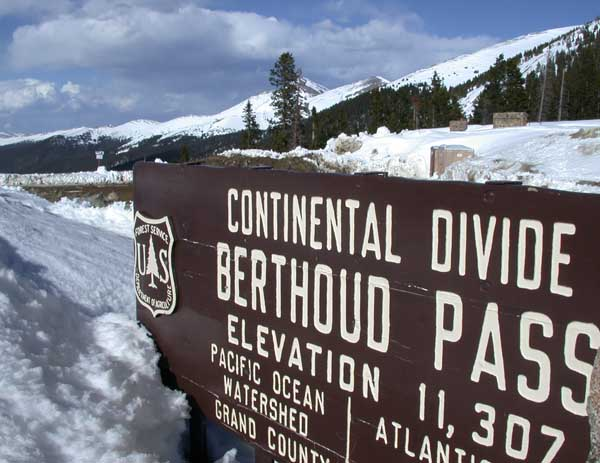
- View from the summit of Berthoud Pass

- Location within Colorado
- Elevation: 11,307 ft (3,446 m)
- Traversed by: US 40

Third Approach
- Location: Clear Creek / Grand counties, Colorado, United States
- Range: Rocky Mountains
- Coordinates: 39°47′52″N 105°46′37″W

Berthoud Pass (/ˈbɜːrθəd/ BURTH-əd; elevation 11,307 ft (3,446 m)) is a high mountain pass in central Colorado, in the Front Range of the Rocky Mountains of the western United States.

The pass is located west of Denver, and provides a high route between upper Clear Creek Canyon to the upper valley of the Fraser River in Middle Park to the north. It traverses the continental divide at the Front Range, on the border between Clear Creek County and Grand County.

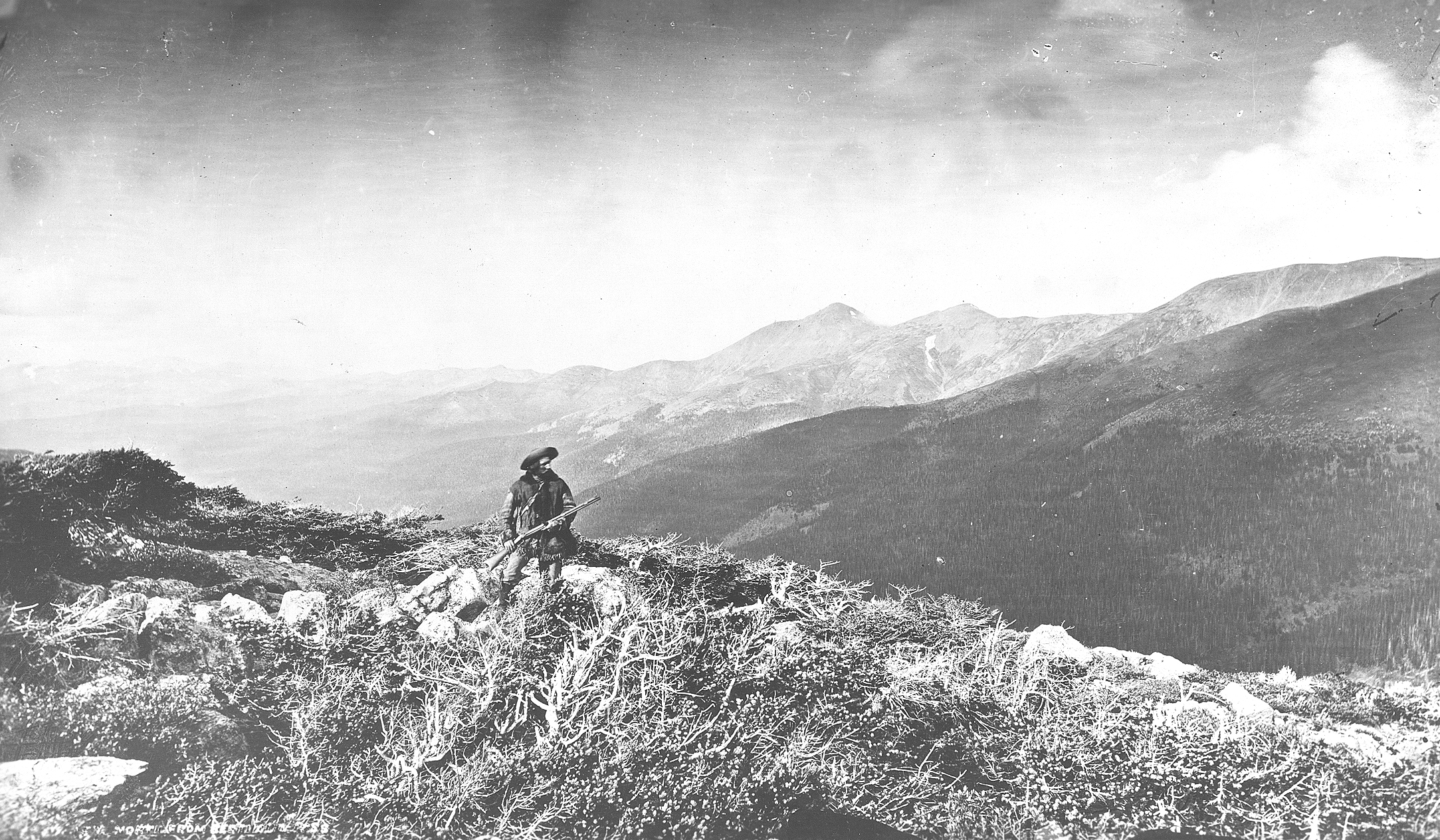
Harry Yount at Berthoud Pass in 1874

The pass is named for Edward L. Berthoud, the chief surveyor of the Colorado Central Railroad during the 1870s. Accompanied by Jim Bridger, Berthoud discovered the pass in July 1861 while surveying a possible route for the railroad. Berthoud concluded that the pass was suitable as a wagon road, but not as a railroad, and was then hired by the Central Overland California and Pikes Peak Express Company to survey a route over the pass to Salt Lake.

The route of U.S. Highway 40 currently traverses the pass north of its junction with Interstate 70 in Clear Creek Canyon. It provides primary road access to Winter Park and a secondary route to Steamboat Springs from Denver and the Colorado Front Range. However, the pass is one of the most notoriously difficult passes in Colorado for motorists, based on its height as well as the steep grades on both sides (6.3%) and the large number of switchbacks on the southern side of the pass. At least 55 avalanche paths have been mapped on Berthoud Pass, some of them intersecting U.S. Highway 40 and some of those intersecting the roadway at multiple points on the pass. In 2015, CDOT installed an automated propane-fueled avalanche mitigation system consisting of five units that create concussive blasts to mitigate snow slab buildup on avalanche path #5, Stanley.

== Geologic history ==
Berthoud Pass is found in a region of Middle Proterozoic granite that intruded through older schist and gneiss roughly 1.4 billion years ago. It was carved out by a fault zone crossing the Continental Divide. The pass is capped by metasedimentary rock and surrounded by granite on both sides.

The entire region was formed by continuing compression of the crust into the Routt and Berthoud plutonic suites. This compression led to the formation of volcanoes in New Mexico.

== Climate ==
Berthoud Pass has an extreme subalpine climate (Köppen Dfc), bordering on an alpine climate (ETH), with short summers featuring comfortable days and cold nights, and long, extremely snowy winters. The average annual snowfall is 391.2 inches or 9.9 meters, and every month from November to May averages at least 37 inches or 0.94 meters of snow. In the year from July 1983 to June 1984 snowfall reached 523.4 inches or 13 meters, including 123 inches or 3.12 meters in December 1983. Actual snow depth can be expected to peak at over 55 inches or 1.4 meters and has exceeded 110 inches or 2.8 meters.

Climate data for Berthoud Pass, Colorado, 1991–2020 normals (elevation: 11,300 feet or 3,444 meters)
Month	Jan	Feb	Mar	Apr	May	Jun	Jul	Aug	Sep	Oct	Nov	Dec	Year
Mean daily maximum °F (°C)	28.2 (−2.1)	30.0 (−1.1)	37.8 (3.2)	43.0 (6.1)	50.6 (10.3)	59.1 (15.1)	64.7 (18.2)	62.5 (16.9)	56.7 (13.7)	45.8 (7.7)	35.7 (2.1)	27.6 (−2.4)	45.1 (7.3)
Daily mean °F (°C)	17.1 (−8.3)	18.7 (−7.4)	25.4 (−3.7)	30.9 (−0.6)	39.4 (4.1)	48.1 (8.9)	53.7 (12.1)	51.7 (10.9)	46.1 (7.8)	35.1 (1.7)	25.0 (−3.9)	16.6 (−8.6)	34.0 (1.1)
Mean daily minimum °F (°C)	6.1 (−14.4)	7.2 (−13.8)	12.9 (−10.6)	18.8 (−7.3)	28.0 (−2.2)	37.0 (2.8)	42.6 (5.9)	40.9 (4.9)	35.1 (1.7)	24.4 (−4.2)	13.8 (−10.1)	5.6 (−14.7)	22.7 (−5.2)
Average precipitation inches (mm)	4.10 (104)	4.02 (102)	4.37 (111)	5.21 (132)	3.66 (93)	1.82 (46)	2.39 (61)	2.34 (59)	2.31 (59)	2.94 (75)	3.38 (86)	3.77 (96)	40.31 (1,024)
Average precipitation days	16.8	16.6	16.5	17.7	13.5	7.6	9.0	10.5	9.5	10.9	12.7	15.2	156.5
Source 1: XMACIS2
Source 2: NOAA (Precipitation)

Climate data for Berthoud Pass, Colorado (Elevation 11,313 feet or 3,448 meters)
Month	Jan	Feb	Mar	Apr	May	Jun	Jul	Aug	Sep	Oct	Nov	Dec	Year
Record high °F (°C)	42 (6)	47 (8)	50 (10)	57 (14)	62 (17)	70 (21)	76 (24)	75 (24)	73 (23)	63 (17)	54 (12)	47 (8)	76 (24)
Mean maximum °F (°C)	37.1 (2.8)	39.8 (4.3)	43.7 (6.5)	50.1 (10.1)	57.5 (14.2)	65.8 (18.8)	70.3 (21.3)	68.4 (20.2)	64.1 (17.8)	56.1 (13.4)	46.5 (8.1)	39.5 (4.2)	71.2 (21.8)
Mean daily maximum °F (°C)	21.2 (−6.0)	24.2 (−4.3)	28.7 (−1.8)	36.2 (2.3)	45.0 (7.2)	54.2 (12.3)	61.9 (16.6)	59.9 (15.5)	53.0 (11.7)	42.4 (5.8)	30.4 (−0.9)	23.2 (−4.9)	40.0 (4.4)
Daily mean °F (°C)	11.3 (−11.5)	13.4 (−10.3)	17.5 (−8.1)	24.9 (−3.9)	34.1 (1.2)	43.1 (6.2)	50.5 (10.3)	49.0 (9.4)	42.0 (5.6)	31.7 (−0.2)	20.1 (−6.6)	13.2 (−10.4)	29.2 (−1.6)
Mean daily minimum °F (°C)	1.4 (−17.0)	2.0 (−16.7)	6.2 (−14.3)	13.6 (−10.2)	23.1 (−4.9)	32.0 (0.0)	39.2 (4.0)	38.0 (3.3)	31.0 (−0.6)	20.9 (−6.2)	9.8 (−12.3)	3.2 (−16.0)	18.4 (−7.6)
Mean minimum °F (°C)	−19.9 (−28.8)	−15.2 (−26.2)	−11.4 (−24.1)	−1.9 (−18.8)	7.8 (−13.4)	20.8 (−6.2)	32.3 (0.2)	30.4 (−0.9)	17.6 (−8.0)	4.4 (−15.3)	−7.7 (−22.1)	−14.4 (−25.8)	−23.1 (−30.6)
Record low °F (°C)	−33 (−36)	−34 (−37)	−24 (−31)	−12 (−24)	−3 (−19)	11 (−12)	26 (−3)	21 (−6)	4 (−16)	−5 (−21)	−28 (−33)	−30 (−34)	−34 (−37)
Average precipitation inches (mm)	3.49 (89)	2.90 (74)	4.11 (104)	4.43 (113)	3.85 (98)	2.23 (57)	2.45 (62)	2.63 (67)	2.05 (52)	2.36 (60)	3.36 (85)	3.63 (92)	37.48 (952)
Average snowfall inches (cm)	49.8 (126)	42.4 (108)	57.9 (147)	54.6 (139)	37.2 (94)	11.8 (30)	0 (0)	0.3 (0.76)	8.7 (22)	28.0 (71)	49.1 (125)	51.4 (131)	391.2 (994)
Source: The Western Regional Climate Center

== Wildlife ==
Berthoud Pass is known for the wide variety of wildflowers growing in the area. It is also a known migratory route for a variety of animals, including the Canada lynx.

== Human history ==
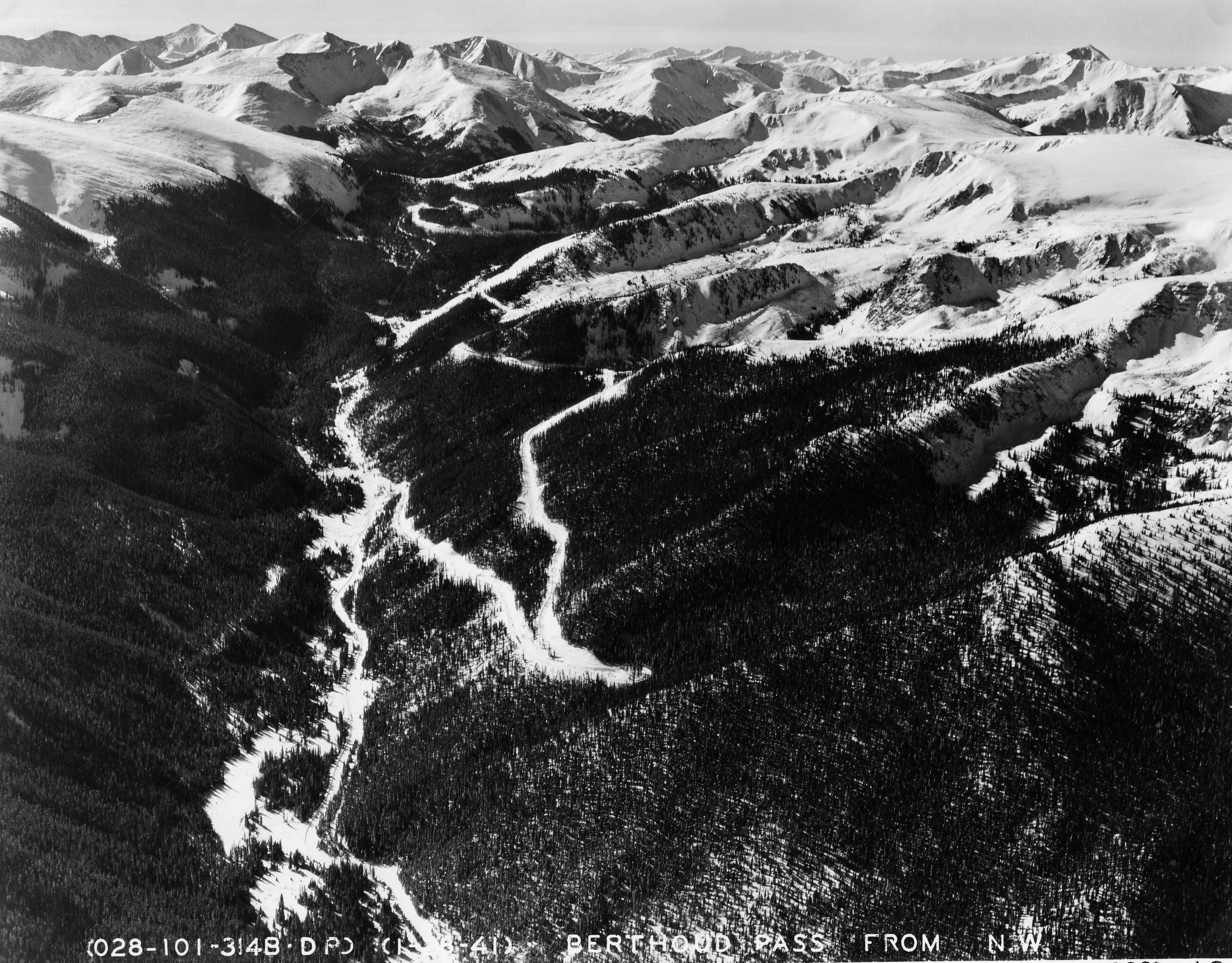
The pass in 1941

=== Berthoud Pass Ditch ===
In 1902, the 3.5 mile (5.6 km) Berthoud Pass Ditch began diverting water from the headwaters of the Fraser River over the continental divide into the basin of Clear Creek. Initially, this water was used for irrigation, but the cities of Northglenn and Golden purchased the ditch in the mid-1980s. The ditch has a capacity of 53.4 cubic feet per second (1.51 m^{3}/s),

The ditch was blocked in 1999 by the collapse of the tunnel under the parking lot at the summit of the pass, but it was repaired the next year. In the decade since the repairs, the ditch has typically diverted on the order of 500 acre-feet (600,000 m^{3}) per year.

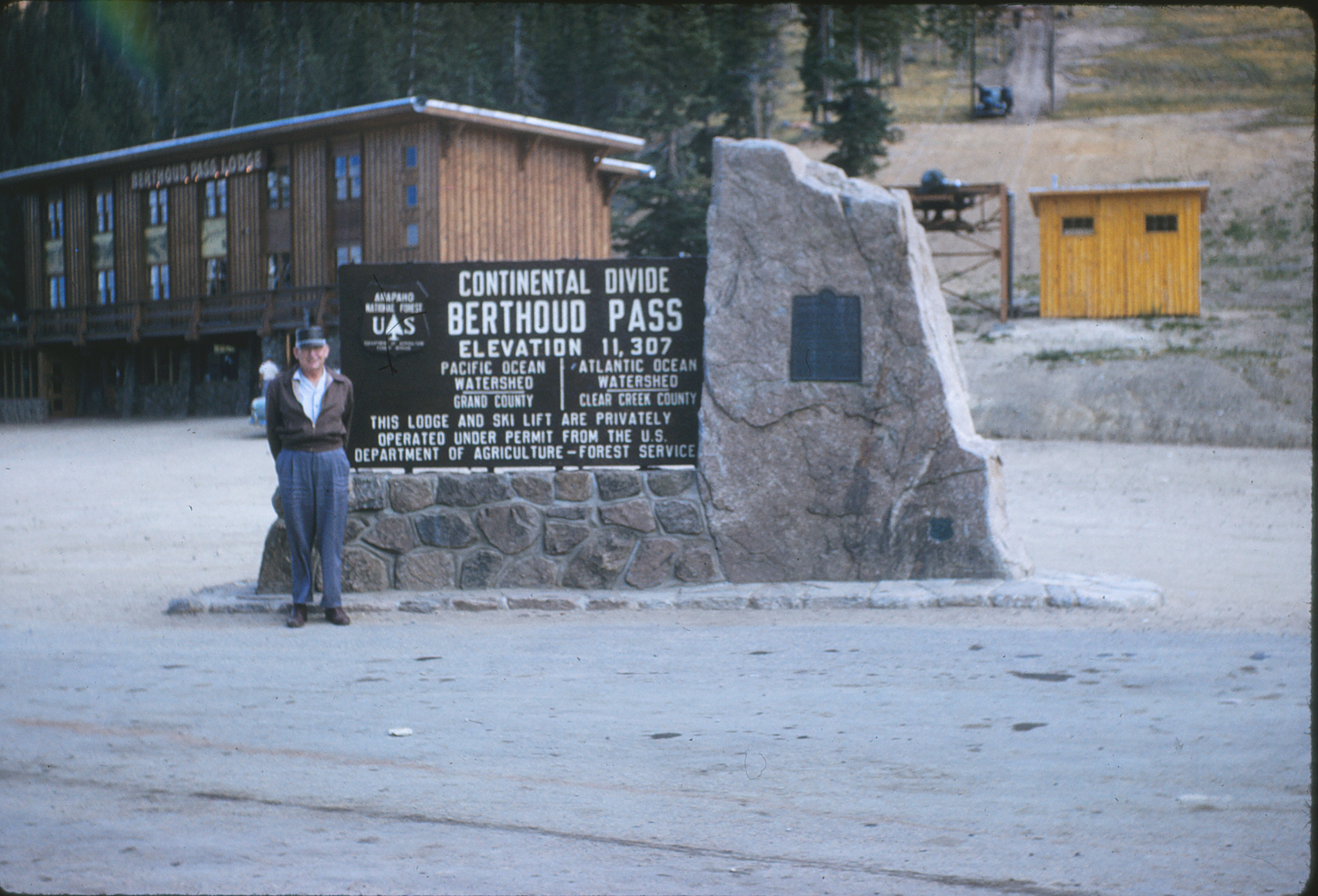
Berthoud Pass sign and lodge, circa 1962

=== Berthoud Pass Ski Area ===
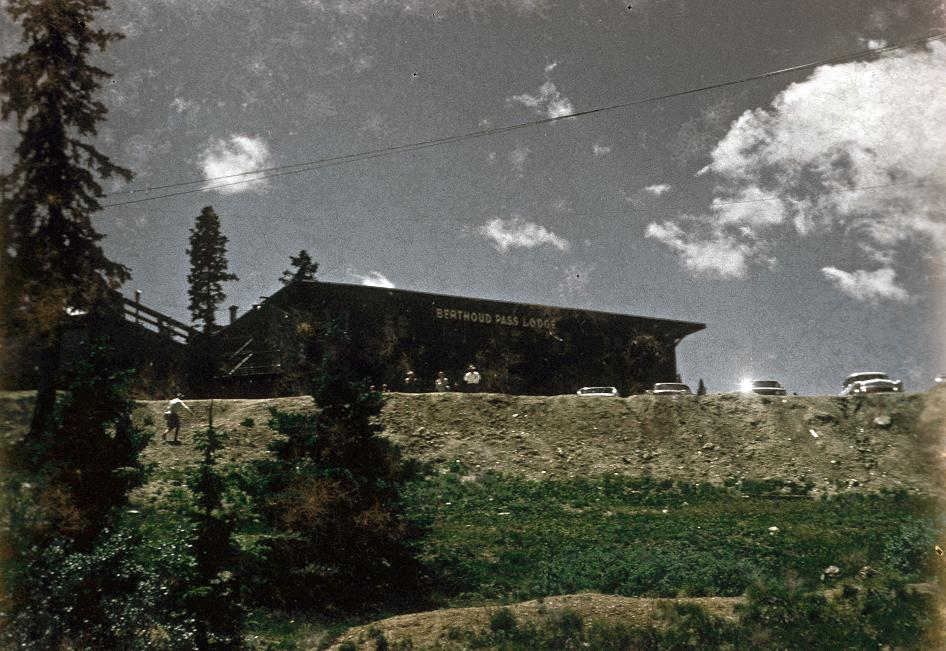
Berthoud Pass Lodge July 1963

Once home to the now-defunct Berthoud Pass Ski Area, the pass is a destination for local backcountry skiers, snowboarders, and snowshoers due to its abundance of steep and challenging terrain and plentiful snow averaging 500 inches annually. The twisting road on both sides of the pass also makes "car shuttles" possible, eliminating the need for skiers and snowboarders to hike back to the top of the pass after each run.

The ski resort was closed in 2002 due to financial problems caused by lack of water and sewage at the top of the pass. In 2003 the lifts were taken down, while some people continued to ski using snowcats for lift transportation. In 2005 the Colorado DOT began using a fund to restore the area to its natural state. First on the list was the demolition of the historic lodge.

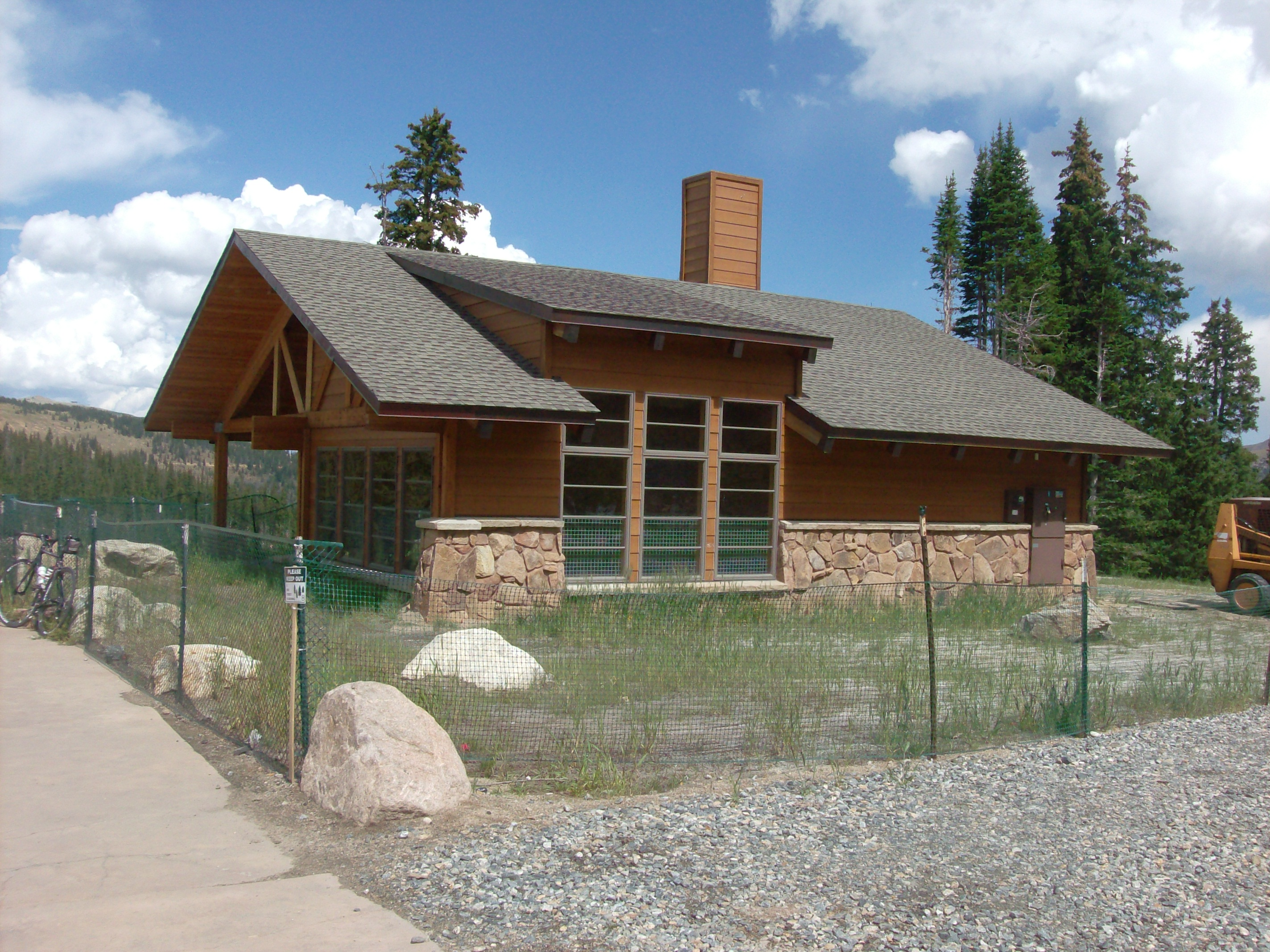
New building in September 2013

A new warming hut was opened at the top of the pass in May 2008, along with an expanded parking area, two scenic viewing areas and a new summit marker sign. The ski lodge and facilities had been in use since the early 1950s and the new warming hut includes modern features such as composting toilets, radiant floor heating and green construction.

Berthoud Ski resort is claimed by some to have been the first resort and lift in Colorado. Some say it was the first resort to openly welcome snowboarders.

The summit of Berthoud Pass is located at approximately 39°47′53.70″N 105°46′36.88″W.

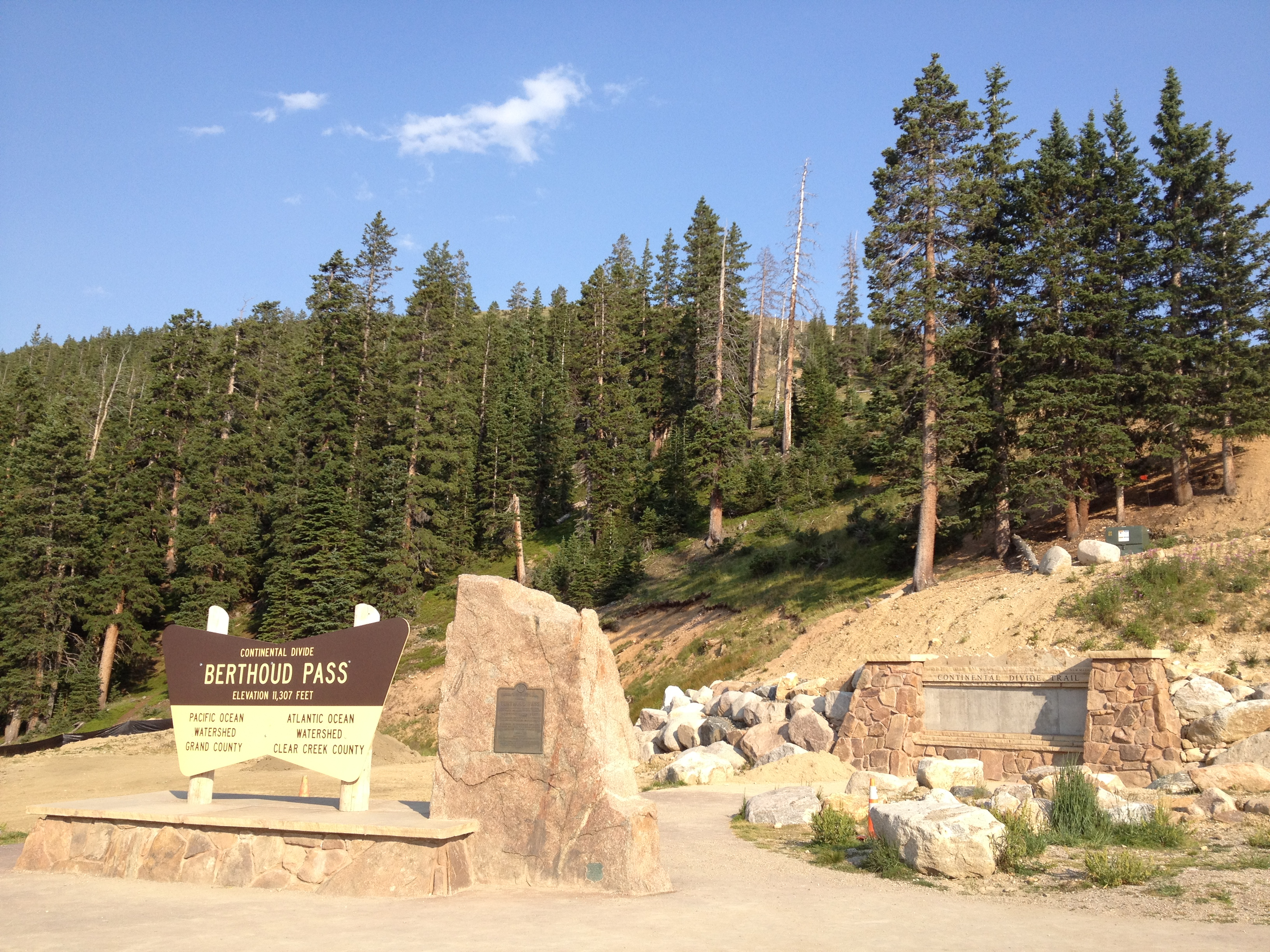
Berthoud Pass current signs
