= Byers, Colorado =

Census-designated place in Arapahoe County, Colorado, United States

- Census-designated place
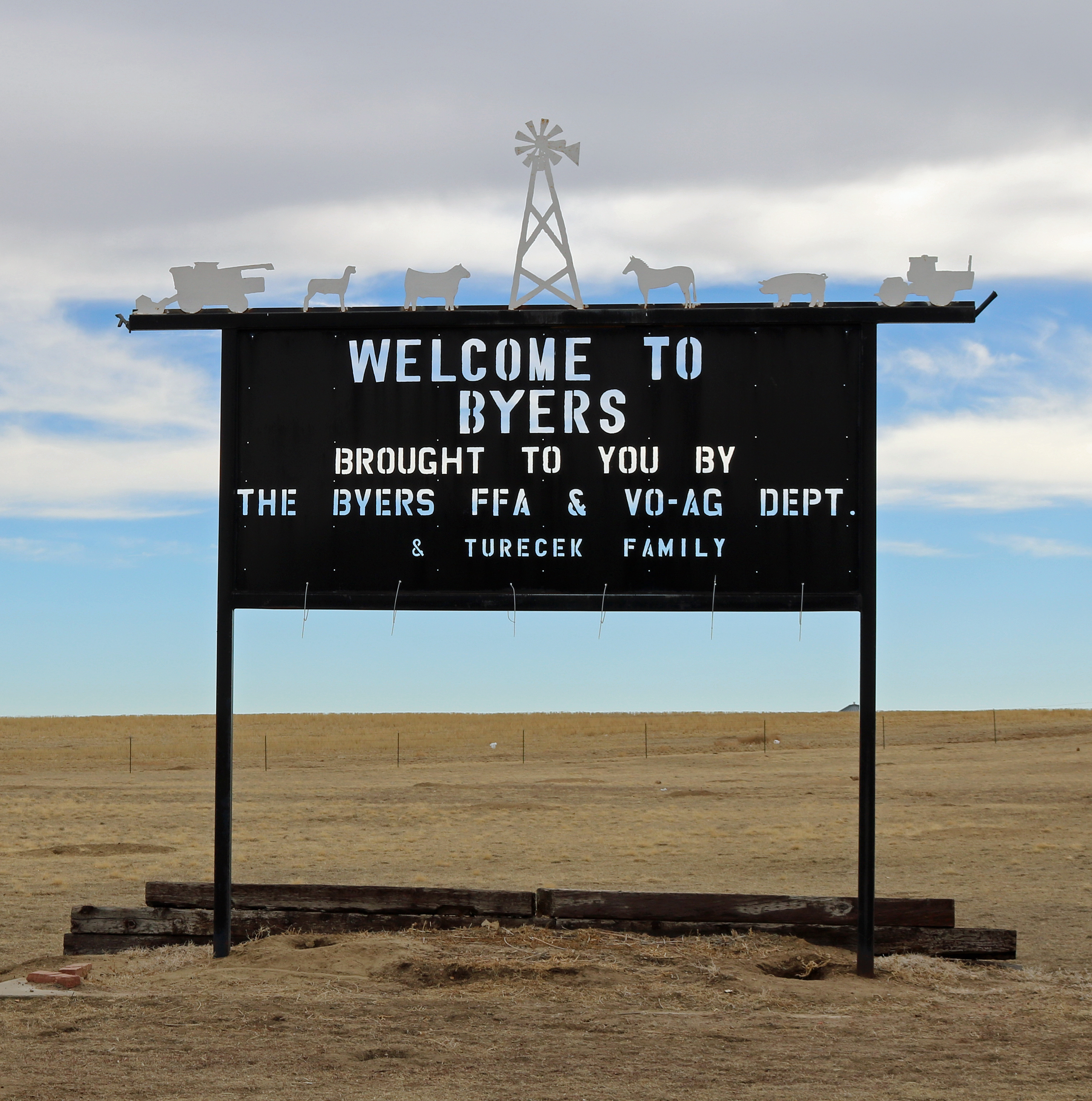
- A welcome sign in Byers.

- Location of the Byers CDP in Arapahoe County, Colorado.
- Coordinates: 39°42′36″N 104°13′08″W
- Country: United States
- State: Colorado
- County: Arapahoe

Government
  - Type: unincorporated community
  - Body: Arapahoe County

Area
  - Total: 11.974 sq mi (31.013 km^{2})
  - Land: 11.451 sq mi (29.657 km^{2})
  - Water: 0.524 sq mi (1.356 km^{2})
- Elevation: 5,210 ft (1,590 m)

Population (2020)
  - Total: 1,322
  - Density: 115.5/sq mi (44.58/km^{2})
- Time zone: UTC−07:00 (MST)
  - Summer (DST): UTC−06:00 (MDT)
- ZIP code: 80103
- Area codes: 303/720/983
- GNIS town ID: 2407933
- FIPS code: 08-10985

Byers is an unincorporated town, a post office, and a census-designated place (CDP) located in and governed by Arapahoe County, Colorado, United States. The CDP is a part of the Denver–Aurora–Lakewood, CO Metropolitan Statistical Area. The Byers post office has the ZIP Code 80103. At the United States Census 2020, the population of the Byers CDP was 1,322.

== History ==
The Byers Post Office has been in operation since 1873. Byers comprises two distinct districts, being the bustling Downtown Byers, and the Historic Uptown Byers. The community took the name of William Byers, the first Colorado newspaper editor.

== Geography ==
The Byers CDP has an area of 7,663 acres (31.013 km^{2}), including 335 acres (1.356 km^{2}) of water.

=== Climate ===
According to the Köppen Climate Classification system, Byers has a cold semi-arid climate, abbreviated "BSk" on climate maps.

Climate data for Byers, Colorado, 1991–2020 normals, extremes 1930–2019
Month	Jan	Feb	Mar	Apr	May	Jun	Jul	Aug	Sep	Oct	Nov	Dec	Year
Record high °F (°C)	74 (23)	78 (26)	85 (29)	92 (33)	98 (37)	106 (41)	106 (41)	104 (40)	101 (38)	91 (33)	81 (27)	76 (24)	106 (41)
Mean maximum °F (°C)	62.0 (16.7)	66.1 (18.9)	75.6 (24.2)	82.3 (27.9)	90.0 (32.2)	97.2 (36.2)	101.3 (38.5)	98.2 (36.8)	93.6 (34.2)	84.6 (29.2)	74.7 (23.7)	63.8 (17.7)	101.5 (38.6)
Mean daily maximum °F (°C)	42.3 (5.7)	44.6 (7.0)	54.3 (12.4)	61.2 (16.2)	70.5 (21.4)	82.9 (28.3)	89.5 (31.9)	87.0 (30.6)	79.3 (26.3)	65.2 (18.4)	52.5 (11.4)	42.5 (5.8)	64.3 (18.0)
Daily mean °F (°C)	28.3 (−2.1)	30.2 (−1.0)	39.5 (4.2)	46.3 (7.9)	56.0 (13.3)	66.9 (19.4)	73.4 (23.0)	71.3 (21.8)	62.9 (17.2)	49.2 (9.6)	37.3 (2.9)	28.1 (−2.2)	49.1 (9.5)
Mean daily minimum °F (°C)	14.2 (−9.9)	15.8 (−9.0)	24.7 (−4.1)	31.5 (−0.3)	41.5 (5.3)	50.9 (10.5)	57.4 (14.1)	55.6 (13.1)	46.5 (8.1)	33.2 (0.7)	22.2 (−5.4)	13.8 (−10.1)	33.9 (1.1)
Mean minimum °F (°C)	−8.1 (−22.3)	−6.8 (−21.6)	6.0 (−14.4)	15.8 (−9.0)	27.6 (−2.4)	38.3 (3.5)	48.0 (8.9)	47.3 (8.5)	31.4 (−0.3)	16.8 (−8.4)	0.5 (−17.5)	−9.8 (−23.2)	−18.3 (−27.9)
Record low °F (°C)	−32 (−36)	−36 (−38)	−19 (−28)	−9 (−23)	20 (−7)	29 (−2)	38 (3)	37 (3)	10 (−12)	−5 (−21)	−22 (−30)	−33 (−36)	−36 (−38)
Average precipitation inches (mm)	0.45 (11)	0.52 (13)	1.21 (31)	1.82 (46)	2.46 (62)	1.98 (50)	2.56 (65)	1.99 (51)	1.20 (30)	0.98 (25)	0.67 (17)	0.45 (11)	16.29 (412)
Average snowfall inches (cm)	6.1 (15)	6.3 (16)	7.3 (19)	5.5 (14)	0.7 (1.8)	0.0 (0.0)	0.0 (0.0)	0.0 (0.0)	0.9 (2.3)	3.8 (9.7)	5.9 (15)	6.2 (16)	42.7 (108.8)
Average precipitation days (≥ 0.01 in)	3.8	3.7	4.8	6.6	9.1	8.6	8.7	8.2	5.3	4.8	4.4	3.9	71.9
Average snowy days (≥ 0.1 in)	3.5	3.6	2.6	2.1	0.4	0.0	0.0	0.0	0.2	1.2	2.7	3.5	19.8
Source 1: NOAA
Source 2: National Weather Service (mean maxima and minima 1981–2010)

== Demographics ==
The United States Census Bureau initially defined the Byers CDP for the 1990 United States census.

Byers CDP, Colorado
Year	Pop.	±%
1990	1,065	—
2000	1,233	+15.8%
2010	1,160	−5.9%
2020	1,322	+14.0%
Source: United States Census Bureau

=== 2020 census ===
As of the 2020 census, Byers had a population of 1,322. The median age was 38.9 years. 23.9% of residents were under the age of 18 and 16.5% of residents were 65 years of age or older. For every 100 females there were 105.0 males, and for every 100 females age 18 and over there were 108.7 males age 18 and over.

0.0% of residents lived in urban areas, while 100.0% lived in rural areas.

There were 498 households in Byers, of which 28.9% had children under the age of 18 living in them. Of all households, 54.8% were married-couple households, 23.5% were households with a male householder and no spouse or partner present, and 16.1% were households with a female householder and no spouse or partner present. About 24.1% of all households were made up of individuals and 10.8% had someone living alone who was 65 years of age or older.

There were 519 housing units, of which 4.0% were vacant. The homeowner vacancy rate was 1.0% and the rental vacancy rate was 0.0%.

Racial composition as of the 2020 census
Race	Number	Percent
White	1,160	87.7%
Black or African American	14	1.1%
American Indian and Alaska Native	7	0.5%
Asian	4	0.3%
Native Hawaiian and Other Pacific Islander	0	0.0%
Some other race	49	3.7%
Two or more races	88	6.7%
Hispanic or Latino (of any race)	123	9.3%

== See also ==
- Front Range Urban Corridor
