= Deer Trail, Colorado =

Town in Colorado, US

- Home rule city
- Town of Deer Trail
- Nickname: "Home of the World's First Rodeo"
- Location of the Town of Deer Trail in Arapahoe County, Colorado
- Coordinates: 39°37′21″N 104°02′42″W
- Country: United States
- State: Colorado
- County: Arapahoe
- Platted: 1875
- Incorporated: February 3, 1920

Government
  - Type: statutory town

Area
  - Total: 1.180 sq mi (3.055 km^{2})
  - Land: 1.175 sq mi (3.044 km^{2})
  - Water: 0.0042 sq mi (0.011 km^{2})
- Elevation: 5,191 ft (1,582 m)

Population (2020)
  - Total: 1,068
  - Density: 909/sq mi (351/km^{2})
- Time zone: UTC−07:00 (MST)
  - Summer (DST): UTC−06:00 (MDT)
- ZIP code: 80105
- Area codes: 303/720/983
- GNIS town ID: 2412415
- FIPS code: 08-19630
- Website: townofdeertrail.colorado.gov

The Town of Deer Trail is a statutory town located in eastern Arapahoe County, Colorado, United States. The town population was 1,068 at the 2020 United States census, a +95.60% increase since the 2010 United States census. Deer Trail is a part of the Denver-Aurora-Centennial, CO Metropolitan Statistical Area and the Front Range Urban Corridor. The town is situated along Interstate 70, approximately 55 miles (89 km) east of Denver.

== History ==
Deer Trail was founded when the Kansas Pacific Railway built a station in what is now Deer Trail in 1870. The town was platted by the railway in 1875 and soon became a shipping point for grain, livestock, and eggs. The Deer Trail, Colorado, post office opened on June 3, 1875. The Town of Deer Trail was incorporated on February 3, 1920. By the late 1920s Deer Trail grew into a town larger than it is today with two banks, five grocery stores, and three hotels. The Great Depression of the 1930s took a major toll on the town's economy, and a further blow took place in June 1965 when a devastating flood destroyed or severely damaged the businesses along main street. Many of these buildings were never rebuilt. The site of Deer Trail hosted the first rodeo exhibition on July 4, 1869.

== Geography ==
Deer Trail is located in eastern Arapahoe County.

At the 2020 United States census, the town had a total area of 755 acres (3.055 km^{2}) including 2.7 acres (0.011 km^{2}) of water.

== Demographics ==
Historical population
Census	Pop.	Note	%±
1930	390		—
1940	387		−0.8%
1950	421		8.8%
1960	764		81.5%
1970	374		−51.0%
1980	463		23.8%
1990	476		2.8%
2000	598		25.6%
2010	546		−8.7%
2020	1,068		95.6%
U.S. Decennial Census

=== 2020 census ===
As of the 2020 census, Deer Trail had a population of 1,068. The median age was 33.0 years. 28.7% of residents were under the age of 18 and 10.7% of residents were 65 years of age or older. For every 100 females there were 103.0 males, and for every 100 females age 18 and over there were 106.2 males age 18 and over.

0.0% of residents lived in urban areas, while 100.0% lived in rural areas.

There were 385 households in Deer Trail, of which 39.7% had children under the age of 18 living in them. Of all households, 55.6% were married-couple households, 20.3% were households with a male householder and no spouse or partner present, and 17.4% were households with a female householder and no spouse or partner present. About 22.9% of all households were made up of individuals and 7.0% had someone living alone who was 65 years of age or older.

There were 439 housing units, of which 12.3% were vacant. The homeowner vacancy rate was 4.1% and the rental vacancy rate was 17.6%.

Racial composition as of the 2020 census
Race	Number	Percent
White	802	75.1%
Black or African American	11	1.0%
American Indian and Alaska Native	14	1.3%
Asian	8	0.7%
Native Hawaiian and Other Pacific Islander	0	0.0%
Some other race	137	12.8%
Two or more races	96	9.0%
Hispanic or Latino (of any race)	271	25.4%

=== 2000 census ===
As of the census of 2000, there were 598 people, 247 households, and 162 families residing in the town. The population density was 596.5 inhabitants per square mile (230.3/km^{2}). There were 274 housing units at an average density of 273.3 per square mile (105.5/km^{2}). The racial makeup of the town was 96.32% White, 0.33% African American, 0.17% Native American, 0.84% Asian, 0.84% from other races, and 1.51% from two or more races. Hispanic or Latino of any race were 2.51% of the population.

There were 247 households, out of which 33.6% had children under the age of 18 living with them, 53.8% were married couples living together, 8.9% had a female householder with no husband present, and 34.4% were non-families. 30.8% of all households were made up of individuals, and 15.4% had someone living alone who was 65 years of age or older. The average household size was 2.42 and the average family size was 3.06.

In the town, the population was spread out, with 28.4% under the age of 18, 8.2% from 18 to 24, 28.1% from 25 to 44, 19.2% from 45 to 64, and 16.1% who were 65 years of age or older. The median age was 35 years. For every 100 females, there were 105.5 males. For every 100 females age 18 and over, there were 99.1 males.

The median income for a household in the town was $30,481, and the median income for a family was $35,357. Males had a median income of $31,324 versus $21,750 for females. The per capita income for the town was $16,000. About 3.0% of families and 5.5% of the population were below the poverty line, including 1.9% of those under age 18 and 6.4% of those age 65 or over.

== Education ==
Deer Trail is served by Deer Trail School District 26J. Deer Trail School District 26J has one elementary school, one middle school and one high school. The three schools are Deer Trail Elementary School, Deer Trail Middle School and Deer Trail High School. The school mascot is the Eagles.

== See also ==
- Denver-Aurora-Greeley, CO Combined Statistical Area
