= Capital Beltway (disambiguation) =

The Capital Beltway is the popular name for Interstate 495, the beltway around Washington, DC. It may also refer to:

- Capital Beltway station, a former train station located near I-495 in Lanham, Maryland
- Capital Beltway (Harrisburg) in Harrisburg, Pennsylvania
- Interstate 285 (Georgia), the beltway around the capital of Georgia; Atlanta
- Interstate 270 (Ohio) around the capital of Ohio; Columbus
- Interstate 465 around the capital of Indiana; Indianapolis
- C-470/E-470/Northwest Parkway forms the beltway around the capital of Colorado; Denver
- Interstate 540 (North Carolina)/North Carolina Highway 540 forms the partially completed loop around the capital of North Carolina; Raleigh

== See also ==
- Capitol Loop
- Ring Road
