= Colorado State Highway 177 =

State highway in Colorado, United States

State Highway 177
- S. University Blvd.
- SH 177 highlighted in red

Route information
- Maintained by CDOT
- Length: 6.111 mi (9.835 km)

Major junctions
- South end: SH 470 in Highlands Ranch
- North end: US 285 in Cherry Hills Village

Location
- Country: United States
- State: Colorado
- Counties: Douglas, Arapahoe

Highway system
- Colorado State Highway System; Interstate; US; State; Scenic
← SH 172	→ SH 183

State Highway 177 (SH 177) is a Colorado state highway in Douglas and Arapahoe counties. SH 177's southern terminus is at SH 470 in Highlands Ranch, and the northern terminus is at U.S. Route 285 (US 285) in Cherry Hills Village.

== Route description ==
SH 177 runs 6.1 miles (9.8 km), starting at an interchange with SH 470. The highway, also known as South University Boulevard, runs north through Centennial and Greenwood Village. It crosses SH 88 (Belleview Avenue) and enters Cherry Hills Village, passing Cherry Hills Country Club just before the state highway ends at US 285. The route north continues as South University Boulevard.

== Major intersections ==
County	Location	mi	km	Destinations	Notes
Douglas	Highlands Ranch	0.000	0.000	SH 470	Southern terminus; C-470 exit 21.
Arapahoe	Greenwood Village	2.301	3.703	E Arapahoe Road	
Arapahoe	Greenwood Village	4.117	6.626	SH 88 (Belleview Avenue)	
Arapahoe	Cherry Hills Village	6.111	9.835	US 285 (Hampden Avenue)	Northern terminus
1.000 mi = 1.609 km; 1.000 km = 0.621 mi
