= Colorado State Highway 183 =

State highway in Colorado, United States

State Highway 183

Route information
- Maintained by CDOT
- Length: 1.000 mi (1.609 km)

Major junctions
- South end: CR HH in Fort Lyon
- North end: US 50 east of Las Animas

Location
- Country: United States
- State: Colorado
- Counties: Bent

Highway system
- Colorado State Highway System; Interstate; US; State; Scenic
← SH 177	→ SH 184

State Highway 183 (SH 183) is a highway in Bent County, Colorado. SH 183's southern terminus is at County Route HH (CR HH) near Fort Lyon, and the northern terminus is at U.S. Route 50 (US 50) east of Las Animas.

== Route description ==
SH 183 runs 1 mile (1.6 km), starting at a junction with CR HH near Fort Lyon, which was formerly used as a prison by the Colorado Department of Corrections. The route heads north, ending at a junction with US 50 east of Las Animas.

== Major intersections ==
The entire route is in Bent County.

Location	mi	km	Destinations	Notes
Fort Lyon	0.000	0.000	CR HH / CR 15 / Fort Lyon Road	Southern terminus; access to Fort Lyon
	1.000	1.609	US 50 – Las Animas, Lamar	Northern terminus
1.000 mi = 1.609 km; 1.000 km = 0.621 mi
