= Indian Hills, Colorado =

Census-designated place in Jefferson County, CO, USA

- Census-designated place
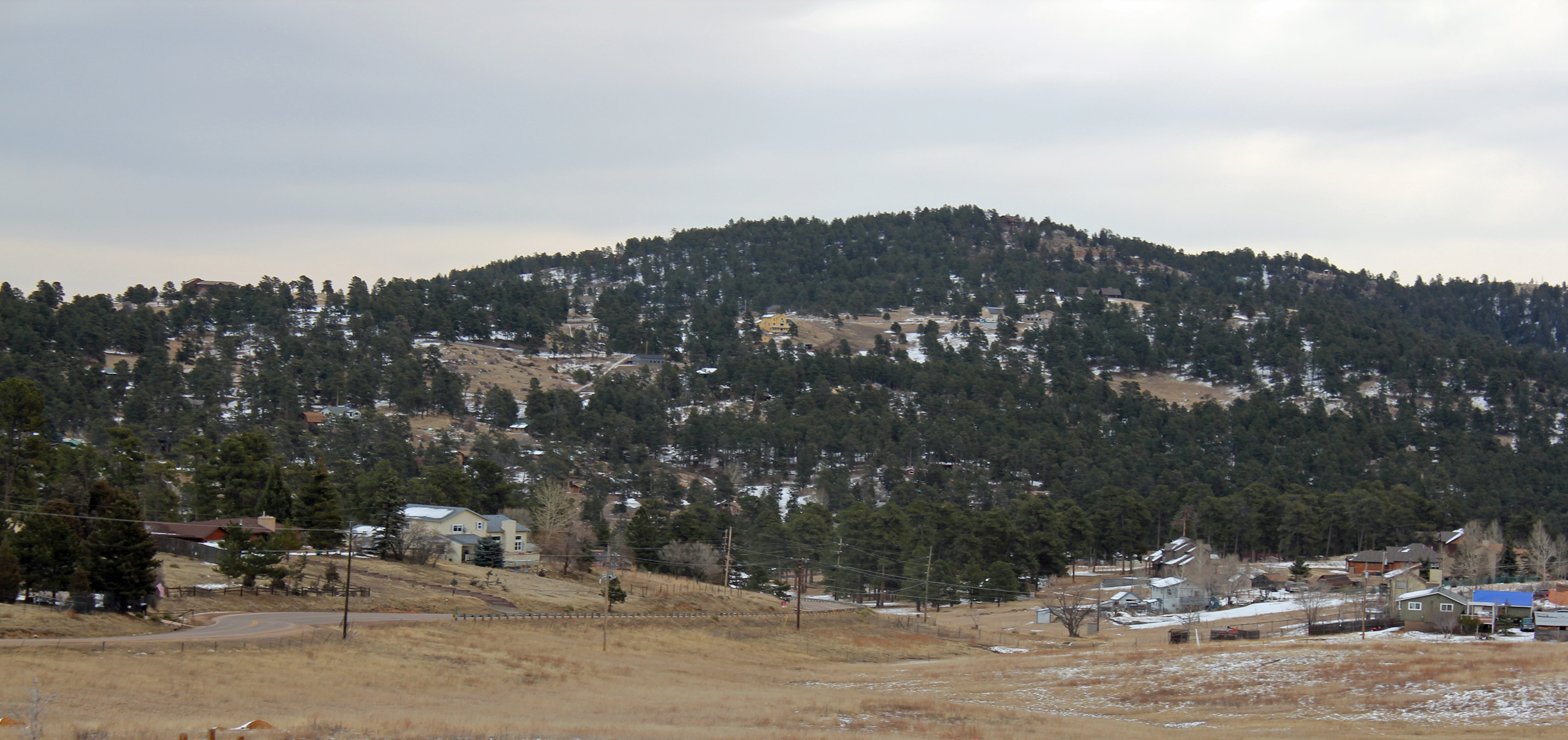
- Indian Hills in 2014.

- Location of the Indian Hills CDP in Jefferson County, Colorado
- Coordinates: 39°37′46″N 105°15′03″W
- Country: United States
- State: Colorado
- County: Jefferson County

Government
  - Type: Unincorporated community

Area
  - Total: 5.429 sq mi (14.060 km^{2})
  - Land: 5.425 sq mi (14.051 km^{2})
  - Water: 0.0035 sq mi (0.009 km^{2})
- Elevation: 7,208 ft (2,197 m)

Population (2020)
  - Total: 1,474
  - Density: 271.7/sq mi (104.9/km^{2})
- Time zone: UTC-7 (MST)
  - Summer (DST): UTC-6 (MDT)
- ZIP Code: 80454
- Area codes: 303 & 720
- GNIS feature ID: 2408420

Indian Hills is an unincorporated town, a post office, and a census-designated place (CDP) located in and governed by Jefferson County, Colorado, United States. The CDP is a part of the Denver–Aurora–Lakewood, CO Metropolitan Statistical Area. The Indian Hills post office has the ZIP code 80454. At the United States Census 2020, the population of the Indian Hills CDP was 1,474.

== History ==
John D. Parmalee (1813–1885) came to Colorado in 1860 and settled in Mount Vernon. In 1866, he was granted a charter for a toll road between Morrison and Bradford Junction (Conifer); the Denver and Turkey Creek Toll Road opened in 1870. Parmalee also operated sawmills and shingle mills in the area. He was later commissioned to build a road from Turkey Creek to Bergen Park, along what is known as Parmalee Gulch.

In 1885, Parmalee sold his interest in the toll road to Benjamin F. Eden (1848–1932), who became tollgate keeper from 1877 to 1883. In 1886, Eden sold the road to Jefferson County. Eden bought properties in the northern end of Parmalee Gulch, which became known as Eden Park. In time he acquired more than 1,000 acres (4.0 km^{2}), attracting the interest of developers. With the Panic of 1893 and crash in silver prices, the development foundered and Eden recovered the property. He continued to farm the area, raising cattle, horses, hay, and potatoes.

George W. Olinger, son of mortuary founders John and Emma Olinger, became interested in the area in 1918, and purchased the Eden property in 1921. Olinger planned a development to be called "Indian Hills," and built a golf course on part of Eden's land. The first filing was recorded at Jefferson County in June 1923, making Indian Hills the community's official name. Filings were named to recall the association with original inhabitants: Arrowhead Park, Ute & Cherokee Village, and Shawnee Village. "Eden Park" became the fifth filing of Olinger's development, and was platted in 1926. Models of summer cabins were built of logs, and small lots were sold to Denver residents seeking summer homes in the mountains.

== Geography ==
Indian Hills extends along the Parmalee Gulch and Myers Gulch Roads between State Highway 74 at Kittredge, Colorado, and U.S. Highway 285 at Turkey Creek.

The Indian Hills CDP has an area of 3,474 acres (14.060 km^{2}), including 2.2 acres (0.009 km^{2}) of water.

== Demographics ==
The United States Census Bureau initially defined the Indian Hills CDP for the United States Census 2000.

Indian Hills CDP, Colorado
Year	Pop.	±%
2000	1,197	—
2010	1,280	+6.9%
2020	1,474	+15.2%
Source: United States Census Bureau

=== 2020 census ===
As of the 2020 census, Indian Hills had a population of 1,474. The median age was 48.7 years. 20.7% of residents were under the age of 18 and 20.6% of residents were 65 years of age or older. For every 100 females there were 116.8 males, and for every 100 females age 18 and over there were 117.3 males age 18 and over.

0.0% of residents lived in urban areas, while 100.0% lived in rural areas.

There were 597 households in Indian Hills, of which 26.1% had children under the age of 18 living in them. Of all households, 62.5% were married-couple households, 19.9% were households with a male householder and no spouse or partner present, and 13.9% were households with a female householder and no spouse or partner present. About 21.4% of all households were made up of individuals and 8.9% had someone living alone who was 65 years of age or older.

There were 640 housing units, of which 6.7% were vacant. The homeowner vacancy rate was 0.0% and the rental vacancy rate was 3.4%.

Racial composition as of the 2020 census
Race	Number	Percent
White	1,339	90.8%
Black or African American	1	0.1%
American Indian and Alaska Native	7	0.5%
Asian	16	1.1%
Native Hawaiian and Other Pacific Islander	0	0.0%
Some other race	30	2.0%
Two or more races	81	5.5%
Hispanic or Latino (of any race)	73	5.0%

== Education ==
Indian Hills is served by the Jefferson County Public Schools. Schools serving Indian Hills include:

- Parmalee Elementary School
- West Jefferson Middle School
- Conifer High School

== Humorous sign ==
The sign at the Indian Hills Community Center features a changing display of humorous wordplays, and has its own Facebook page.

== See also ==
- Front Range Urban Corridor
