= Colorado State Highway 75 =

State highway in Colorado, United States

State Highway 75
- Platte Canyon Road
- SH 75 highlighted in red

Route information
- Maintained by CDOT
- Length: 3.329 mi (5.358 km)

Major junctions
- South end: SH 470 in Columbine
- North end: Bowles Avenue in Littleton

Location
- Country: United States
- State: Colorado
- Counties: Jefferson, Arapahoe

Highway system
- Colorado State Highway System; Interstate; US; State; Scenic
← SH 74	→ SH 78

State Highway 75 (SH 75) is a Colorado state highway in Jefferson and Arapahoe counties. The southern terminus is at SH 470 in Columbine and the northern terminus is at Bowles Avenue in Littleton.

== Route description ==
Over a total of 3.329 miles (5.358 km), SH 75 runs northeast on S. Platte Canyon Road from a partial interchange with SH 470 to an intersection with Lowell Boulevard and Bowles Avenue in Littleton.

== History ==
Formerly, SH 75 continued into Littleton past the Lowell Blvd. intersection by turning east onto Bowles Ave. toward the junction with US 85. Past this junction, SH 75 would traverse a one-way couplet consisting of Alamo Avenue (eastbound) and Main Street (westbound), before the one-way streets merged into Littleton Boulevard. At the Broadway intersection, SH 75 would turn north onto Broadway, where it would enter Englewood and eventually intersect SH 88 (Belleview Avenue). Finally, SH 75 would meet its historic end at US 285 in Englewood.

== Major intersections ==
County	Location	mi	km	Destinations	Notes
Jefferson	Columbine	8.524	13.718	SH 470 west (C-470) / Chatfield Avenue / Kendall Boulevard	Roundabout; southern terminus; no access to or from eastbound SH 470
Arapahoe	Littleton	5.287	8.509	Bowles Avenue	Northern terminus; road continues as Lowell Boulevard
1.000 mi = 1.609 km; 1.000 km = 0.621 mi
