= Colorado State Highway 8 =

State highway in Colorado

State Highway 8
- SH 8 highlighted in red

Route information
- Maintained by CDOT
- Length: 8.683 mi (13.974 km)

Major junctions
- West end: US 285 in Morrison
- East end: SH 121 in Lakewood

Location
- Country: United States
- State: Colorado
- Counties: Jefferson

Highway system
- Colorado State Highway System; Interstate; US; State; Scenic
← SH 7	→ SH 9

State Highway 8 (SH 8) is an 8.68-mile (13.97 km) long state highway in the U.S. state of Colorado. SH 8's western terminus is at U.S. Route 285 (US 285) in Morrison, and the eastern terminus is at SH 121 in Lakewood.

== Route description ==
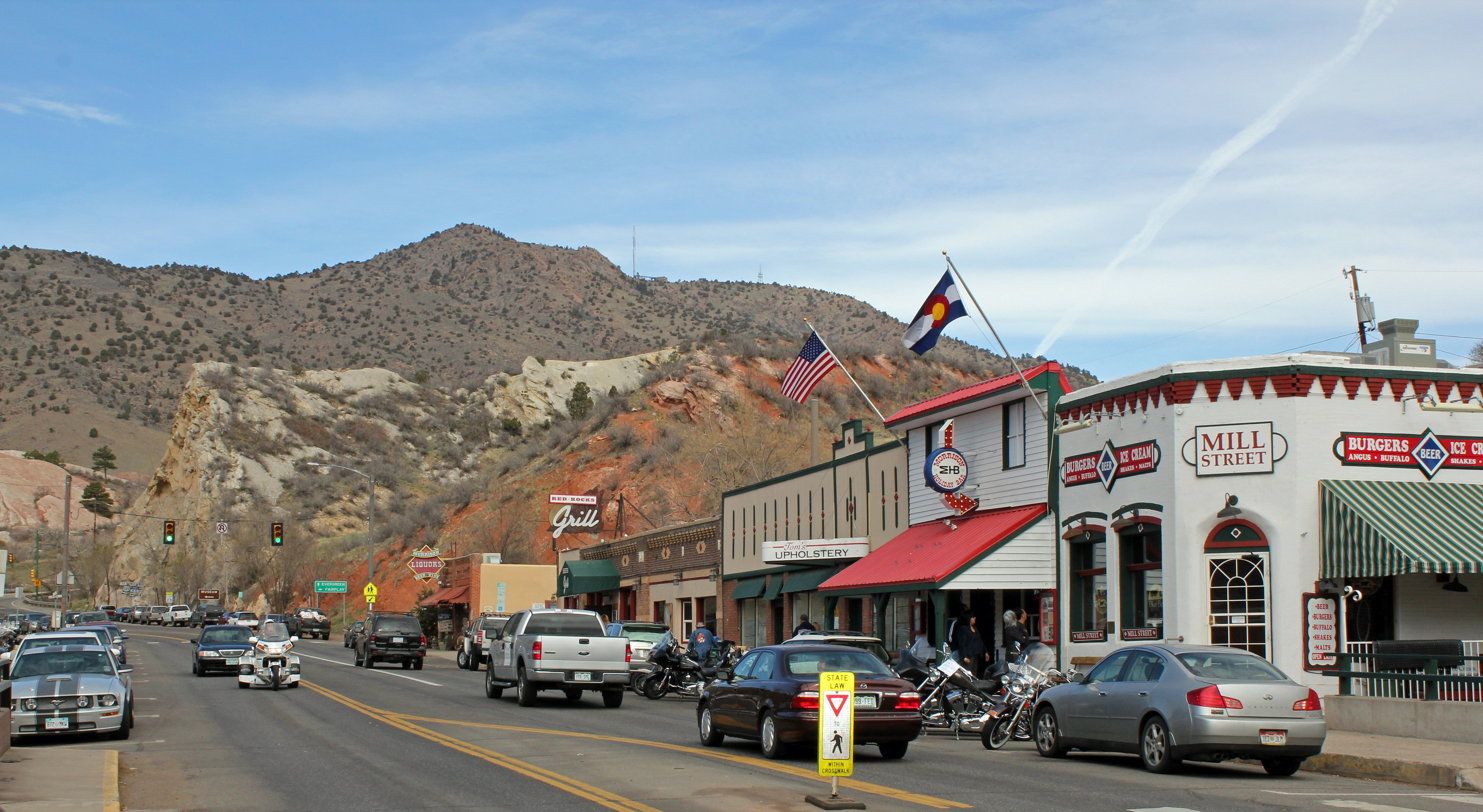
SH 8 in Morrison

From its western terminus at the interchange with the U.S. Highway 285 freeway, SH 8 runs north in the town of Morrison, then east on Morrison Road to its eastern terminus at State Highway 121, also known as Wadsworth Boulevard, in Lakewood. SH 8 becomes an 55 mph expressway between SH470 and Kipling street as it passes Bear Creek Lake Park. (SH391) The entire length of this highway is a little less than nine miles (14 km), all within the western suburbs of Denver and entirely within Jefferson County. No part of SH 8 is a freeway.

Within the town of Morrison is a road junction with State Highway 74, also known as Bear Creek Canyon Road, westbound to Evergreen. East of Morrison is an interchange with the SH 470 freeway. East of SH 470 and west of Wadsworth Boulevard is an intersection with State Highway 391 (South Kipling Parkway).

== Major intersections ==
The entire route is in Jefferson County.

Location	mi	km	Destinations	Notes
Morrison	0.000	0.000	US 285 – Fairplay, Denver	Western terminus; trumpet interchange
Morrison	2.149	3.458	SH 74 west – Evergreen	Eastern terminus of SH 74
	2.883	4.640	SH 470	C-470 exit 4; Single-point urban interchange
Lakewood	6.913	11.125	SH 391 (Kipling Parkway)	
Lakewood	8.683	13.974	SH 121 (Wadsworth Boulevard)	Eastern terminus
1.000 mi = 1.609 km; 1.000 km = 0.621 mi
