= Colorado State Highway 74 =

State highway in Colorado, United States

State Highway 74
- SH 74 marked in red

Route information
- Maintained by CDOT
- Length: 18.110 mi (29.145 km)
- Existed: 1923–present

Major junctions
- West end: I-70 at El Rancho
- US 40 at El Rancho
- East end: SH 8 at Morrison

Location
- Country: United States
- State: Colorado
- Counties: Jefferson

Highway system
- Colorado State Highway System; Interstate; US; State; Scenic
← SH 72	→ SH 75

State Highway 74 (SH 74) is a state highway in the U.S. state of Colorado. Running 18 miles (29 km) from Interstate 70 (I-70) in El Rancho to SH 8 in Morrison, the highway roughly follows a hook-shaped path running northwest–southeast. The section of the route north of the town of Evergreen is known as Evergreen Parkway and is a segment with a four- to six-lane roadway, with the section east of Evergreen mostly two lanes. The other section is known as the Bear Creek Canyon Scenic Mountain Drive, or just Bear Creek Road, and primarily parallels Bear Creek, passing through the towns of Kittredge and Idledale. The route, which is on the outskirts of Denver, passes through several of the city's mountain parks, including Bergen, Dedisse and Red Rocks parks.

An early road following the current path was established in the late 19th century for miners and loggers. As floods ravaged the road along Bear Creek through the early 20th century, measures were taken to prevent further damage. Other sites along Bear Creek, such as a Civilian Conservation Corps (CCC) camp in Red Rocks Park and the Bear Creek Canyon Scenic Mountain Drive, as the section between Idledale and Morrison is called, have given the route a listing on the National Register of Historic Places. An early designation of the route number went further west than its current-day designation; that section was truncated by the late 1930s. Another eastern segment was added from Morrison east toward Denver in the 1940s, but that section too was removed. Newer improvements to the road include widening the Evergreen Parkway segment to four lanes and constructing an interchange with I-70.

== Route description ==
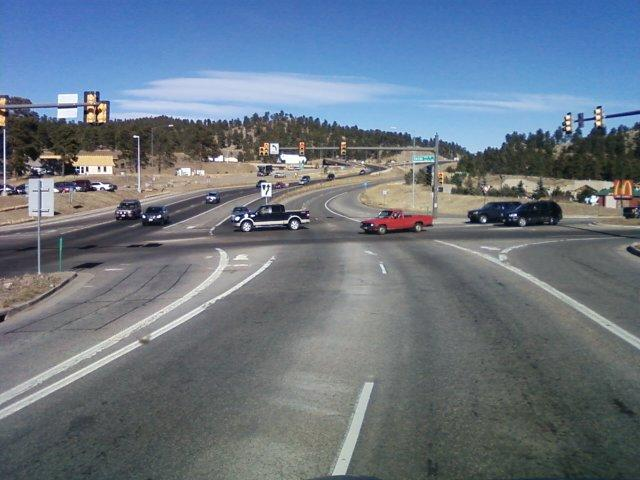
SH 74 intersection with US 40 (Swede Gulch Road) in El Rancho

SH 74 begins at an interchange with I-70 in El Rancho. Ramps from I-70 westbound branch off the freeway's exit 252 from the north side and cross the highway southwestward. Access to SH 74 from I-70 eastbound is provided via U.S. Highway 40 (US 40) a slight distance to the west. From I-70, the roadway heads southwesterly through El Rancho, meeting an intersection with US 40 (Swede Gulch Road). The route heads westward before turning southwestward into a coniferous forest setting as a four-lane divided highway. The roadway turns westward where it meets County Road 23 (Kerr Gulch Road). Evergreen Parkway passes Fillius Park to the north in the community of Hidden Valley, where the terrain is mountainous. After intersecting Bergen Parkway, which heads southwesterly toward Bergen Park, SH 74 turns to the south. The parkway meets Mestaa'ėhehe Road and crosses the Troublesome Creek before traveling along the west side of Buchanan Park. SH 74 follows the east side of Elk Meadow Open Space Park, where open grassland is dotted with occasional trees. The road climbs steeply at milepost five. While passing Wah Keeney Park, the road turns southeastward and narrows to two lanes approaching milepost seven. SH 74 enters the town of Evergreen, passing by a lake of the same name along Bear Creek in Dedisse Park and meeting CR 74 (Upper Bear Creek Road), which heads west along the Upper Bear Creek, before meeting CR 73 at an intersection below the lake.

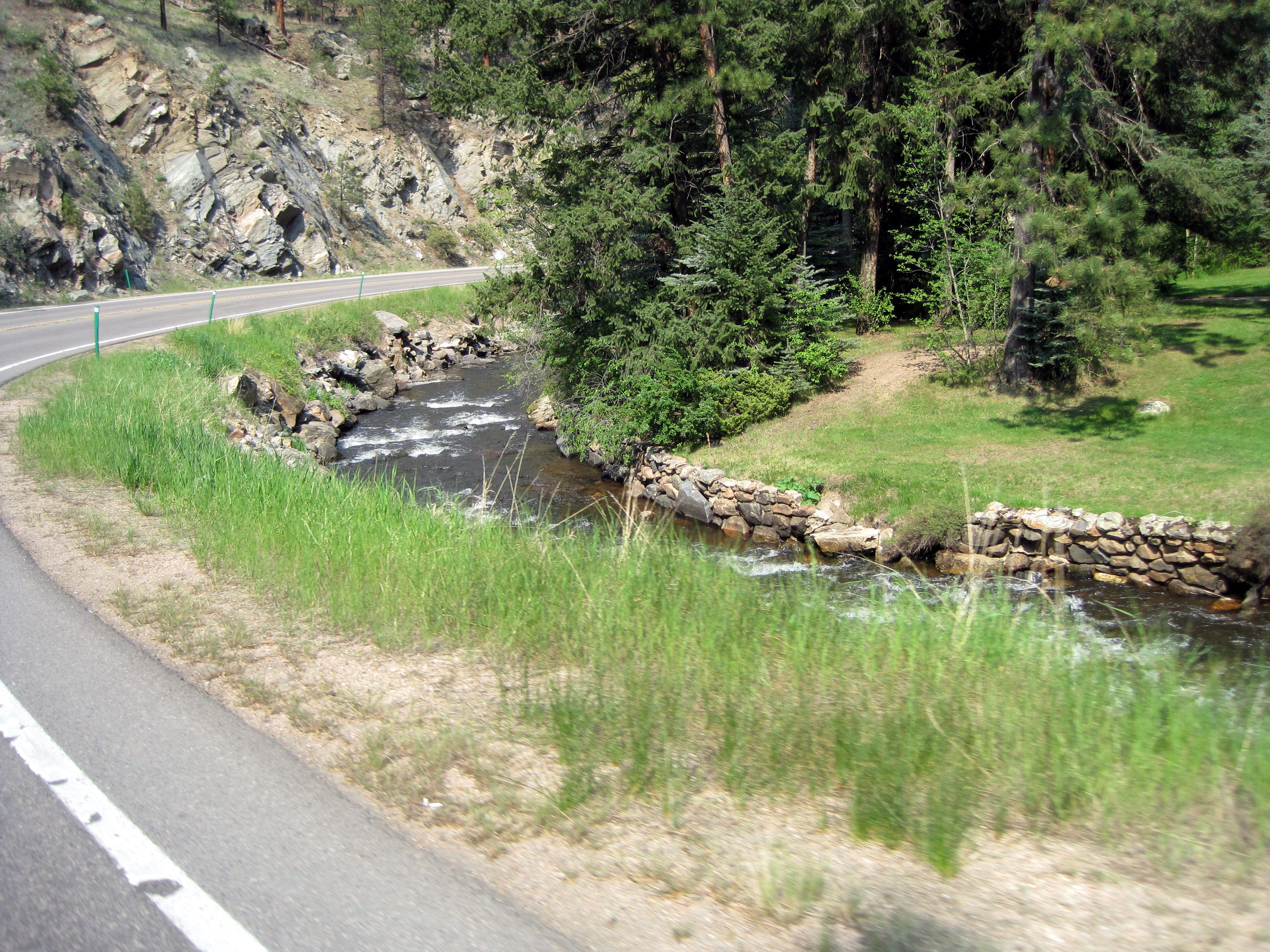
SH 74 winding along Bear Creek in Idledale

SH 74, now known as Bear Creek Road, curves east- and northward as it winds out of town. Narrowing to two lanes, the route follows the path of Bear Creek, curving northeasterly toward Kittredge with Pence Park on the east side. In Kittredge, the route meets CR 120 (Myers Gulch Road), which heads southeast toward Indian Hills. The route again meets Kerr Gulch Road, which bypasses the large curve which SH 74 took. From Kittredge, SH 74 winds eastward on the north side of Bear Creek. The roadway passes Idledale north of the Lair O the Bear Park, where it intersects Grapevine Road. East of the town, an abandoned section of SH 74 exists, which now serves as a path to private areas. The route heads into Bear Creek Canyon Park, where it curves along the creek in a more rocky terrain. SH 74 also passes through Red Rocks Park along the stream. Exiting the park, SH 74 enters Morrison, where Bear Creek Road meets SH 8 at an intersection. From here, SH 8 (Morrison Road) serves as the continuation of the road toward Denver.

The route is maintained by the Colorado Department of Transportation (CDOT), who is responsible for maintaining and constructing transportation infrastructure in Colorado, including highways. As part of this role, CDOT periodically conducts surveys on their highways to measure traffic volume. This is expressed in terms of average annual daily traffic (AADT), which is a measure of the average daily traffic volume on a particular road. In 2009, CDOT calculated that as few as 3,200 vehicles used SH 74 daily near Idledale, and as many as 23,000 vehicles used SH 74 near the interchange with I-70 as well in Evergreen.

== History ==
- Bear Creek Canyon Scenic Mountain Drive
- U.S. National Register of Historic Places
- U.S. Historic district
- Nearest city: Morrison, Colorado
- Area: 688 acres (2.78 km^{2})
- Built: 1914
- Architect: Olmsted Bros.; Civilian Conservation Corps
- MPS: Denver Mountain Parks MPS
- NRHP reference No.: 90001706
- Added to NRHP: November 15, 1990

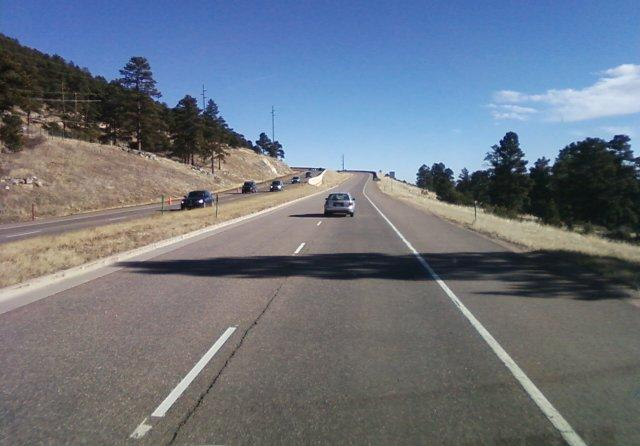
SH 74 heading westward north of Bergen Park

In 1873, John Evans, then a former governor of the Colorado Territory, constructed a toll road from Evergreen to Morrison via Bear Creek canyon. The early road offered access to various mining and logging resources along the creek. This road had over twenty bridges over Bear Creek, most of which were made of wood from the surrounding region. By the late 1870s, toll roads were no longer common, and the path's maintenance responsibilities were passed to Jefferson County.

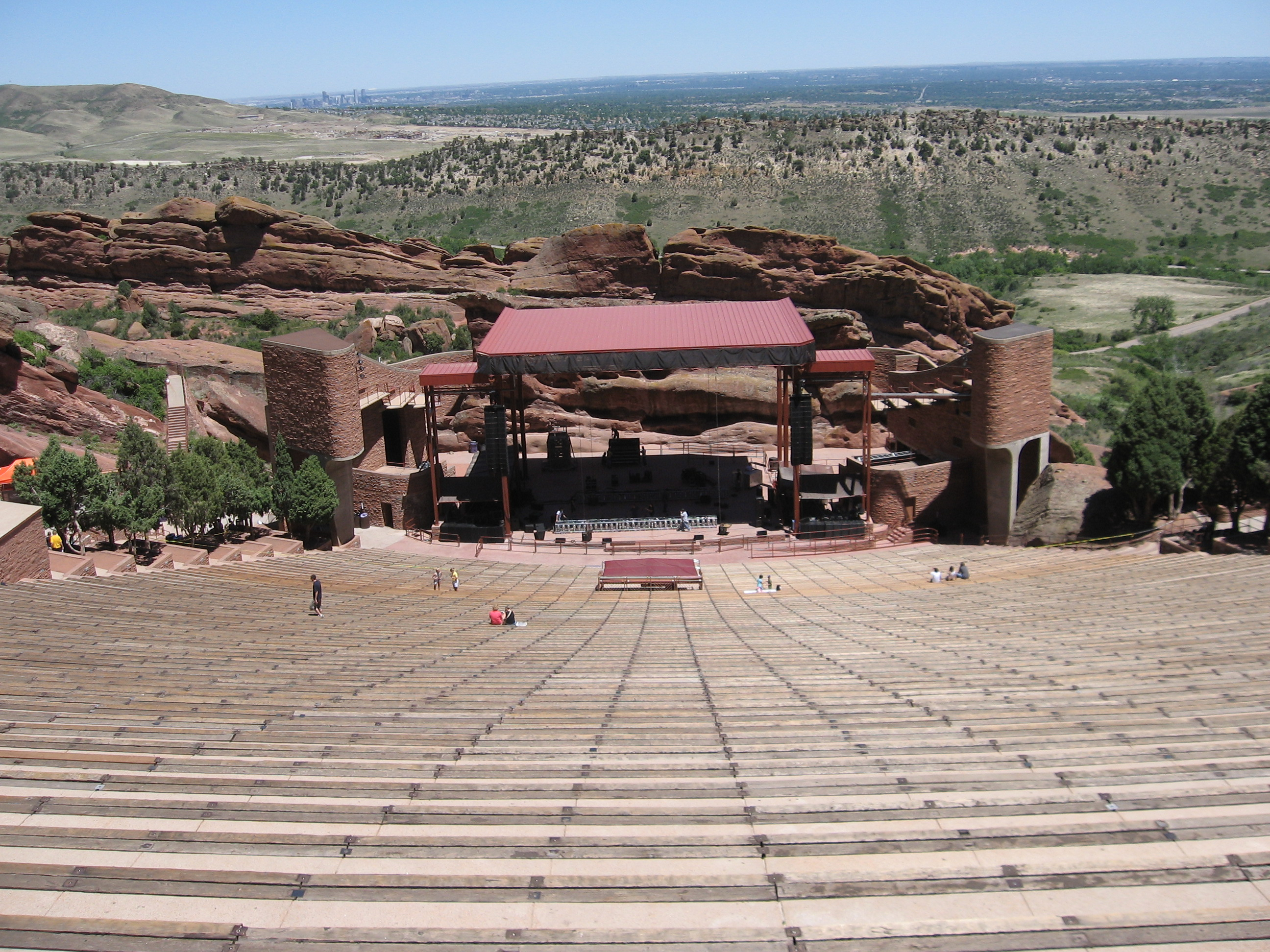
Open-air amphitheater built by the CCC

SH 74 passes through many of Denver's mountain parks, including Bergen Park and Dedisse Park. Established in 1909 by Colorado governor Robert W. Speer, the system encompassed several areas west of the city, comprising the first city-owned park system in the world. SH 27, as the Bear Creek Canyon Scenic Mountain Drive was designated at the time, ran past the Denver Motor Club in Idledale in addition to newly purchased parks. During the 1910s, Denver was granted the ability to enforce laws pertaining to these parks; a speed limit of 20 miles per hour (32 km/h) was set along the roadway uphill and 15 miles per hour (24 km/h) downhill. In one of the parks, Red Rocks Park near Morrison, a CCC camp was established in 1935 as part of a New Deal work relief program. The enlistees here built a large amphitheater in the park. Numbered camp SP-13-C, it is the only CCC camp left in the state. Both the camp and the section of SH 74 between Idledale and Morrison, known as the Bear Creek Canyon Scenic Mountain Drive, are listed on the National Register of Historic Places.

Bear Creek was especially prone to flooding, as was seen in 1896 when Morrison was almost destroyed. On occasion, sightseers along the road were threatened by floods, such as one in 1925 where cars on the road were carried into the river. To control flooding along the creek and therefore preserve safety along the road, the Denver manager of parks sought to build a dam near Evergreen. The dam, finished three years after the flood, created Evergreen Lake. Following a September 1938 flood, crews from a federal work program built walls along the side of the creek, measuring from 7 to 34 feet (2.1 to 10.4 m) high. The Works Progress Administration (WPA), as this program was called, installed over 4,500 feet (1,400 m) of masonry from Morrison to Idledale at points where previous floods had damaged the roadway.

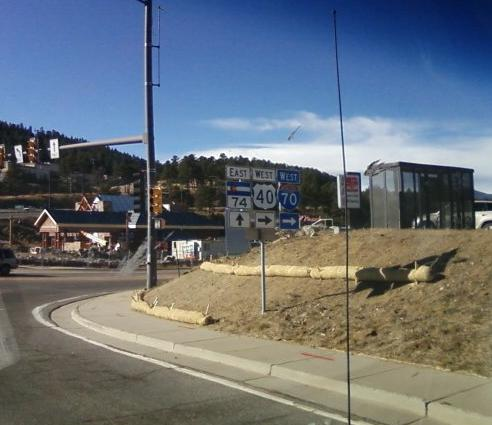
Signs showing directions to various routes from a junction along SH 74 in El Rancho

From 1923 through the early 1930s, the SH 74 designation was from Echo Lake at what is now an intersection between SH 103 and SH 5 east along Mestaa'ėhehe Road to Bergen Park. From here, it followed its current designation to Morrison. SH 74 was paved from Morrison to Evergreen using an oil surface resembling asphalt in late 1928. This oil surface, which was approximately 1 inch (25 mm) deep, prevented erosion along the roadway in the Bear Creek canyon during floods. By 1938, the section west of Bergen Park was redesignated as SH 68, and SH 74 was turned northward to US 40. The east end was extended into Denver along Alameda Avenue by 1947. This section terminated at what was then SH 87 in Denver. In 1956, the Colorado State Highway Department opted to realign sections of SH 74 away from Bear Creek. A section of the road between Evergreen and Kittredge was resurfaced and widened the next year. By then, US 285 replaced the eastern segment, and the terminus of the route was cut back to its original and current terminus in Morrison. Construction on I-70 through the region was completed in 1972 and included an interchange at El Rancho at the northwest end of SH 74. During the 1990s, CDOT sought to further upgrade SH 74 from I-70 to Evergreen to an expressway. Work on this project began in 1993 to improve the interchange between Evergreen Parkway and I-70 and widen the roadway to its current state, costing CDOT $8 million.

== Major intersections ==
The entire route is in Jefferson County.

Location	mi	km	Destinations	Notes
El Rancho	0.000	0.000	I-70 east / US 40 east – Denver	Western terminus; exit 252 on I-70
El Rancho	0.374	0.602	US 40 west to I-70 west – Idaho Springs	
Evergreen	2.434	3.917	CR 65	
Evergreen	2.88	4.63	CR 66	Jefferson CR 66 goes west to Clear Creek CR 103, later turning into SH 103 to continue into Idaho Springs.
Evergreen	7.477	12.033	CR 73 south to US 285	
Morrison	18.110	29.145	SH 8 to US 285	Eastern terminus
1.000 mi = 1.609 km; 1.000 km = 0.621 mi

== Works cited ==
- Associated Cultural Resource Experts. Highways to the Sky: A Context and History of Colorado's Highway System (PDF). Colorado Department of Transportation.
- Colorado Historical Society (March 1992). Colorado State Roads and Highways (PDF). National Park Service. Archived from the original (PDF) on October 1, 2015.
