= Colorado State Highway 128 =

State highway in Colorado, United States

State Highway 128
- SH 128 highlighted in red

Route information
- Maintained by CDOT
- Length: 10.0 mi (16.1 km)

Major junctions
- West end: SH 93 south of Boulder
- SH 121 in Broomfield; US 287 in Broomfield
- East end: I-25 / US 87 in Westminster

Location
- Country: United States
- State: Colorado
- Counties: Boulder, Broomfield, Adams

Highway system
- Colorado State Highway System; Interstate; US; State; Scenic
← SH 127	→ SH 131

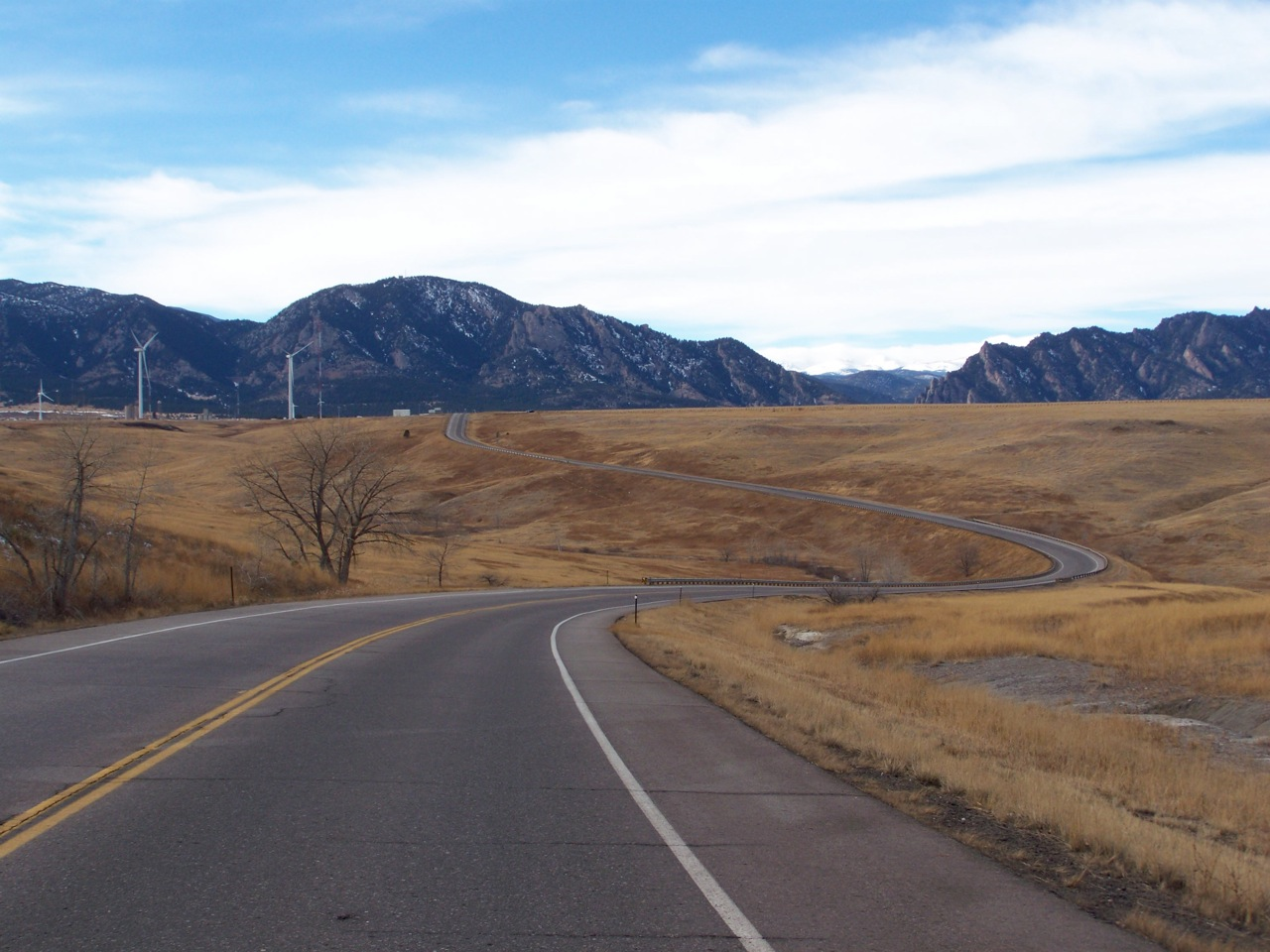
Going west on SH 128

State Highway 128 (SH 128) is a 10 mi (16.1 km) long state highway in the Denver, Colorado metro area. SH 128's western terminus is at SH 93 south of Boulder, and the eastern terminus is at Interstate 25 (I-25) in Westminster.

== Route description ==
The route begins in the west at a junction with SH 93 roughly thirteen miles south of Boulder. From there, the road proceeds eastward into the northern portions of the Denver metropolitan area. The road passes through portions of the cities of Superior, Broomfield, Northglenn, and Westminster and crosses SH 121 before being split by a 3.8 mi (6.1 km) section of concurrency with U.S. Route 287 (US 287) and again resuming its course towards its eastern terminus at exit 223 of I-25 in the city limits of Westminster.

A brief gap between the junction of SH 128 and SH 121 and the junction of SH 121 and US 287 was closed with the construction of a bridge over US 36 to SH 121. This connector began construction in 2009 and finished in 2018, at a cost of $90.1 million. There was a five-year hiatus in construction from 2010 to 2015 during negotiations with BNSF. Following the completion of construction, the total end-to-end length, including the section that is nominally concurrent with US 287, is 14 mi (22.5 km).

== History ==
The route was established in the early 1920s, when it began at Federal Boulevard and ended at SH 185 (now deleted). A section from US 85 to US 6 was added by 1939 and deleted by 1949. The west terminus was extended from US 36 to Indiana Street in 1965 and to its current terminus at SH 93 two years later.

== Major intersections ==
County	Location	mi	km	Destinations	Notes
Boulder		0.000	0.000	SH 93 – Arvada, Boulder	Western terminus
Jefferson	No major junctions				
City and County of Broomfield		7.973	12.831	SH 121 (Wadsworth Parkway) to US 36 / US 287	
City and County of Broomfield		8.970	14.436	US 287 north	Western end of US 287 overlap
City and County of Broomfield		12.168	19.582	US 287 south (Federal Boulevard)	Eastern end of US 287 overlap
Adams	Thornton	14.113	22.713	I-25 (US 87)	Eastern terminus; exit 223 on I-25; road continues as 120th Avenue
1.000 mi = 1.609 km; 1.000 km = 0.621 mi

== Notes ==
a: The 3.8 mi (6.1 km) long section of concurrency with US 287 is not maintained with state funds and therefore not considered to be part of SH 128 by the Colorado Department of Transportation.
