= Idledale, Colorado =

Census-designated place in Jefferson County, CO, USA

- Census-designated place
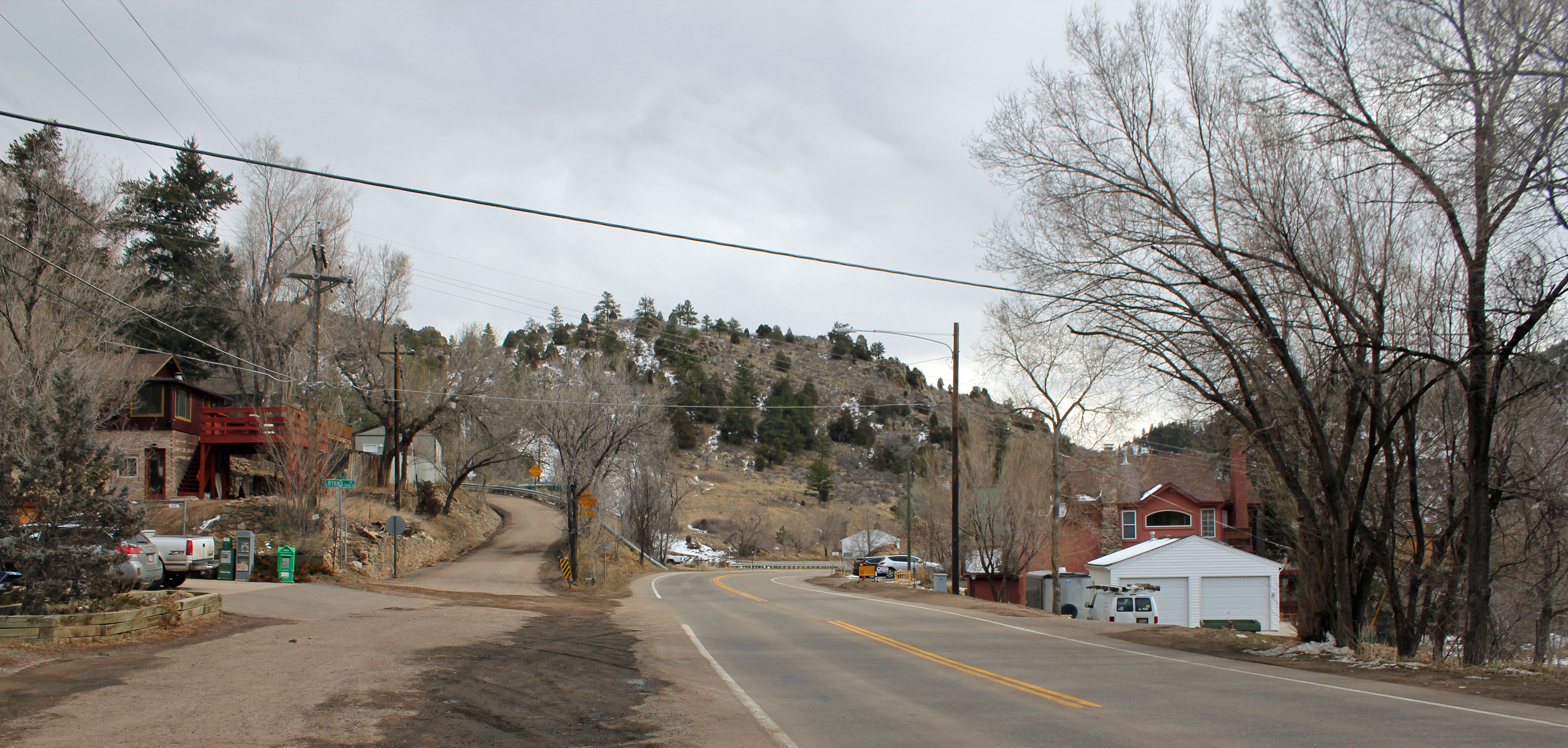
- Idledale in 2014

- Location of the Idledale CDP in Jefferson County, Colorado
- Coordinates: 39°40′08″N 105°14′35″W
- Country: United States
- State: Colorado
- County: Jefferson County

Government
  - Type: Unincorporated community

Area
  - Total: 0.277 sq mi (0.717 km^{2})
  - Land: 0.277 sq mi (0.717 km^{2})
  - Water: 0 sq mi (0.000 km^{2})
- Elevation: 6,598 ft (2,011 m)

Population (2020)
  - Total: 244
  - Density: 881/sq mi (340/km^{2})
- Time zone: UTC-7 (MST)
  - Summer (DST): UTC-6 (MDT)
- ZIP Code: 80453
- Area codes: 303 & 720
- GNIS feature ID: 2583250

Idledale is an unincorporated town, a post office, and a census-designated place (CDP) located in and governed by Jefferson County, Colorado, United States. The CDP is a part of the Denver–Aurora–Lakewood, CO Metropolitan Statistical Area. The Idledale post office has the ZIP code 80453. At the United States Census 2020, the population of the Idledale CDP was 244.

== History ==
Originally called "Starbuck Heights", the town was almost washed out by a storm in 1933. When it was rebuilt, the town became known as Idledale.

== Geography ==
Idledale is located on the north side of Bear Creek. Colorado State Highway 74 passes through the community as it traverses Bear Creek Canyon; to the east, the highway is known as Bear Creek Canyon Scenic Mountain Drive and leads downstream 4 miles (6 km) to Morrison; to the west the highway leads up the canyon the same distance to Kittredge.

The Idledale CDP has an area of 177 acres (0.717 km^{2}), all land.

== Demographics ==
The United States Census Bureau initially defined the Idledale CDP for the United States Census 2010.

Idledale CDP, Colorado
Year	Pop.	±%
2010	252	—
2020	244	−3.2%
Source: United States Census Bureau

== Education ==
Idledale is served by the Jefferson County Public Schools.

== See also ==
- Front Range Urban Corridor
