= E470 (disambiguation) =

E470 may refer to:

- E-470, a limited-access tollway in Colorado

== Food additives ==
- E470a, the E number for the sodium, potassium or calcium salts of fatty acids
- E470b, the E number for magnesium salts of fatty acids
