= Colorado State Highway 121 =

State highway in Colorado, United States

State Highway 121
- Wadsworth Blvd
- SH 121 highlighted in red

Route information
- Maintained by CDOT
- Length: 30.425 mi (48.964 km)

Major junctions
- South end: Lockheed Martin Space Systems near Roxborough Park
- SH 470 near Lakewood; US 285 in Lakewood; US 6 in Lakewood; US 40 / I-70 BL in Lakewood; I-70 / I-76 in Arvada; US 36 in Broomfield
- North end: US 287 in Broomfield

Location
- Country: United States
- State: Colorado
- Counties: Jefferson, Denver, Broomfield

Highway system
- Colorado State Highway System; Interstate; US; State; Scenic
← SH 120	→ SH 125

State Highway 121 (SH 121) also known as Wadsworth Boulevard across its entire length, is a 30.425 mile (48.96 km) long state highway in the U.S. state of Colorado. SH 121's southern terminus is at Waterton Road near Littleton, and the northern terminus is at U.S. Route 287 (US 287) in Broomfield.

== Route description ==
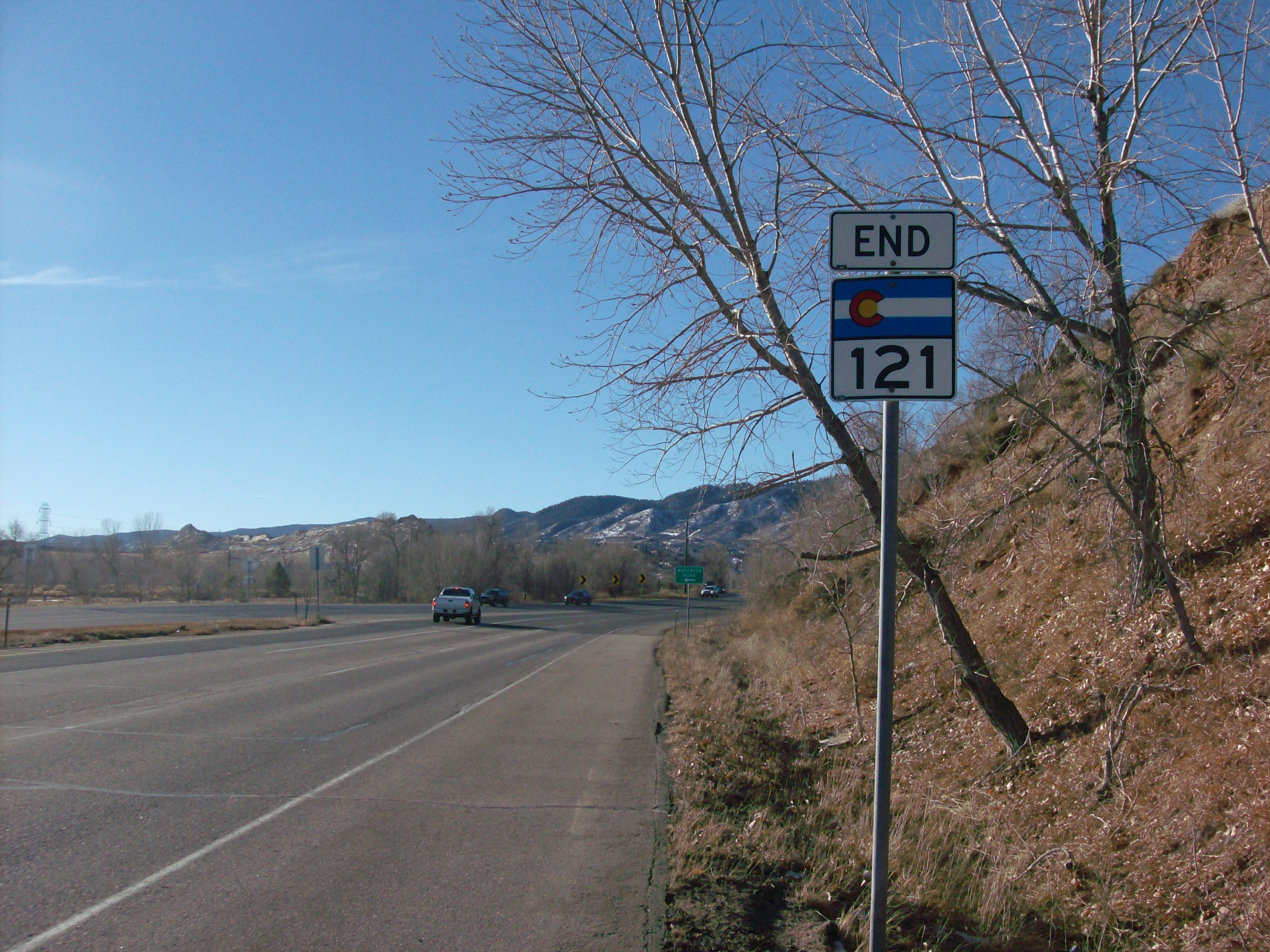
End of SH 121 just before Waterton Road

The route, also known as Wadsworth Boulevard, Wadsworth Bypass, and Wadsworth Parkway, starts at a junction with Waterton Road in unincorporated Jefferson County (near Littleton and at the entrance to the main plant of Lockheed Martin Space Systems) and ends at the junction of U.S. Route 36, U.S. Route 287, and State Highway 128 in Broomfield at a trumpet interchange. State Highway 121 passes through portions of southwest Denver County.

== History ==
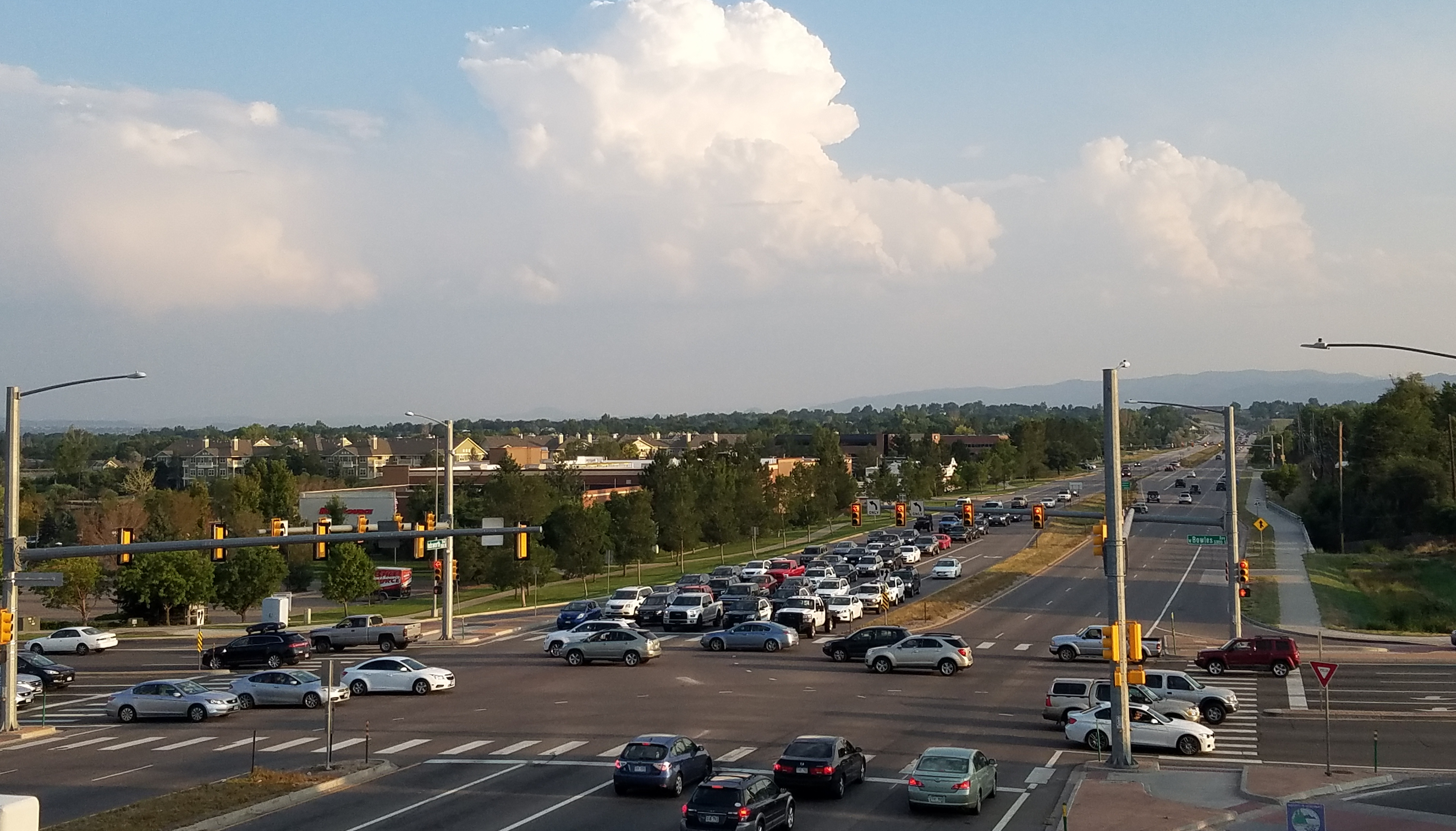
Wadsworth Boulevard (Colorado Highway 121) at Bowles Ave. in Littleton, Colorado.

The name Wadsworth comes from Benjamin Franklin Wadsworth, one of the founders and first postmaster of Arvada. In northwest Arvada, Wadsworth Boulevard passes over Hackberry Hill at the site where a landmark hackberry tree, for which the hill was named, stood before it was cut down to make room for the highway in 1937.

== Major intersections ==
County	Location	mi	km	Destinations	Notes
Jefferson		0.00	0.00	Lockheed Martin Space Systems entrance	Southern terminus
Jefferson		4.41	7.10	SH 470 (C-470)	Interchange; SH 470 exit 13
Denver	No major junctions				
Jefferson	Lakewood	7.49	12.05	US 285 (Hampden Avenue)	Interchange
Jefferson	Lakewood	9.06	14.58	SH 8 west (Morrison Road)	Eastern terminus of SH-8
Jefferson	Lakewood	12.44	20.02	US 6 (Sixth Avenue)	Interchange
Jefferson	Lakewood	13.59	21.87	US 40 / I-70 BL (Colfax Avenue)	
Jefferson	Arvada	16.79	27.02	I-70 / I-76 east – Denver, Fort Morgan, Grand Junction	I-76 exit 1A; I-70 exit 269A
City and County of Broomfield		25.82	41.55	SH 128 (Interlocken Loop)	
City and County of Broomfield		26.02	41.88	US 36 – Denver, Boulder	Interchange
City and County of Broomfield		26.42	42.52	US 287	Interchange; northern terminus; road continues north as US 287
1.000 mi = 1.609 km; 1.000 km = 0.621 mi: Concurrency terminus; Incomplete access
