= Hackberry Hill =

Hill in Arvada, Colorado

Coordinates: 39°49′37″N 105°4′53″W

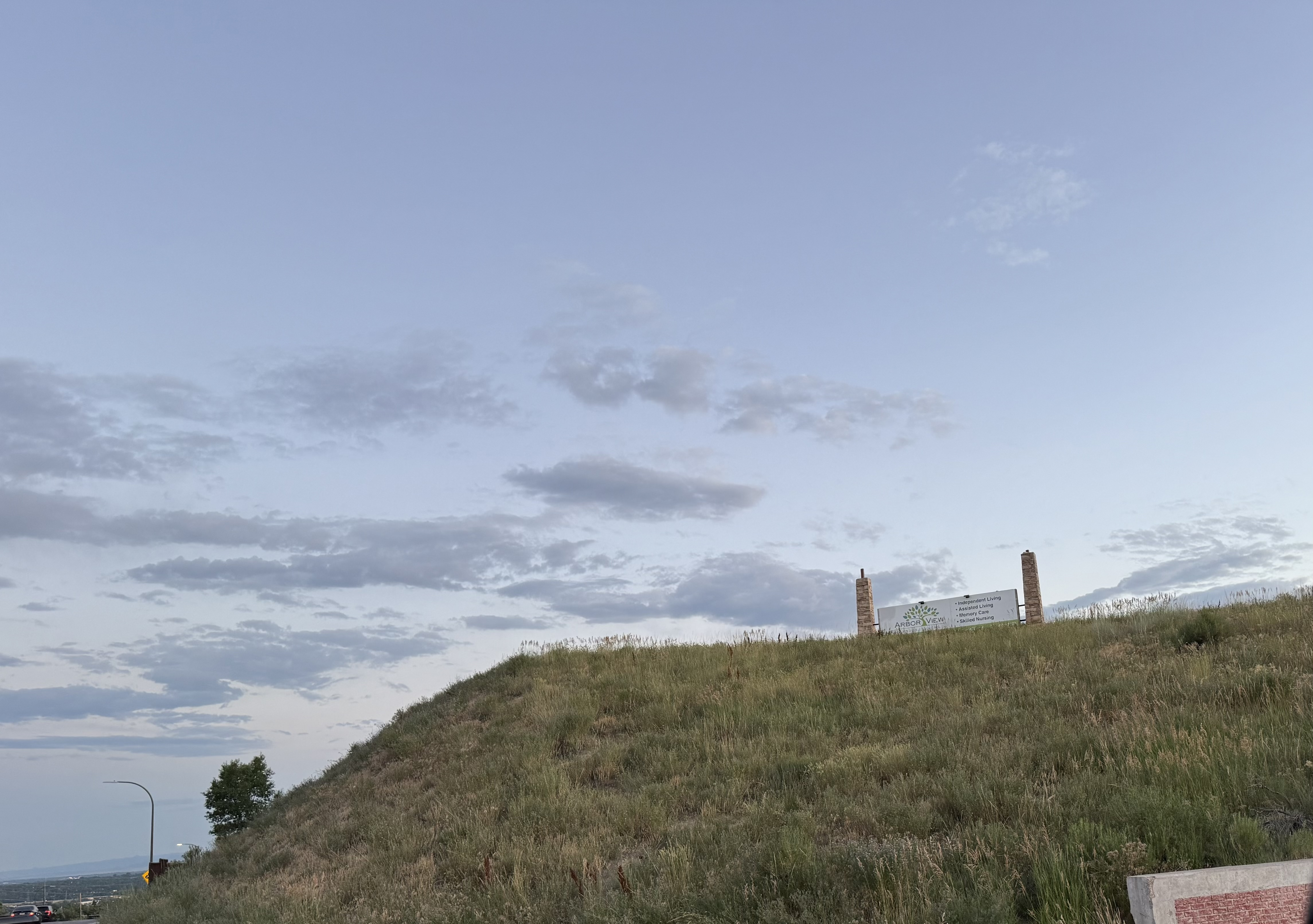
Hackberry Hill on a summer evening

Hackberry Hill is a hill in northeast Arvada, Colorado between the Ralston Creek and Little Dry Creek watersheds.

== History ==
The top of this hill was the site of a lone hackberry tree which served as a landmark to early explorers and settlers of region. The tree was unusual, both for its location since the only other scattered trees in the area grew next to water, and because hackberry trees were not native to the region. As a result, there were a variety of stories to explain the origin of the tree, including a Native American legend that a great chief had been buried there along with a medicine bag containing hackberry seeds.

In 1936 Colorado planned to extend State Highway 121 over the hill at the location of the hackberry tree. Due to local opposition, plans were made to transplant the tree, and a ditch was dug around the tree in preparation. However, in 1937, the tree was cut down by vandals before it could be moved. Hackberry Hill Elementary School was put near that hill.

In 1966 a roadside park was established to the west of the highway with a new hackberry tree and a sign commemorating the original tree.
