= Colorado State Highway 470 =

State highway in Colorado, United States

State Highway 470
- C-470
- Map of Denver metropolitan area with C-470 in red and E-470 in green

Route information
- Maintained by CDOT
- Length: 27.41 mi (44.11 km)

Major junctions
- West end: US 6 in Golden
- I-70 in Golden; US 285 in Morrison; US 85 in Littleton
- East end: I-25 / US 87 / E-470 in Lone Tree

Location
- Country: United States
- State: Colorado
- Counties: Jefferson, Arapahoe, Douglas

Highway system
- Colorado State Highway System; Interstate; US; State; Scenic
← US 450	→ E-470

State Highway 470 (SH 470, known locally as C-470) is a freeway located in the southwestern portion of the Denver Metro Area. It is also the southwestern portion of the Denver Metro area's beltway. SH 470 begins at US 6 in Golden and heads south interchanging with Interstate 70 and then US 285 outside Morrison. After leaving Morrison, it then heads east passing by Littleton and through Highlands Ranch before interchanging with Interstate 25 in Lone Tree, where the freeway continues as a tollway and where the state highway designation ends.

The highway was originally planned to be a full continuous beltway around Denver and was also proposed to be in the Interstate Highway System and designated as Interstate 470 (I-470) in the 1960s. However, the beltway project was attacked on environmental impact grounds and the interstate beltway was never built. Alternatives to provide faster and easier access to and from Denver for the southwestern suburbs were discussed after plans for a full beltway ceased. As the southwestern suburbs grew in population, a grand parkway known as the Centennial Parkway was proposed and then was later designated as SH 470 after the road was built to freeway standards. The Centennial Freeway, also known as Nat-Chap Blvd. has shoulders that are ideal for cyclists to ride on.

SH 470 is owned and maintained by the Colorado Department of Transportation (CDOT), an agency responsible for building and maintaining state highways, US highways, and Interstate highways across the state of Colorado.

== Route description ==
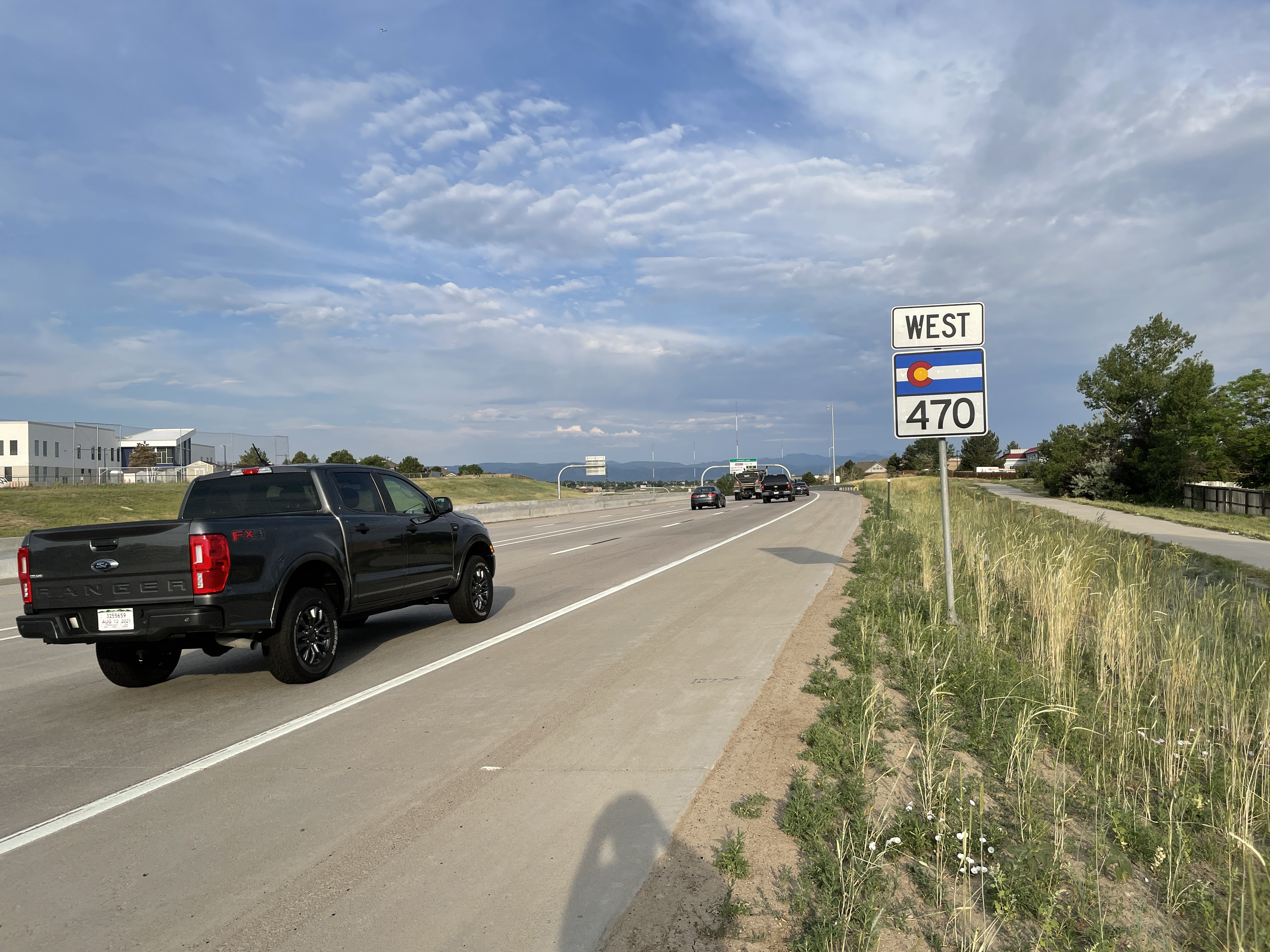
SH 470 westbound in Highlands Ranch

SH 470 begins in Golden as an extension of Johnson Road at an intersection with US 6 (6th Avenue) near the Jefferson County government office complex and its adjacent light rail station. The interchange also includes direct ramps to westbound US 6, which continues northwest towards central Golden and east to Denver. SH 470 travels south from the intersection on a four-lane freeway and passes over US 40 before reaching an interchange with I-70 near Tin Cup Hogback Park. The freeway expands to six lanes and continues south along the side of Green Mountain on the western outskirts of Lakewood. It intersects SH 8 at a single-point urban interchange in Morrison near the Bandimere Speedway complex.

From Morrison, SH 470 begins a gradual turn to the southeast as it passes between Mount Glennon and Bear Creek Lake Park. It intersects US 285, a minor freeway that travels east through Lakewood and west towards Conifer, and continues south with four lanes along the edge of a hogback at the edge of the Denver area's suburban sprawl, served by several exits on the freeway. SH 470 turns east in Ken Caryl near Hildebrand Ranch and intersects SH 121 at the western edge of the Chatfield Reservoir. The freeway turns northeast and dips into Columbine as it skirts the northern edge of the reservoir and its dam before coming to an interchange with US 85. SH 470 gains a parallel multi-use trail for pedestrians and bicycles that follows the freeway as it enters Highlands Ranch in Douglas County. The freeway cuts through the northern edge of Highlands Ranch's residential neighborhoods, intersecting SH 177. SH 470 dips to the south to follow Willow Creek around the Park Meadows shopping mall in Lone Tree, terminating at a stack interchange with I-25. The freeway continues east onto the E-470 tollway, which completes a half-loop around the eastern suburbs of Denver.

== History ==
=== Proposed I-470 ===
Interstate 470
- Location: Full beltway around the Denver Metro Area

In the 1960s the Colorado Department of Transportation perceived a need for a beltway around the Denver Metro Area and sent a proposal to the Federal Highway Administration. The plan was for the federal government to provide 90% of funds for the project with the state providing the difference. I-470 was added to The Federal-Aid Highway Act of 1968 and was to be part of the Interstate Highway and Defense System. The Denver City Council approved the location and began engineering and environmental impact studies. After a few months the studies went under analysis with negative feedback. The Colorado Department of Health was opposed to the interstate beltway on the grounds that it would violate the Federal Clean Air Act. Other studies compared the proposed I-470 to the I-25 and I-225 freeways suggesting that alternate uses for the land (other than freeways) would be more environmentally friendly.

=== Alternatives and construction ===
In response to feedback from the Colorado Department of Health, the governor ordered all efforts to plan and build the beltway to cease. A separate commission was established by Governor Richard Lamm to determine the best course of action. The commission came up with 11 alternatives. The final decision was to use federal highway funds to build a grand parkway known as Centennial Parkway (a partial beltway in the southwest portion of the metro area) and widen existing roads. As the southwestern area grew rapidly, plans for Centennial Parkway evolved to conform to freeway standards. The proposed road was designated State Highway 470. Present-day SH 470 is a freeway that is mostly built to interstate standards. Tolled express lanes along the C-470 portion of the beltway with two westbound toll lanes from Interstate 25 to Colorado Boulevard (no interchange), one westbound toll lane from Colorado Boulevard to State Route 121 (Wadsworth Boulevard), and one eastbound toll lane from just west of the Platte River overpass to Interstate 25 are completed and the state of Colorado began collecting tolls on August 18, 2020.

=== Modern day expansion ===
After the completion of C-470 in the southwest, desires for a full beltway persisted in some circles and plans for an extension were created. CDOT did not wish to participate in the building of the freeway extension and left the counties and cities of the metro area to provide funding for the project. The east, north, and northwest portions of the beltway could be built only as tollways. A tollway extension of SH 470 was built to the junction with State Highway 83 (Parker Road) and termed Eastern/Extension 470 or E-470. Subsequently, E-470 was extended to the interchange with I-70 in the east, and later to I-25 in the north. This newly added tollway was built and continues to be administered by a quasi-governmental organization known as the E-470 Public Highway Authority. When freeway interests pushed for the rest of the beltway to be completed, the city of Golden voted to stop all efforts to finish the beltway due to traffic concerns.

The city and county of Broomfield constructed an 11-mile (18 km) continuation of the E-470 tollway from I-25 to an interchange with US 36 (the Denver-Boulder Turnpike) near Flatiron Crossing Mall. This section of the tollway is known as the Northwest Parkway, and is administered, similarly to E-470, by its own quasi-governmental agency. In conjunction with E-470 (47 miles) and SH 470 (27 miles), the Northwest Parkway brings the total length of the completed portion of the beltway around the Denver Metropolitan Area to approximately 85 miles (137 km). The uncompleted portion, from the west end of the Northwest Parkway to the northwest end of SH 470, is 19 miles (31 km) along existing streets. In 2007, the Portuguese company BRISA paid $603 million to operate the road for the following 99 years, until 2106. The lease included a clause restricting a "Competing Transportation Facility". This clause was invoked in an April 30, 2008 letter when Broomfield wished to make changes to 160th Ave.

In August 2003, CDOT made a compromise with the cities of Westminster, Arvada and Golden to do an environmental impact study, the first step in an attempt to complete the beltway by 2020. The last segment of the beltway would be another tollway, tentatively called W-470, and would connect the west end of the Northwest Parkway to the northwest end of SH 470 but was later rejected and cancelled. The same plans to complete the beltway later reemerged and were to call the last section the Jefferson Parkway which is to begin at the Northwest Parkway and end at the west end of SH 470. Jefferson County, Broomfield and Arvada have formed the Jefferson Parkway Public Highway Authority to construct the freeway. If the 20-mile parkway is constructed, Denver will be completely encircled by a "metropolitan beltway." In February 2020, Broomfield notified Arvada and Jefferson County of plans to exit the Authority. After 12 years of being in the Jefferson Parkway Public Highway Authority, Broomfield opted out after citing an elevated reading of plutonium in the proposed path of the tollway, where the former nuclear weapons manufacturing plant was along the Rocky Flats National Wildlife Refuge. Opposition also grew in Arvada as concerns for excavating decades-old plutonium as well as noise impacts, air and light quality, and debris flying into people's yards from high speed traffic.

== Future ==
When funding becomes available, CDOT plans to reconstruct the freeway-to-freeway interchange between C-470 and US 285, while also making improvements to the freeway between US 285 and SH 8 (Morrison Road). The project plans to improve the interchange by replacing loop ramps with flyovers. The project will also include the addition of an additional general purpose lane in each direction and auxiliary lanes between the US 285 and SH 8 interchanges, and other smaller improvements.

== Exit list ==
County	Location	mi (Note: Not every interval between mileposts is exactly a mile, explaining why more exits than expected are at the exact milepost)	km	Exit	Destinations	Notes
Jefferson	Golden	0.000	0.000		US 6 (6th Avenue) to SH 93 – Boulder	Western terminus
Jefferson	Golden	1.212 0.000	1.951 0.000	1	I-70 – Denver, Grand Junction	No southbound access to I-70 east; exit 260 on I-70; mileposts reset (Note: CDOT recognizes the section from US 6 to I-70 as 470W while road from I-70 to I-25 is inventoried as 470A)
Jefferson		1.842	2.964	2	Alameda Parkway – Dinosaur Ridge	
Jefferson	Morrison	4.248	6.836	4	SH 8 (Morrison Road)	Single-point urban interchange
Jefferson	Lakewood	5.543	8.921		Hampden Avenue	Westbound exit and entrance
Jefferson	Lakewood	5.699	9.172	5	US 285 – Fairplay, Denver	Cloverleaf interchange; signed as exits 5A (southbound) and 5B (northbound)
Jefferson		6.250	10.058	6	Quincy Avenue to Belleview Avenue	
Jefferson		7.901	12.715	7	Bowles Avenue	
Jefferson	Ken Caryl	10.192	16.402	10	Ken Caryl Avenue	
Jefferson	Ken Caryl	12.449	20.035	12	Kipling Parkway	
Jefferson	Ken Caryl	13.902	22.373	14	SH 121 (Wadsworth Boulevard) – Chatfield State Park, Waterton Canyon	
Jefferson	Littleton	15.443	24.853	15	SH 75 north (Platte Canyon Road)	Westbound exit and entrance
Douglas	Highlands Ranch	17.000	27.359	17	US 85 (Santa Fe Drive) – Arapahoe Community College	Full diamond interchange with flyover freeway access ramp from US 85 south to SH-470 east
Douglas	Highlands Ranch	18.458	29.705	18	Kendrick Castillo Way	Named Highlands Ranch Boulevard in original plans, known as Lucent Boulevard from 1997–2024
Douglas	Highlands Ranch	19.599	31.542	19	Broadway	
Douglas	Highlands Ranch	21.069	33.907	21	SH 177 (University Boulevard)	
Douglas	Highlands Ranch–Lone Tree line	24.144	38.856	24	Quebec Street	
Douglas	Lone Tree	25.574	41.157	25	Yosemite Street	Eastbound exit and westbound entrance
Douglas	Lone Tree	26.195	42.157	26	I-25 (US 87) – Colorado Springs, Denver	Exit 194 on I-25; signed as 1A westbound
Douglas	Lone Tree	26.195	42.157		E-470 north – Limon	Continuation north; access to Denver International Airport
1.000 mi = 1.609 km; 1.000 km = 0.621 mi: Incomplete access

== Controversy ==
The completion of the freeway has been mired in controversy. In 1975 Colorado Governor Dick Lamm vowed to "drive a silver spike" through the plans for the road. In 1989, voters turned down an expansion of the freeway by a four-to-one margin. In the late 1990s a citizens group called Citizens Involved in the Northwest Quadrant (CINQ) was formed to oppose the completion of the freeway. In 2008, a group of Arvada residents sued to try to stop the city from joining the newly formed JPPHA.
