= Northwest Parkway =

Highway in Colorado

Northwest Parkway
- Northwest Parkway highlighted in red

Route information
- Maintained by Northwest Parkway Public Highway Authority
- Length: 9.052 mi (14.568 km)

Major junctions
- West end: US 36 / Interlocken Loop in Broomfield
- East end: I-25 / US 87 / E-470 in Broomfield

Location
- Country: United States
- State: Colorado
- Counties: Broomfield, Boulder

Highway system
- Colorado State Highway System; Interstate; US; State; Scenic

Northwest Parkway is a 9.05-mile (14.56 km) limited-access toll road that runs from US 36 to the I-25/E-470 interchange. Both termini are in Broomfield, northwest of Denver. In combination with E-470 (47 miles (76 km)) and State Highway 470 (SH 470; 27 miles (43 km)), Northwest Parkway forms a partial beltway of approximately 83 miles (134 km) around the Denver metropolitan area. Some 18 miles (29 km) lie between the west end of Northwest Parkway and the northwest end of SH 470, the opposite end of the beltway.

Northwest Parkway was funded entirely with private money and charges a $7.50 toll. Tolls may be paid using highway-speed electronic tolling.

== Route description ==
Northwest Parkway begins in Broomfield as a continuation of E-470 westward. Following a stack interchange with I-25, the parkway crosses Huron Street, surrounded by open fields. After having an interchange with Sheridan Parkway, the route passes a small pond, followed by an underpass with Lowell Boulevard. Near Dillon Road, the parkway interchanges with US 287 in Lafayette before reentering Broomfield near the end of the toll portion at 96th Street. The parkway continues untolled for one last mile (1.6 km) before terminating at an interchange with US 36, becoming Interlocken Loop.

== Tolls ==
Tolls on Northwest Parkway are charged based on a barrier toll system. It costs two-axle vehicles $7.50 for the barrier on the mainline gantry and $3.00 for the ramp gantries. ExpressToll and Go-Pass users do not pay processing fees, late fees, or any other fees in addition to the toll amount.

== History ==
Northwest Parkway opened to the public in November 2003. In November 2005, a new interchange opened at Sheridan Boulevard in northern Broomfield. In August 2001, the cities of Westminster and Arvada put into motion the completion of an extension of Northwest Parkway, sometimes termed W-470, to connect to SH 470, I-70, and US 6 in Golden. The city of Golden struck down the proposal, but, in a compromise with the Colorado Department of Transportation (CDOT), an environmental impact statement (EIS) was completed. Most likely, Indiana Street and SH 93 would be used to complete the beltway. In October 2025, Northwest Parkway adopted a new official logo as part of a rebranding effort that emphasized sustainability, including a clear leaning towards solar energy initiatives.

=== Transition to Foreign Private Operation ===
In 2007, the board of directors of Northwest Parkway agreed to lease the operations of the highway to a consortium for 99 years. The two companies of the consortium are Brisa – Auto-estradas de Portugal and CCR S.A. According to the Boulder Daily Camera, this was the fourth time in two years that operations of an existing toll road in the US had been turned over to a private company under a long-term lease.

Northwest Parkway had been consistently generating less income than envisioned when it was funded by three local governments—Broomfield, Lafayette, and Weld County. The parkway was built with $416.4 million (equivalent to $678 million in 2024) in bonds, to be paid back with toll revenue over 35 years. Due to the road's underuse, the bond debt was downgraded in 2006. Use in 2007 was 12,000 cars per day, well below the 18,500 expected by 2004, one year after opening.

In 2024, VINCI Highways completed the acquisition of 100% of NWP HoldCo LLC, the company operating Northwest Parkway, for approximately $1.2 billion. The concession, which runs through 2106, provides a framework for toll revenue and operational management. The agreement was signed in February and financially closed in April 2024, and is VINCI's first major infrastructure investment in the United States within an established regulatory and traffic environment.

== Exit list ==
County	Location	mi	km	Exit	Destinations	Notes
City and County of Broomfield		55.45	89.24		Interlocken Loop	Continuation south
City and County of Broomfield		55.45	89.24		US 36 (Denver-Boulder Turnpike)	
City and County of Broomfield		54.450	87.629		96th Street / Via Varra – Louisville	At-grade intersection
City and County of Broomfield		54.450	87.629	Western end of freeway section		
Boulder	Lafayette	52.360	84.265	52	US 287 / Dillon Road – Lafayette, Broomfield	Tolled eastbound exit and westbound entrance
City and County of Broomfield		49.280	79.308	Toll Gantry		
City and County of Broomfield		48.070	77.361	48	Sheridan Parkway	Tolled eastbound entrance and westbound exit
City and County of Broomfield		46.950	75.559	47	I-25 (US 87) – Denver, Fort Collins	Exit 228 on I-25
City and County of Broomfield		46.950	75.559		E-470 south – Denver International Airport	Continuation south
1.000 mi = 1.609 km; 1.000 km = 0.621 mi: Electronic toll collection

== See also ==
- Colorado State Highway 470
- E-470
