= Kittredge, Colorado =

Census-designated place in Jefferson County, CO, USA

- Census-designated place
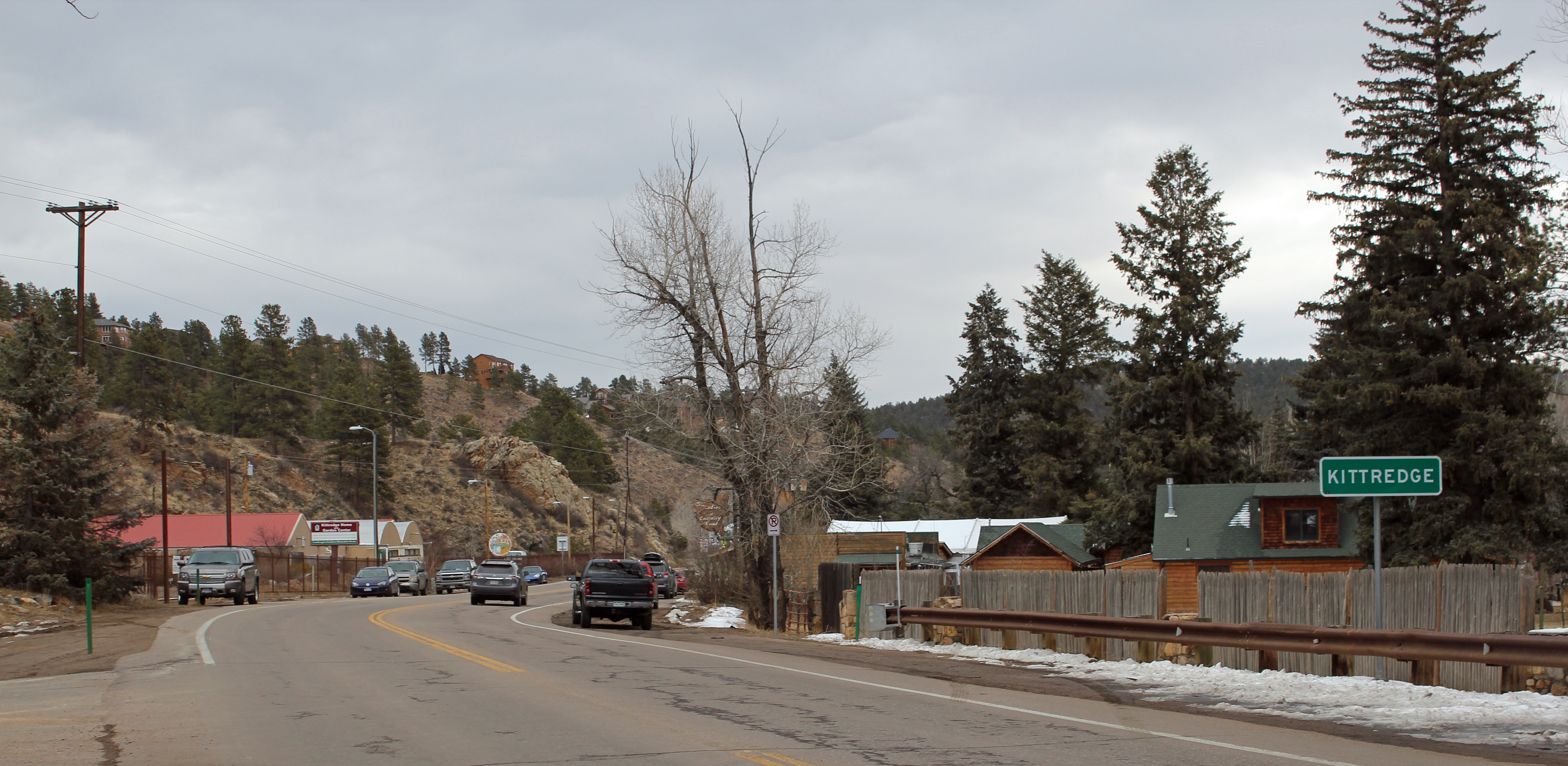
- Kittredge in 2014

- Location of the Kittredge CDP in Jefferson County, Colorado
- Coordinates: 39°39′33″N 105°18′16″W
- Country: United States
- State: Colorado
- County: Jefferson County

Government
  - Type: Unincorporated town

Area
  - Total: 1.885 sq mi (4.881 km^{2})
  - Land: 1.884 sq mi (4.880 km^{2})
  - Water: 0.00046 sq mi (0.0012 km^{2})
- Elevation: 7,074 ft (2,156 m)

Population (2020)
  - Total: 1,308
  - Density: 694.2/sq mi (268.0/km^{2})
- Time zone: UTC-7 (MST)
  - Summer (DST): UTC-6 (MDT)
- ZIP Code: 80457
- Area codes: 303 & 720
- GNIS feature ID: 2408491

Kittredge is an unincorporated town, a post office, and a census-designated place (CDP) located in and governed by Jefferson County, Colorado, United States. The CDP is a part of the Denver–Aurora–Lakewood, CO Metropolitan Statistical Area. The Kittredge post office has the ZIP code 80457. At the United States Census 2020, the population of the Kittredge CDP was 1,308.

== History ==
The Kittredge Post Office has been in operation since 1923. C. M. Kittredge, an early postmaster, gave the community his name.

== Geography ==
Kittredge is located in the valley of Bear Creek. Colorado State Highway 74 leads east down Bear Creek Canyon 8 miles (13 km) to Morrison and southwest (upstream) 2 miles (3 km) to Evergreen.

The Kittredge CDP has an area of 1,206 acres (4.881 km^{2}), including 0.30 acres (0.0012 km^{2}) of water.

== Demographics ==
The United States Census Bureau initially defined the Kittredge CDP for the United States Census 2000.

Kittredge CDP, Colorado
Year	Pop.	±%
2000	954	—
2010	1,304	+36.7%
2020	1,308	+0.3%
Source: United States Census Bureau

=== 2020 census ===
As of the 2020 census, Kittredge had a population of 1,308. The median age was 41.2 years. 21.3% of residents were under the age of 18 and 12.4% of residents were 65 years of age or older. For every 100 females there were 99.7 males, and for every 100 females age 18 and over there were 94.5 males age 18 and over.

0.0% of residents lived in urban areas, while 100.0% lived in rural areas.

There were 529 households in Kittredge, of which 28.7% had children under the age of 18 living in them. Of all households, 53.5% were married-couple households, 18.1% were households with a male householder and no spouse or partner present, and 22.7% were households with a female householder and no spouse or partner present. About 26.8% of all households were made up of individuals and 12.6% had someone living alone who was 65 years of age or older.

There were 582 housing units, of which 9.1% were vacant. The homeowner vacancy rate was 1.0% and the rental vacancy rate was 8.5%.

Racial composition as of the 2020 census
Race	Number	Percent
White	1,187	90.7%
Black or African American	11	0.8%
American Indian and Alaska Native	10	0.8%
Asian	5	0.4%
Native Hawaiian and Other Pacific Islander	0	0.0%
Some other race	13	1.0%
Two or more races	82	6.3%
Hispanic or Latino (of any race)	63	4.8%

== Education ==
Kittredge is served by the Jefferson County Public Schools.

== Notable residents ==
Kittredge is the home of former U.S. Senator and U.S. Presidential aspirant Gary Hart.

== See also ==
- North Central Colorado Urban Area
