= E-470 =

Highway in Colorado

E-470
- Map of the Denver metropolitan area with C-470 in red and E-470 in green

Route information
- Maintained by E-470 Public Highway Authority
- Length: 46.950 mi (75.559 km)
- Existed: 1991–present

Major junctions
- South end: I-25 / US 87 / SH 470 in Lone Tree
- I-70 / US 36 / US 40 / US 287 in Aurora; I-76 / US 6 in Commerce City; US 85 in Brighton
- North end: I-25 / US 87 / Northwest Parkway in Thornton

Location
- Country: United States
- State: Colorado
- Counties: Douglas, Arapahoe, Denver, Adams

Highway system
- Colorado State Highway System; Interstate; US; State; Scenic
← SH 470	→ US 491

E-470 is a 47-mile-long (76 km) controlled-access toll road that traverses the eastern portion of the Denver metropolitan area in the US state of Colorado. It is the eastern half of the 470 beltway that serves Meridian, Parker, Aurora, Denver International Airport, and Brighton.

The toll road is neither a state highway nor an Interstate Highway and is instead owned and maintained by the E-470 Public Highway Authority, which is controlled by a governing board of eight elected officials of eight local governments. Construction and operation involves no state or federal funding or taxes, with the exception of a $10 fee originally charged on vehicle registrations for residents of Arapahoe, Adams, and Douglas counties. Historically, 86%±2% of the road's revenues have come from tolls.

== Route description ==
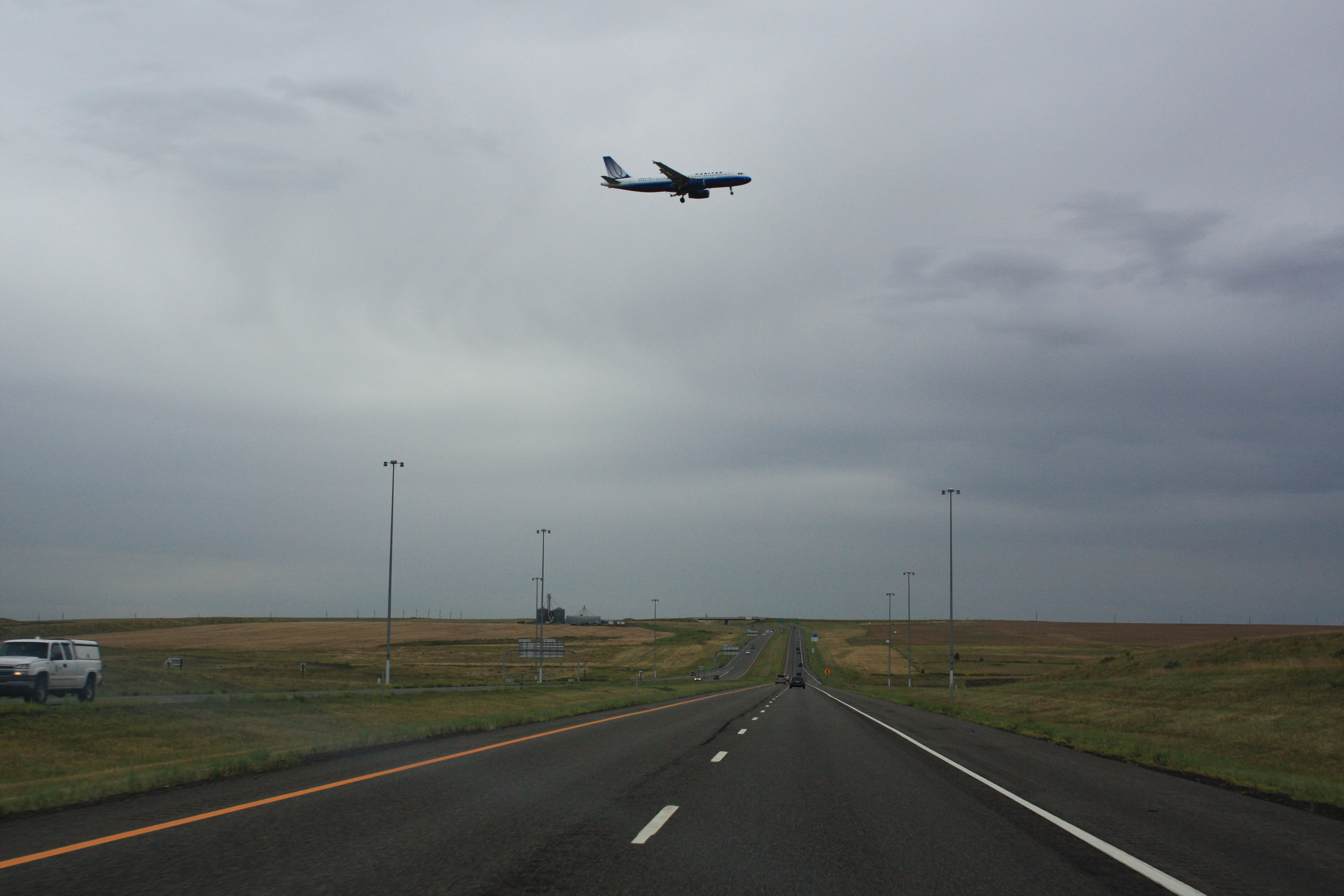
E-470 near Denver International Airport at the interchange with Peña Boulevard

E-470 provides an alternate north–south route to Interstate 25 (I-25) for travelers wishing to bypass Denver to the east. The tollway begins at the I-25/State Highway 470 (SH 470, C-470) interchange in Lone Tree and runs east through the unincorporated community of Meridian and south of the Centennial Airport. It then passes through the north side of Parker, interchanging with SH 83 (Parker Road) before continuing east to Southlands, an outdoor mall in southeast Aurora. It then turns north through Aurora, passing east of Buckley Space Force Base before interchanging with I-70, forming a fly-by interchange. The highway continues north, passing west of Denver International Airport and interchanging with Peña Boulevard at a full cloverleaf interchange to provide access to the airport. E-470 then continues north and then turns to the west, entering the outskirts of Brighton and interchanging with I-76 and then U.S. Highway 85 (US 85) near the unincorporated community of Henderson before reaching the northern end at the interchange with I-25, where the toll road continues west as Northwest Parkway north of Thornton.

The quasi-government entity that manages the highway, the E-470 Public Highway Authority, consists of eight member jurisdictions: Adams, Arapahoe, and Douglas counties and the cities of Aurora, Brighton, Commerce City, and Thornton and the town of Parker. In addition to all of these jurisdictions, E-470 also passes through the city and county of Denver near Denver International Airport. Affiliate, nonvoting members of the Authority, which the highway does not directly serve, are the cities of Arvada, Lone Tree, and Greeley; Weld County; and the city and county of Broomfield. Ex officio members are the Colorado Department of Transportation (CDOT), the Denver Regional Council of Governments (DRCOG), the Regional Air Quality Council, and the Regional Transportation District (RTD). The authority is headquartered in Aurora.

== Tolls ==
The toll rate on E-470 for vehicles that do not have ExpressToll automated toll transponders is roughly $0.37 per mile ($0.23/km). In addition to 19 ramp toll interchanges, there are five mainline toll gantries along the 47-mile (76 km) route and the non-discounted passenger car toll to pass each mainline station is either $4.15 or $4.50; the discounted rates are $2.70 or $2.95. Drivers with ExpressToll accounts, E-470's automated toll collection service, and transponders mounted on their vehicle save 20 percent on posted toll rates along E-470. The toll stations no longer accept cash; E-470 was one of the first highways in the US to implement full highway-speed electronic tolling. Regarding License Plate Toll (for vehicles without ExpressToll transponders), cameras at each station photograph the front and rear license plate of each vehicle. A bill is mailed after approximately 30 days to the registered owner of the vehicle in accordance with state law.

Rental car companies at Denver International Airport have been accused of overcharging unwitting visitors for unpaid tolls because of the road's cashless collection system.

ExpressToll is also part of the Central United States Interoperability Hub. Toll roads included are the Kansas Turnpike (via K-TAG), the Oklahoma Turnpike Authority system via Pikepass, the North Texas Tollway Authority (NTTA) system via TollTag and the TxTag system, the Harris County Toll Road Authority (HCTRA) system in Houston via EZ TAG, and the Florida's Turnpike Enterprise (FTE) system via SunPass.

Toll tags accepted on E470 include ExpressToll, EZ-TAG, TollTag, TxTag, K-TAG, Pikepass, and SunPass. With no compatible toll tag, drivers can be billed at the higher license-plate toll rate.

== History ==
E-470 is the eastern portion of what was originally planned as Interstate 470 (I-470), a full outer beltway for the Denver metropolitan area proposed by CDOT in the 1960s. After the completion of SH 470, plans for the eastern extension gained momentum in the 1980s, as Denver moved forward with plans for a new international airport in its corridor. Recognizing the highway's development potential, a number of local governments joined to create the E-470 Public Highway Authority, a quasi-governmental entity that would construct the highway. In 1987, the Public Highway Authority Law was passed by the Colorado State Legislature, giving the E-470 Public Highway Authority the power to do everything needed to plan, design, finance, construct, and operate the toll highway. The highway would be financed through tolls, a relative rarity in the western US.

The first section, between I-25 in the south and Parker Road in Douglas County, opened to traffic June 1, 1991. Tolling began on July 15, making E-470 the first highway in the US to implement open road electronic tolling. The highway was opened segment by segment until the final stretch connecting to I-25 in the north in Adams County opened on January 3, 2003.

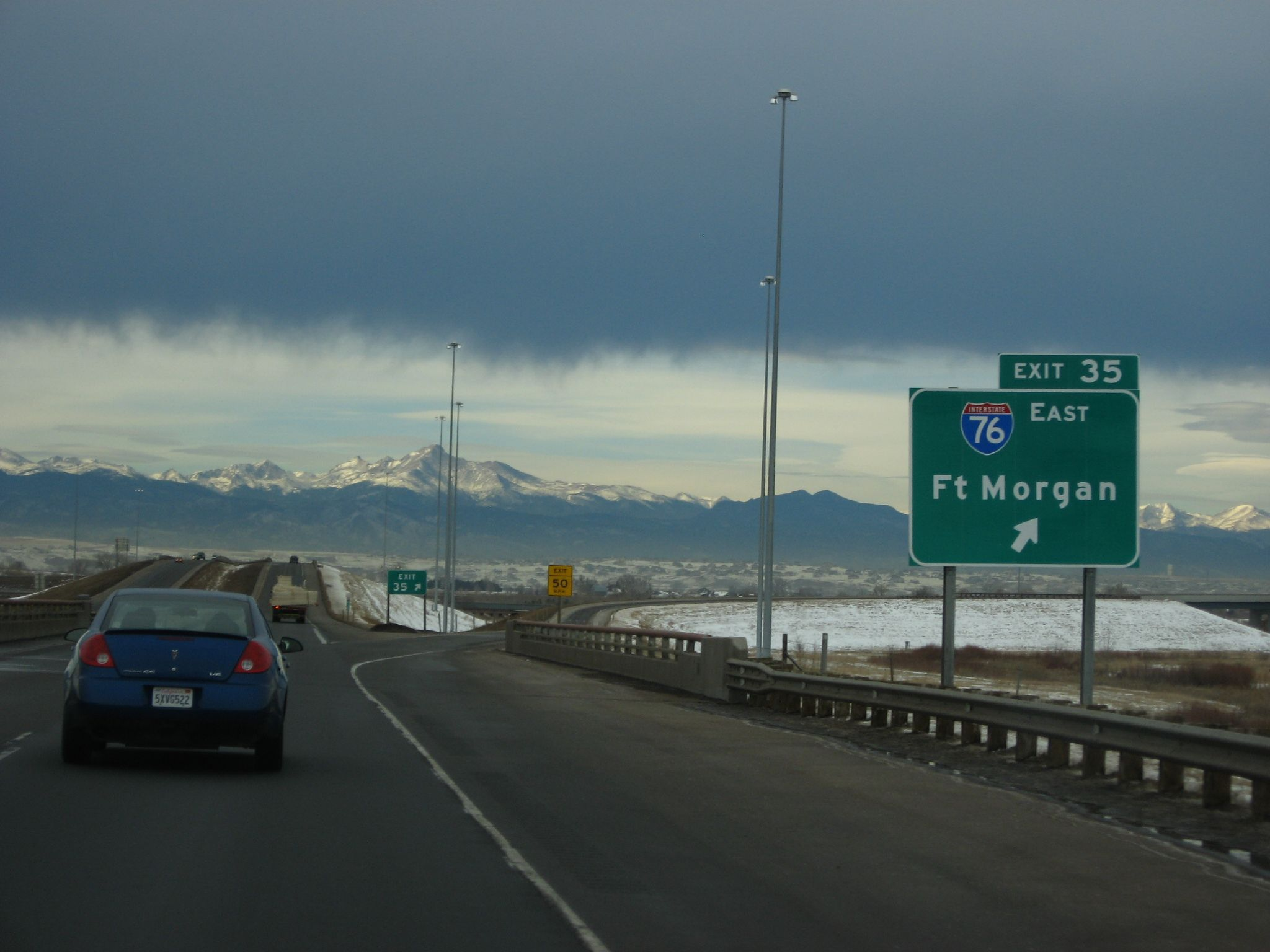
E-470 at I-76

In its early years, traffic was light as the completed portion was short and traversed a largely undeveloped area. With the opening of Denver International Airport in 1995, E-470 came in as a direct route to the airport from the rapidly growing southern tier of the metropolitan area. Upon its completion, the highway provided the same access for northern Colorado, itself a high-growth area. However, perhaps the most significant growth in the region will occur in the E-470 corridor itself, which spawned numerous annexations by member cities; Commerce City has doubled in land area in anticipation of this new development. In the coming decades, 250,000 new residents are expected along the E-470 corridor in Aurora alone, which would nearly double that city's population.

Up until 2006, E-470 had four signalized intersections with I-70 and its outer roads, which often got congested at peak hours. In 2006, the E-470 mainline was relocated about one-quarter mile (0.40 km) to the west to bypass the traffic signals and provide free-flowing conditions for toll customers. Ramp traffic accessing I-70 continues to use the signalized interchange, except for northbound E-470 to westbound I-70 traffic, which uses a flyover ramp. The I-70/E-470 Fly-By Interchange Complex in Aurora was recognized by the Design Build Institute of America (DBIA) with a National Design Build Award in 2008.

In November 2014, an additional interchange opened at Quebec Street in Thornton.

In April 2016, E-470 started construction work to widen an eight-mile (13 km) stretch of the toll road to three lanes in each direction between Parker Road and Quincy Avenue in southeastern Aurora. The $90-million (equivalent to $113 million in 2024) project was completed December 2017. According to the 2015 E-470 Annual Report (page 3), "The widening is being constructed now to get ahead of the curve on future traffic volume, which has had double-digit growth in each of the past three years."

== Exit list ==
County	Location	mi	km	Exit	Destinations	Notes
Douglas	Lone Tree	0.000	0.000		SH 470 west – Grand Junction	Continuation west
Douglas	Lone Tree	0.000	0.000	26 (NB); 1A (SB)	I-25 / US 87 – Denver, Colorado Springs	Stack interchange; exit 194 on I-25
Douglas	Meridian	0.506	0.814	1B	Jamaica Street to County Line Road	Southbound exit and northbound entrance
Douglas	Meridian	1.711	2.754	2	Peoria Street – Centennial Airport	Tolled northbound exit and southbound entrance
Douglas	Parker	2.700	4.345	Toll Gantry A		
Douglas	Parker	3.502	5.636	3	Chambers Road	Tolled northbound entrance and southbound exit
Douglas	Parker	4.380	7.049	4	Jordan Road – Parker	Tolled northbound entrance and southbound exit
Douglas	Parker	5.180	8.336	5	SH 83 (Parker Road) – Parker, Centennial, Aurora	
Arapahoe	Aurora	8.887	14.302	9	Gartrell Road	Tolled northbound exit and southbound entrance
Arapahoe	Aurora	10.683	17.193	10	Smoky Hill Road	Tolled northbound exit and southbound entrance
Arapahoe	Aurora	13.352	21.488	13	Quincy Avenue – Aurora	Tolled northbound exit and southbound entrance
Arapahoe	Aurora	16.150	25.991	Toll Gantry B		
Arapahoe	Aurora	16.451	26.475	16	Jewell Avenue to Iliff Avenue	Tolled northbound entrance and southbound exit
Arapahoe	Aurora	19.000	30.578	19	6th Parkway / Stephen D. Hogan Parkway	Tolled northbound entrance and southbound exit
Arapahoe–Adams county line	Aurora	20.375	32.790	20	I-70 / Colfax Avenue / 19th Avenue / Gun Club Road – Limon, Aurora, Denver	Signed as exits 20A (east) and 20B (west) northbound; exit 289 on I-70
Adams	Aurora	21.7	34.9	Toll Gantry C		
Adams	Aurora	22.5	36.2	22	38th Avenue / The Aurora Highlands Parkway	Full interchange opened in 2025; tolled northbound entrance and southbound exit
Adams	Aurora	23.624	38.019	23	48th Avenue	New interchange opened in May 2025; tolled northbound entrance and southbound exit
Adams	Aurora	24.477	39.392	24	56th Avenue – Colorado Air and Space Port	Tolled northbound entrance and southbound exit
Adams	Aurora	25.523	41.075	25	64th Avenue	Tolled northbound entrance and southbound exit
City and County of Denver		27.849	44.819	28	Peña Boulevard – Denver International Airport	Signed as exits 28A (east) and 28B (west); exit 6 on Peña Boulevard
Adams	Commerce City	29.807	47.970	Toll Gantry D		
Adams	Commerce City	30.562	49.185	31	96th Avenue	Tolled northbound entrance and southbound exit
Adams	Commerce City	32.678	52.590	32	104th Avenue	Tolled northbound entrance and southbound exit
Adams	Commerce City	34.130	54.927	34	To I-76 west / 120th Avenue	Tolled northbound entrance and southbound exit
Adams	Brighton	35.491	57.117	35	I-76 east – Fort Morgan	Northbound exit and southbound entrance; exit 18 on I-76
Adams	Brighton	36.344	58.490	36	Sable Boulevard	Interchange under construction; to be tolled northbound exit and southbound entrance
Adams		38.465	61.903	38	US 85 to I-76 west – Brighton, Greeley, Commerce City, Denver	Tolled northbound exit and southbound entrance
Adams	Todd Creek	40.220	64.728	Toll Gantry E		
Adams	Thornton	41.710	67.126	41	Quebec Street	Opened on November 24, 2014; tolled northbound entrance and southbound exit
Adams	Thornton	43.817	70.517	43	Colorado Boulevard – Thornton	Tolled northbound entrance and southbound exit
Adams	Thornton	44.843	72.168	45	York Street	Tolled northbound entrance and southbound exit
Adams–Broomfield county line	Thornton–Broomfield line	46.950	75.559	47	I-25 / US 87 – Fort Collins, Denver	Exit 228 on I-25
Adams–Broomfield county line	Thornton–Broomfield line	46.950	75.559		Northwest Parkway west – Broomfield, Boulder	Continuation west
1.000 mi = 1.609 km; 1.000 km = 0.621 mi: Electronic toll collection; Incomplete access
