= List of Interstate Highways in Colorado =

Interstate Highways of the Colorado State Highway System
- Standard highway markers used in the state of Colorado for Interstate 70, Interstate 225, and Interstate 76 Business
- Interstate Highways highlighted in red

System information
- Maintained by CDOT
- Length: 956 mi (1,539 km)
- Formed: October 11, 1964

Highway names
- Interstates: Interstate X (I-X)
- Business routes: Interstate X Business (I-X Bus.)

System links
- Colorado State Highway System; Interstate; US; State; Scenic

The Interstate Highways in Colorado are the segments of the national Dwight D. Eisenhower System of Interstate and Defense Highways that are owned and maintained by the state of Colorado, totaling about 956 miles (1,539 km). Colorado has three main highways (two-digit routes), and two auxiliary highways (three-digit routes), totaling five Interstates, all are located within the Denver metropolitan area. The longest Interstate in Colorado is Interstate 70 (I-70), which is 449.58 miles (723.53 km) There are also 17 active business routes and seven former business routes, most of them are from I-70. The last segment of Interstate Highway to open up to date was I-76, which was between Pecos Street and I-25 northwest of Denver.

== Description ==
The Colorado Department of Transportation (CDOT) is the agency responsible for maintaining the Colorado State Highway System, which includes the Interstate Highways in Colorado. These highways are built to Interstate Highway standards, which are freeways with speed limits up to 75 miles per hour in rural areas and 65 miles per hour in urban areas, primarily in the Denver and Colorado Springs areas. In very populated areas where the traffic volume is the greatest, the speed limit can drop as low as 55 miles per hour. The numbering scheme used to designate the Interstates was developed by AASHTO, an organization composed of the various state departments of transportation in the United States.

The Interstate Highway System covers approximately 956 miles (1,539 km) in Colorado which consists of three primary highways and two auxiliary highways. There are also a total of 17 active business routes in the state, 13 of which are business routes of I-70. The longest highway in the state is Interstate 70 which has a span of 449.51 miles (723.42 km) that runs west to east across the state, serving Grand Junction, Denver, Aurora, and Limon. Interstate 270, I-70's only auxiliary route in Colorado, is the shortest interstate highway in the state, spanning about 7 miles (11 km). All of Colorado's interstates are located in the Denver–Aurora Metropolitan Area while other major cities in Colorado except Boulder and Greeley are only served by the same primary routes that run through the Denver Metro Area.

== History ==
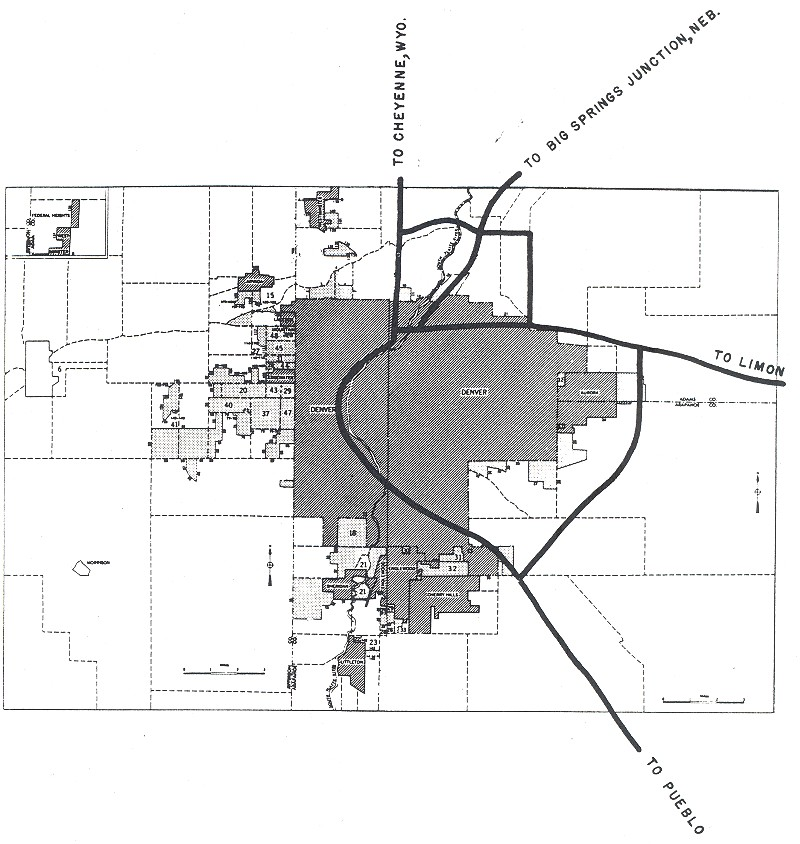
1955 map showing planned Interstate highways around Denver

Colorado had already begun planning a modern inter-city route along the Front Range as early as 1944. The first section of freeway was also in 1944 which would later become Interstate 70 that originally terminated near I-25 in Denver before getting extended across the Rocky Mountains along the US 6 and US 40 corridors. The cities of Denver and Pueblo began constructing a multi-lane route that would become Interstate 25. The first segment of freeway was a two mile segment in Denver, which began construction in August 1948 and was completed two years later. Then, the entire segment of the Valley Highway was completed in 1958, later receiving the Interstate 25 designation. Pueblo would complete the section of freeway in 1959. Interstate 76 is the last primary highway that was completed in 1993, then was later extended to Interstate 70 in Arvada which wasn't completed until 2002. It originally started as Interstate 80S which had two segments in Denver and northeastern Colorado. In 1976, AASHTO renumbered the route to I-76 in accordance with its policy against suffixed routes to eliminate confusion with Interstate 80.

Two more auxiliary routes were planned in the Denver Metro Area around the same time as the primary routes. Interstate 270 was the first route proposed near Denver. It originally was proposed by CDOT to be designated as Interstate 425 but it was rejected by AASHTO and was renumbered to I-270 on February 26, 1959, about six years before construction began between I-70 and Vasquez Boulevard. It was later extended to I-76 (I-80S) in 1967 and then to I-25 in 1999 to continue along the Denver–Boulder Turnpike. A year prior to I-270 being constructed, Interstate 225 would also begin construction, starting at I-70 and would work its way south through Aurora and into the Denver Tech Center by 1976. A full beltway around Denver was proposed by CDOT as well and was added to the Federal Highway Act of 1968 and was to be Interstate 470. The proposal was rejected by the Colorado Department of Health and then by Colorado Governor Richard Lamm suggesting alternatives to land uses that would be more environmentally friendly. It was later decided that the federal highway funds were to be used to construct a partial beltway in the southwest suburbs that was known as the Centennial Parkway and then receiving the State Highway 470 designation. The beltway was later extended east of I-25 and is now a toll road known as E-470 and then eventually west of I-25 north of Denver, known as Northwest Parkway. The 470 beltway remains as an incomplete beltway with the western portion between Broomfield and Golden missing.

== Interstate highways ==
Number	Length (mi)	Length (km)	Southern or western terminus	Northern or eastern terminus	Formed	Removed	Notes
I-25	298.87	480.98	I-25 at the New Mexico state line	I-25 at the Wyoming state line	1958	current	Runs concurrent with US 87 in its entire length in the state. Nicknamed the Valley Highway through Denver, the Monument Valley Highway in Colorado Springs, and the John F. Kennedy Memorial Highway in Pueblo. It is also part of the unofficial Pan-American Highway
I-70	449.589	723.543	I-70 at the Utah state line	I-70 at the Kansas state line	1956	current	Longest interstate in Colorado. It was the first interstate highway to be designated in the state of Colorado in 1956. A section from I-270 in Denver to the Kansas State Line is known as the Dwight D. Eisenhower Highway
I-76	187.29	301.41	I-70 in Arvada	I-76 at the Nebraska state line	1976	current	Originally I-80S until 1976. Last interstate to be completed in the state of Colorado. Completed in 1993.
I-80S	178.22	286.82	I-25/US 87 in North Washington	I-80S at the Nebraska state line	1958	1976	Two sections of freeway located near Denver and in northeastern Colorado, near the Nebraska border. It was renumbered to I-76 by AASHTO to conform to policy against suffixed routes
I-225	11.959	19.246	I-25 in Denver	I-70 in Aurora and Denver	1976	current	Only active Colorado interstate that doesn't run concurrent with another highway in its entire length. It is also the only auxiliary route for I-25 in general. Completed in 1976
I-270	7.107	11.438	I-25/US 36 in unincorporated Adams County	I-70 in Denver	1965	current	Runs concurrent with US 36 in its entire length. Also known as the Dwight D. Eisenhower Highway
I-425	5.35	8.61	I-25/US 36 in unincorporated Adams County	I-70 in Denver	1958	1959	Proposed designation for I-270 but was rejected and renumbered by AASHTO in 1959
I-470	—	—	Beltway around Denver		1968	—	Proposed, but cancelled due to environmental concerns. Now SH 470 (known locally as C-470), E-470, and Northwest Parkway
Former

Interstate Highways

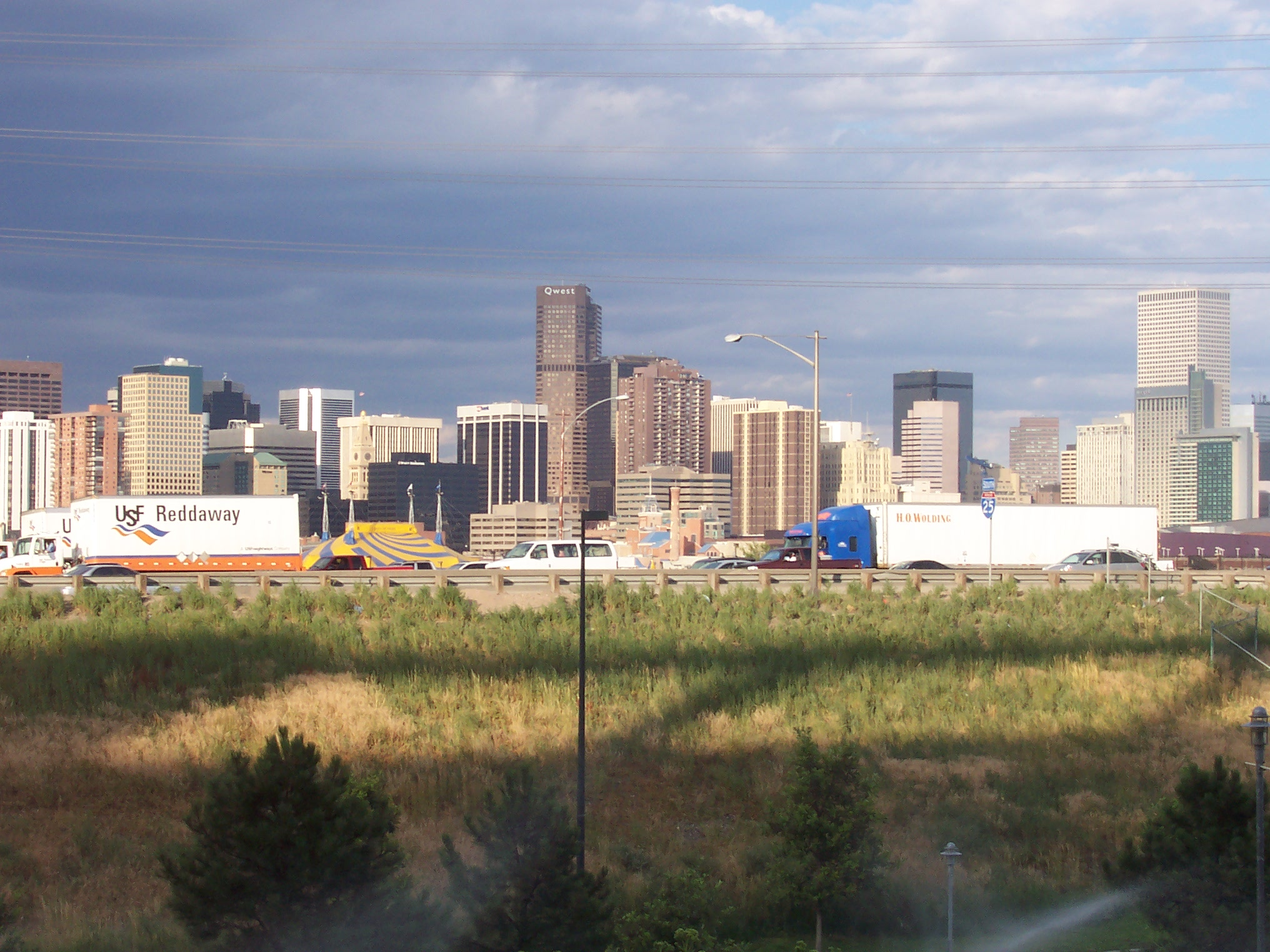
I-25 during rush hour near Downtown Denver

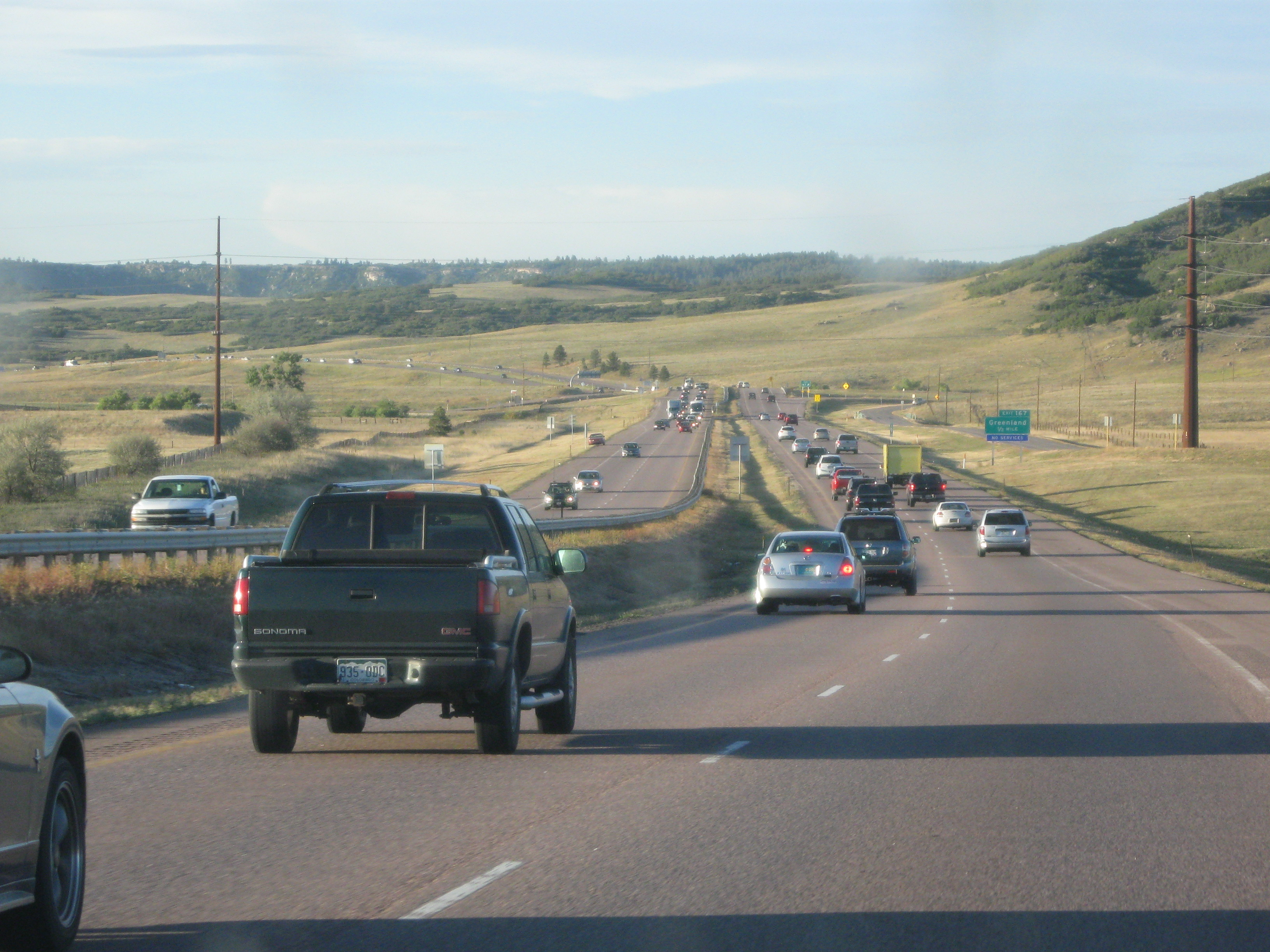
I-25 between Colorado Springs and Denver

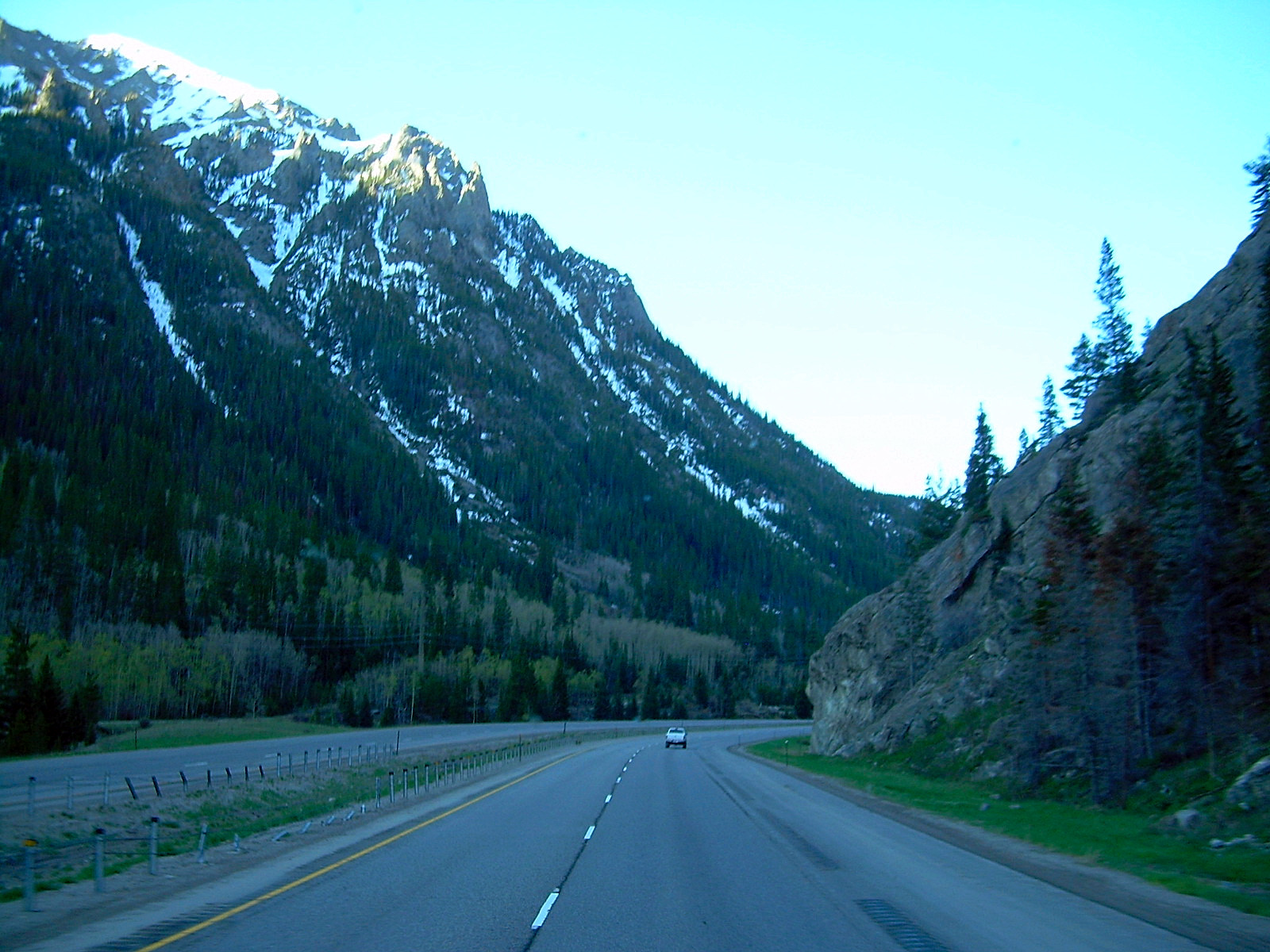
I-70 crossing the Rocky Mountains

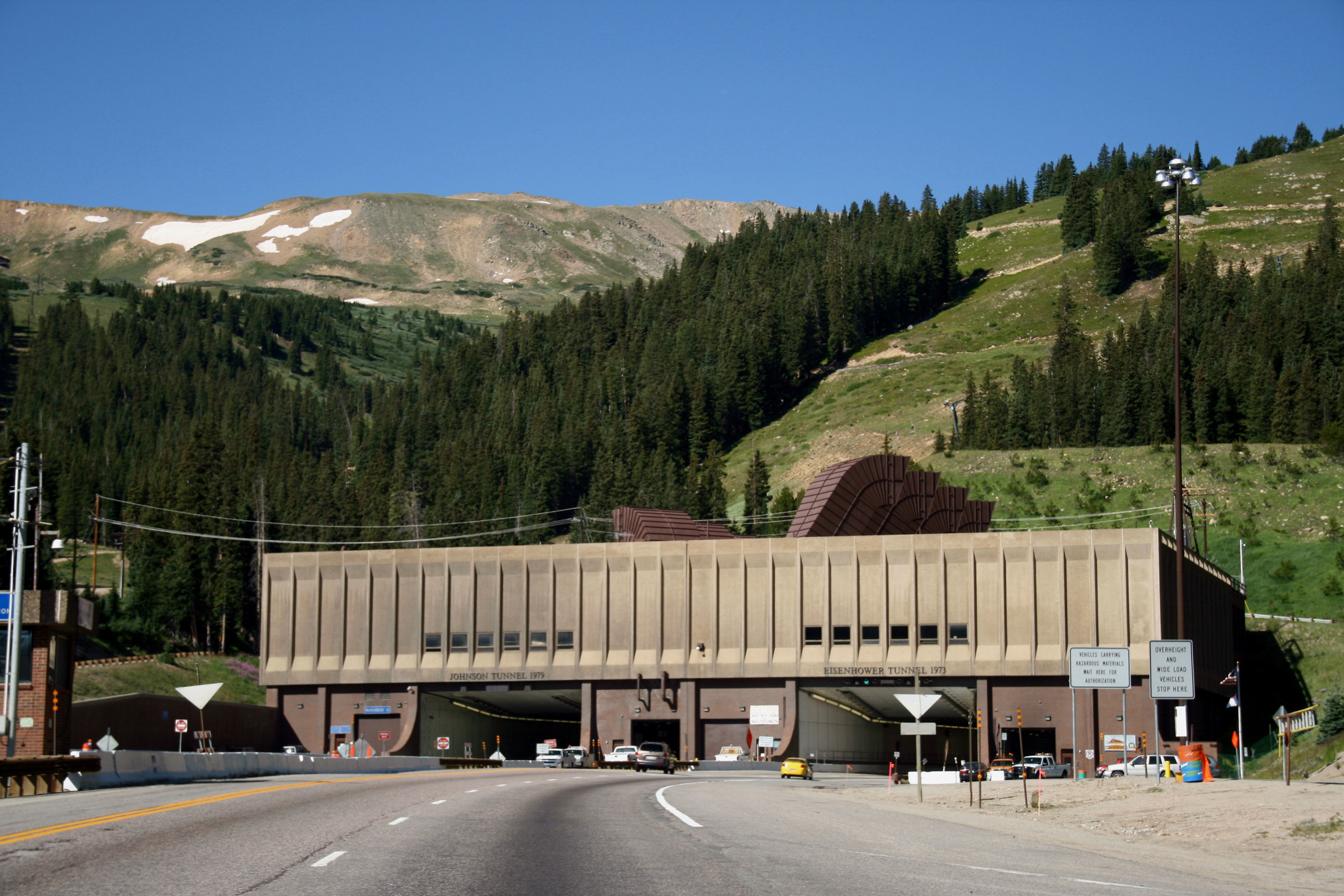
I-70 at the Eisenhower Tunnel

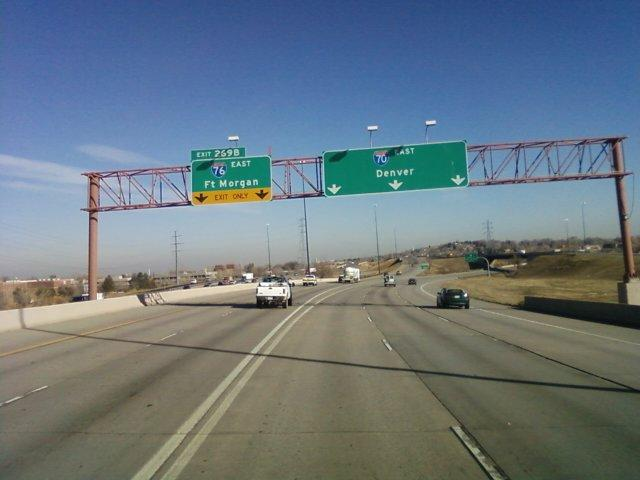
I-76 and its western terminus at I-70

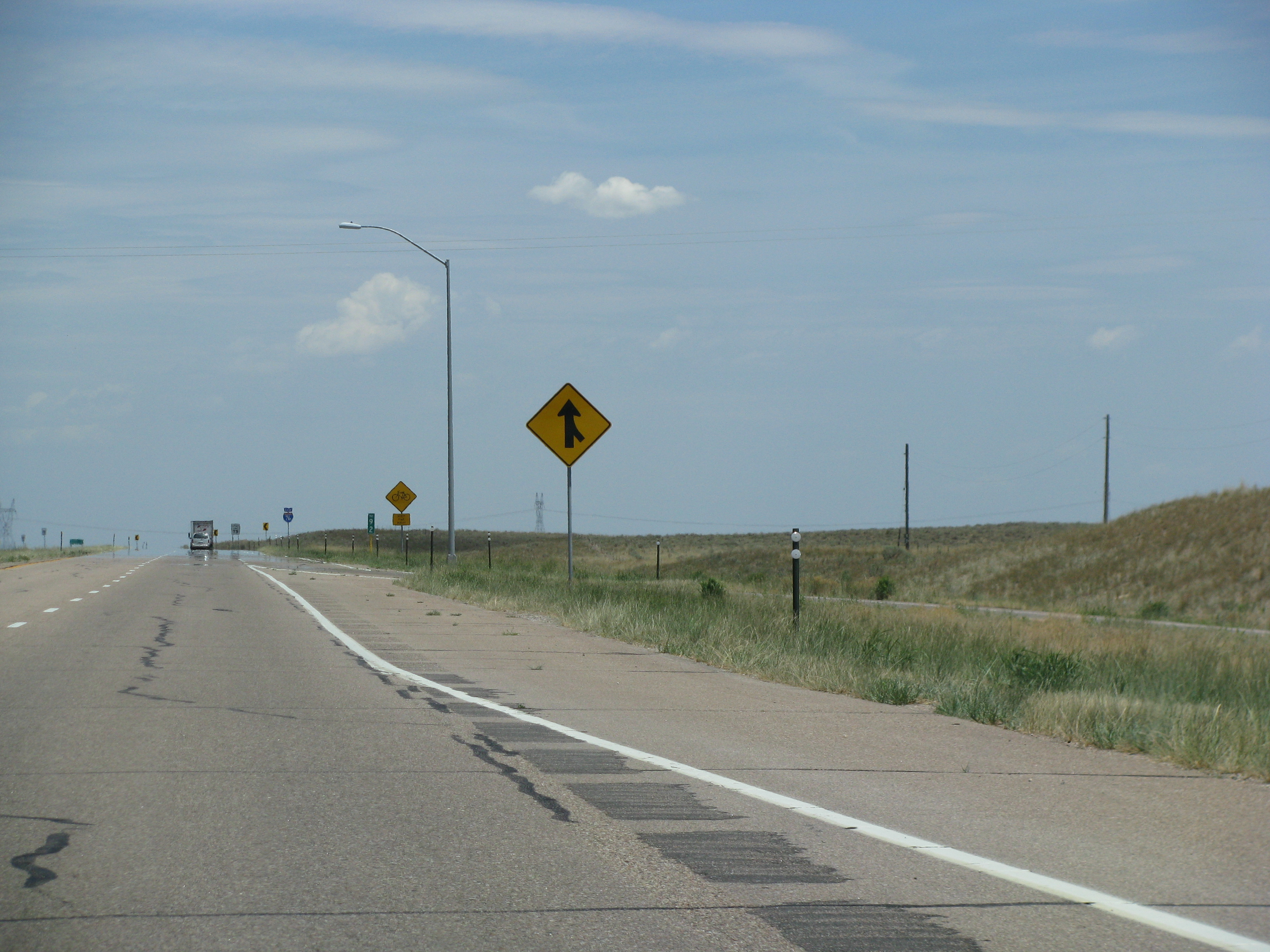
I-76 in northeastern Colorado, near Brush

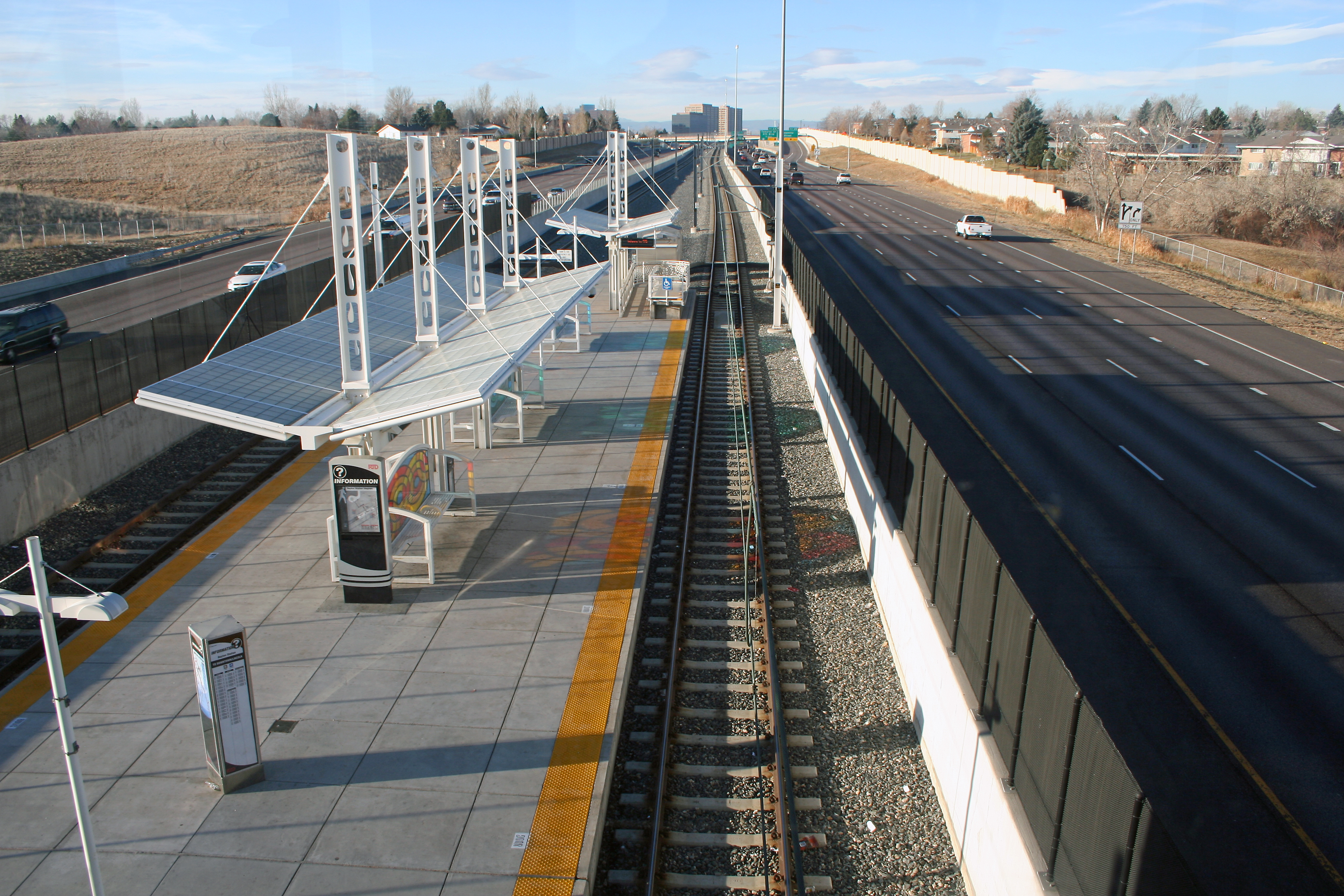
I-225 with the Dayton RTD Station in the center near Aurora

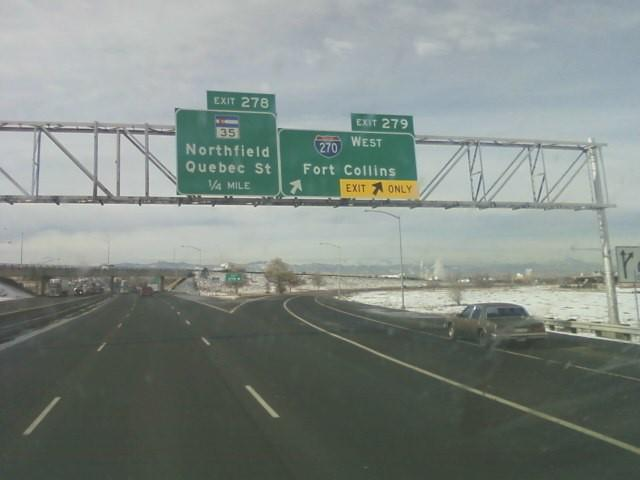
I-270 exit along I-70

== Business routes ==
Number	Length (mi)	Length (km)	Southern or western terminus	Northern or eastern terminus	Formed	Removed	Notes
I-25 BL	0.5	0.80	I-25/US 85/US 87/US 160 in Trinidad	I-25/US 85/US 87/US 160 in Trinidad	—	2009	Eliminated by a reconstruction project in 2009 which removed the original northern terminus at I-25
I-25 BS	1.948	3.135	Main Street/S. Fir Street in Aguilar	I-25/US 85/US 87/US 160 in Aguilar	—	—	Inventoried as State Highway 25B
I-25 BL	4.039	6.500	I-25/US 85/US 87/US 160 in Walsenburg	I-25/US 85/US 87 in Walsenburg	—	—	Inventoried as State Highway 25C
I-25 BL	6.75	10.86	I-25/US 24/US 85/US 87 in Colorado Springs	I-25/US 85/US 87 in Colorado Springs	—	2007	Was signed along the CanAm Highway in downtown Colorado Springs. Also ran concurrent with US 85 in its whole length. Decommissioned in December 2007 as part of a highway swap to designate Powers Boulevard as SH 21
I-25 BL	1.2	1.9	I-25/US 85/US 87 in Castle Rock	I-25/US 85/US 87 in Castle Rock	—	1996	Likely unsigned
I-70 BL	13.265	21.348	I-70/US 6/US 50 in Grand Junction	I-70/US 6 in Clifton	—	—	Inventoried as State Highway 70B. Also inventoried as State Highway 70Z along Ute Avenue
I-70 BL	3.7	6.0	I-70/US 6 in Palisade	I-70/US 6 in Palisade	—	—	
I-70 BL	4.0	6.4	I-70/US 6 in Rifle	I-70/SH 13 in Rifle	—	2004	
I-70 BS	0.222	0.357	I-70 in Silt	US 6 in Silt	—	—	Unsigned. Inventoried as State Highway 70E
I-70 BS	0.346	0.557	I-70 in Eagle	US 6 in Eagle	—	—	Unsigned. Inventoried as State Highway 70F
I-70 BS	0.577	0.929	I-70 in Edwards	US 6 in Edwards	—	—	Unsigned. Inventoried as State Highway 70G
I-70 BS	0.43	0.69	I-70 in Avon	US 6 in Avon	—	1999	
I-70 BL	2.3	3.7	I-70/US 6 in Frisco	I-70/US 6/SH 9 in Frisco	—	—	
I-70 BL	2.711	4.363	I-70/US 6/US 40 in Idaho Springs	I-70/US 6/US 40 in Idaho Springs	—	—	Signed at both termini. Unsigned along Colorado Boulevard. West end inventoried as State Highway 70K and east end inventoried as State Highway 70R
I-70 BL	26.80	43.13	I-70/US 40 in West Pleasant View	I-70/US 36/US 40/US 287 in Aurora	—	—	Runs concurrent with US 40 in its entire length. Also cosigned with US 287. Part of Colfax Avenue which serves Lakewood, Denver, and Aurora
I-70 BS	0.400	0.644	I-70/US 36/US 40/US 287 in Watkins	SH 36 in Watkins	—	—	Only signed along I-70. Was accidentally indicated with multi-colored I-70 shield at exit on westbound I-70. Inventoried as State Highway 70L
I-70 BS	0.348	0.560	I-70/US 36/US 40/US 287 in Strasburg	SH 36 in Strasburg	—	—	Unsigned. Inventoried as State Highway 70M
I-70 BS	0.396	0.637	SH 40 in Deer Trail	I-70/US 40/US 287 in Deer Trail	—	—	Unsigned. Inventoried as State Highway 70N
I-70 BS	0.353	0.568	County Road 153/Main Street in Agate	I-70/US 40/US 287 in Agate	—	—	Unsigned. Inventoried as State Highway 70O
I-70 BL	2.80	4.51	I-70/US 24/US 40/US 287 in Limon	I-70/US 24/US 40/US 287 in Limon	—	—	Runs concurrent with US 40 and US 287 in its entire length
I-70 BS	0.528	0.850	I-70 in Vona	US 24 in Vona	—	—	Unsigned. Inventoried as State Highway 70P
I-70 BL	0.377	0.607	I-70/US 385 in Burlington	I-70/US 24 in Burlington	—	—	Unsigned along route. Only indicated on I-70. Entirely concurrent with US 385. Inventoried as State Highway 70Q
I-76 BS	0.472	0.760	County Road 398 in Keenesburg	Road 18 in Keenesburg	—	—	Unsigned. Inventoried as State Highway 76B
I-76 BL	52.31	84.18	I-76/US 34 in Fort Morgan	I-76/US 6 in Sterling	—	—	Longest business route in the Interstate Highway System. Serves Fort Morgan, Brush, Hillrose, Merino, and Atwood
Former
