= U.S. Route 287 in Colorado =

Segment of American highway

U.S. Highway 287
- US 287 highlighted in red

Route information
- Auxiliary route of US 87
- Maintained by CDOT
- Length: 385.22 mi (619.95 km)

Major junctions
- South end: US 287 / US 385 / SH-3 at the Oklahoma state line near Campo
- US 160 in Springfield; US 50 / US 385 in Lamar; US 40 near Kit Carson; I-70 from Limon to Aurora; I-25 / US 6 / US 85 / US 87 in Denver; US 40 in Denver; I-70 in Denver; I-76 in Berkley; US 36 in Westminster; US 34 in Loveland
- North end: US 287 at the Wyoming state line near Tie Siding, WY

Location
- Country: United States
- State: Colorado
- Counties: Baca, Prowers, Kiowa, Cheyenne, Lincoln, Elbert, Arapahoe, Denver, Adams, Broomfield, Boulder, Larimer

Highway system
- United States Numbered Highway System; List; Special; Divided; Colorado State Highway System; Interstate; US; State; Scenic
← US 285	→ SH 291

U.S. Highway 287 (US 287) is the portion of a north–south highway in Colorado that travels from the Oklahoma state line just south of Campo to the Wyoming state line north of Fort Collins.

== Route description ==
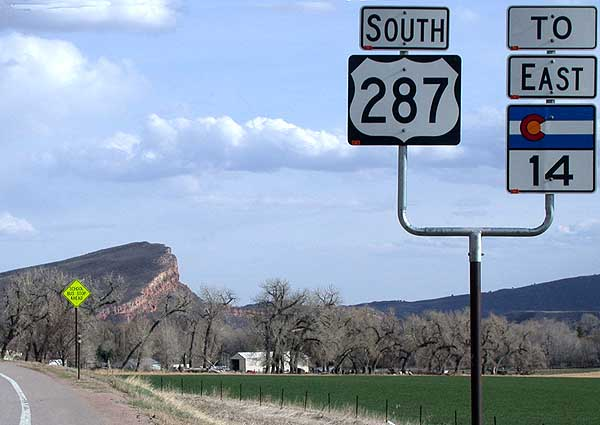
View south along U.S. Highway 287 in Larimer County, Colorado

Heading from the Oklahoma border, US 287 and US 385, upon entering the state, pass through Campo, and make an interchange with US 160 south of Springfield. In Lamar and Carlton, the highways split at an interchange with US 50, where US 287 continues north, this time concurrent with US 50. Just outside the town the highways make a sharp turn toward the west, and the road heading north is SH 196. South of Wiley, US 50 heads west, while US 287 turns north toward Wiley. East of Eads, Colorado US 287 turns toward the west again, briefly merging with SH 96. In Eads SH 96 continues west, while US 287 moves north. Just east of Kit Carson, US 287 again turns toward the west and merges with US 40. East of Limon, the two highways make two interchanges with I-70 before entering Limon. After a brief concurrency with US 24, the two highways merge with I-70. Near the outskirts of Aurora US 36 merges with the group of highways as well.

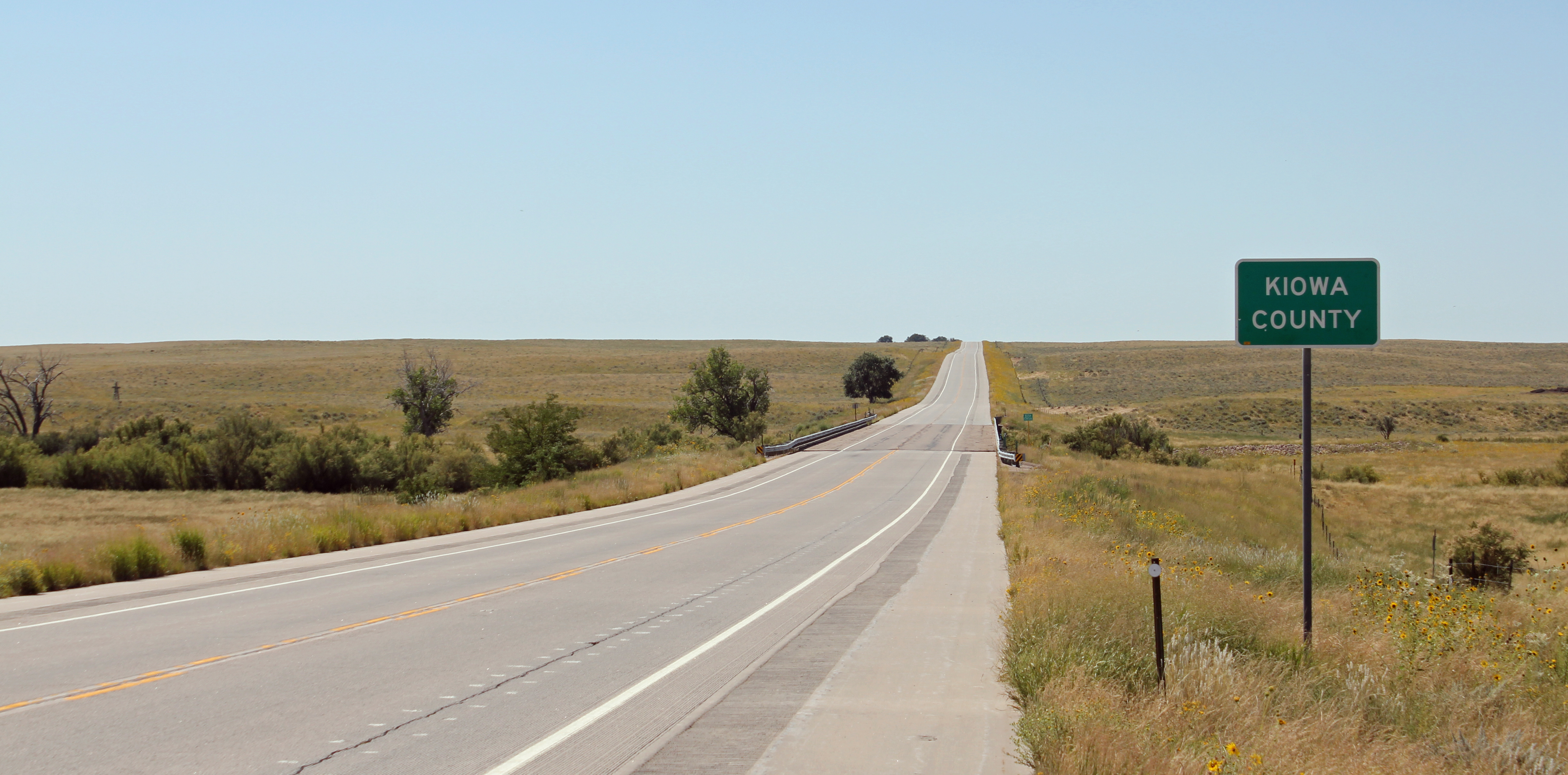
View south along U.S. Highway 287 entering Kiowa County

Just past E-470, I-70 and US 36 split to follow a more northerly course, while US 287 and US 40 continue west into Downtown Denver on Colfax Avenue. The I-25, US 6, US 87, and US 85 interchange marks US 287's second junction with its parent route, US 87. Shortly thereafter, at a cloverleaf interchange with Federal Boulevard, SH 88 runs south, US 40 continues west, and US 287 turns north on Federal Boulevard. After crossing I-76 and then US 36 for a second time, US 287 turns west onto 120th Avenue where it overlaps SH 128. Just before meeting US 36 again in Broomfield, US 287 bends back to the north, leaving SH 128 to continue west. At Baseline Road in Lafayette, SH 7 joins US 287 for about a mile, before it splits to the west on Arapahoe Avenue towards Boulder. US 287 intersects SH 119 as it enters Longmont on the very busy Main Street, then intersects SH 66 at the north edge of town. The road bypasses Berthoud en route to Loveland, where US 287 splits into the pair of one-way streets. US 287 passes through Fort Collins on College Avenue, merging with SH 14 at Jefferson Street. On the edge of the mountains, SH 14 splits and heads west into Poudre Canyon, while US 287 continues north into Wyoming.

The section of US 287 between Fort Collins and Laramie, Wyoming, carries very heavy truck traffic and is regarded as quite dangerous. A 2023 Colorado Department of Transportation report found the highway has above-average crash rates, making the highway a good candidate for more safety improvements. The 30-mile section from north of Fort Collins to the Wyoming line has had 570 crashes, including 15 fatal wrecks since 2019, and at least 15 students from the University of Wyoming in Laramie have died on the road since 2000.

== History ==
The original US 287 only traveled from Denver past the Wyoming state line in 1935. In 1940, US 287 was expanded past the Oklahoma state line (to Port Arthur, Texas), replacing US 285.

After a head-on crash on the highway in 2001, there were people lobbying for a widening of US 287 at the Wyoming state line. Their request was answered in April 2009. Throughout 2012, the highway was expanded to three lanes north of Fort Collins, was resurfaced, and contained shoulders to prevent such accidents.

Remnants of the original alignment of SH 123 from Ted's Place to the Wyoming state line are still visible while driving the current alignment of US 287. Big Ridge Way and CR 43F are segments of the original highway that are still in use.

== Junction list ==
County	Location	mi	km	Destinations	Notes
Baca		0.000	0.000	US 287 south / US 385 south / SH-3 east – Boise City	Continuation into Oklahoma
Baca	Springfield	28.777	46.312	US 160 – Trinidad, Johnson City	
Baca		40.772	65.616	SH 116 – Two Buttes, Lycan	
Prowers	Lamar	77.639	124.948	US 50 east / US 385 north (Olive Street) – Granada	Northern end of US 385 overlap; southern end of US 50 overlap
Prowers		85.188– 85.451	137.097– 137.520	US 50 west – La Junta	Interchange; northern end of US 50 overlap; left exit northbound, left entrance southbound
Prowers	Wiley	87.371	140.610	SH 196 – Kornman, McClave	
Kiowa		110.590	177.977	SH 96 east – Sheridan Lake	Southern end of SH 96 overlap
Kiowa	Eads	113.420	182.532	SH 96 west – Haswell	Northern end of SH 96 overlap
Cheyenne		133.240	214.429	US 40 east – Cheyenne Wells	Southern end of US 40 overlap
Cheyenne	Kit Carson	134.149	215.892	SH 59 – Seibert	
Cheyenne	Aroya	153.819	247.548	SH 94 – Colorado Springs	
Lincoln		193.281	311.056	I-70 BL begins / US 24 east / I-70	Southern end of I-70 Bus./US 24 overlap; I-70 exit 363
Lincoln	Limon	194.552	313.101	I-70 – Weigh Station	I-70 exit 361
Lincoln	Limon	194.950	313.742	SH 71 north (1st Street) – Brush	Eastern end of SH 71 overlap
Lincoln	Limon	196.007	315.443	SH 71 south (Indiana Avenue) – Ordway	Western end of SH 71 overlap
Lincoln	Limon	197.031	317.091	US 24 west – Colorado Springs	Northern end of US 24 overlap
Lincoln	Limon	197.579	317.973	I-70 BL ends / I-70 east – Weigh Station	Northern end of I-70 Bus. overlap; southern end of I-70 overlap; I-70 exit 359
See I-70
Arapahoe–Adams county line	Aurora	266.715	429.236	I-70 BL begins / I-70 (US 36) – Denver	Northern end of I-70 overlap; southern end of I-70 Bus. overlap; no southbound access to I-70 west; I-70 exit 288; serves Denver International Airport
Arapahoe	Aurora	272.516	438.572	I-225	I-225 exit 10
City and County of Denver		278.232	447.771	SH 2 (Colorado Boulevard)	
City and County of Denver		282.065	453.940	I-25 (US 6 / US 85 / US 87) / Auraria Parkway – Ft. Collins, Colorado Springs	I-25 exit 210A
City and County of Denver		282.700	454.962	SH 88 south (Federal Boulevard south)	Interchange
City and County of Denver		282.700	454.962	I-70 BL west / US 40 west (Colfax Avenue west)	Interchange; northern end of I-70 Bus./US 40 overlap
City and County of Denver		285.752	459.873	I-70 – Grand Junction	I-70 exit 272
Adams	Berkley	286.913	461.742	I-76 – Fort Morgan	I-76 exit 3
Adams	Westminster	289.367	465.691	US 36 (Denver-Boulder Turnpike) – Boulder, Denver	Interchange
Adams		294.711	474.291	SH 128 east (120th Avenue east)	Southern end of SH 128 overlap
City and County of Broomfield		298.100	479.745	SH 121 south / SH 128 west	Interchange; northern end of SH 128 overlap
Broomfield–Boulder county line	Broomfield–Lafayette line	300.886	484.229	Northwest Parkway	Northwest Parkway exit 52
Boulder	Lafayette	301.825	485.740	SH 42 west (Empire Road) – Louisville	
Boulder	Lafayette	304.273	489.680	SH 7 east (Baseline Road) – Brighton	Southern end of SH 7 overlap
Boulder	Lafayette	305.361	491.431	SH 7 west (Arapahoe Road) – Boulder	Northern end of SH 7 overlap
Boulder		310.390	499.524	SH 52 – Niwot, Dacono, Fort Lupton	
Boulder	Longmont	314.902	506.786	SH 119 (Ken Pratt Boulevard) to I-25 – Boulder	
Boulder	Longmont	318.326	512.296	SH 66 – Estes Park, Platteville, Ute Creek Golf Course	
Larimer	Berthoud	325.529	523.888	SH 56 east – Museum, Berthoud Business District	
Larimer	Campion	329.160	529.732	Berthoud	Interchange; southbound exit and northbound entrance, exit ramp includes direct entrance back onto US 287 north
Larimer	Campion	330.023	531.121	SH 60 east (SE 42nd Street)	
Larimer	Loveland	332.028	534.347	SH 402 east (14th Street SE)	
Larimer	Loveland	334.053	537.606	US 34 (Eisenhower Boulevard) – Estes Park, Greeley	Serves McKee Medical Center
Larimer	Fort Collins	339.128	545.774	SH 392 east (Carpenter Road) to I-25	
Larimer	Fort Collins	346.874	558.240	SH 14 east (Jefferson Street) to I-25 – Ault, Denver	Southern end of SH 14 overlap
Larimer	Fort Collins	348.635	561.074	SH 1 north (Terry Lake Road)	
Larimer		355.856	572.695	SH 14 west (Cache La Poudre-North Park Scenic Byway) – Walden, Poudre Canyon	Northern end of SH 14 overlap
Larimer		385.223	619.956	US 287 north – Laramie	Continuation into Wyoming
1.000 mi = 1.609 km; 1.000 km = 0.621 mi: Concurrency terminus; Incomplete access

== See also ==
- List of U.S. Highways in Colorado

U.S. Route 287
Previous state: Oklahoma	Colorado	Next state: Wyoming
