= Colorado State Highway 1 =

State highway in Colorado, United States

State Highway 1
- SH 1 highlighted in red

Route information
- Maintained by CDOT
- Length: 10.053 mi (16.179 km)
- Existed: 1923–present

Major junctions
- South end: US 287 / SH 14 in Fort Collins
- North end: I-25 / US 87 in Wellington

Location
- Country: United States
- State: Colorado
- Counties: Larimer

Highway system
- Colorado State Highway System; Interstate; US; State; Scenic
← US 650	→ SH 2

Colorado State Highway 1 (SH 1) is a 10.053-mile (16.179 km) state highway in Larimer County, Colorado, United States, that runs from U.S. Route 287 (US 287) / Colorado State Highway 14 (SH 14), just north of the city line of Fort Collins, northeast to Interstate 25 (I-25) / U.S. Route 87 (US 87) in Wellington.

== Route description ==
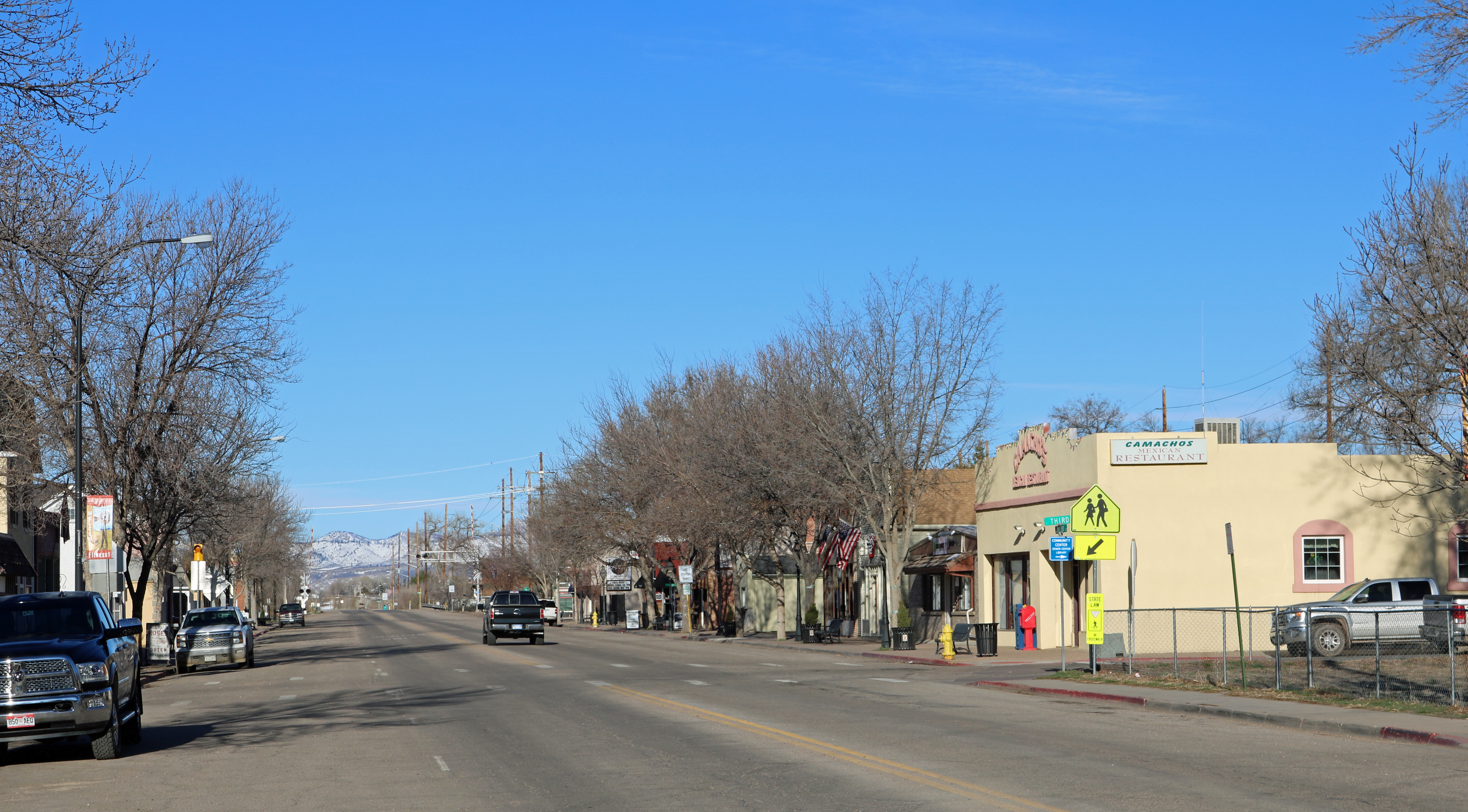
SH 1 in Wellington, March 2016

The road passes through an area of the Colorado Piedmont between Fort Collins and Wellington. It furnishes the principal road connection between those two communities and passes through a primarily suburban region north of Fort Collins, along the east side of Terry Lake, where it becomes Terry Lake Drive. Heading northward, it passes south of Waverly and the WWV radio towers, both visible from the road. In Wellington, it becomes Cleveland Avenue, a readily used route in that town. Although the area running aside the road was traditionally agricultural, it has been the site of rapid housing growth in recent years, particularly near Wellington.

== History ==
The route was numbered in 1923. During that time, it followed US 85 from New Mexico to I-25, continuing north along US 85 to Denver, and began as various roads throughout the city that merged. It then paralleled the current route of US 287 towards Fort Collins, then along its current alignment from Fort Collins to Wellington. From Wellington, it followed various roads back to the current I-25, where it continued north and terminated at the Wyoming border. By 1938, the entire route was paved as part of a major project. In 1954, a section north of Fort Collins was removed, leaving only the portion south of that point. In 1957, the portion north of Fort Collins was returned to the route. However, the entire portion from Fort Collins to the New Mexico border was closed in 1968. Since then, the routing has not significantly changed.

== Major intersections ==
The entire route is in Larimer County.

Location	mi	km	Destinations	Notes
Fort Collins	0.000	0.000	US 287 / SH 14 – Fort Collins, Colorado State University, Laramie	Southern terminus
Wellington	9.960	16.029	I-25 (US 87) – Fort Collins, Cheyenne	Diamond interchange; Exit 278 on I-25
Wellington	10.053	16.179	Frontage Road	Northern terminus
1.000 mi = 1.609 km; 1.000 km = 0.621 mi

== See also ==
- List of state highways in Colorado
- List of highways numbered 1
