= Colorado State Highway 402 =

State highway in Larimer County, Colorado, United States

State Highway 402
- Map of Larimer County in northern Colorado with SH 402 highlighted in red

Route information
- Maintained by CDOT
- Length: 4.2 mi (6.8 km)
- Existed: 1950–present

Major junctions
- West end: US 287 in Loveland
- East end: I-25 / US 87 in Johnstown

Location
- Country: United States
- State: Colorado
- Counties: Larimer

Highway system
- Colorado State Highway System; Interstate; US; State; Scenic
← SH 394	→ SH 470

State Highway 402 (SH 402) is a 4.2 mi (6.8 km) state highway in Larimer County, Colorado, United States, that connects U.S. Route 287 (US 287) Loveland with Interstate 25/US 87 (I-25/US 87) in Johnstown.

== Route description ==
The road begins at an intersection with US 287 in the southern part of Loveland. It begins as 14th Street SE through farmland along County Road 18 After intersecting County Road 9 and County Road 7, the road meets its east end at a dumbbell interchange with I-25/US 87, at exit 255.

== History ==
The route was numbered and established in 1950 by the Colorado Department of Transportation from U.S. Highway 287 to Interstate 25. Four years later, the road was entirely paved. Since its establishment, the route has not been majorly adjusted.

== Major intersections ==
The entire route is in Larimer County.

Location	mi	km	Destinations	Notes
Loveland	0.0	0.0	CR 18 west (14th Street SW)	Continuation west from western terminus
Loveland	0.0	0.0	US 287 north – Fort Collins, Laramie (Wyoming) US 287 south – Berthoud, Longmont	Western terminus
Johnstown	4.2	6.8	I-25 north (Dwight D. Eisenhower Highway) / US 87 north – Fort Collins, Cheyenne (Wyoming) I-25 south (Dwight D. Eisenhower Highway) / US 87 south – Campion, Denver	Eastern terminus; I-25 exit 255; dumbbell interchange
Johnstown	4.2	6.8	CR 18 east	Continuation east from eastern terminus
1.000 mi = 1.609 km; 1.000 km = 0.621 mi

== See also ==
- List of state highways in Colorado
