= Colorado Piedmont =

Geological area along the Front Range in Colorado, US

The Colorado Piedmont is an area along the base of the foothills of the Front Range in north central Colorado in the United States. The region consists of a broad hilly valley, under 6,600 feet (2,000 m) in elevation, stretching north and northeast from Denver in the valley of the South Platte River, as well as along the Arkansas River valley southward from Colorado Springs. The name Colorado Piedmont also refers to the physiographic section of the Great Plains province.

== Description ==
The Colorado Piedmont elevation is lower than the foothills, but is also slightly lower elevation than the High Plains to the east. According to current geologic theory, the Piedmont was formed approximately 28 million years ago, during the broad bowing of the North American Plate that lifted the continent between present-day Kansas and Utah to its present elevation of approximately 5000 ft (1500 m). This uplift resulted in increased streamflow and rapid erosion on the eastern side of the Rocky Mountains. The erosion scraped away the top layer of Upper Cretaceous sandstone (which still exists as the top layer on the High Plains), exposing the underlying layer of Pierre Shale, which had been formed during the Cretaceous, when a shallow sea covered present-day Colorado. It was during this time that the South Platte River, which had previously flowed eastward across the Plains, rerouted northward along the mountains to join the Cache la Poudre River. In some areas of the Piedmont, a loose veneer of Pleistocene gravel overlays older shale and which accumulated during glaciation in the mountains, when streams descending onto the Piedmont became overburdened with sediment.

The drop off from the Plains to the Piedmont is noticeable to motorists driving southward from Cheyenne, Wyoming on Interstate 25. At approximately Mile 293 northeast of Wellington, Colorado, near the Larimer-Weld county line, the road drops noticeably from the Upper Cretaceous sandstone of the Plains to the lower shale of the Piedmont. The transition from High Plains to Piedmont is likewise accompanied by a change in agriculture, from pasture lands on the Plains to cultivated fields in the Piedmont.

In the 19th century, the Piedmont region was inhabited primarily by the Southern Arapaho and Cheyenne tribes. From the earliest time of white settlement in the middle 19th century, the issue of water has been a controlling force in the economy of the region. The use of irrigation in the Piedmont starting in the 1860s led to widespread homesteading and cultivation of wheat and sugar beets, as well as cattle and sheep ranching. Much of the irrigation water in the Piedmont comes from shallow wells that tap the layers of Pleistocene gravel. Water diversion projects, locally from the Cache la Poudre and other rivers, as well as the Colorado-Big Thompson Project, also supply needed water to the region.

== See also ==
- Bibliography of Colorado
- Geography of Colorado
- History of Colorado
- Index of Colorado-related articles
- List of Colorado-related lists
- Outline of Colorado
