= Sheridan Boulevard =

Sheridan Boulevard may refer to:

- Colorado State Highway 95, a road near Denver.
- New York State Route 895, a road in the Bronx.
