= Dwight D. Eisenhower Highway (Colorado) =

Dwight D. Eisenhower Highway (Colorado) can refer to:

- Interstate 25 from Interstate 70 to Wyoming state line
- Interstate 70 from Interstate 25 to Kansas state line
