= Colorado State Highway 26 =

State highway in Colorado, United States

State Highway 26
- Alameda Avenue
- SH 26 highlighted in red

Route information
- Maintained by CDOT
- Length: 2.97 mi (4.78 km)

Major junctions
- West end: SH 95 in Denver
- East end: I-25 / US 85 in Denver

Location
- Country: United States
- State: Colorado
- Counties: Denver

Highway system
- Colorado State Highway System; Interstate; US; State; Scenic
← I-25	→ SH 30

State Highway 26 (SH 26) is a 3-mile (4.8 km) long state highway in Denver, Colorado, United States. It follows a portion of Alameda Avenue, stretching east from SH 95 (Sheridan Boulevard) at the west city limits to Kalamath Street within the Interstate 25 (I-25) and U.S. Route 85 (US 85) interchange (I-25 exit 208). It formerly continued west through Lakewood to US 40 near I-70 exit 259.

== Route description ==
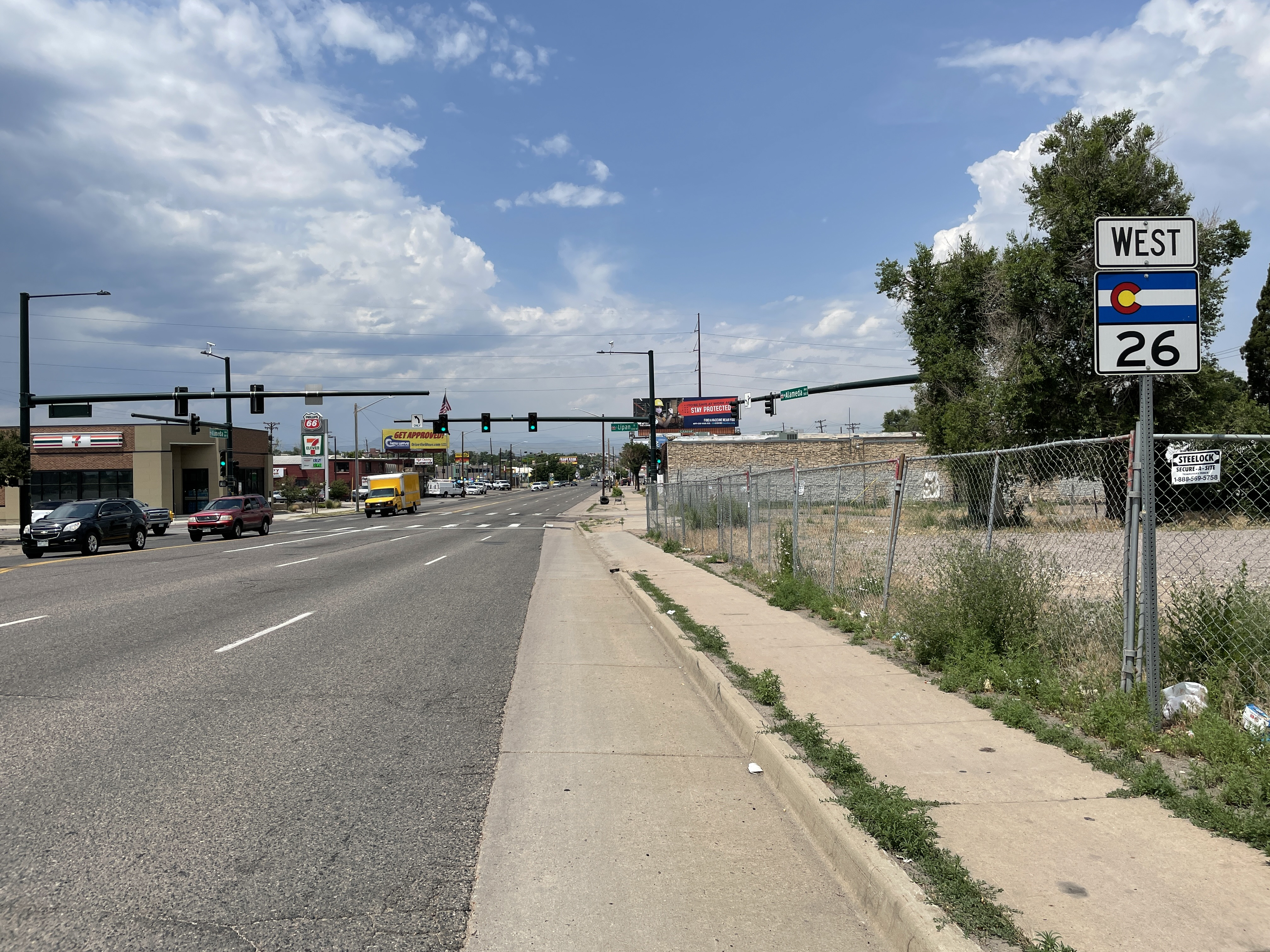
SH 26 westbound past the eastern terminus at the interchange with I-25/US 85/US 87 in Denver

SH 26 is a four-to-six lane surface road, beginning at SH 95 and crossing SH 88 (Federal Boulevard) midway. Approaching the east end, it crosses the South Platte River just before the interchange with I-25. Kalamath Street, the end of state maintenance, is one-way southbound, providing access to US 85 south and I-25 south. One block later, Santa Fe Drive (one-way northbound) carries traffic from US 85 north and I-25 north, and leads to the onramp to I-25 north.

== History ==
East of Morrison Road, Alameda Avenue was once part of SH 8, defined in 1923 along the modern US 285 corridor southwest of Denver. As part of a large expansion of the state highway system in 1938, existing SH 74 was extended from Morrison north along SH 93 (Hog Back Road) and east on Alameda Parkway and Alameda Avenue to end at Morrison Road. This extension was removed from the state highway system in 1953, along with most of the 1938 additions, but in 1966 it was restored as a new State Highway 26. Since the part of SH 93 along Hog Back Road had also been given back to the county in 1953, SH 26 went north from the west end of Alameda Parkway to end at US 40 just north of the present I-70 exit 259. SH 8 was removed from Morrison Road and Alameda Avenue in 1968-1969, giving SH 26 its maximum extent of about 14 miles (23 km) from US 40 to I-25.

The first chunk was removed from SH 26 in 1984, when the 3 miles (4.8 km) between SH 391 (Kipling Street) and SH 95 were given to the city of Lakewood. (SH 391 was simultaneously extended south from SH 26 to US 285.) The west segment was truncated to run only from US 40 to SH 470 between 1992 and 1997, and was eliminated entirely between 1999 and 2002. Alameda Parkway through Dinosaur Ridge between Hog Back Road and Rooney Road (west of SH 470) has since been closed to motor vehicles, but is open to bicycles and pedestrians as the Dinosaur Ridge Trail.

The Colorado Department of Transportation (CDOT) replaced the 112-year-old Alameda Bridge over I-25 and the South Platte River, and reconfigured the I-25 interchange. Construction on the $22.3 million project began in January 2023 and was completed in Summer 2025.

== Major intersections ==
The entire route is in Denver.

mi	km	Destinations	Notes
11.17	17.98	SH 95 (Sheridan Boulevard)	Western terminus
12.31	19.81	Morrison Road	
12.70	20.44	SH 88 (Federal Boulevard)	
14.14	22.76	Kalamath Street to I-25 south / US 85 south	Eastern terminus
1.000 mi = 1.609 km; 1.000 km = 0.621 mi
