= Interstate 25 in Colorado =

Section of Interstate Highway in Colorado, United States

Interstate 25
- I-25 and US 87 highlighted in red

Route information
- Maintained by CDOT
- Length: 298.87 mi (480.98 km)
- Existed: 1958–present
- NHS: Entire route

Major junctions
- South end: I-25 / US 85 / US 87 near Raton, NM
- US 160 from Trinidad to Walsenburg; US 50 in Pueblo; US 24 in Colorado Springs; I-225 in Denver; US 285 in Denver; US 40 / US 287 in Denver; I-70 / US 6 / US 85 in Denver; I-76 in North Washington; I-270 / US 36 in Welby; US 34 in Loveland
- North end: I-25 / US 87 near Wellington

Location
- Country: United States
- State: Colorado
- Counties: Las Animas, Huerfano, Pueblo, El Paso, Douglas, Arapahoe, Denver, Adams, Broomfield, Weld, Larimer

Highway system
- Interstate Highway System; Main; Auxiliary; Suffixed; Business; Future; Colorado State Highway System; Interstate; US; State; Scenic
| ← US 24 | I-25 | → SH 26 |
| ← SH 86 | US 87 | → SH 88 |

In the US state of Colorado, Interstate 25 (I-25) follows the north–south corridor through Colorado Springs and Denver. The highway enters the state from the north near Carr and exits the state near Starkville. The highway also runs through the cities of Fort Collins, Broomfield, Loveland, and Pueblo. The route is concurrent with U.S. Route 87 (US 87), which is unsigned, through the entire length of the state. I-25 replaced US 87 and most of US 85 for through traffic.

Historical nicknames for this route have included the Valley Highway (through Denver), Monument Valley Highway (through Colorado Springs), and the Pueblo Freeway (through Pueblo). Within El Paso County, the route has been dedicated as the Ronald Reagan Highway. In Pueblo County, the route is called John F. Kennedy Memorial Highway.

I-25 is also considered to be part of the unofficial Pan-American Highway.

== Route description ==
=== New Mexico state line to Pueblo ===
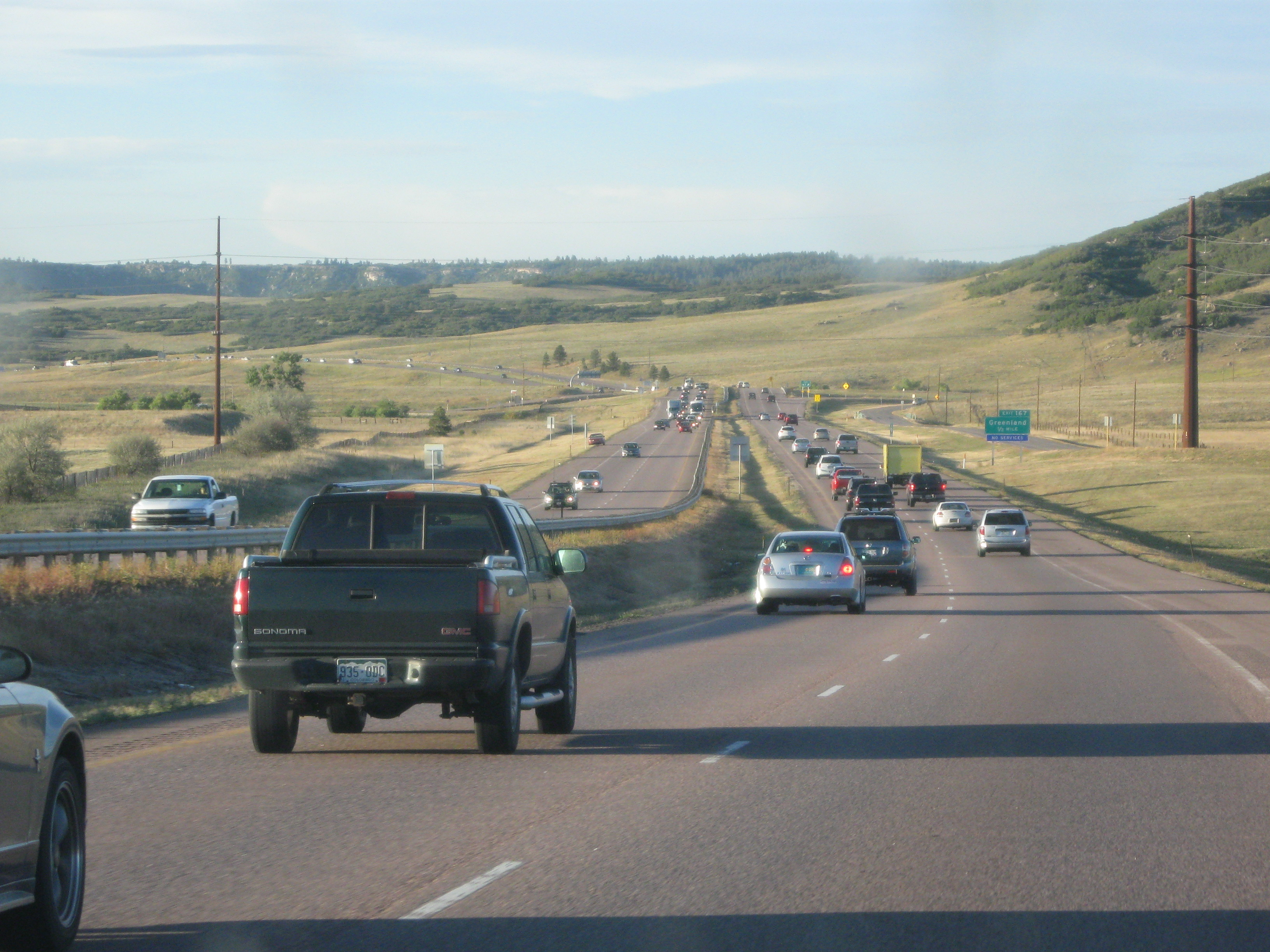
Northbound I-25 between Colorado Springs and Denver

Following the Santa Fe Trail from New Mexico, I-25 enters Colorado while concurrent with US 85 and US 87. It is a typical four-lane Interstate Highway, and its entire route in Colorado lies close to the east side of the Rocky Mountains. The route turns from north to west-northwest as I-25 serves Wootton. After leaving Wootton, I-25 turns back up north and bypasses near the east side of the Trinidad Lake State Park, home of the Trinidad Lake.

Trinidad, a city near the Trinidad Lake, is the first major city that lies along I-25. For the next 30 miles (48 km), I-25 continues north through the rural areas of Colorado until it reaches the small city of Walsenburg, where State Highway 25C (Interstate 25 Business, I-25 Bus.) junctions with US 160. I-25 then continues in a north-northwest direction until it bypasses the Orlando Reservoir, then turns north from there until it reaches Colorado City. In Colorado City, I-25 interchanges with the east end of the Frontier Pathways Scenic and Historic Byway (SH 165) at exit 74.

After leaving the city, I-25 follows in a north-northeast orientation until it reaches the St. Charles Reservoir just before entering the city of Pueblo, with the first exit within the southern city limits of Pueblo at exit 94. The Arkansas River in Pueblo serves as a feeder to the Lake Pueblo State Park, home of Pueblo Lake, which is located to the west of the western city limits of Pueblo.

=== Pueblo to Denver ===
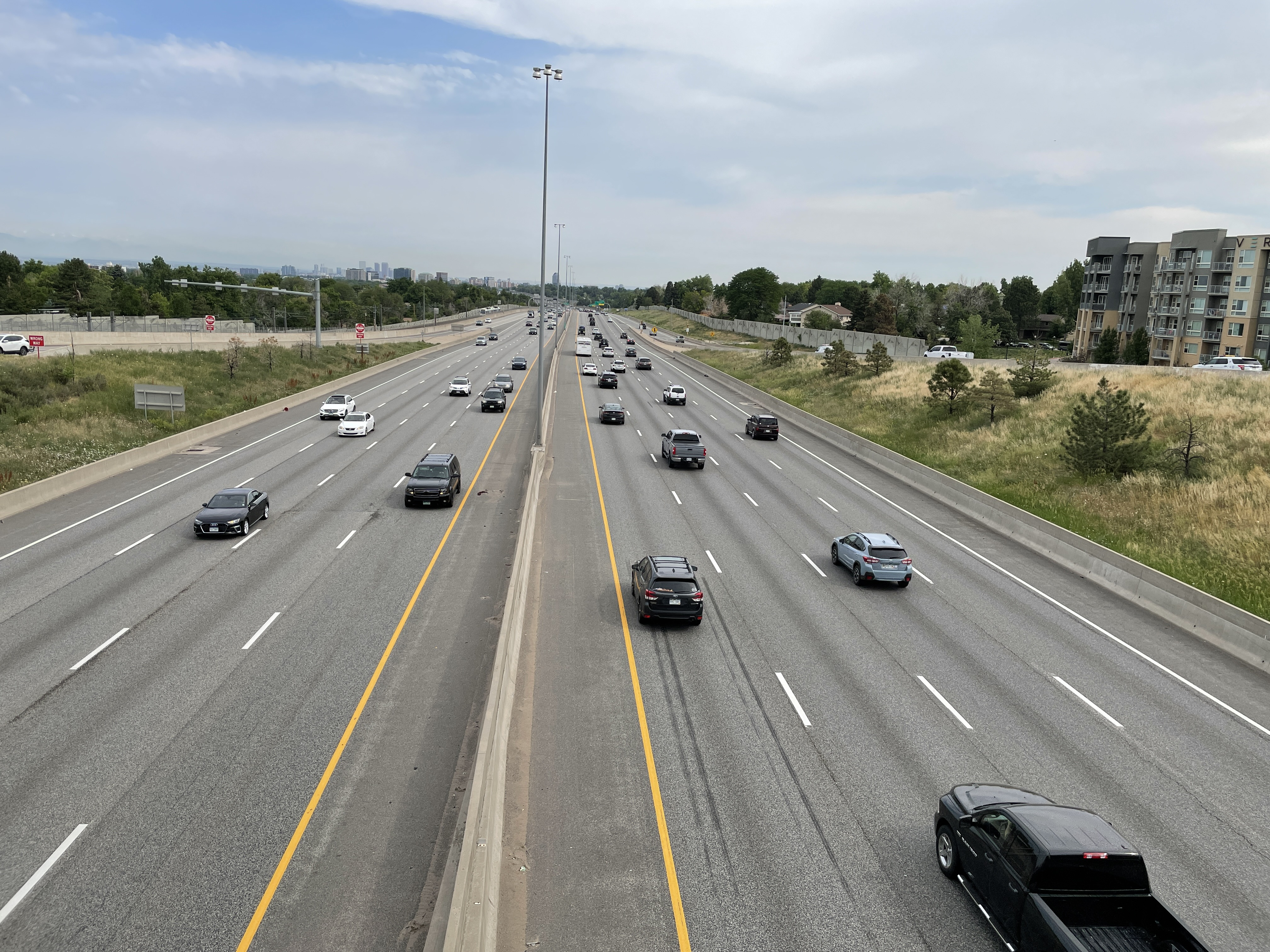
I-25 northbound at the US 285/SH 30 interchange in Denver

After leaving Pueblo, I-25 continues up north with the Union Pacific Railroad line paralleling closely to the route on the right side after interchanging with Porter Draw at exit 106. By exit 119, the Fountain Creek joins along and travels parallel with I-25, and continues all the way to the Fountain Creek Regional Park in Widefield. I-25 gradually turns from a general north direction to the north-northwest and serves the census-designated place of Buttes at exit 122.

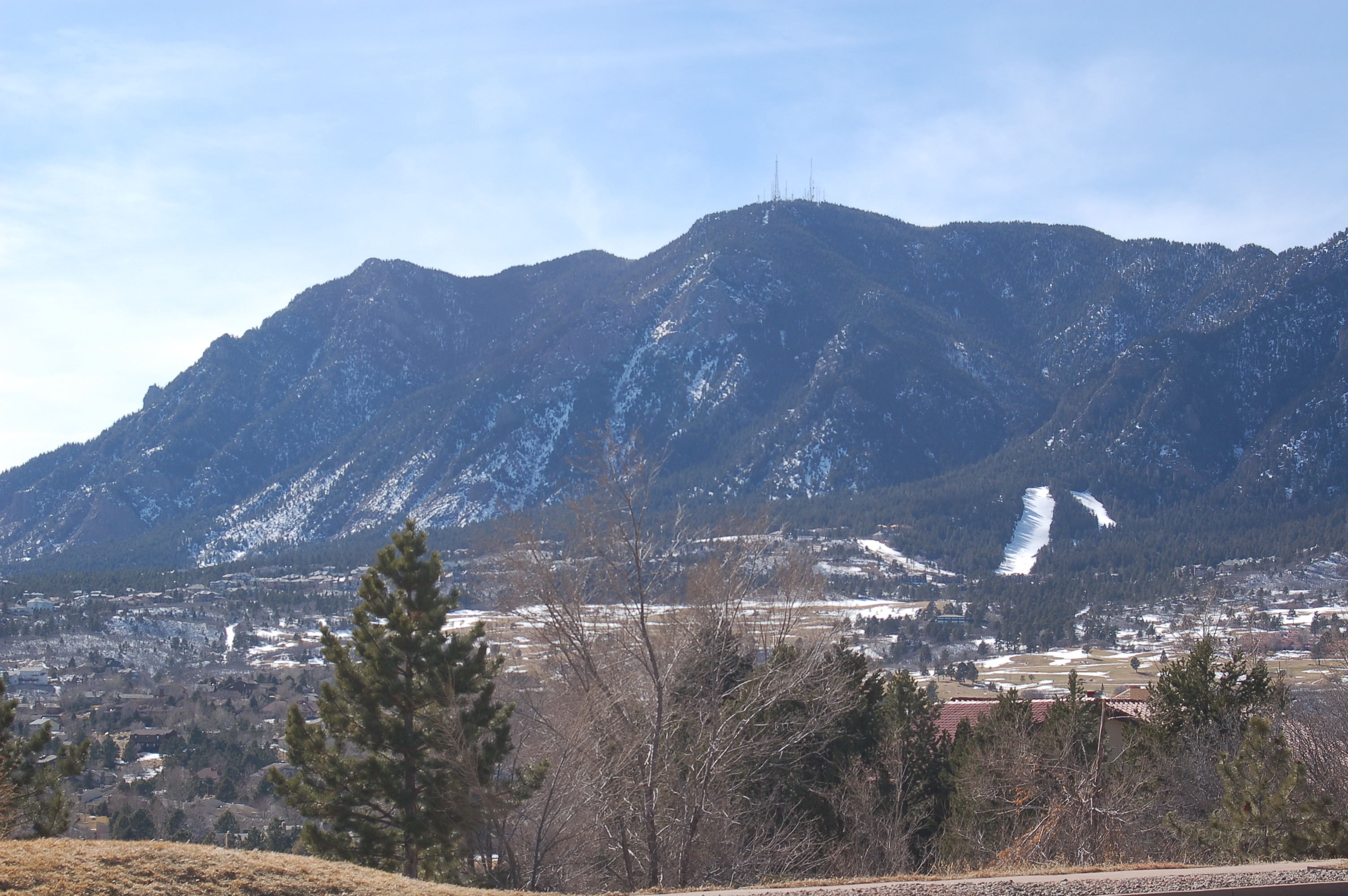
Cheyenne Mountain, as seen from I-25 near Fort Carson. Note the communications antennas at the summit, which are radio antennas for stations broadcasting in Colorado Springs.

As soon as US 85 leaves I-25 at exit 128, I-25 enters the city limits of Fountain. Basically, I-25 serves as the border between the western city limits of Fountain on the east side of I-25 and Fort Carson on the west side. Exit 132 (SH 16) serves the north side of the Fountain Creek Regional Park as well as the entrance to Fort Carson and connects to SH 21 (Powers Boulevard), the eastern bypass for the Colorado Springs metro area. By the time I-25 reaches exit 138, the route crosses into the city limits of Colorado Springs, where the stack interchange with US 24 at exit 139 serves the Evergreen Cemetery and Prospect Lake. I-25 turns west at exit 140, along with Fountain Creek, where it interchanges with US 85, US 87, and State Highway 25 Business (State Highway 25 Bus., I-25 Bus.). I-25, again, turns back north by exit 141. Swinging around the west side of downtown Colorado Springs at exit 142, and to the north of the city lies the Colorado College, and is served at exit 143 (Uintah Street). Continuing north and northeast, the highway intersects the north terminus of State Highway 25 Bus. and US 85. The Interstate leaves Colorado Springs between exits 153 and 156, where I-25 enters the United States Air Force Academy, going through the east side of the institution.

Map showing I-25 and nearby freeways and major highways in the Denver Metropolitan area

I-25 leaves El Paso County and enters Douglas County at Monument Hill, elevation 7,352 ft (2,241 m), north of Monument. I-25 then continues north through more rural and hilly areas east of the Rocky Mountains until reaching Castle Rock at exit 181. I-25 continues through rural and hilly portions of Douglas County until intersecting E-470, the partial beltway of Denver serving the Centennial Airport and the Denver International Airport.

After entering Arapahoe County, I-25 cuts through the Denver Technological Center (DTC) between Dry Creek Road and Belleview Avenue (exits 196 and 199). I-25 enters Denver at the I-225 interchange, a spur that detours motorists to I-70 through Aurora, at exit 200. I-25 turns in a westerly direction between Evans Avenue (exit 203) and Colorado Boulevard (exit 204). University of Denver lies just to the south of the Interstate at exit 205. It then turns back north after exit 207. I-25 curves around the west side of downtown Denver, where it can be accessed by I-70 Bus. at exit 210. I-25 then interchanges with I-70 at exit 214 right before leaving the City and County of Denver and enters Adams County.

=== Denver to Wyoming state line ===
As I-25 leaves Denver, the route continues up north through unincorporated areas of Adams County and interchanges with I-76, I-270, and the Denver-Boulder Turnpike (US 36). Due to the complexity of this triangle-shaped interchange, it was known to be one of many malfunction junctions throughout the United States. Beyond that interchange, the Interstate enters the northern suburbs of the Denver metro area, such as Thornton and Northglenn, and at exit 220, I-25 slips its way through a narrow path between the Badding Reservoir (west side) and the Croke Lake (east side).

At exit 228, I-25 interchanges with the northern terminuses of E-470 and Northwest Parkway at a stack interchange, with the Larkridge Shopping Center just to the north, served by 160th Avenue (SH 7). As I-25 continues north, it moves through rolling farm and grasslands with the Front Range and high mountains clearly visible to the west while passing through a medley of lakes and reservoirs. It stays generally flat with few moderate climbs in elevation, while also serving smaller cities like Dacono and Firestone to the east and Longmont to the west. This stretch of I-25 in northern Colorado also has large amounts of truck traffic between SH 7 and Wyoming. After some time in the rural farmlands, the Interstate enters the Fort Collins–Loveland metro area at exit 255, serving Loveland and Greeley at exits 255 and 257, Windsor at exit 262, and continuing north to the Fort Collins city limits south of Harmony Road. The highway runs on the eastern side of Fort Collins, serving Colorado State University at exits 268 and 269 (which is also the most direct route to downtown). After exit 271, I-25 leaves Fort Collins and rolls into more rural grasslands past Wellington. Exits also become few and far between from here to Wyoming as well after gradually turning north-easterly toward the state line.

== History ==
=== Construction ===
==== Ancestors and early freeways ====
Colorado had begun planning of a modern intercity route along the Front Range as early as 1944, well before the national movement toward an Interstate Highway system.

SH 1, an unpaved road, was completed between Denver and Pueblo by 1919. Average travel time between Pueblo and Colorado Springs on this route was approximately 2.5 hours (or a full 8.5 hours from Pueblo to Denver). This route was upgraded with the help of the federal government to become US 85 and US 87 by 1930, now paved in concrete and shortening the travel time between Pueblo and Colorado Springs to just one hour.

The cities of Denver (in 1948) and Pueblo (in 1949) were first to begin building multilane highway segments along the route of what would eventually become I-25. Construction follows an earlier segment of the Colorado and Southern Railway. Denver's segment was originally known as the Valley Highway and was completed by 1958. The city of Colorado Springs followed a similar theme with their Monument Valley Freeway, begun in 1955 and completed by July 1960. Pueblo's section—the Pueblo Freeway—was complete by July 1959.

The original alignment of SH-185, north of Wellington is still visible while on Southbound I-25 at the Colorado-Wyoming Border, as well as on Larimer County Roads 82 and 92, just West of I-25. Larimer County Road 7 and 5J follow the former SH-185 alignment, North of Wellington.

==== Interstate completion ====
I-25 northbound in Lone Tree

As the national Interstate Highway System began to take shape, actual "interstate" connections began to be made. Wyoming came first in 1964, building a nine-mile (14 km) link north to Cheyenne that was connected to Colorado's 17-mile (27 km) stretch.

Linking to New Mexico in the south would prove more problematic as the planned route had to stretch over Raton Pass, and its accompanying 1,800-foot (550 m) elevation change, within just 13 mi (21 km). Once again, US 85 and US 87 were used, but it had to be regraded in places to meet Interstate design guidelines. Construction began in 1960, with a link to the city of Trinidad completed by 1963. The Trinidad Segment (as CDOT now calls the Raton Pass span) was not fully completed until 1968.

The final segment of the Colorado portion of I-25, connecting the cities of Walsenburg and Trinidad, was completed in 1969. This meant that four lanes of high-speed, nonstop freeway were finally open for a full 305 miles (491 km) from New Mexico north to Wyoming.

==== Improvements and expansion ====
As both population and traffic increased in Colorado during the 1990s and 2000s, the Colorado Department of Transportation has planned and completed major improvements for the city corridors along I-25.

===== T-REX (Denver) =====
T-REX Logo

The first of these was Transportation Expansion (T-REX), which widened and expanded nearly 17 miles (27 km) of both I-25 and the I-225 bypass in the Denver Metropolitan Area as well as adding various pedestrian and aesthetic improvements. T-REX was also instrumental in expanding Denver's RTD light rail lines to connect outlying communities beyond the city and county of Denver, adding 19 miles (31 km) of new routes.

Starting in early 2004, the T-REX project was completed during 2006 at a cost of $1.67 billion, under its projected budget and two years ahead of its originally scheduled conclusion. It has been hailed as a "model for other cities to follow" and "ahead of the curve nationally" by federal transportation and transit authorities.

===== COSMIX (Colorado Springs) =====
COSMIX Logo

As T-REX began to wrap up, CDOT's next major effort began with Colorado Springs Metro Interstate Expansion (COSMIX). It could be argued that COSMIX was even more important to Colorado's interests than T-REX had been, since the Colorado Springs corridor of I-25 had seen immense growth over the past four decades, and experienced major choke points all along the 16-mile (26 km) corridor from exit 135 (Academy Boulevard) in the south to exit 151 (Briargate Parkway) in the north. Originally carrying around 8500 vehicles per day in 1960, usage of the former Monument Valley Freeway had grown to an average of 100,000 vehicles per day by 2005.

The major goals of COSMIX, which began in 2005 and was completed a year and four days ahead of schedule at the very end of December 2007, were a general expansion and widening of the corridor to three lanes in each direction throughout the city, as well as the reconstruction of two main interchanges (at Bijou Street near downtown Colorado Springs, and at Rockrimmon Boulevard and North Nevada Avenue in the city's growing north side). Originally estimated at $225 million, on delivery, COSMIX cost only $150 million, approximately $20 million of which involved land acquisition costs.

COSMIX was the first funded portion of a larger plan for I-25 improvements as detailed in an Environmental Assessment approved by CDOT and FHWA in 2004. A second phase resulted in the widening of the 12-mile (19 km) segment from Woodmen Road (exit 149) to Monument (exit 161) to six lanes and addition of auxiliary lanes at busy interchanges. The Air Force Academy interchange (exit 156) was reconfigured to include just one exit, instead of A/B, and features two new roundabouts for North Gate Boulevard. The widening and paving was completed in December 2014.

An EA-recommended improvement not included in COSMIX due to funding limitations was the reconstruction of the I-25 interchange at Cimarron Street (US 24 West). CDOT completed this project in late 2017.

===== Greenland Wildlife Overpass =====
In 2025, the largest wildlife overpass in North America was added over Interstate 25 in Douglas County. The overpass connects 39,000 acres of habitat. It is 200 feet wide and 209 feet long.

It is estimated that the Greenland Wildlife Overpass will reduce wildlife-vehicle crashes, which average one per day during migrations seasons, by 90%.

=== Accidents and incidents ===
In 1996, Seymour Cray was mortally wounded in a rollover accident while merging onto the highway at the North Academy Boulevard interchange. Cray's death renewed calls to replace the cloverleaf interchange with an alternative design without weave zones.

In 2015 in April and May various shootings were tentatively linked as sniper attacks although Christopher Parker was later only sentenced the murder of William Connole.

On October 11, 2023, a freight train derailed on a bridge over Interstate 25 in Pueblo, Colorado. As a result, several train cars fell onto the highway causing the bridge to collapse, 1 person was killed and 1 person was injured.

On June 8, 2024, renowned comic book YouTuber Ben Potter, also known as Comicstorian, was killed in an accident on the interstate, when his vehicle veered off the right side of the road, crossed a frontage road, and rolled multiple times. His death—while under investigation—shook up the comic book community, and invoked calls for further measures to ensure public safety on the highway.

== Future ==
As of October 2020, a seven-mile (11 km) segment of I-25 through Pueblo is currently being upgraded. Enhancements include the widening of two bridges, noise wall installation, the softening of curves for better safety, and the addition of acceleration and deceleration lanes. The $69 million project has been completed.

There is much controversy surrounding the future of I-25 in northern Colorado (SH 7 in Broomfield to SH 14 in Fort Collins). Suggestions from adding toll lanes to general expansion to six lanes from the two-lane bottleneck at SH 66 to SH 14 and adding multimodal transportation options have been discussed. The future of the highway remains in question as funding is limited, and agreement is limited as well. The I-25 corridor in Weld and Larimer counties is becoming increasingly heavy with traffic, and something will have to be done soon.

In Colorado Springs, SH 21 (Powers Boulevard) is currently getting extended past SH 83 to its official northern terminus at I-25. This project provides an easier bypass around the north end of the town and will also help connect Voyager Pkwy traffic to the Interstate. Powers Boulevard will eventually become a freeway bypass of the Colorado Springs metro area. The construction is in two phases, I-25 is involved in phase 1, where a new directional T-interchange (Y-interchange) will be built near exit 156 at North Gate Boulevard between milemarkers 149 and 151. The interchange was completed in summer 2021.

The Gap is an 18-mile (29 km) stretch of I-25 from south of Castle Rock to Monument, in both Douglas and El Paso counties. It is the only four-lane section of I-25 between Colorado's two largest cities, Denver and Colorado Springs. Over the years, congestion, crashes, and delays have grown due to population growth and more people using the road. Efforts to improve these conditions are underway, and the project is completed with a cost of $350 million, with contributions from Douglas and El Paso counties, Pikes Peak Rural Transportation Authority and a federal INFRA grant.

== Exit list ==
| County | Location | mi | km | Exit | Destinations | Notes |
|---|---|---|---|---|---|---|
| Colorado–New Mexico line | | 0.000 | 0.000 | | I-25 south (US 85 south / US 87 east) / Santa Fe National Historic Trail – Raton | Continuation into New Mexico |
| Colorado–New Mexico line | | 0.000 | 0.000 | 460 | Truck weigh station | Northbound entrance extends into Colorado; exit number based on New Mexico mileage |
| Las Animas | | 2.134 | 3.434 | 2 | Wootton | |
| Las Animas | | 5.597 | 9.007 | 6 | Gallinas | |
| Las Animas | | 7.529 | 12.117 | 8 | Spring Creek | |
| Las Animas | | 11.013 | 17.724 | 11 | Starkville – Trinidad Lake State Park, Fishers Peak State Park | |
| Las Animas | Trinidad | 13.000 | 20.921 | 13A | Van Buren Street | Northbound exit and southbound entrance |
| Las Animas | Trinidad | 13.311 | 21.422 | 13B | SH 12 west (Main Street) / Santa Fe Trail / Highway of Legends – Trinidad State College | |
| Las Animas | Trinidad | 13.906 | 22.380 | 14 | Commercial Street – Downtown Trinidad | |
| Las Animas | Trinidad | 14.859 | 23.913 | 15 | US 160 east (Kit Carson Trail) / SH 239 north to US 350 / Goddard Avenue – La Junta | South end of US 160 overlap |
| Las Animas | | 17.728 | 28.530 | 18 | El Moro Road | |
| Las Animas | | 22.906 | 36.864 | 23 | CR 42 (Hoehne Road) | |
| Las Animas | | 26.858 | 43.224 | 27 | Ludlow | |
| Las Animas | | 30.464 | 49.027 | 30 | Aguilar Road | |
| Las Animas | | 34.090 | 54.863 | 34 | I-25 BS / Highway of Legends – Aguilar | |
| Huerfano | | 40.485 | 65.154 | 41 | Rugby Road | |
| Huerfano | | 41.930 | 67.480 | 42 | Rouse Road | |
| Huerfano | Walsenburg | 49.000 | 78.858 | 49 | I-25 BL north to US 160 west / Highway of Legends – Walsenburg, Alamosa, Great Sand Dunes National Park and Preserve, Lathrop State Park, San Luis Valley | North end of US 160 overlap |
| Huerfano | Walsenburg | 50.054 | 80.554 | 50 | SH 10 east – La Junta | |
| Huerfano | Walsenburg | 52.321 | 84.202 | 52 | I-25 BL north to US 160 west / SH 69 north / SH 12 west / Highway of Legends – Walsenburg, Gardner, Westcliffe, La Veta, Great Sand Dunes National Park and Preserve, Lathrop State Park | |
| Huerfano | | 55.000 | 88.514 | 55 | Airport Road | |
| Huerfano | | 56.000 | 90.123 | 56 | Redrock Road | |
| Huerfano | | 58.727 | 94.512 | 59 | Butte Road | |
| Huerfano | | 60.084 | 96.696 | 60 | Huerfano | |
| Huerfano | | 64.046 | 103.072 | 64 | CR 650 (Lascar Road) | |
| Huerfano | | 66.749 | 107.422 | 67 | Apache | |
| Pueblo | Colorado City | 71.264 | 114.688 | 71 | Graneros Road | |
| Pueblo | Colorado City | 74.367 | 119.682 | 74 | SH 165 west – Colorado City, Rye, San Isabel | |
| Pueblo | | 77.267 | 124.349 | 77 | Abbey Road, Hatchet Ranch Road | |
| Pueblo | | 83.461 | 134.317 | 83 | Brantzell | |
| Pueblo | | 86.938 | 139.913 | 87 | Verde Road | |
| Pueblo | | 87.921 | 141.495 | 88 | Burnt Mill Road | |
| Pueblo | | 90.625 | 145.847 | 91 | Stem Beach | |
| Pueblo | Pueblo | 94.769 | 152.516 | 94 | SH 45 north (Pueblo Boulevard) | |
| Pueblo | Pueblo | 95.403 | 153.536 | 95 | Illinois Avenue | Southbound exit only |
| Pueblo | Pueblo | 95.901 | 154.338 | 96 | Minnequa Avenue, Indiana Avenue | Southbound exit to Minnequa Avenue, one block north of Indiana Avenue; Northbound exit to and entrance from Indiana Avenue; Southbound entrance from Aqua Avenue, one block south of Indiana Avenue |
| Pueblo | Pueblo | 96.673 | 155.580 | 97A | McCulley Avenue to Northern Avenue | |
| Pueblo | Pueblo | 97.447 | 156.826 | 97B | Abriendo Avenue | |
| Pueblo | Pueblo | 97.691 | 157.218 | 98A | US 50 Bus. (Santa Fe Avenue) | |
| Pueblo | Pueblo | 98.545 | 158.593 | 98B | To SH 96 / City Center Drive | |
| Pueblo | Pueblo | 98.806 | 159.013 | 99A | To SH 96 / 6th Street | Southbound exit and northbound entrance (from Bradford Avenue) |
| Pueblo | Pueblo | 99.334 | 159.863 | 99B | 13th Street | South end of US 50 Bus. overlap |
| Pueblo | Pueblo | 99.950 | 160.854 | 100A | US 50 east – La Junta, Pueblo Memorial Airport | South end of US 50 overlap; western terminus of US 50 Bus. |
| Pueblo | Pueblo | 100.681 | 162.030 | 100B | 29th Street | |
| Pueblo | Pueblo | 101.389 | 163.170 | 101 | US 50 west / SH 47 east – Cañon City | North end of US 50 overlap |
| Pueblo | Pueblo | 102.160 | 164.411 | 102 | Eagleridge Boulevard | |
| Pueblo | Pueblo | 103.510 | 166.583 | 104 | Dillon Drive, Drew Dix Parkway | |
| Pueblo | | 106.075 | 170.711 | 106 | Porter Draw | |
| Pueblo | | 108.000 | 173.809 | 108 | Purcell Boulevard – Pueblo West | |
| Pueblo | | 110.238 | 177.411 | 110 | Pinon | |
| Pueblo | | 114.000 | 183.465 | 114 | Young Hollow | |
| Pueblo | | 115.831 | 186.412 | 116 | County Line Road | |
| El Paso | | 118.843 | 191.259 | 119 | Rancho Colorado Boulevard | |
| El Paso | | 121.459 | 195.469 | 122 | Pikes Peak International Raceway | |
| El Paso | | 123.189 | 198.253 | 123 | Clear Spring Ranch | Exit does not sign this destination |
| El Paso | | 124.564 | 200.466 | 125 | Ray Nixon Road | |
| El Paso | Fountain | 127.860 | 205.771 | 128 | Fountain | |
| El Paso | Fountain | 131.653 | 211.875 | 132 | SH 16 east (Mesa Ridge Parkway) to SH 21 – Fort Carson Gate 20 | Signed as exits 132A (SH 16) and 132B (Ft. Carson) southbound |
| El Paso | Stratmoor | 135.262 | 217.683 | 135 | South Academy Boulevard – Colorado Springs Airport | |
| El Paso | Colorado Springs | 137.752 | 221.690 | 138 | Lake Avenue, Circle Drive | |
| El Paso | Colorado Springs | 138.742 | 223.284 | 139 | US 24 east (Martin Luther King Jr. Bypass) – Limon | South end of US 24 overlap |
| El Paso | Colorado Springs | 139.747– 139.869 | 224.901– 225.097 | 140 | SH 115 south (Nevada Avenue, Tejon Street) / US 85 – Cañon City | |
| El Paso | Colorado Springs | 141.139 | 227.141 | 141 | US 24 west (Cimarron Street) – Manitou Springs, Pikes Peak | North end of US 24 overlap |
| El Paso | Colorado Springs | 141.849 | 228.284 | 142 | Bijou Street – Downtown Colorado Springs | |
| El Paso | Colorado Springs | 142.832 | 229.866 | 143 | Uintah Street | |
| El Paso | Colorado Springs | 143.520 | 230.973 | 144 | Centennial Boulevard | |
| El Paso | Colorado Springs | 144.622 | 232.747 | 145 | Fillmore Street | Diverging diamond interchange |
| El Paso | Colorado Springs | 146.074 | 235.083 | 146 | Garden of the Gods Road | |
| El Paso | Colorado Springs | 147.245– 148.030 | 236.968– 238.231 | 148 | Nevada Avenue, Corporate Drive, Rockrimmon Boulevard | |
| El Paso | Colorado Springs | 148.830 | 239.519 | 149 | Woodmen Road | |
| El Paso | Colorado Springs | 150.303 | 241.889 | 150 | North Academy Boulevard | |
| El Paso | Colorado Springs | 151.660 | 244.073 | 151 | Briargate Parkway | |
| El Paso | Colorado Springs | 152.899 | 246.067 | 153 | To SH 21 (Powers Boulevard) / Interquest Parkway – Black Forest | |
| El Paso | Colorado Springs | | | 155 | Voyager Parkway | Future northern terminus for SH 21/Powers Blvd. Temporarily signed for Voyager Parkway |
| El Paso | Air Force Academy | 155.930 | 250.945 | 156 | North Gate Boulevard – North Entrance Air Force Academy | |
| El Paso | | 158.199 | 254.597 | 158 | Baptist Road | |
| El Paso | Monument | 160.763 | 258.723 | 161 | SH 105 / 2nd Street – Monument, Palmer Lake | |
| El Paso–Douglas county line | | 163.321 | 262.840 | 163 | County Line Road – Palmer Lake | |
| Douglas | | 167.464 | 269.507 | 167 | Greenland | |
| Douglas | | 171.820 | 276.517 | 172 | Upper Lake Gulch Road | |
| Douglas | | 172.307 | 277.301 | 173 | Larkspur | Southbound exit and northbound entrance |
| Douglas | | 173.791 | 279.690 | 174 | Tomah Road | |
| Douglas | Castle Rock | 178.75 | 287.67 | 179 | Crystal Valley Parkway | Future interchange |
| Douglas | Castle Rock | 180.808 | 290.982 | 181 | Plum Creek Parkway | |
| Douglas | Castle Rock | 181.853 | 292.664 | 182 | Wilcox Street, Wolfensberger Road | |
| Douglas | Castle Rock | 184.212 | 296.460 | 184 | US 85 north (Meadows Parkway) / SH 86 east (Founders Parkway) – Littleton, Franktown | North end of US 85 overlap |
| Douglas | Castle Rock | 185.097 | 297.885 | 185 | Castle Rock Parkway to North Meadows Drive | |
| Douglas | Castle Pines | 186.935 | 300.843 | 187 | Happy Canyon Road | |
| Douglas | Castle Pines | 188.486 | 303.339 | 188 | Castle Pines Parkway | |
| Douglas | Lone Tree | 192.096 | 309.149 | 192 | RidgeGate Parkway | |
| Douglas | Lone Tree | 192.990 | 310.587 | 193 | Lincoln Avenue | |
| Douglas | Lone Tree | 194.314 | 312.718 | 194 | SH 470 west / E-470 north – Grand Junction, Limon | Eastern terminus and exit 26 on SH-470; southern terminus and exit 1A on E-470; access to Denver International Airport |
| Douglas–Arapahoe county line | Lone Tree–Centennial line | 195.130 | 314.031 | 195 | County Line Road | |
| Arapahoe | Centennial | 196.141 | 315.658 | 196 | Dry Creek Road | |
| Arapahoe | Greenwood Village | 197.188 | 317.343 | 197 | SH 88 east (Arapahoe Road) | South end of SH 88 overlap |
| Arapahoe | Greenwood Village | 198.292 | 319.120 | 198 | Orchard Road | |
| Arapahoe | Greenwood Village | 199.384 | 320.877 | 199 | SH 88 west (Belleview Avenue) | North end of SH 88 overlap |
| City and County of Denver | | 200.093 | 322.018 | 200 | I-225 north to I-70 – Limon, Aurora | I-225 exits 1A-B southbound; tri-stack interchange; access to Denver International Airport |
| City and County of Denver | | 201.578 | 324.408 | 201 | US 285 south / SH 30 east (Hampden Avenue) | |
| City and County of Denver | | 202.640 | 326.117 | 202 | Yale Avenue | |
| City and County of Denver | | 203.537 | 327.561 | 203 | Evans Avenue | |
| City and County of Denver | | 204.037 | 328.366 | 204 | SH 2 (Colorado Boulevard) | |
| City and County of Denver | | 205.057 | 330.007 | 205 | University Boulevard | |
| City and County of Denver | | 205.919 | 331.395 | 206 | Downing Street, Washington Street, Emerson Street | Downing Street not signed southbound |
| City and County of Denver | | | | 207A | Lincoln Street, Broadway | Lincoln Street not signed southbound |
| City and County of Denver | | | | 207B | Santa Fe Drive to SH 26 (Alameda Avenue) | Northbound exit and southbound entrance |
| City and County of Denver | | | | 207B | US 85 south (Santa Fe Drive) | South end of US 85 overlap; southbound exit and northbound entrance |
| City and County of Denver | | 207.641– 207.990 | 334.166– 334.727 | 208 | SH 26 (Alameda Avenue) | Southbound exit and northbound entrance; northbound access is via exit 207B |
| City and County of Denver | | 209.210 | 336.691 | 209 | US 6 west (6th Avenue) – Lakewood | South end of US 6 overlap; signed as exits 209A (east) and 209B (west) |
| City and County of Denver | | 209.479 | 337.124 | 209C | 8th Avenue | |
| City and County of Denver | | 210.310 | 338.461 | 210A | US 40 / US 287 (Colfax Avenue) – Downtown Denver | |
| City and County of Denver | | 210.415 | 338.630 | 210B | Auraria Parkway | Northbound exit and southbound entrance |
| City and County of Denver | | 210.532 | 338.818 | 210C | 17th Avenue | Northbound exit and entrance; southbound access is via exit 211 |
| City and County of Denver | | 211.109 | 339.747 | 211 | 23rd Avenue, 20th Avenue | 20th Avenue not signed northbound |
| City and County of Denver | | 211.464 | 340.318 | 212A-B | Speer Boulevard – Downtown Denver | Signed as exits 212A (south) and 212B (north) |
| City and County of Denver | | 212.096 | 341.335 | 212C | 20th Street | |
| City and County of Denver | | | | ♦ | I-25 Express (HOV/toll lanes) | South end of reversible HOV/toll lanes |
| City and County of Denver | | | | ♦ | 19th Street | Southbound exit and northbound entrance for HOV/toll lanes only |
| City and County of Denver | | 212.769 | 342.419 | 213 | Park Avenue, West 38th Avenue | Access to Coors Field |
| City and County of Denver | | 213.625– 213.739 | 343.796– 343.980 | 214A | I-70 (US 6 east/US 85 north) – Limon, Grand Junction | North end of US 6/US 85 overlap; locally known as The Mousetrap; exit 274 on I-70; access to Denver International Airport via I-70 east |
| City and County of Denver | | 213.964 | 344.342 | 214B | 48th Avenue | Southbound exit only |
| Adams | North Washington | 215.244 | 346.402 | 215 | SH 53 north (58th Avenue) | |
| Adams | North Washington | 216.301 | 348.103 | 216A | I-76 east – Fort Morgan | Northbound exit and southbound entrance; exit 5 on I-76 |
| Adams | Welby | 216.397– 216.779 | 348.257– 348.872 | 216B | SH 224 (70th Avenue) / I-76 west – Grand Junction | Signed as exit 216 southbound; SH 224 not signed southbound; exit 5 on I-76 |
| Adams | Welby | | | ♦ | SH 224 (70th Avenue) | Northbound exit and southbound right entrance for HOV/toll lanes only |
| Adams | Welby | 217.006 | 349.237 | 217 | I-270 east / US 36 – Limon, Aurora, Westminster, Boulder | No northbound access to I-270; southbound signed as exits 217A (west) and 217B (east); western terminus and exit 0 on I-270; access to Denver International Airport |
| Adams | Welby | | | ♦ | US 36 west – Boulder | Southbound right exit and northbound entrance for HOV/toll lanes only |
| Adams | Welby | | | ♦ | I-25 Express (HOV/toll lanes) | North end of reversible HOV/toll lanes |
| Adams | Thornton | 218.463 | 351.582 | 219 | 84th Avenue – Federal Heights | |
| Adams | Thornton | 219.815 | 353.758 | 220 | Thornton Parkway | |
| Adams | Northglenn | 221.027 | 355.708 | 221 | 104th Avenue | Former SH 44 |
| Adams | Northglenn | 223.049 | 358.963 | 223 | SH 128 west (120th Avenue) | |
| Adams | Westminster | 225.000 | 362.102 | 225 | 136th Avenue | |
| Adams | Westminster | 226.085 | 363.849 | 226 | 144th Avenue | |
| City and County of Broomfield | | 227.745 | 366.520 | 228 | E-470 south / Northwest Parkway west – Limon, Broomfield | Exit 47 on E-470/Northwest Parkway; access to Denver International Airport |
| City and County of Broomfield | | 229.107 | 368.712 | 229 | SH 7 – Lafayette, Brighton | |
| Weld | | 232.094 | 373.519 | 232 | CR 8 (Erie Parkway, Summit Boulevard) – Erie, Dacono | |
| Weld | Dacono | 235.114 | 378.379 | 235 | SH 52 – Dacono, Frederick, Fort Lupton | |
| Weld | | 240.114 | 386.426 | 240 | SH 119 west / Firestone Boulevard – Firestone, Longmont | |
| Weld | Mead | 243.148 | 391.309 | 243 | SH 66 – Longmont, Lyons | |
| Weld | Mead | 245.217 | 394.639 | 245 | CR 34 – Mead | |
| Weld | | 250.241 | 402.724 | 250 | SH 56 west – Berthoud | |
| Weld | Johnstown | 252.261 | 405.975 | 252 | SH 60 east – Johnstown, Milliken | |
| Larimer | | 254.216 | 409.121 | 254 | To SH 60 west – Campion | |
| Larimer | | 255.272 | 410.820 | 255 | SH 402 west – Loveland | |
| Larimer | Loveland | 257.305 | 414.092 | 257 | US 34 – Greeley, Loveland | |
| Larimer | Loveland | 259.309 | 417.317 | 259 | Crossroads Boulevard – Fort Collins-Loveland Airport | |
| Larimer | Windsor | 262.298 | 422.128 | 262 | SH 392 – Windsor, Fort Collins | |
| Larimer | Fort Collins | 265.314 | 426.981 | 265 | Harmony Road | |
| Larimer | Fort Collins | 268.475 | 432.069 | 268 | Prospect Road | |
| Larimer | Fort Collins | 269.370– 269.570 | 433.509– 433.831 | 269 | SH 14 – Fort Collins, Ault | Signed as exits 269A (east) and 269B (west) |
| Larimer | Fort Collins | 271.373 | 436.733 | 271 | CR 50 (Mountain Vista Drive) | |
| Larimer | Wellington | 277.884 | 447.211 | 278 | SH 1 south – Wellington | |
| Larimer | | 281.338 | 452.770 | 281 | CR 70 TO Owl Canyon Road | |
| Larimer | | 287.550 | 462.767 | 288 | CR 82 (Buckeye Road) | |
| Weld | | 292.583 | 470.867 | 293 | CR 126 – Carr | |
| Weld | | 298.870 | 480.985 | | I-25 north / US 87 north – Cheyenne, Casper | Continuation into Wyoming |
1.000 mi = 1.609 km; 1.000 km = 0.621 mi: Concurrency terminus; Electronic toll collection; HOV only; Incomplete access; Unopened

== Related routes ==
=== Auxiliary routes ===
Interstate 225
- Location: Aurora
- Length: 12 mi (19 km)

In Colorado, I-25 has only one auxiliary route. Interstate 225 (I-225) is a 12-mile-long (19 km) spur route located within the Denver Metro Area. It runs from its parent highway from the Denver Tech Center to I-70 north of Aurora. It is an eastern bypass for travelers on I-25 looking to avoid Downtown Denver traffic and also provides direct connection to Denver International Airport for the southern suburbs of Denver. It is the only auxiliary route for I-25 as there are no other routes in Wyoming and New Mexico.

=== Business routes ===
Interstate 25 Business
- Location: Aguilar, Walsenburg

Interstate 25 also has two active business routes within the state. In Aguilar, the town is connected to the freeway by Business Spur 25, which runs along Lynn Road and Walsenburg is served by Business Loop 25. There were three former routes that ran through Trinidad, Colorado Springs, and Castle Rock.

Interstate 25
| Previous state: New Mexico | Colorado | Next state: Wyoming |

U.S. Route 87
| Previous state: New Mexico | Colorado | Next state: Wyoming |
