= Colorado State Highway 88 =

State highway in Colorado, United States

State Highway 88
- SH 88 highlighted in red

Route information
- Maintained by CDOT
- Length: 19.171 mi (30.853 km)

Major junctions
- North end: I-70 BL / US 40 / US 287 in Denver
- US 6 in Denver; US 285 in Sheridan; US 85 in Englewood; I-25 / US 87 in Greenwood Village
- East end: SH 83 in Aurora

Location
- Country: United States
- State: Colorado
- Counties: Denver, Arapahoe

Highway system
- Colorado State Highway System; Interstate; US; State; Scenic
← US 87	→ SH 89

State Highway 88 (SH 88) is a state highway located within the Denver Metropolitan Area in the U.S. state of Colorado. Spanning 19.171 miles (30.853 km), the highway travels through the City and County of Denver and Arapahoe County. SH 88 begins at Colfax Avenue (I-70 Bus., US 40, and US 287) in Denver and heads south along Federal Boulevard until it reaches Belleview Avenue, where it continues east until it reaches Interstate 25 in the Denver Tech Center. It then continues along Arapahoe Road until it reaches eastern terminus at SH 83 (Parker Road) in Aurora.

SH 88 is one of the original state highways commissioned when the state highway system was formed in 1923. It originally was a continuous route that went from Belleview to Broadway and then east to Parker Road. It was extended along Quincy Avenue to serve the Lowry Field Bombing Range and was turned back after the bombing range was decommissioned. It was then rerouted on the newly built Arapahoe Road that goes from I-25 to Parker Road, making the present day route from Colfax Avenue in Denver to Parker Road in Aurora.

== Route description ==
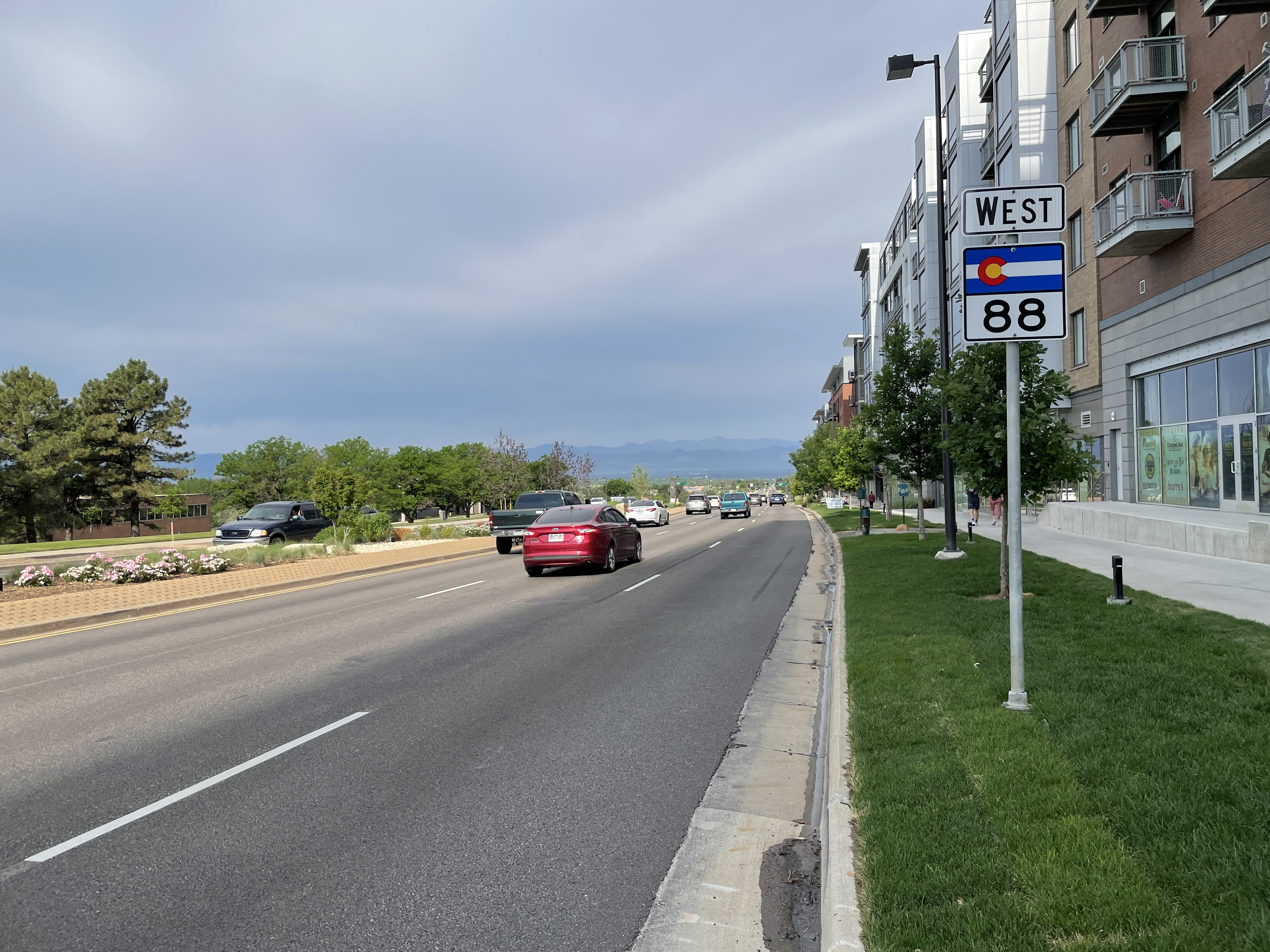
SH 88 westbound in Greenwood Village

SH 88 is a 19.171-mile (30.853 km) long highway, starting at a cloverleaf intersection at Colfax Avenue (U.S. Route 40) and Federal Boulevard in Denver. It starts as a six lane highway going south with a 35 mph speed limit. It then interchanges with the 6th Avenue Freeway (US 6) before passing through the west Denver neighborhoods. Continuing south, it interchanges at US 285's final exit as a freeway entering Sheridan. It then turns east on Belleview with three lanes in each direction and a 40 mph speed limit. It passes under US 85 and goes through another neighborhood with two lanes in each direction approaching Greenwood Village. The route enters the Denver Tech Center and becomes concurrent with Interstate 25 from exit 199 to exit 197 at Arapahoe Road. SH-88 continues east with a 40 mph speed limit on Arapahoe Road with three lanes in each direction passing through Centennial and north of Centennial Airport with a 55 mph speed limit until it reaches its eastern terminus at Parker Road (State Highway 83) in Foxfield.

== History ==
SH 88 is an original 1920's highway that originally ran along Belleview from Broadway to Parker Road in Greenwood Village. In 1939, it was extended east along Quincy Avenue into the now defunct Lowry Field Bombing Range until 1954, when the bombing range was decommissioned. The western extension to Santa Fe (US 85) was completed by 1956. In 1959, the section along Arapahoe road was added, originally as a gravel road and it wasn't paved until 1961. The section of Federal Blvd in Sheridan was originally signed as SH 75 and was renumbered to SH 88 in 1968. Arapahoe Road didn't become an expressway until it was built east to Peoria Street in 1977 and the final stretch to SH 83 (Parker Rd.) wasn't finished until 1990. The intersection of Arapahoe Road and Parker Road used to have a triple left going from eastbound to northbound and was one of the most congested intersections in the Denver Metro Area. It was later upgraded to an interchange where Parker Road now continues north without stopping. The interchange was completed in 2012.

The road is dangerous, as certain intersections have seen multiple casualties in crashes.

== Major intersections ==
County	Location	mi (Note: Although the total length is 19.171 miles, CDOT doesn't include the concurrent section with I-25 as part of SH 88, thus leaving out approximately two miles)	km	Exit	Destinations	Notes
City and County of Denver		0.000	0.000		I-70 BL / US 40 / US 287 (Colfax Avenue)	Interchange; Northern terminus, road continues north as U.S. 287
City and County of Denver		1.090	1.754		US 6 (Sixth Avenue)	Interchange; access to US 6 east via Fifth Avenue
City and County of Denver		1.978	3.183		SH 26 (Alameda Avenue)	
Arapahoe	Sheridan	5.973	9.613		US 285	Interchange; signage changes from north/south to east/west
Arapahoe	Littleton	8.711	14.019		US 85 (Santa Fe Drive)	Single-point urban interchange
Arapahoe	Cherry Hills Village–Greenwood Village line	11.560	18.604		SH 177 (University Boulevard)	SH88 briefly becomes an expressway when it interchanges with SH177 with controlled access merge ramps for right turning traffic.
Arapahoe	Greenwood Village	14.770	23.770	199	I-25 north / US 87 north / Belleview Avenue east – Denver	Western terminus of concurrency with I-25/ US-87; Eastern terminus of concurrency with Belleview Avenue; I-25 exit 199
Arapahoe	Greenwood Village			198	Orchard Road	I-25 exit 198
Arapahoe	Greenwood Village	16.827	27.080	197	I-25 south / US 87 south / Arapahoe Road west – Colorado Springs	Eastern terminus of concurrency with I-25/US-87; Western end of concurrency with Arapahoe road; I-25 exit 197
Arapahoe	Aurora	21.734	34.977		SH 83 (Parker Road)	Interchange; eastern terminus
1.000 mi = 1.609 km; 1.000 km = 0.621 mi: Concurrency terminus; Proposed; Incomplete access; Route transition
