= Colorado State Highway 56 =

Highway in Larimer and Weld counties, Colorado

State Highway 56
- SH 56 highlighted in red

Route information
- Maintained by CDOT
- Length: 9.529 mi (15.335 km)

Major junctions
- West end: US 287 in Berthoud
- East end: I-25 / US 87 in Johnstown

Location
- Country: United States
- State: Colorado
- Counties: Larimer, Weld

Highway system
- Colorado State Highway System; Interstate; US; State; Scenic
← SH 55	→ SH 57

State Highway 56 (SH 56) is a Colorado highway that connects Berthoud with Johnstown. SH 56's western terminus is at U.S. Route 287 (US 287) in Berthoud, and the eastern terminus is at Interstate 25 (I-25) and US 87 in Johnstown.

== Route description ==
SH 56 runs 9.5 miles (15.3 km), starting at Meadowlark Drive in Berthoud and heading east to a junction with I-25 in Johnstown.

== Major intersections ==
County	Location	mi	km	Destinations	Notes
Larimer	Berthoud	0.000	0.000	US 287	Western terminus
Weld	Johnstown	9.546	15.363	I-25 / US 87 – Fort Collins, Denver	Eastern terminus; I-25 exit 250
1.000 mi = 1.609 km; 1.000 km = 0.621 mi

== See also ==
- List of state highways in Colorado
