= Colorado State Highway 95 =

State highway in Colorado, United States

State Highway 95
- Sheridan Boulevard
- SH 95 highlighted in red

Route information
- Maintained by CDOT
- Length: 14.33 mi (23.06 km)

Major junctions
- South end: US 285 in Denver
- US 6 in Lakewood; I-70 in Arvada; I-76 in Arvada
- North end: US 36 in Westminster

Location
- Country: United States
- State: Colorado
- Counties: Denver, Jefferson, Adams

Highway system
- Colorado State Highway System; Interstate; US; State; Scenic
| ← SH 94 | → SH 96 |

State Highway 95 (SH 95) is a 14.33 mile (23.06 km) long north–south state highway in the U.S. state of Colorado. SH 95's southern terminus is at U.S. Route 285 (US 285) in Denver and the northern terminus is at US 36 in Westminster.

== Route description ==
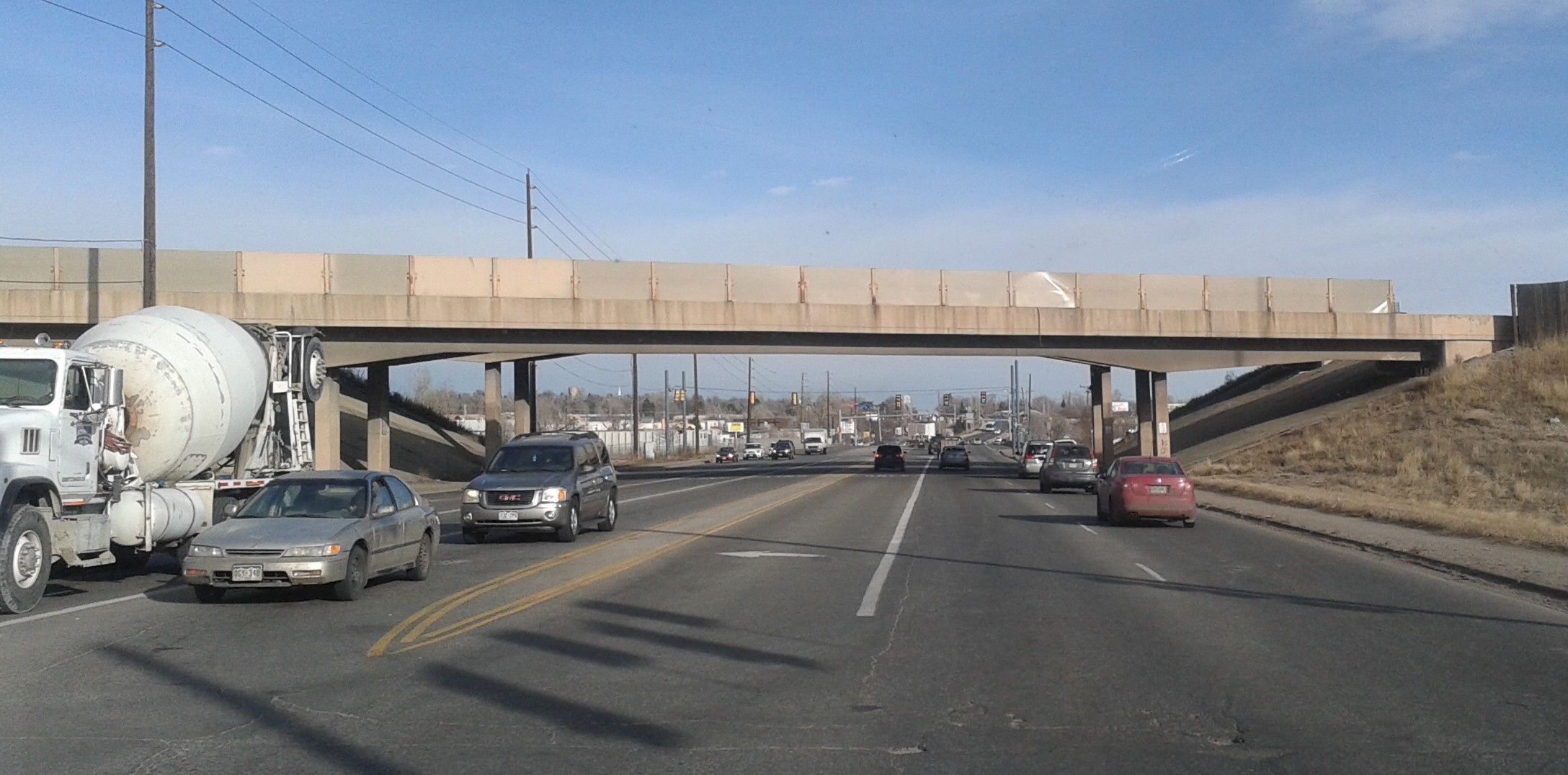
I-76 bridge over SH 95 in Adams County

SH 95 overlaps with Sheridan Boulevard for the entirety of its length. It starts at US 285 in Denver and ends at US 36 in Westminster. There are interchanges with US 6, I-70, and I-76. In the area between I-70 and Colfax Avenue, the road lies just west of Sloan's Lake. State Highway 95 is generally considered to be the dividing line between Jefferson County on the west and Denver and Adams counties on the east.

== Major intersections ==
| County | Location | mi | km | Destinations | Notes |
|---|---|---|---|---|---|
| City and County of Denver | | 0.000 | 0.000 | US 285 (Hampden Avenue) / Sheridan Boulevard south | Interchange; southern terminus |
| Jefferson | | 3.975 | 6.397 | SH 26 east (Alameda Avenue) | Western terminus of SH 26 |
| Jefferson | | 5.018 | 8.076 | US 6 (Sixth Avenue) | Interchange |
| Jefferson | Lakewood | 6.031 | 9.706 | I-70 BL / US 40 (Colfax Avenue) | |
| Jefferson | Lakeside | 9.013 | 14.505 | I-70 | Exit 271A on I-70 |
| Jefferson | | 9.889 | 15.915 | I-76 | Exit 1B on I-76 |
| Adams | Westminster | 14.376 | 23.136 | US 36 / Sheridan Boulevard north | Interchange; northern terminus |
1.000 mi = 1.609 km; 1.000 km = 0.621 mi
