= Carr, Colorado =

Unincorporated community in Weld County, Colorado, USA

- unincorporated community
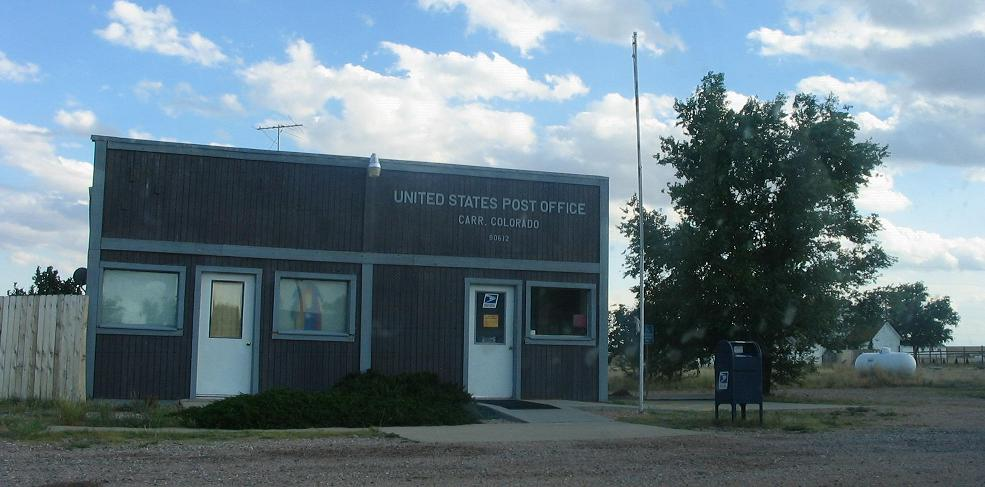
- Post office in Carr

- Location of Carr, Colorado. Carr (Colorado)
- Coordinates: 40°53′46″N 104°52′30″W
- Country: United States
- State: Colorado
- County: Weld
- Established: 1872

Government
  - Type: unincorporated community
  - Body: Weld County
- Elevation: 5,712 ft (1,741 m)
- Time zone: UTC−07:00 (MST)
  - Summer (DST): UTC−06:00 (MDT)
- ZIP code: 80612
- Area codes: 970/748
- GNIS town ID: 169533

Carr is an unincorporated community that used to have a U.S. Post Office in Weld County, Colorado, United States. The ZIP Code of Carr is 80612. Some consider Carr a ghost town. Today, a few old houses remain plus a church and the schoolhouse, but the old store fronts are gone. There are some scattered old foundations throughout the town. There are a growing number of year-round residents, so the town no longer appears abandoned.

== History ==
The town of Carr was established by the Union Pacific Railroad in 1872. Carr was named for Robert E. Carr of the Union Pacific, who managed the construction of the rail line through the town. The Carr, Colorado, post office opened on March 26, 1872.

From 1920 until 1939, the town carried Old Colorado State Highway 5, which was meant as an access route. However, during this time, routes numbered 1–19 were major cross state highways, making it a somewhat useless route.

The U. S. Post Office was closed circa 2021 when the privately owned building, that was being leased by the USPS, became uninhabitable.

One of the local landmarks was a Geodesic Dome greenhouse just south of the post office on County Road 21 (a.k.a. 2nd Street.). The structure was torn down circa 2022 after the new Post Office building owners took possession.

Circa 2022, County Road 21 (a.k.a. 2nd Street) was paved from County Road 126 (a.k.a. Stevenson Avenue) to County Road 124. It is the first paved north–south road.

== Geography ==
Just north of the Carr turnoff on I-25 is the Carr Natural Fort. It is a natural limestone formation where many noted Indian battles took place between the Crow and Blackfeet tribes.

The town sits in the bottom of the Lone Tree Creek valley. When just passing through, the size of the valley may seem relatively insignificant, but it is large enough for a temperature inversion to hold cold air in place in the wintertime.

== See also ==
- Greeley, CO Metropolitan Statistical Area
- Front Range Urban Corridor
- List of populated places in Colorado
- List of post offices in Colorado
