= Berkley, Colorado =

Census-designated place in Adams County, Colorado, United States

- census-designated place
- Location of the Berkley CDP in Adams County, Colorado.
- Coordinates: 39°48′16″N 105°01′41″W
- Country: United States
- State: Colorado
- County: Adams

Government
  - Type: unincorporated community
  - Body: Adams County

Area
  - Total: 4.089 sq mi (10.590 km^{2})
  - Land: 3.600 sq mi (9.323 km^{2})
  - Water: 0.489 sq mi (1.267 km^{2})
- Elevation: 5,210 ft (1,590 m)

Population (2020)
  - Total: 12,536
  - Density: 3,483/sq mi (1,345/km^{2})
- Time zone: UTC−07:00 (MST)
  - Summer (DST): UTC−06:00 (MDT)
- ZIP Code: Denver 80221
- Area codes: 303/720/983
- GNIS CDP ID: 2407830
- FIPS code: 08-06172

Berkley is an unincorporated community and a census-designated place (CDP) located in southwestern Adams County, Colorado, United States. The CDP is a part of the Denver–Aurora–Lakewood, CO Metropolitan Statistical Area. The population of the Berkley CDP was 12,536 at the United States Census 2020. Berkley never had a post office, but Denver post office 80221 serves the area.

== Geography ==
At the 2020 United States census, the Berkley CDP had an area of 2,617 acres (10.590 km^{2}), including 313 acres (1.267 km^{2}) of water. The Berkley CDP lies immediately north of the Berkeley neighborhood of Denver, Colorado.

== Demographics ==
The United States Census Bureau initially defined the Berkley CDP for the United States Census 2000.

Berkley CDP, Colorado
Year	Pop.	±%
2000	10,743	—
2010	11,207	+4.3%
2020	12,536	+11.9%
Source: United States Census Bureau

=== 2020 census ===
As of the 2020 census, Berkley had a population of 12,536. The median age was 33.5 years. 24.7% of residents were under the age of 18 and 10.4% of residents were 65 years of age or older. For every 100 females there were 109.3 males, and for every 100 females age 18 and over there were 109.0 males age 18 and over.

100.0% of residents lived in urban areas, while 0.0% lived in rural areas.

There were 4,310 households in Berkley, of which 35.3% had children under the age of 18 living in them. Of all households, 38.7% were married-couple households, 25.8% were households with a male householder and no spouse or partner present, and 25.7% were households with a female householder and no spouse or partner present. About 22.4% of all households were made up of individuals and 8.1% had someone living alone who was 65 years of age or older.

There were 4,550 housing units, of which 5.3% were vacant. The homeowner vacancy rate was 1.1% and the rental vacancy rate was 5.2%.

Racial composition as of the 2020 census
Race	Number	Percent
White	5,681	45.3%
Black or African American	189	1.5%
American Indian and Alaska Native	339	2.7%
Asian	439	3.5%
Native Hawaiian and Other Pacific Islander	24	0.2%
Some other race	3,413	27.2%
Two or more races	2,451	19.6%
Hispanic or Latino (of any race)	7,292	58.2%

== See also ==
- List of census-designated places in Colorado
- List of populated places in Colorado
