= Colfax Avenue =

Street in Denver, Colorado, United States

- Namesake: Schuyler Colfax
- Length: 49.5 mi (79.7 km)
- Component highways: I-70 BL / US 40 from Golden to Aurora; I-70 BS through Watkins and Strasburg; US 287 from Denver to Aurora; SH 36 from near Aurora to Strasburg
- West end: I-70 BL / US 40 / CR 93 in Golden
- Major junctions: US 6 at the Golden–West Pleasant View line; I-70 in West Pleasant View; US 287 / SH 88 in Denver; I-25 in Denver; SH 2 in Denver; I-225 in Aurora; I-70 BL / US 40 / US 287 / CR 2 in Aurora; E-470 in Aurora; I-70 / SH 36 / CR 2 near Aurora; I-70 / I-70 BS / CR 2 near Strasburg
- East end: SH 36 / Headlight Road in Strasburg

Colfax Avenue is the main street that runs east–west through the Denver metropolitan area in Colorado. As U.S. Highway 40, it was one of two principal highways serving Denver before the Interstate Highway System was constructed. In the local street system, Colfax lies 15 blocks north of the zero meridian street of Ellsworth Avenue, and would thus it otherwise be known as 15th Avenue (Avenues north of Ellsworth are generally numbered numerically.) The street was named for former Vice President Schuyler Colfax. At just under 50 miles (80 kilometers) in length, it is known as the "longest continuous commercial street in the United States".

== Geography ==
From west to east, Colfax Avenue starts at Heritage Road in Golden as U.S. Highway 40 and the I-70 Business Loop, and continues east through Lakewood and enters Denver at Sheridan Boulevard. U.S. Highway 287 joins Colfax just west of I-25, and follows Colfax east through Denver and Aurora. In downtown Denver, near the Colorado State Capitol, the designation changes from West Colfax Avenue to East Colfax Avenue at the intersection with Broadway. It continues as East Colfax Avenue for the remainder of the route. In eastern Aurora, Colfax Avenue and Picadilly Road meet, with the I-70 business loop and the two U.S. highways following the I-70 route eastward via a new I-70 Picadilly Road (DDI) interchange, which replaced the old I-70 Colfax intersection. Colfax continues eastward from Picadilly Road via Colfax I-70 frontage road to E-470. East Colfax Avenue with Colfax signage continues east passing through the complex E-470 I-70 interchange, appearing as a frontage road of I-70 on most maps. About one block east of E-470 a north turn continues Colfax eastward separating Colfax from East 14th Avenue. At an interchange (I-70 Exit 292), Colfax Avenue travels concurrently as State Highway 36 and continues east from Aurora through Bennett to end at Headlight Road in Strasburg.

In the area between E-470 and Colfax joining State Highway 36 a new Aerotropolis Parkway interchange, under construction in December 2025, added about one half mile to the length of Colfax Avenue as it routes around the new interchange area.

Colfax Avenue cuts through Original Auraria, the city's historic core, and skirts the southern edge of downtown Denver. Because of the dense, mixed-use character of the development along Colfax Avenue, the Regional Transportation District bus route 15 - East Colfax has the highest ridership in the RTD system. In 2006, the first Colorado Colfax Marathon was held, traversing the length of Colfax Avenue through the three cities.

It's become legend that, at some time in the 1970s, Playboy magazine called Colfax "the longest, wickedest street in America", due to the prevalence of drugs, sex work, violence and poverty, but attempts to source the actual quote have failed. Periodically, Colfax undergoes redevelopment by the municipalities along its course that bring in new housing, businesses and restaurants.

== History ==
=== East Colfax ===
==== 1860–1890: Elite residential street ====
Colfax's precursor, Grand Avenue, was established in along what was the southern boundary of central Denver. It was established as an east–west running baseline street along with the north–south running Broadway, to border new eastern and southern districts for the city. In 1868, Grand was renamed "Colfax" to honor U.S. House Speaker Schuyler Colfax who later became Ulysses Grant's Vice President. Colfax had visited Denver in 1865, and locals may have named the street after him to gain national support from the prominent Indiana congressman for Colorado's ongoing statehood initiative.

Denver's population rapidly increased with the arrival of railroads, growing from 4,759 in 1870 to 106,713 in 1890. The area along Colfax developed unevenly: by the end of 1879, the area east of Broadway and north of Colfax was still mostly open prairie, but the area between Grant and Ogden Streets had become a prominent residential area. By 1887, residents and property owners along Colfax began pushing for better transportation options.

A cable railway was built in 1886 to connect Grant and Colfax with downtown Denver. The system was eventually replaced with streetcars, which facilitated more efficient transportation and encouraged development away from the city center. The construction of the State Capitol building in 1886 also had a positive impact on the development of the corridor, and by 1890, the Colfax Avenue Railway Company had extended its line to Montclair.

==== 1890–1910: Conversion to denser housing ====
The Panic of 1893 led to an economic depression in Denver, and many large houses along Colfax were converted into multi-family units. The once lavish and expensive homes along East Colfax and in Capitol Hill were no longer easy to maintain, and owners of the single-family mansions were forced to rent out rooms in their homes to temporary workers. As the economy recovered, apartment buildings were constructed, raising concerns among residents about the impact on property values and neighborhood quality. Three buildings still in existence from this early period are The Colonnade, Alta Court (formerly the Altamaha Apartment Building), and the Hamilton. The cultural and demographic shift, from single-family mansions toward boarding houses and rental property for the transient middle class, marked a shift in the demographics of East Colfax.

===== 1910–1940: Automobiles and commerce =====
The development of East Colfax was significantly influenced by the automobile, with the number of cars increasing exponentially from the mid-1910s to the 1920s. Increasing traffic led to the corridor becoming more commercial and the street was paved sometime prior to 1920. It part of the transcontinental U.S. Route 40 in the mid-1920s. Various groups sought to make East Colfax the best road in the state, transforming it into the gateway to Denver for tourists visiting by automobile from the East. It remained the gateway to Denver until i-70 was built in the 1950s.

Denver's 1925 zoning code designated most of East Colfax as commercial or business, and the city's 1929 Master Plan acknowledged its transformation from a residential street to a business artery. This change led to a boom in commercial building construction in the 1920s, with various structures being erected along the avenue. While construction declined during the Great Depression and World War II, some commercial buildings and apartments continued to be built.

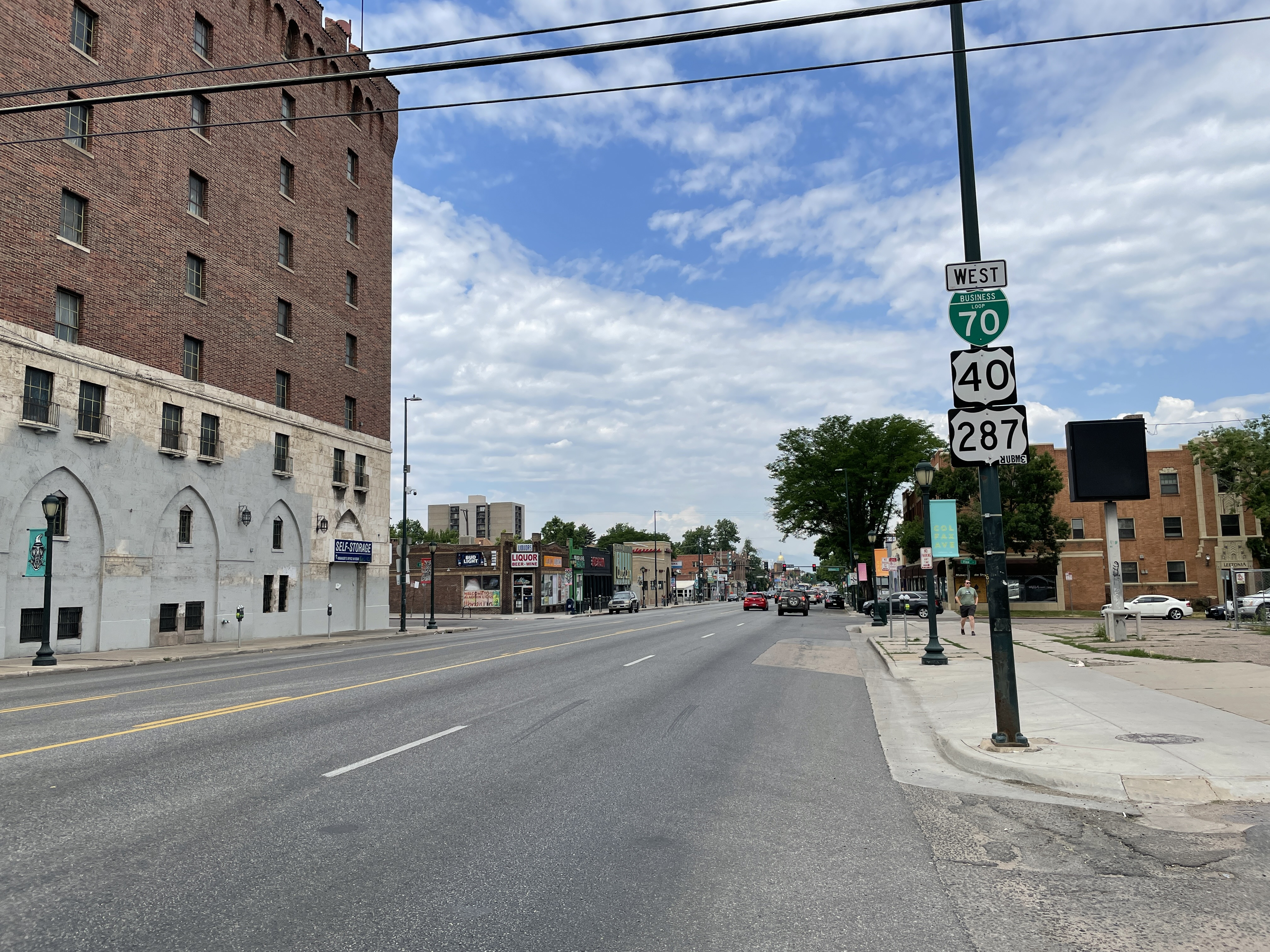
Colfax Avenue westbound east of downtown Denver

==== 1940s–present ====
East Colfax and Capitol Hill remained a solid middle-class neighborhood until the next demographic change occurred. After World War II, the mentality of many urban dwellers shifted. Mortgage lenders preferred new construction and there was a massive "white flight" to the suburbs. Families and the established middle class left Capitol Hill in a mass diaspora, selling off the family home to a developer interested in putting up a high-rise in its place or leaving the home abandoned. The demographics of people left behind were an underclass of transients and renters.

Also, the zoning along East Colfax has been badly planned for 50 years. In the 1950s East Colfax was rezoned B4, and the planners encouraged separation of uses and dependence on the automobile. Property owners along East Colfax found it much more rewarding to tear down an existing historic building and put up a new building in its place, rather than renovating. Planners and building officials encouraged this, for this was a time when old was considered ugly and new buildings meant progress.

In addition the zoning code from the 1950s, a 2:1 floor-area ratio (FAR) was adopted for East Colfax. These ratios determine the square footage of the building in relation to the lot size. Builders in the 1950s who tore down historic buildings along East Colfax for the purpose of developing a brand-new property were required to abide by the car-friendly codes and provide for automobile use.

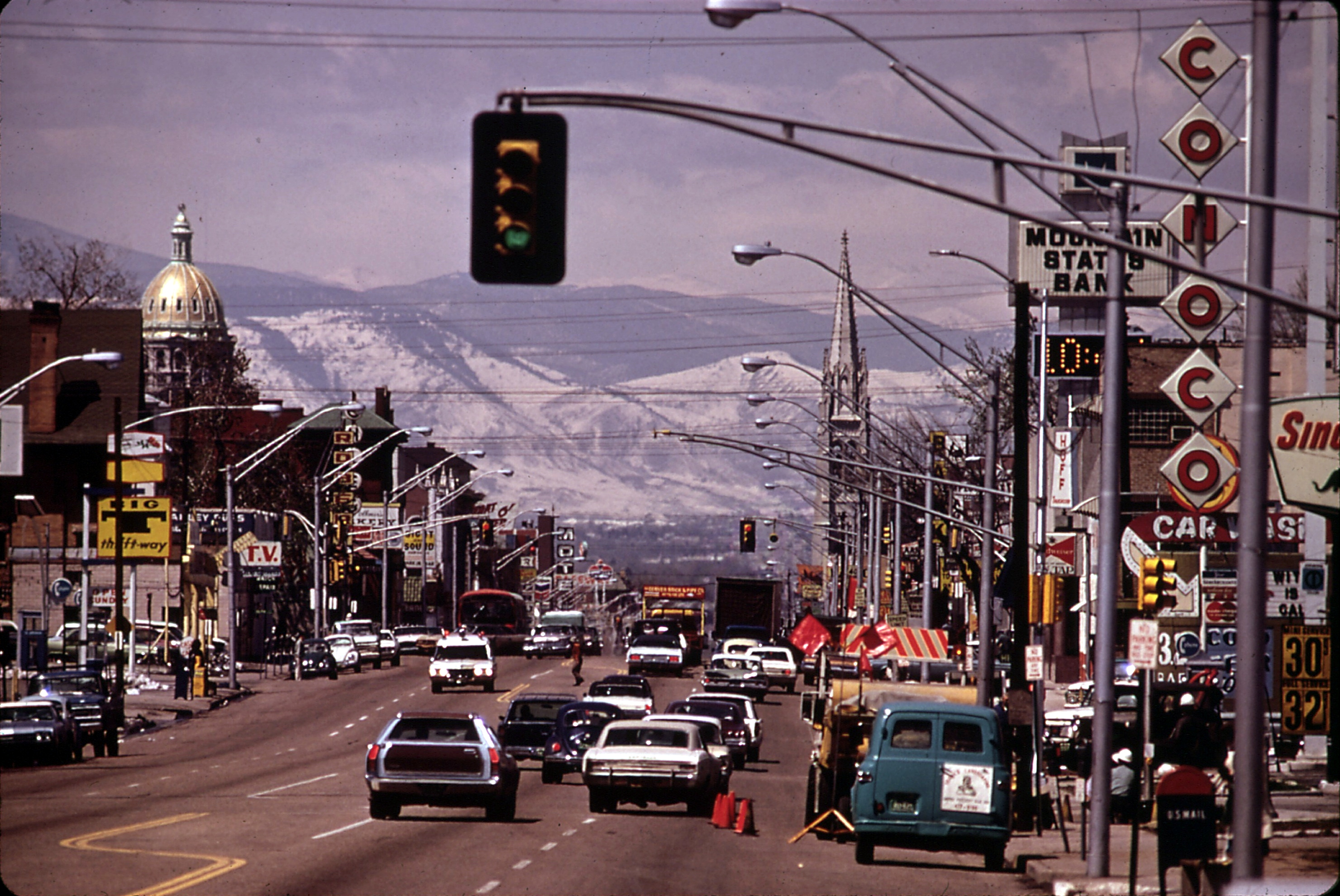
Looking down East Colfax in 1972 with the capitol and the Basilica of the Immaculate Conception seen in the background

As the feasibility study, East Colfax Avenue: An Opportunity and a Model for Development Action, claims about the streetscape of East Colfax, "[East Colfax is designed to] encourage development of smaller parcels that lack frontage definition, have unevenly deep setback patterns and leave a large quantity of undeveloped space." This FAR almost single-handedly contributed to the architectural demise of East Colfax.

Phil Goodstein, a Denver historian, analyzes the effect of the FAR in his book, The Ghosts of Denver: Capitol Hill. "Now the businesses were set back from the sidewalk with a parking lot between the store and the street. Every block, it seemed, became a parking lot while customers found it necessary to drive from one store to the next. Pedestrians had to dodge cars in the middle of the block... In light of this unpleasant walking atmosphere and Denver's increasing addiction to the automobile, the number of people on the street declined. With this, the neighborhood became less safe." It was a steady downward spiral with many factors leading to what East Colfax is today, including the lack of interest in historic buildings and the myopic visions of the 1950s planners.

Another monumental watershed moment in the history of East Colfax Avenue was the completion of Interstate 70. No longer did incoming tourists drive down the thoroughfare on their way into downtown. The tourist dollar was effectively wiped out as a revenue source for East Colfax after this decade. So began another downward spiral. With no tourists to spend money along East Colfax the businesses suffered, as did the demand to go to Capitol Hill.

=== West Colfax ===
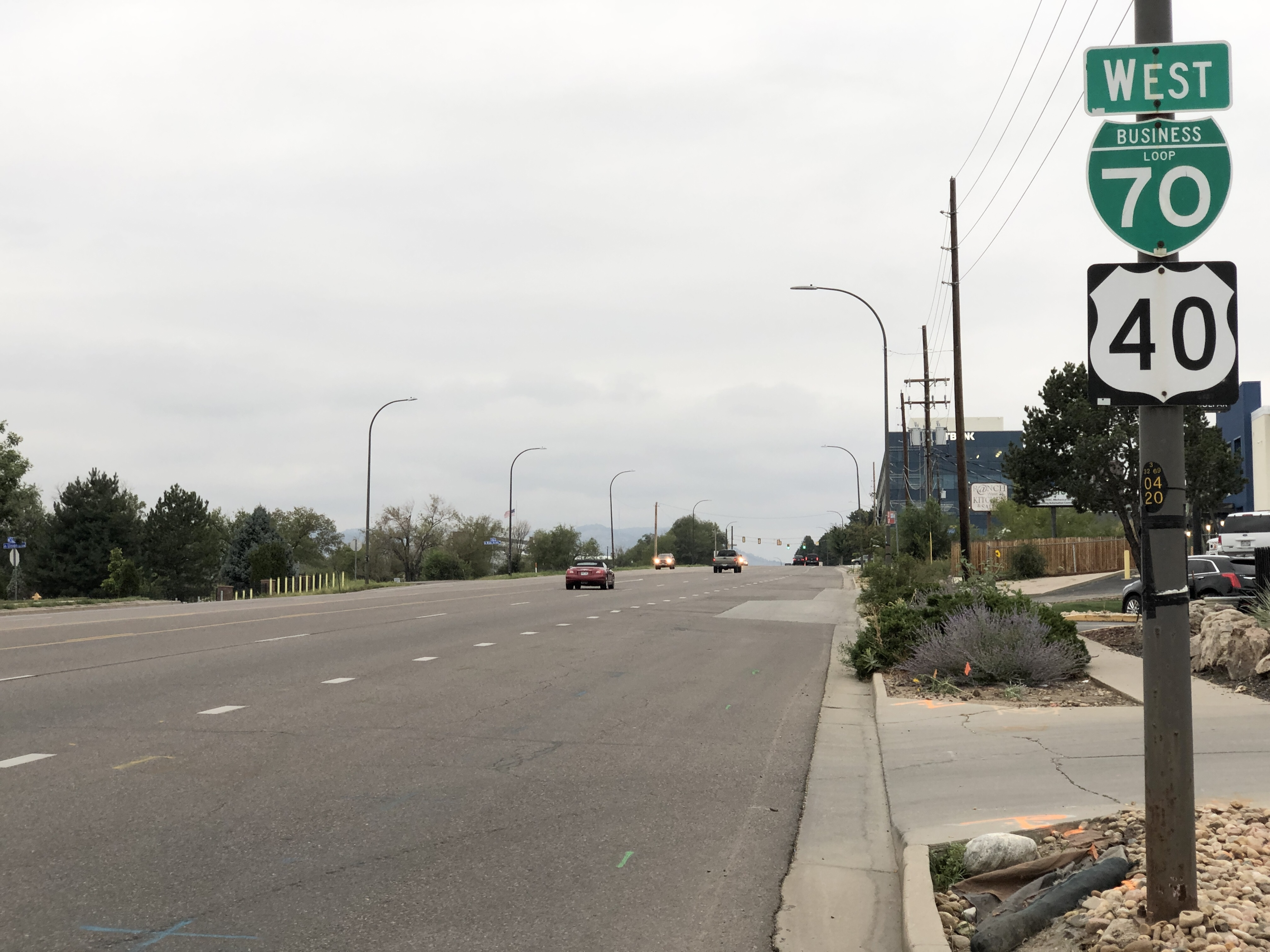
West Colfax Avenue in Lakewood

West Colfax Avenue began as a trail blazed during the Colorado Gold Rush, being a well-traveled direct route to the gold fields in the mountains. Historic media and other sources confirm its existence at least as far back as the spring of 1859, and it immediately became a major thoroughfare of goods, people and transportation service to and from the Colorado mountains. Soon it took on its original name, South Golden Road, as the southern road from Denver to Golden.

Originally West Colfax was configured with two major differences than how it exists today. It did not proceed past today's intersection with Wide Acres Road, as originally Wide Acres and today's South Golden (or Old Golden) roads were the continuation of the thoroughfare into Golden. Also, the road's original route took it through the bed of present-day Sloan's Lake, then a convenient swale for road travel. Stagecoach driver Bill Turner, who drove the route for the Central Overland California and Pike's Peak Express, told the Colorado Transcript in 1909 how and when this changed:

The reason I'm telling you about this is to explain what I know about Sloan's lake. The stage line was from Denver to Golden and Central City. The road was the southern route to Golden and we crossed the Platte river where Larimer street crosses it now, and the road went on out over the hill and into that wide sag, or swale, where Sloan's lake is now. The road was good right down through the middle of what would now be the bed of the lake. In June, 1861, when I went down into Kansas territory to keep a stage station, there wasn't any lake there. When I came back in the early part of 1863, less than two years later, there was the lake just as it is now, and it never has changed a bit that ever I could see. There was some talk years afterward about a man having dug a well there and it overflowed, forming the lake, but I was along there about as much as anybody and I never saw any well. However, it may have started from a well. All I know is that it came there in a good deal less than two year, to my certain knowledge. When I came back from the lower country, the road I used to travel was changed. The lake had covered up the old right of way.

The road for many years traveled over open prairie with various farms along the way. With the arrival of a tramway line running along West 13th Avenue, landowner William A. H. Loveland and others laid out the new city of Lakewood between Golden and Denver. The road, which soon became known as Colfax, became Lakewood's main thoroughfare. Schuyler Colfax himself had actually once traveled this portion of the road named after him, when he was traveling by stagecoach with presidential candidate Ulysses S. Grant during a campaign getaway in 1868. In the meantime of the late 19th Century, the eastern end of West Colfax became home to numerous Jewish people of the Denver area. In 1898, Dr. Charles David Spivak, a noted Russian immigrant, physician and genealogist, established the Jewish Consumptives Relief Society to treat tuberculosis victims on a 105-acre (0.42 km^{2}) campus in today's 6400 block of the road. This sanitorium treated victims of the White Plague who were too poor to pay or whose cases were too desperate to cure. The Golden Hill Cemetery was established at the western end of the road, divided into mainstream and the hill sections, the hill being the final resting place of victims who could not be cured. The hill section, as well as the JCRS campus, are now listed on the National Register of Historic Places.

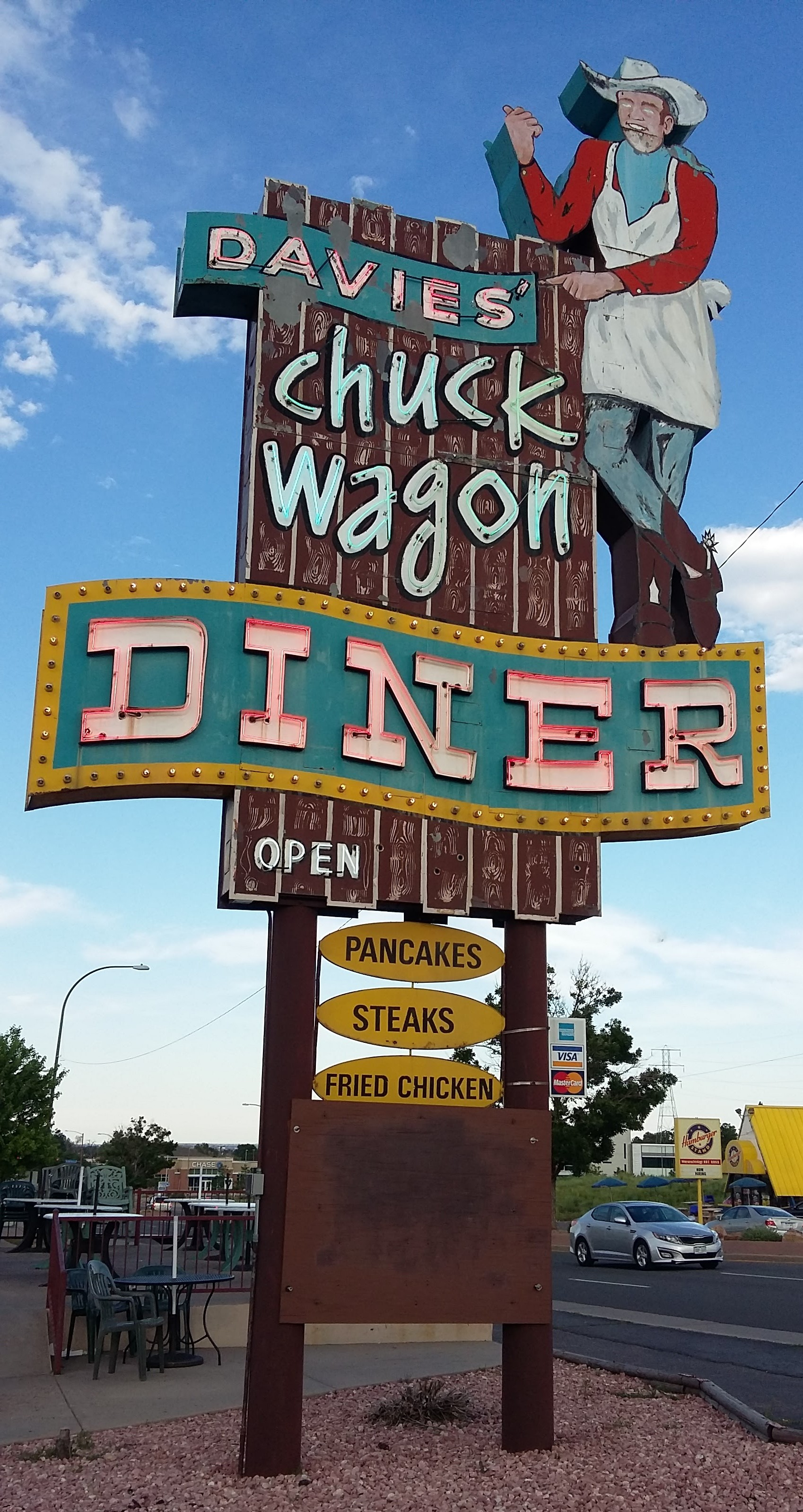
Neon sign of Davies' Chuck Wagon Diner

Around 1914 West Colfax was paved with concrete and designated a state highway, and it continued evolving into a major commercial thoroughfare of the region. During Prohibition it began showing signs of more colorful notoriety when scofflaw roadhouses such as Twilight Gardens operated along the thoroughfare. In 1937 the Works Progress Administration completely paved and modernized the highway, and built a new western route which took it over the hill and across ranch land to the entrance of Mt. Vernon Canyon, its present route. Around this time Colfax was designated U.S. Highway 40. From there on, commercial development boomed, including numerous motels, automobile dealerships, restaurants and more. After World War II it was a classic neon-lined highway for natives and travelers of its era; among its landmarks was Davies Chuck Wagon Diner, brought there in 1957 by restaurateur rancher Lyman Davies. The diner is also listed on the National Register of Historic Places. In 1956, two shopping malls, Westland and the JCRS Center, were built along Colfax, introducing major department stores and groceries to the area. At its far west end, at the base of the mountains, the Magic Mountain theme park was built, among the first of its kind in the world. The theme park, like many of its era, collapsed, but was resurrected in the 1970s as Heritage Square.

After the construction of nearby West 6th Avenue (U.S. Highway 6) and Interstate 70, West Colfax Avenue through Denver's West Colfax Neighborhood, Northeast Lakewood, and Edgewater slowly declined and gained the seedy crime reputation and reality of its eastern counterpart. Since the 1970s, West Colfax Avenue through west Denver, Northeast Lakewood, Edgewater has had a high reputation and population of Mexican Americans as well as other Latino immigrants. During the 1990s, Lakewood began what has become a series of urban renewal and beautification efforts along the thoroughfare, from streetscaping to encouraging new proliferation of neon lighting to capitalize on its colorful past. Westland was rebuilt, and the JCRS Center also modified, but not so far as to eliminate the highly popular Casa Bonita restaurant which joined it in 1974. On the west end, the Stevinson family, who had originally built automobile dealerships there in the 1960s, built the new Denver West Village shopping center in 1997. In 2002 the Colorado Mills shopping center was built and opened across Colfax from there, the largest commercial development yet built on Colfax.

In the late 1990s the entirety of Colfax Avenue was designated a Colorado Heritage Corridor by the state government.

== Notable establishments ==
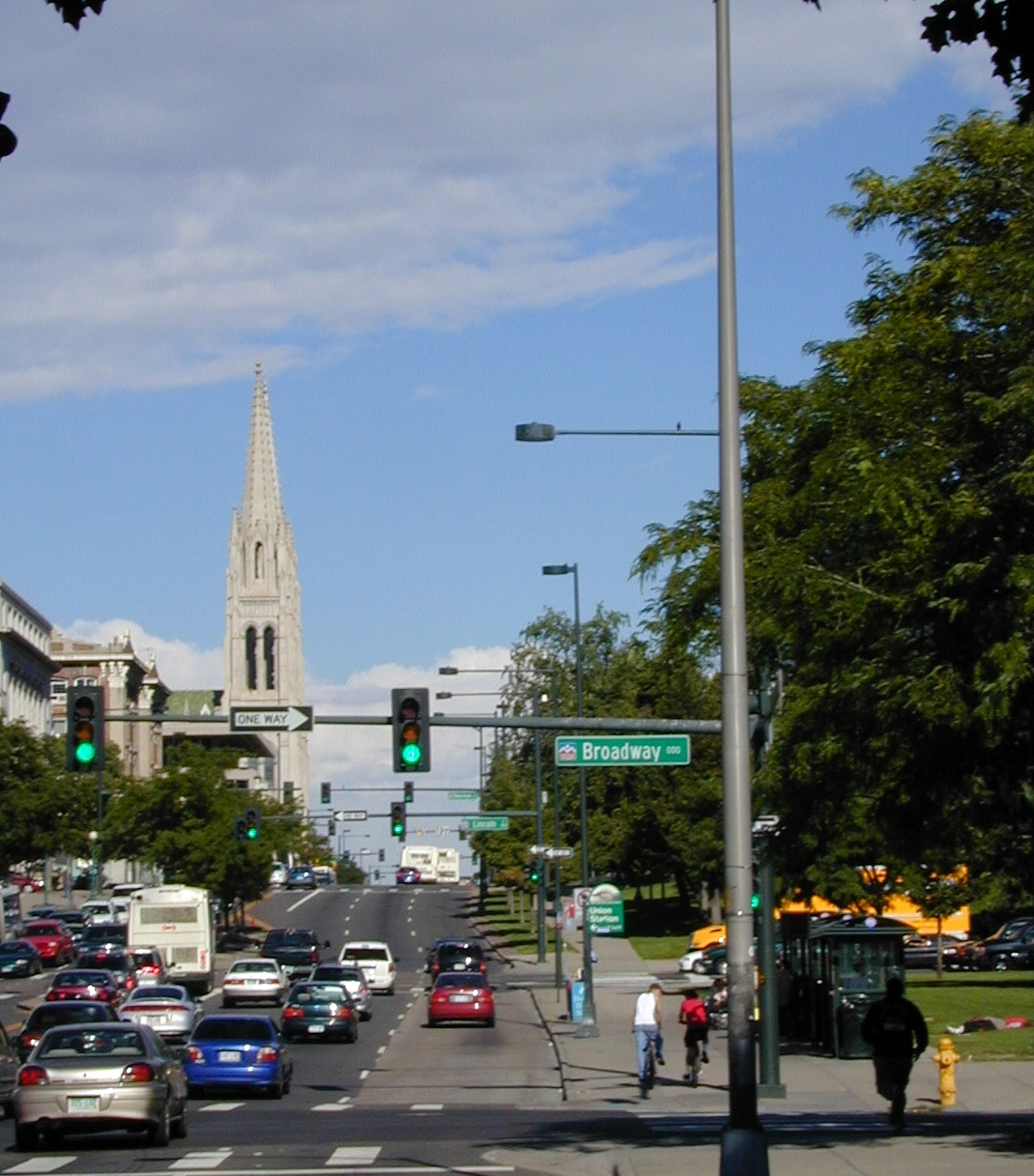
Colfax and Broadway, looking east, with the Basilica of the Immaculate Conception visible on the left

=== Theatres ===
Colfax is a hub for live music and culture in Denver. A number of theaters actively operate on the street.

==== Ogden Theatre ====
The Ogden Theatre is a concert venue that has been a significant part of the city's entertainment history since its founding as a silent-film theatre in 1917 by John Thompson and Henry Goodridge. It is one of the oldest still-operational theaters in Denver, and was designated a National Historical Place after its reopening in 1993 by current owner Doug Kauffman. The venue has hosted notable figures such as Sir Arthur Conan Doyle and Prince, and has also played a role in the success of local bands like The Lumineers. Designed by architect Harry W. J. Edbrooke in a Mediterranean style, the theater has not only been a concert venue but also a silent film and vaudeville theater, and later a motion picture theater.

==== Bluebird Theatre ====
Built in 1913 as the Thompson Theatre, the Bluebird Theatre was given its current name by theatre mogul Harry Huffman in 1921. Huffman hosted a successful War Bonds contest during WWII, but the theater faced challenges in the post-war years, eventually screening low-budget and adult films until its closure in 1987. In 1994, Chris Swank and Evan Dechtman purchased the Bluebird and renovated it into a live music venue with tiered levels and a bar, aided by federal funding. AEG assumed control of the property in 2006. The Bluebird Theater is known for an intimate atmosphere and contributing to the cultural heritage of Colfax Avenue. Designed by architect Harry W. J. Edbrooke, the two-story building features a light tan brick exterior with red terra cotta accents and a lighted marquee.

=== Establishments on the National Register of Historic Places ===
These places along Colfax Avenue have been listed on the National Register of Historic Places:

- Basilica of the Immaculate Conception
- Civic Center Historic District
- Denver Mint
- Ogden Theatre
- White Spot Restaurant
- West Side Court Building
- East High School
- Davies' Chuck Wagon Diner
- Jewish Consumptives' Relief Society
- Hill Section, Golden Hill Cemetery

== Sources ==
- Royston, Reggie (2001). "Denver's Road of Riches: Colfax Avenue". National Geographic News. National Geographic Society. Archived from the original on May 29, 2001.
