= Wellington, Colorado =

Town in Colorado, United States

Town of Wellington, Colorado
- Town
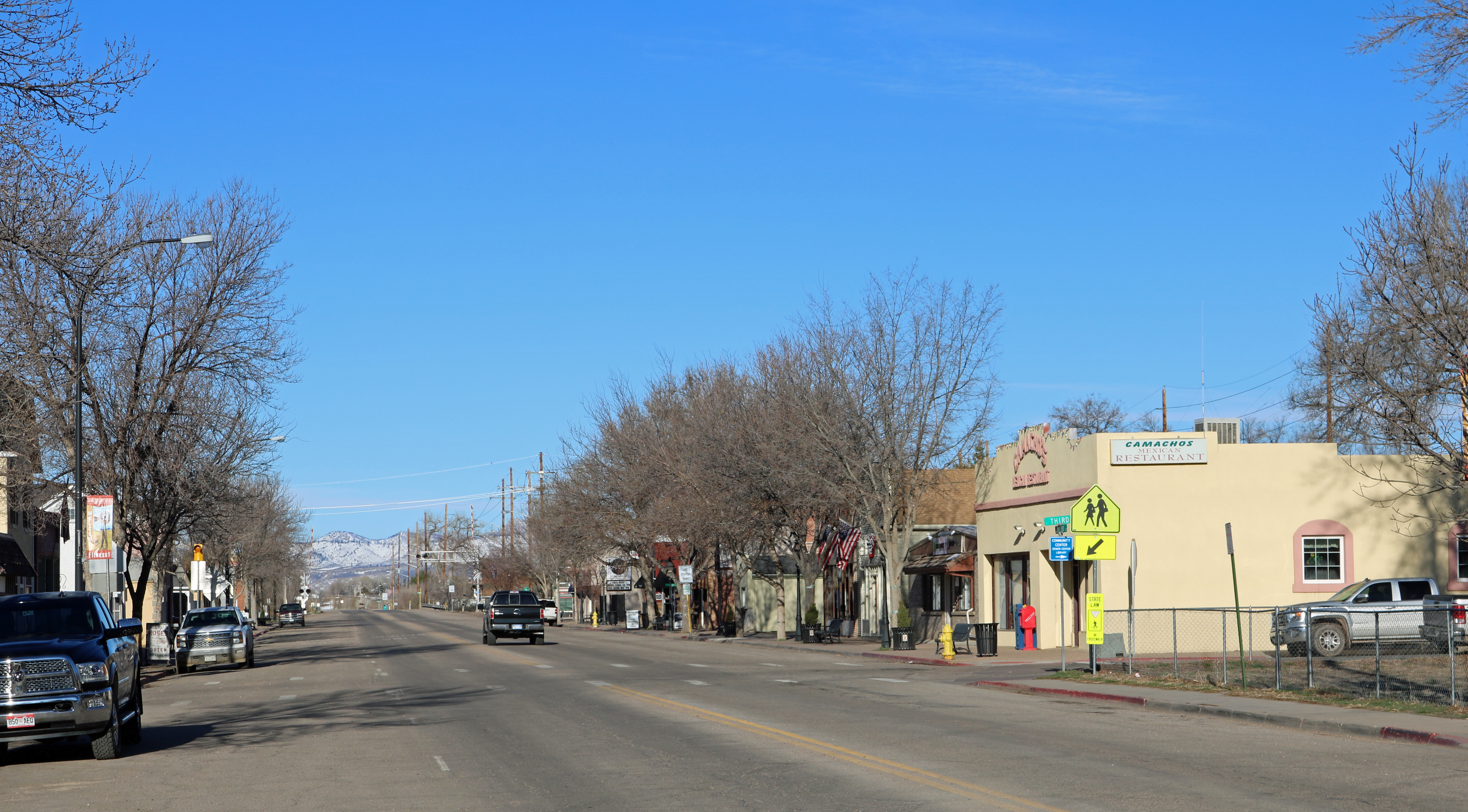
- Looking west on Cleveland Avenue in Wellington.
- Nickname: Colorado's Northern Gateway
- Location of Wellington in Larimer County, Colorado.
- Coordinates: 40°41′54″N 105°00′01″W
- Country: United States
- State: Colorado
- County: Larimer County
- Founded: 1902
- Incorporated: November 10, 1905
- Named for: C. L. Wellington

Government
  - Type: Statutory Town

Area
  - Total: 3.63 sq mi (9.41 km^{2})
  - Land: 3.63 sq mi (9.40 km^{2})
  - Water: 0.0039 sq mi (0.01 km^{2}) 0.0%
- Elevation: 5,194 ft (1,583 m)

Population (2020)
  - Total: 11,047
  - Density: 3,040/sq mi (1,180/km^{2})
- Time zone: UTC-7 (MST)
  - Summer (DST): UTC-6 (MDT)
- ZIP code: 80549
- Area code: 970
- FIPS code: 08-83230
- GNIS feature ID: 2413464
- Website: Town of Wellington

Wellington is a statutory town in Larimer County, Colorado, United States. The population was 11,047 at the 2020 census. Wellington is situated in the northern part of Colorado, and it is part of the Fort Collins-Loveland Metropolitan Statistical Area.

== Geography ==
Wellington is located at 40°42′8″N 105°0′20″W (40.702324, -105.005497).

According to the United States Census Bureau, the town has a total area of 1.8 square miles (4.7 km^{2}), all of it land.

Wellington is I-25's northernmost Colorado town.

== Demographics ==
Historical population
Census	Pop.	Note	%±
1910	459		—
1920	439		−4.4%
1930	533		21.4%
1940	465		−12.8%
1950	541		16.3%
1960	532		−1.7%
1970	691		29.9%
1980	1,215		75.8%
1990	1,340		10.3%
2000	2,672		99.4%
2010	6,289		135.4%
2020	11,047		75.7%
2023 (est.)	12,078	▲	9.3%
U.S. Decennial Census 2020

=== 2020 census ===
As of the 2020 census, Wellington had a population of 11,047. The median age was 32.9 years. 29.5% of residents were under the age of 18 and 8.3% of residents were 65 years of age or older. For every 100 females, there were 102.0 males, and for every 100 females age 18 and over, there were 100.1 males age 18 and over.

99.9% of residents lived in urban areas, while 0.1% lived in rural areas.

There were 3,794 households in Wellington, of which 44.3% had children under the age of 18 living in them. Of all households, 59.9% were married-couple households, 14.5% were households with a male householder and no spouse or partner present, and 17.6% were households with a female householder and no spouse or partner present. About 16.8% of all households were made up of individuals, and 4.5% had someone living alone who was 65 years of age or older.

There were 3,929 housing units, of which 3.4% were vacant. The homeowner vacancy rate was 1.5% and the rental vacancy rate was 3.6%.

Racial composition as of the 2020 census
Race	Number	Percent
White	9,001	81.5%
Black or African American	92	0.8%
American Indian and Alaska Native	54	0.5%
Asian	72	0.7%
Native Hawaiian and Other Pacific Islander	13	0.1%
Some other race	466	4.2%
Two or more races	1,349	12.2%
Hispanic or Latino (of any race)	1,668	15.1%

=== 2000 census ===
As of the 2000 census, there were 2,672 people, 932 households, and 693 families residing in the town. The population density was 1,509.7 inhabitants per square mile (582.9/km^{2}). There were 963 housing units at an average density of 544.1 per square mile (210.1/km^{2}). The racial makeup of the town was 87.39% White, 0.26% African American, 1.05% Native American, 0.67% Asian, 0.07% Pacific Islander, 8.23% from other races, and 2.32% from two or more races. Hispanic or Latino of any race were 12.13% of the population.

There were 932 households, out of which 46.4% had children under the age of 18 living with them, 61.1% were married couples living together, 8.8% had a female householder with no husband present, and 25.6% were non-families. 17.5% of all households were made up of individuals, and 4.2% had someone living alone who was 65 years of age or older. The average household size was 2.86 and the average family size was 3.27.

In the town, the population was spread out, with 32.7% under the age of 18, 7.6% from 18 to 24, 38.2% from 25 to 44, 16.5% from 45 to 64, and 5.1% who were 65 years of age or older. The median age was 30 years. For every 100 females, there were 99.7 males. For every 100 females age 18 and over, there were 101.0 males.

The median income for a household in the town was $47,917, and the median income for a family was $48,214. Males had a median income of $34,107 versus $25,991 for females. The per capita income for the town was $17,783. About 5.1% of families and 7.3% of the population were below the poverty line, including 8.4% of those under age 18 and 13.4% of those age 65 or over.

== Law and government ==
Wellington is a statutory town regulated by the state statutes listed in the Colorado Revised Statutes. The board of trustees may approve ordinances that pertain to local issues.

The legislative authority of the town shall be vested in a board of trustees, consisting of 1 mayor and 6 trustees. The members of the board of trustees are elected for 4-year terms and are elected at large. The mayor is elected separately.

Position	Name
Mayor	Rebekka Dailey
Trustee	Brian Mason (Mayor Pro Tem)
Trustee	Sofia Moore
Trustee	Aaron Blackstone
Trustee	Ed Cannon
Trustee	Lowrey Moyer
Trustee	Kendra Barrett
State Representative	Lori Sander
State Senator	Janice Marchman
Federal Representative	Lauren Boebert
Federal Senator	Michael Bennet
Federal Senator	John Hickenlooper

== History ==
The town was founded in 1902, incorporated in 1905, and named for C. L. Wellington (an employee of the Colorado and Southern Railroad). In the early 20th century, especially during the years of prohibition, Wellington doubled as a place to drink and a service town for drivers commuting from Cheyenne to Fort Collins and vice versa.

The town, more or less, sustained a population of 500 throughout the century which proceeded to build homes, restaurants, churches, and various other elements of small-town life. U.S. Supreme Court Justice Byron White lived in Wellington as a child. He made a point of returning to Wellington on an annual basis for his high school reunions up until 1999 when his physical health worsened significantly.

Although population remained steady throughout the 20th century, Wellington experienced substantial growth in the 1990s and 2000s, in part as a bedroom community for the city of Fort Collins, which lies 10 miles to the south.

In 2000, woolly mammoth remains were discovered by a construction crew while digging home foundations. Colorado State University sent a team to carefully excavate and preserve the bones of the extinct animals; Wellington residents watched attentively. Unfortunately, upon hoisting the remains out of the excavation site, the tusks crumbled inside of the protective forms that were previously built around them. Rear molars and parts of the skull of the mammoth are housed at CSU after being donated by the Burrus family (the developers of the project), who also kept molars of the animal. The subdivision where the bones were found named one of its streets in remembrance of the excitement.

== Education ==
Wellington is home to three schools: Rice Elementary, Eyestone Elementary and Wellington Middle-High School, all part of Poudre School District. The former Wellington Middle School was honored with many national and state awards including:

- National "School to Watch", 2012–2015
- United States Department of Education National Green Ribbon School
- A.V.I.D International Demonstration School, 2013–2016
- Colorado Environmental Leadership Bronze Medal Award Winner, 2012
- National Yearbook Program of the Year, 2012, 2013

== See also ==
- Front Range Urban Corridor
- North Central Colorado Urban Area
- Fort Collins-Loveland, CO Metropolitan Statistical Area
