= Campion, Colorado =

Unincorporated community in Larimer County, CO, USA

- unincorporated community
- Location of Campion in Larimer County, Colorado

- Location of Campion, Colorado. Campion (Colorado)
- Coordinates: 40°20′58″N 105°04′40″W
- Country: United States
- State: Colorado
- County: Larimer

Government
  - Type: unincorporated community
  - Body: Larimer County
- Elevation: 5,115 ft (1,559 m)

Population (2000)
  - Total: 1,832
- Time zone: UTC−07:00 (MST)
  - Summer (DST): UTC−06:00 (MDT)
- ZIP code: Loveland 80537
- GNIS pop ID: 178078

Campion is an unincorporated community located in southeastern Larimer County, Colorado, United States. A former census-designated place (CDP), the population was 1,832 at the United States Census 2000.

== Etymology ==
Campion was named for John F. Campion, a railroad official.

== Geography ==
Campion is located between Loveland and Berthoud along U.S. Route 287.

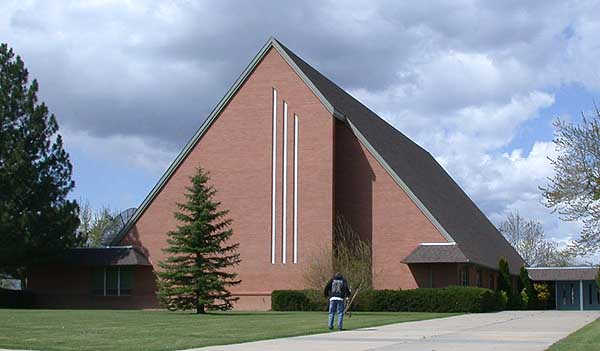
Church on the campus of Campion Academy

== Demographics ==
former Campion CDP, Colorado
Year	Pop.	±%
1990	1,692	—
2000	1,832	+8.3%
Source: United States Census Bureau

== See also ==
- Fort Collins-Loveland, CO Metropolitan Statistical Area
- Front Range Urban Corridor
