= Colorado State Highway 22 =

State highway in Brighton, Colorado, United States

State Highway 22
- 124th Avenue
- SH 22 highlighted in red

Route information
- Maintained by CDOT
- Length: 2.477 mi (3.986 km)

Major junctions
- West end: Brighton Road in Henderson
- US 85 at Henderson
- East end: Sable Boulevard in Brighton

Location
- Country: United States
- State: Colorado
- Counties: Adams

Highway system
- Colorado State Highway System; Interstate; US; State; Scenic
← SH 21	→ SH 23

State Highway 22 (SH 22), also known as 124th Avenue, is a 2.477-mile (3.986 km) state highway in Brighton, Colorado, United States, that connects Brighton Road with Sable Boulevard.

== Route description ==
SH 22 begins at Sable Boulevard (formerly Colorado State Highway 2. From its easter terminus, it winds westward, crossing several major streets in the city. After crossing U.S. Route 85 (US 85) it exits the Brighton urban area boundary. Continuing on, the route crosses the Fulton Canal and ends at Brighton Road, just north of the unincorporated community of Henderson.

Throughout its entire length, SH 22 remains a two-lane road. Along its route, there are traffic lights at various intersections to control traffic flow.

== History ==
The route was established in early 1940s, first numbered as SH 128. In 1954, it was renumbered to SH 22. The route was paved, as it is today, in 1963.

== Major intersections ==
The entire route is in Brighton, Adams County.

mi	km	Destinations	Notes
2.476	3.985	Henderson Road west – Riverdale Road	Continuation west from western terminus
2.476	3.985	Brighton Road	Western terminus
1.835	2.953	US 85 north (CanAm Highway) – E-470 (toll road), Fort Lupton, Greeley US 85 south (CanAm Highway) – Denver	E-470 east connect with Denver International Airport
0.000	0.000	Sable Boulevard	Eastern terminus; formerly SH 2
0.000	0.000	Valente Drive east	Continuation east from eastern terminus
1.000 mi = 1.609 km; 1.000 km = 0.621 mi

== See also ==
- List of state highways in Colorado
