= Colorado State Highway 263 =

State highway in Colorado, United States

State Highway 263

- Map of Weld County in northern Colorado with SH 263 highlighted in red

Route information
- Maintained by CDOT
- Length: 2.733 mi (4.398 km)
- Existed: 1939–2021

Major junctions
- West end: US 85 Bus. in Greeley
- East end: Fern Road in Greeley

Location
- Country: United States
- State: Colorado
- Counties: Weld

Highway system
- Colorado State Highway System; Interstate; US; State; Scenic
← SH 257	→ SH 265

State Highway 263 (SH 263) was a 2.73-mile-long (4.39 km), two-lane state highway located within the city limits of Greeley, Colorado. The average daily traffic of the route, which was recorded in 2008, was about 5700 cars entering at the junction with U.S. Highway 85, and 4700 cars exiting at the intersection with Fern Avenue. It was classified as a Major Urban Collector highway by the Colorado Department of Transportation, and does not have any truck limitations.

== Route description ==
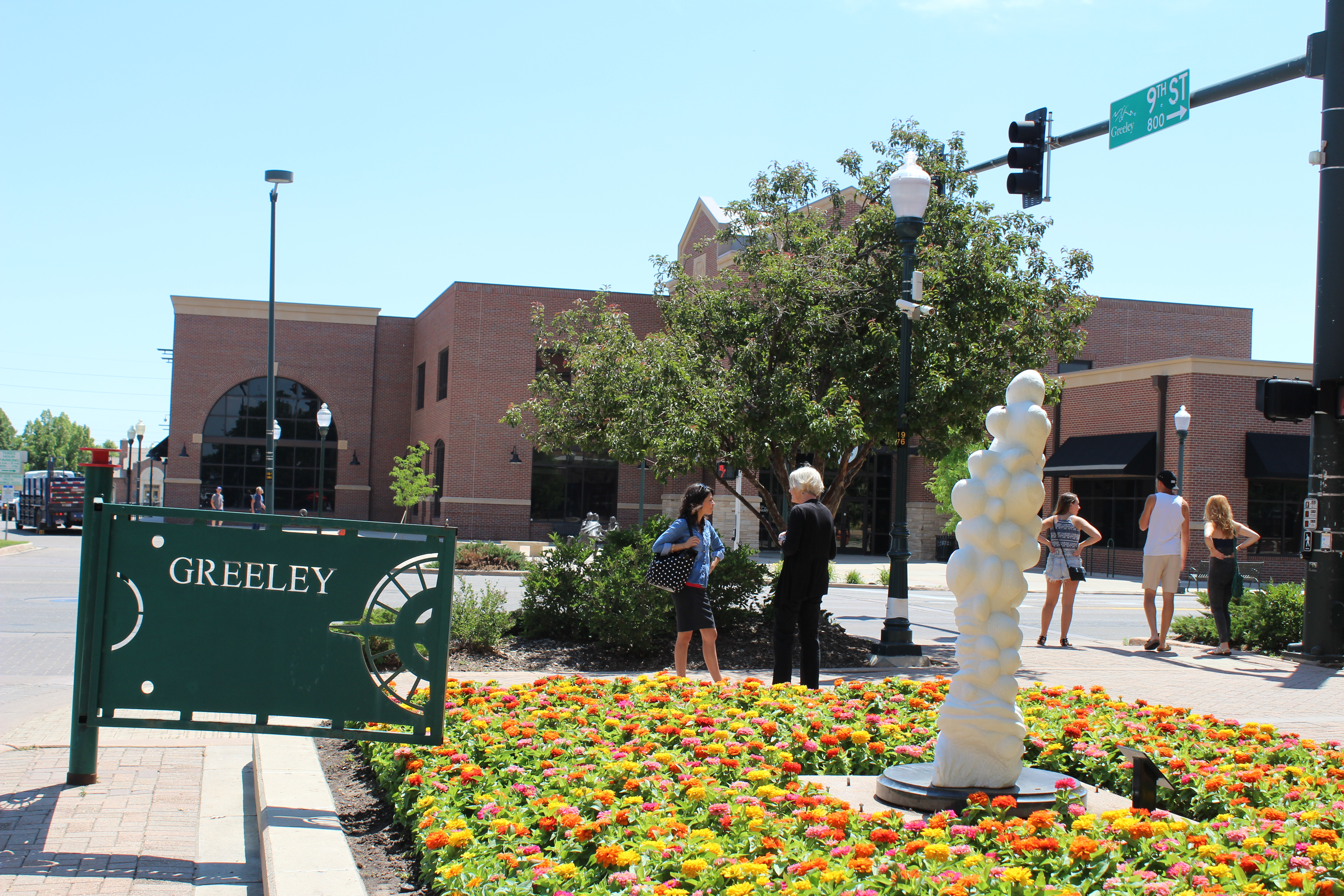
Downtown Greeley

The route began at the junction with U.S. Route 85 Business (US 85 Bus.) east of downtown Greeley. Within the town, it is known as 8th Street. 8th Street itself beings at an intersection with 26th Avenue inside the town As it begins to exit metropolitan Greeley, the road passes over the Cache La Poudre River. From there, the highway heads east on 8th Street out of town. After that, it continues on for a while, past a junction with former SH 37 until it reaches Fern Avenue, where it abruptly turns into a county road, near the beginning of Greeley-Weld Airport and the Sand Creek.

== History ==
The highway was constructed and opened in 1939. At that time, it extended from U.S. Highway 85 (then known as 11th Avenue in Greeley) east out of town and ended at State Highway 37 north of Kersey. At some point the location of U.S. Highway 85 was moved to 8th Avenue, so the highway then had its west end there, for a total length of 6.74 miles from U.S. Highway 85 to State Highway 37. The highway was paved by 1946. Even after the construction of the U.S. Highway 85 Bypass half a mile to the east, turning the former US 85 into US 85 Business, the highway continued to have its west end at U.S. Highway 85. In March 2007, two sections of the highway were turned back (removed) as part of the North Front Range Route Swap. The first was near U.S. Highway 85, and the second from Fern Avenue to State Highway 37. The final remaining stretch of the highway was turned back to City of Greeley in 2021. It is now E 8th St.

== Major intersections ==
The entire route was in Greeley, Weld County.

mi	km	Destinations	Notes
0.000	0.000	US 85 Bus. (8th Avenue)	Western terminus
0.635	1.022	US 85 – Eaton, Denver	
2.733	4.398	Fern Road	Continuation east; access to Greeley-Weld County Airport
1.000 mi = 1.609 km; 1.000 km = 0.621 mi
