= Colorado State Highway 38 =

Colorado State Highway 38 may refer to the following in Colorado, United States:

- U.S. Route 38 in Colorado, former section of U.S. Numbered Highway that connected Greeley with U.S. Route 38 in Nebraska and is now designated as part of U.S. Route 34 in Colorado
- Colorado State Highway 38 (pre-2007), a former state highway along West Fillmore Street in Colorado Springs, that connected Interstate 25 with the former Interstate 25 Business (North Nevada Avenue)
- Colorado State Highway 38 (pre-1953), a former state highway (from about 1938 to 1953)
