= Colorado State Highway 24 =

Colorado State Highway 24 may refer to:

- U.S. Route 24 in Colorado, the only Colorado highway numbered 24 since 1968
- Colorado State Highway 24 (1938-1953) south of Holyoke
- Colorado State Highway 24 (pre-1968) north of Denver, now SH 44
