= Colorado State Highway 2 =

State highway in Colorado, United States

State Highway 2
- Current SH 2 highlighted in red; former SH 2 in blue

Route information
- Maintained by CDOT
- Length: 19.880 mi (31.994 km)

Major junctions
- South end: US 285 in Denver
- I-25 / US 87 in Denver; I-70 BL / US 40 / US 287 in Denver; I-70 in Denver; US 6 / US 85 in Commerce City; I-270 / US 36 in Commerce City
- North end: I-76 / US 6 in Brighton

Location
- Country: United States
- State: Colorado
- Counties: Denver, Arapahoe, Adams

Highway system
- Colorado State Highway System; Interstate; US; State; Scenic
← SH 1	→ SH 3

State Highway 2 (SH 2) is a state highway of the U.S. state of Colorado. It runs for approximately 20 miles (32 km) north–south entirely within the urbanized environment of the Denver Metropolitan Area. It is one of the major north–south thoroughfares of east Denver, where it is known as Colorado Boulevard.

== Route description ==
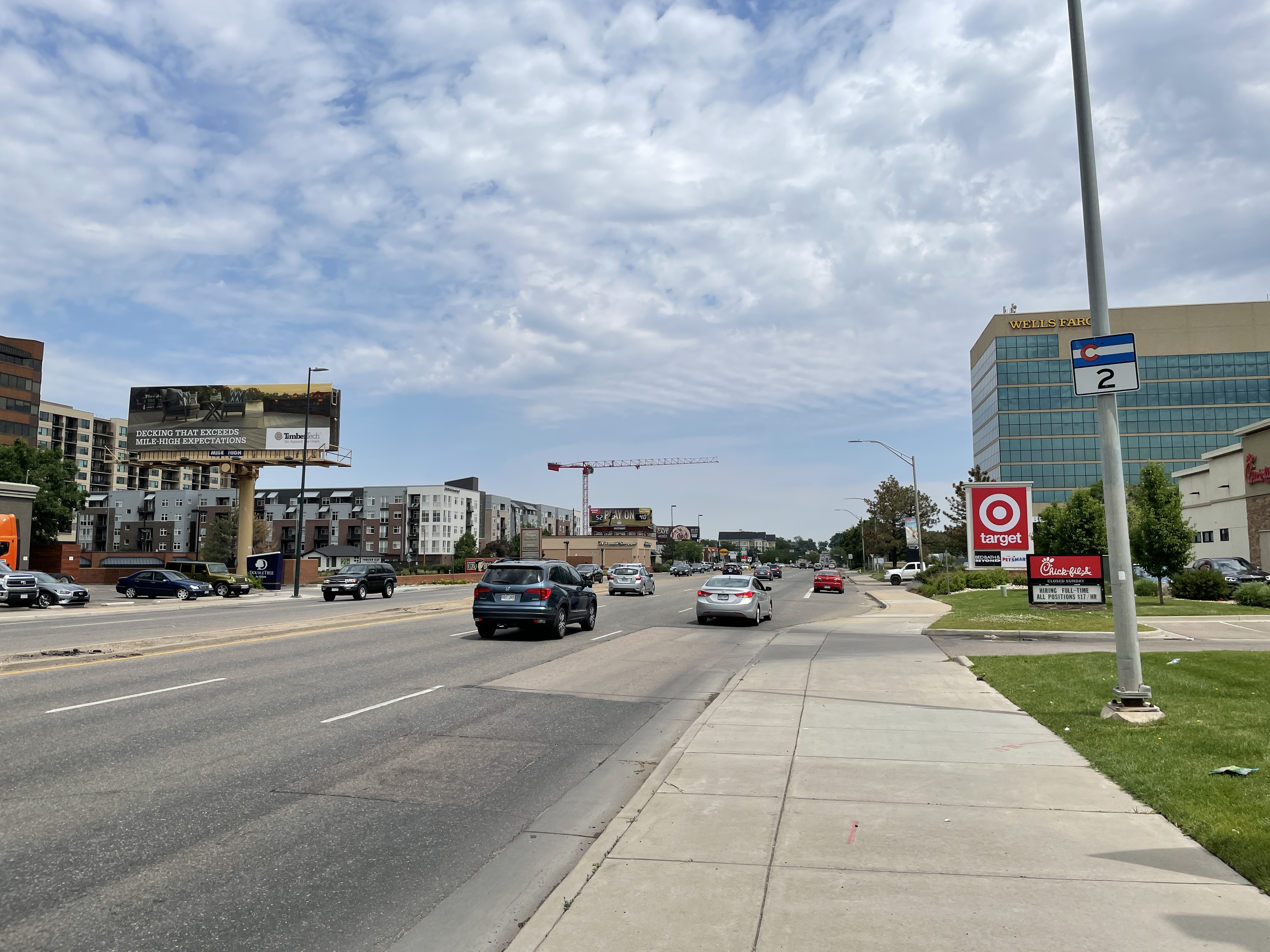
SH 2 northbound past Cherry Creek North Drive/Virginia Avenue in Denver

On its southern end, it begins at U.S. Route 285 (US 285) in Cherry Hills Village, just south of the Denver city limits in Arapahoe County. It goes north through Denver, intersecting Interstate 25 (I-25) and US 87 at exit 204. It intersects SH 83 near Cherry Creek and then US 40, US 287, and Interstate 70 Business (also known as Colfax Avenue) east of downtown Denver. It then passes along the east side of Denver City Park, before intersecting I-70 at exit 276. It then merges with US 6 and US 85 through Commerce City, until it branches off from US 6 and US 85 to the northeast, passing along the northwest boundary of the Rocky Mountain Arsenal National Wildlife Refuge. It terminates at its northern end at I-76 and US 6 at exit 15 on the south edge of Brighton.

== History ==
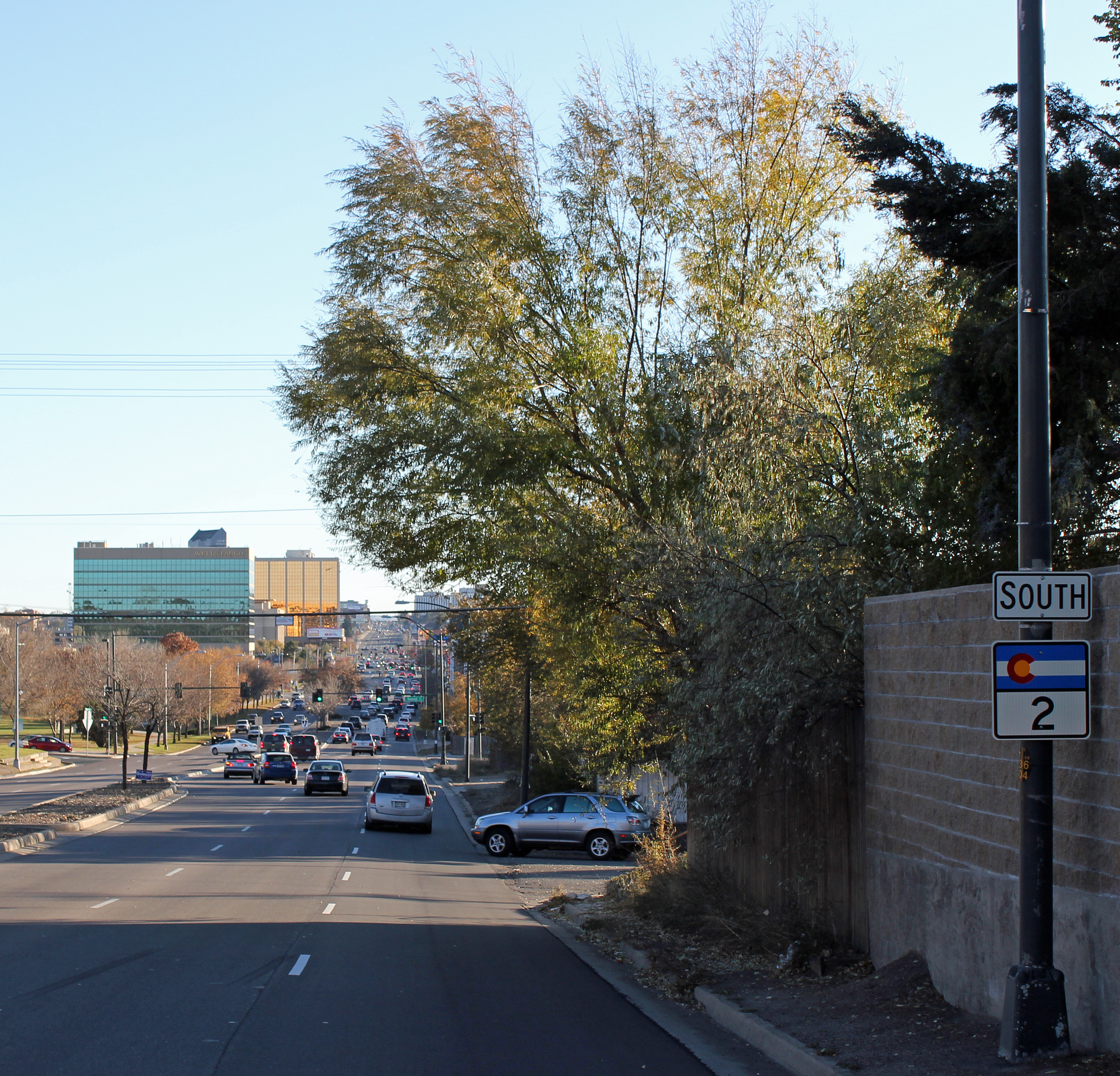
SH 2 looking south from just north of Ellsworth Avenue in Denver

The route was established in the 1920s beginning on the Utah border at US 40. It then followed US 40 all the way to Denver, where it followed Colfax Avenue through Denver. It then followed various streets northeast along US 85 north to Greeley, where it turned abruptly eastward along US 34 to US 6, where it continued to Sterling and finally along US 138 to the Nebraska border. By 1946, the route was rerouted in an area northeast of Denver. It was then changed in 1950 so it followed Colfax Avenue east through Denver. The route was rerouted in 1968 from US 285 to I-80S (now I-76). The now-deleted portion along Quebec Street was changed in 1971, and the route was finally set to its current routing in 1998.

== Major intersections ==
County	Location	mi	km	Destinations	Notes
City and County of Denver		0.000	0.000	US 285 (Hampden Avenue) / Colorado Boulevard south	Southern terminus; road continues into Arapahoe County as Colorado Boulevard
City and County of Denver		2.121	3.413	I-25 (US 87) – Ft. Collins	I-25 exit 204
City and County of Denver		4.377	7.044	SH 83 south (Leetsdale Drive)	
City and County of Denver		5.993	9.645	I-70 BL / US 40 / US 287 (Colfax Avenue) – National Jewish	
City and County of Denver		8.725	14.042	I-70 to US 6 / US 85 – Aurora, Limon, Grand Junction	I-70 exit 276B
Adams	Commerce City	9.840	15.836	US 6 west / US 85 south (Vasquez Boulevard south)	Interchange; north end state maintenance; southbound exit and eastbound entrance; western end of US 6/US 85 overlap
Adams	Commerce City	10.040– 10.339	16.158– 16.639	I-270 (US 36) – Boulder, Limon	Partial cloverleaf interchange; no eastbound exit to I-270 east; I-270 exits 2A-B
Adams	Commerce City	10.860	17.477	US 6 east / US 85 north	Interchange; left exits and entrance; no eastbound entrance; eastern end of US 6/US 85 overlap
Adams	Commerce City	17.750	28.566	SH 44 west (104th Avenue)	
Adams	O'Brian Canal	19.506	31.392	West end state maintenance	
Adams	Brighton	19.880	31.994	I-76 (US 6)	Eastern terminus; I-76 exit 16; road continues north as Sable Boulevard
1.000 mi = 1.609 km; 1.000 km = 0.621 mi: Concurrency terminus; Incomplete access
