= Interstate 270 (Colorado) =

Highway in Colorado

Interstate 270
- Dwight D. Eisenhower Highway
- I-270 highlighted in red

Route information
- Auxiliary route of I-70
- Maintained by CDOT
- Length: 7.107 mi (11.438 km)
- Existed: 1965–present
- NHS: Entire route

Major junctions
- West end: I-25 / US 36 / US 87 in Welby
- I-76 in North Washington; US 6 / US 85 / SH 2 in Commerce City
- East end: I-70 / US 36 in Denver

Location
- Country: United States
- State: Colorado
- Counties: Adams, Denver

Highway system
- Interstate Highway System; Main; Auxiliary; Suffixed; Business; Future; Colorado State Highway System; Interstate; US; State; Scenic
← SH 266	→ US 285

Interstate 270 (I-270) is a seven-mile-long (11 km) auxiliary Interstate Highway located in the northeastern part of the Denver metropolitan area in the US state of Colorado. It overlaps U.S. Highway 36 (US 36) for its entire length and is also a part of the Dwight D. Eisenhower Highway, which spans from I-270 and the Capital Beltway in Bethesda, Maryland, to I-80/US 101 in San Francisco, California. The western terminus of I-270 is at the interchange with I-25 and US 36. It heads eastward to an interchange with I-76, where the mileposts reset because of a previous freeway extension. The freeway heads southeast and comes to meet Vasquez Boulevard, where it enters Commerce City. The road crosses Quebec Street before ending at I-70.

Ground was broken on the first segment of I-270 in 1965, and the freeway was completed three years later, stretching from I-70 to Vasquez Boulevard. The road was then extended to I-76 two years later. The section between I-25 and I-76 was completed in 1999. Since completion, this section has undergone much construction to renew bridges over Clear Creek and Washington Street. Because the western end of I-270 is close to the junction of I-25 and I-76, some traffic movements to I-25 can only be made by using I-76.

== Route description ==
I-270 begins at an interchange with I-25 in Welby and is concurrent with US 36. The speed limit through the first section is 45 mph (72 km/h). The freeway heads southeastward for about one mile (1.6 km), crossing over Washington Street and State Highway 224 (SH 224), but access is not provided to either road. Mileposts along I-270 reset to 0 at the I-76 interchange because it was the original western end of the Interstate. Since the I-76 interchange is close to both I-270's western end and the I-25/I-76 interchanges, some movements in the interchange are missing. Eastbound I-270 traffic cannot access westbound I-76 nor can eastbound I-76 traffic access westbound I-270. However, traffic on I-25 can access both westbound I-76 and eastbound I-270, thus completing the missing movements. The three interchanges work together by eliminating bottlenecks caused by redundant interchanges.

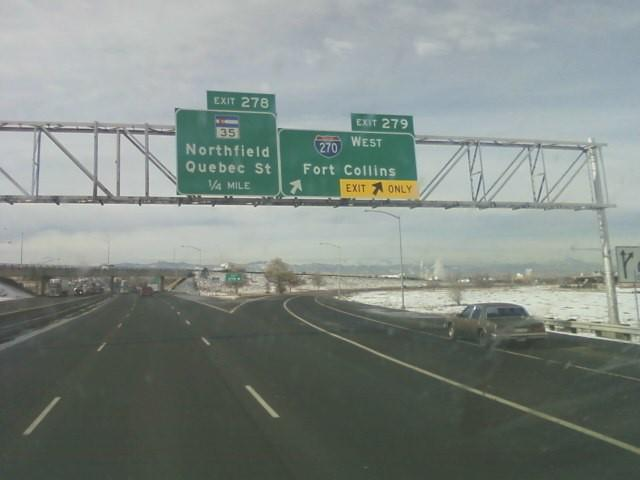
I-270 exit along I-70

Beyond the I-76 interchange, the speed limit increases to 55 mph (89 km/h). The freeway heads southeast, comes to a westbound exit and eastbound entrance with York Street, and crosses the South Platte River into a commercial area in Adams County. I-270 enters the city of Commerce City, running roughly parallel with the nearby Sand Creek and crossing over SH 265 without an exit. Continuing through the city, the route comes to a cloverleaf interchange with Vasquez Boulevard, which carries US 6, US 85, and SH 2. The freeway heads eastward into Denver, where it has an exit at SH 35, a short highway which continues northward along Quebec Street for one mile (1.6 km). Quebec Street provides access for traffic heading to westbound I-70. The route ends shortly thereafter when it merges into I-70.

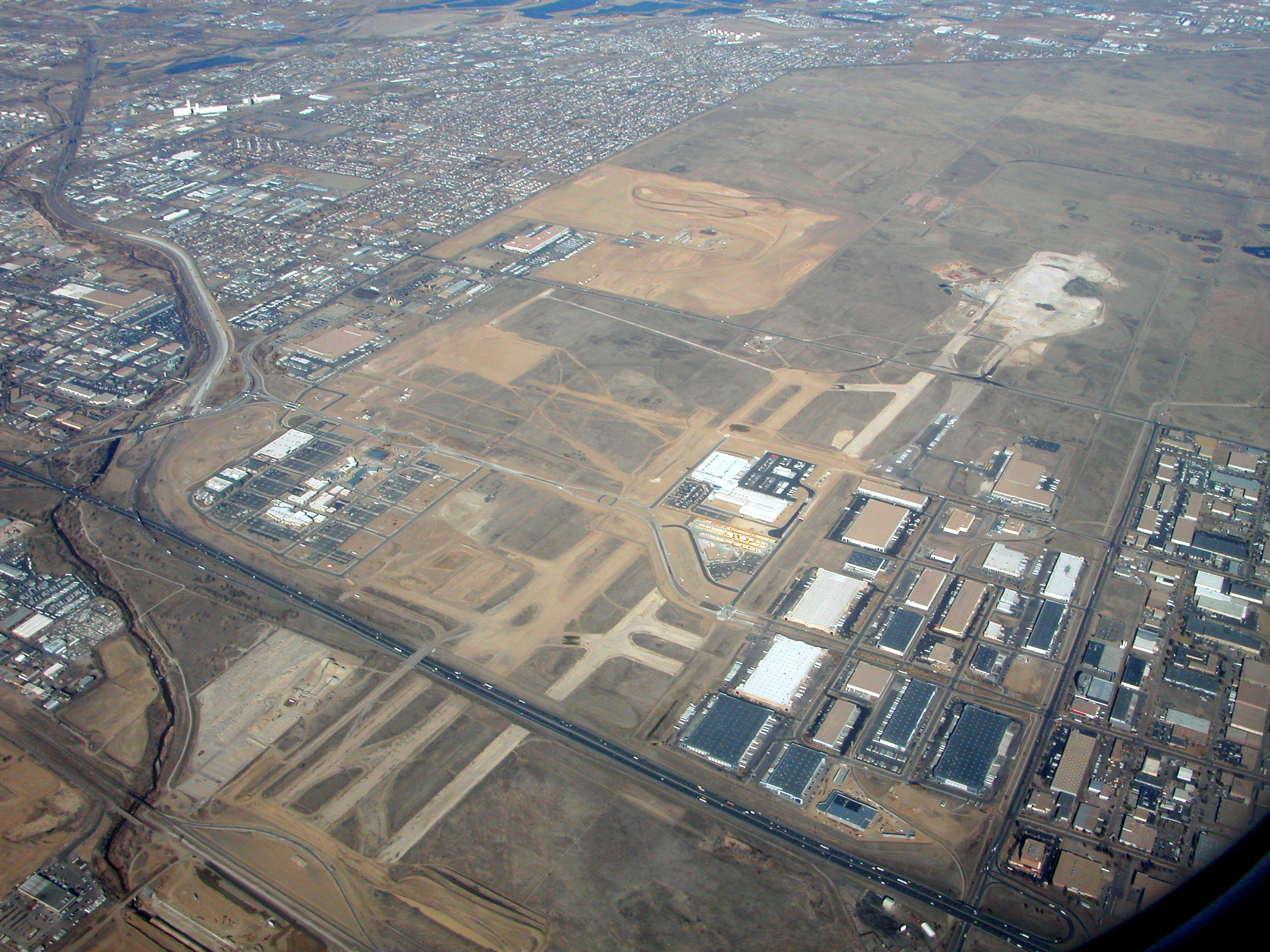
Former site of Stapleton International Airport, located east of I-270. I-270's interchange with I-70 can be seen in the far left.

The freeway is maintained by the Colorado Department of Transportation (CDOT), who is responsible for maintaining and constructing transportation infrastructure in Colorado, including highways. As part of this role, CDOT periodically conducts surveys on their highways to measure traffic volume. This is expressed in terms of annual average daily traffic (AADT), which is a measure of traffic volume for any average day of the year. In 2009, CDOT calculated that as few as 56,500 vehicles used I-270 daily east of its western terminus at I-25 and as many as 89,600 vehicles used I-270 daily southeast of York Street in Commerce City. As part of the Interstate Highway System, the entire route is listed on the National Highway System, a system of roads that are important to the nation's economy, defense, and mobility.

== History ==
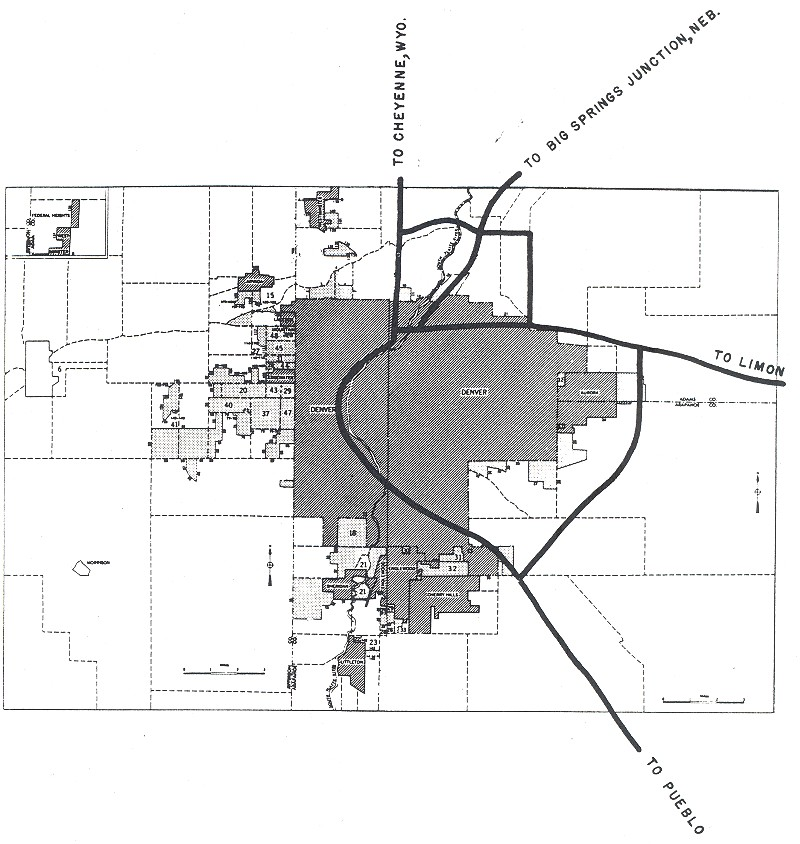
1955 map showing planned Interstate Highways around Denver

The Colorado Department of Highways originally planned to use a single number, I-25E, for the entirety of Denver's eastern loop. The designation was changed to I-225 following correspondence with the American Association of State Highway Officials and split, with the northern leg becoming I-425 in 1958. The northern leg was then renumbered to I-270 on February 26, 1959, following a request from the Colorado Department of Highways to reflect that it would terminate at I-80S (now I-76) instead of I-25.

I-270 was constructed in several phases, beginning with a section from I-70 to Vasquez Boulevard. Following this section was another part of the freeway from Vasquez Boulevard west to I-76, and finally a section from US 36 to I-76. This last segment has undergone much more construction, including new bridges and ramps at interchanges.

=== Construction ===
Construction on I-270 began in 1965. The first portion cost about $2.7 million (equivalent to $18.5 million in 2024). It opened in 1968, connecting I-70 to Vasquez Boulevard. Two years later, another two-mile (3.2 km) segment connected the portion already in service to I-80S. I-80S became I-76 in 1976. Construction began on the section between I-76 and I-25 in April 1993 and was finished in September 1999, costing $11.4 million (equivalent to $20.1 million in 2024). The mileposts were already established when construction took place, so the route was not assigned new mileposts. Completion of this portion largely decreased traffic problems in the area.

=== Improvements ===
The bridges along westbound I-270 over Washington Street were replaced and finished in the late 1990s, costing $12 million (equivalent to $25.4 million in 2024). By the end of 1998, the bridges over Clear Creek near the I-76 interchange were completed. In February 2000, a connection between westbound I-270 and westbound US 36 was completed, as was access between I-76 westbound and I-270 westbound. The eastbound section between US 36 and I-76, including new bridges over Washington Street and Clear Creek, was completed in March 2002 and totaled $8.5 million (equivalent to $14.1 million in 2024). Three years later, a flyover ramp was constructed connecting I-25 southbound to I-270 eastbound. However, access between I-270 eastbound and I-76 westbound still does not exist.

== Future ==
Citing its significance as a freight corridor, in 2002, the Denver Regional Council of Governments (DRCOG) recommended widening I-270 from four to six lanes by 2025, and it later identified widening I-270 and rebuilding the I-270/Vasquez Boulevard interchange in its 2040 Fiscally Constrained Regional Transportation Plan. CDOT also maintained an interest in widening the freeway through the 2000s and 2010s, though funding was not available. In October 2019, they listed the study and reconstruction of I-270 from I-76 and I-70 among projects to receive funding from Senate Bill 17-267; the reconstruction would include toll lanes, and toll revenue would be used to cover costs not paid by SB 17-267.

In early 2020, CDOT included widening I-270 between I-76 and I-70 in the first phase of projects of their 10-year vision. The High Performance Transportation Enterprise, a business within CDOT, additionally ranked I-270 fourth among its top priority corridors for managed lanes, placing it after three segments of I-25 in the Denver metropolitan area. CDOT began a National Environmental Policy Act (NEPA) study of I-270 in April 2020, scheduled to finish in late 2021 but noted that budget cuts in response to the COVID-19 pandemic could affect the project.

== Exit list ==
County	Location	mi	km	Exit	Destinations	Notes
Adams	Welby	0.000	0.000	—	US 36 west (Denver–Boulder Turnpike) – Boulder	Continuation west
Adams	Welby			0	I-25 north (US 87 north) – Fort Collins	Exit 217 on I-25
Adams		1.100 0.000	1.770 0.000	1	I-76 east – Fort Morgan	Eastbound exit and westbound entrance; exit 6 on I-76
Adams		0.385	0.620	1	I-76 / York Street – Fort Morgan, Grand Junction	Westbound exit and eastbound entrance; exit 6 on I-76
Adams	Commerce City	2.358	3.795	2	US 6 / US 85 (US 6 / Vasquez Boulevard) / SH 2	Partial cloverleaf interchange; signed as exits 2A (north) and 2B (south)
City and County of Denver		4.569	7.353	4	Northfield Quebec Street (SH 35)	Eastbound exit and westbound entrance
City and County of Denver		5.378	8.655	5	Central Park Boulevard	Eastbound exit and westbound entrance
City and County of Denver		5.986	9.634	—	I-70 east (US 36 east) – Aurora, Limon	Eastern end of US 36 concurrency; eastern terminus; exit 279A on I-70; access to Denver International Airport
1.000 mi = 1.609 km; 1.000 km = 0.621 mi: Concurrency terminus; Incomplete access
