= Colorado State Highway 265 =

State highway in Colorado, United States

State Highway 265
- SH 265 highlighted in red

Route information
- Maintained by CDOT
- Length: 3.621 mi (5.827 km)

Major junctions
- South end: I-70 in Denver
- North end: US 6 / US 85 in Commerce City

Location
- Country: United States
- State: Colorado
- Counties: Adams, Denver

Highway system
- Colorado State Highway System; Interstate; US; State; Scenic
← SH 263	→ SH 266

State Highway 265 (SH 265) is a Colorado state highway linking Denver and Commerce City. SH 265's southern terminus is at Interstate 70 (I-70) in Denver, and the northern terminus is at U.S. Route 6 (US 6) and US 85 in Commerce City.

== Route description ==
SH 265 runs 3.6 miles (5.8 km), starting at a junction with I-70 in Denver. The highway then turns northeast and runs along Brighton Boulevard, entering Commerce City. It then goes over Sand Creek and passes under I-270 without any access to it. The road continues northeast and ends at a junction with US 6 / US 85 in northern Commerce City. Most of its segment inside Denver is maintained locally.

== History ==
The current alignment of SH 265 was originally a part of US 85 before it was rerouted onto Vasquez Boulevard in 1942, with SH 265 being designated over it. The section south of York Street was part of the original routing of SH 224 until 1954, when it was rerouted and SH 265 was extended south onto this segment where it exists today.

== Major intersections ==
County	Location	mi	km	Destinations	Notes
City and County of Denver		0.000	0.000	I-70	Southern terminus; I-70 exit 275B; road continues as Brighton Boulevard south
City and County of Denver		0.147	0.237	47th Avenue – Public library, National Western Stock Show parking	North end of state maintenance
Denver–Adams county line	Denver–Commerce City line	1.177	1.894	BNSF Railway underpass South end of state maintenance	
Adams	Commerce City	3.394– 3.621	5.462– 5.827	US 6 / US 85	Northern terminus
1.000 mi = 1.609 km; 1.000 km = 0.621 mi

== See also ==
- List of state highways in Colorado
