= Colorado State Highway 16 =

State highway in Colorado, United States

State Highway 16
- Mesa Ridge Parkway
- SH 16 highlighted in red

Route information
- Maintained by CDOT
- Length: 3.118 mi (5.018 km)
- Existed: 1970–present
- History: 2007: Extended east

Major junctions
- West end: I-25 / US 87 on Fort Carson-Fountain border
- US 85 in Fountain
- East end: SH 21 in Fountain

Location
- Country: United States
- State: Colorado
- Counties: El Paso

Highway system
- Colorado State Highway System; Interstate; US; State; Scenic
← SH 15	→ SH 17

State Highway 16 (SH 16) is 3.118-mile (5.018 km) east–west state highway in El Paso County, Colorado, United States, that connects Interstate 25/U.S. Route 87 (I-25/US 87) on the border of Fort Carson and Fountain with Colorado State Highway 21 (SH 21) in Fountain. SH 16 constitutes the westernmost portion of a longer road known as the Mesa Ridge Parkway.

== Route description ==
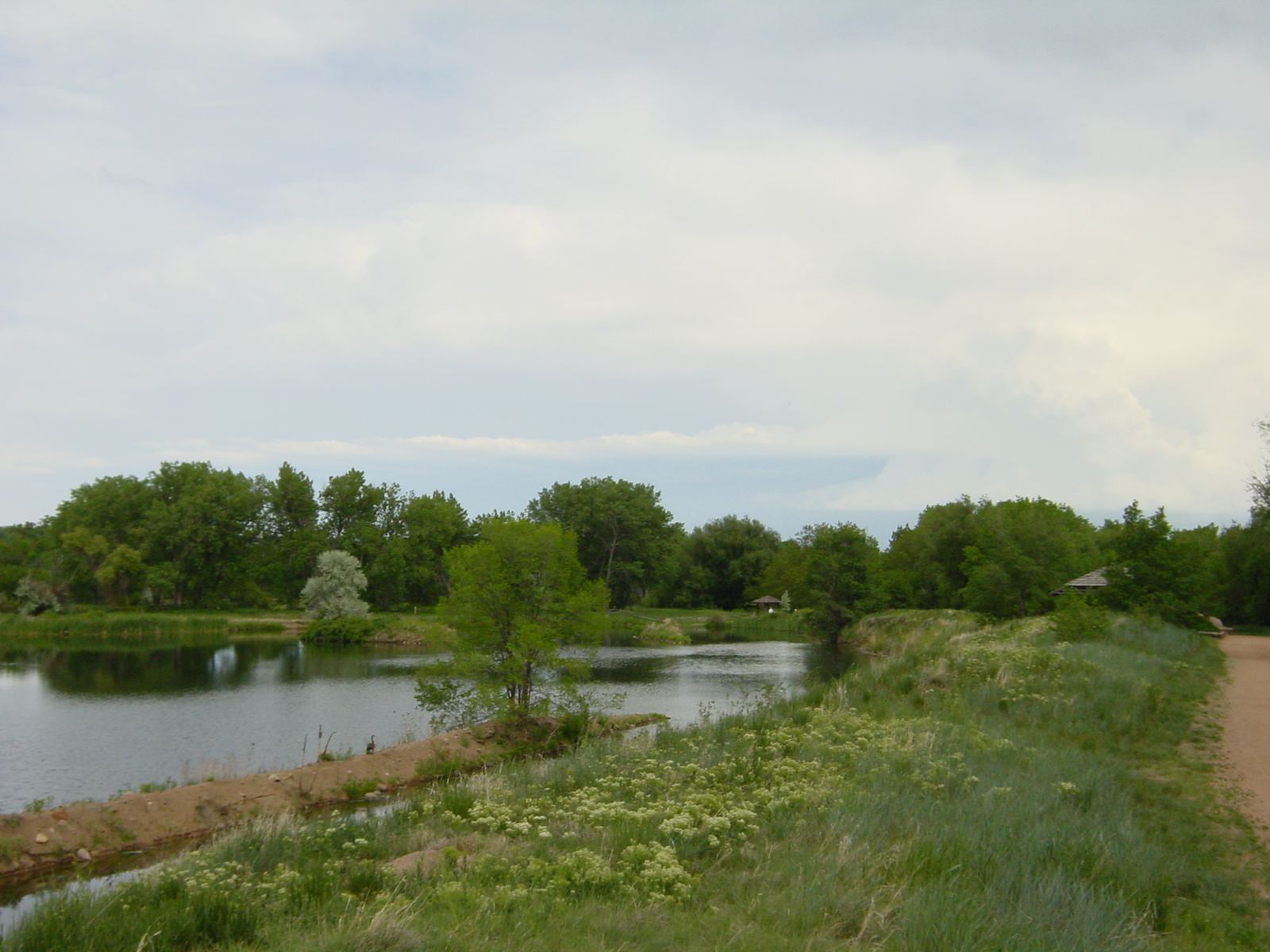
Fountain Creek near Fountain and SH 16, May 2001

SH 16 is a four-lane expressway for its entire length. It begins at an interchange with I-25/US 87 (Exit 132). (McGrath Avenue heads west from the interchange through Fort Carson.) From its western terminus SH 16 heads east with a 45 mph speed limit. After briefly leaving the city limits of Fountain, the highway crosses over Fountain Creek.

Just after re-entering Fountain, SH 16 passes over the CanAm Highway/North Santa Fe Avenue (U.S. Route 85), forming a partial cloverleaf interchange. (US 85 heads north through Security-Widefield and Stratmoor before merging with I-25/US 87. US 85 heads south to also merge with I-25/US 87.)

After the interchange with US 85, the speed limit increases to 55 mph and the route makes a southeast trajectory through neighborhoods in northern Fountain. SH 16 then turns to the northeast and reaches its eastern terminus at an intersection with the southern end of SH 21 (Powers Boulevard) at a T intersection. (From the eastern terminus Mesa Ridge Parkway continues east and SH 21 heads north through Security-Widefield and into Colorado Springs to end at U.S. Route 24.).

== History ==
The route was established in 1970 and the first mile was constructed from I-25 east to US 85 (CanAm Highway). It was gradually extended in 2007 from CanAm Highway/Santa Fe Avenue to Powers Boulevard, when Mesa Ridge Parkway was added to the route, and the route length almost tripled.

== Major intersections ==
The entire route is in El Paso County.

Location	mi	km	Destinations	Notes
Fort Carson	0.000	0.000	McGrath Avenue west	Continuation west from western terminus
Fort Carson–Fountain line	0.000	0.000	I-25 north (Ronald Reagan Highway) / US 85 north / US 87 north – Colorado Springs I-25 south (Ronald Reagan Highway) / US 85 south / US 87 south – Pueblo	Western terminus; I-25 exit 132
			Bridge over Fountain Creek)	
Fountain	0.996	1.603	North Santa Fe Avenue	Partial cloverleaf interchange
Fountain	3.118	5.018	Mesa Ridge Parkway east	Eastern terminus; T intersection
Fountain	3.118	5.018	SH 21 north (Powers Boulevard) – Security-Widefield, Colorado Springs, US 24	Continuation north from eastern terminus
1.000 mi = 1.609 km; 1.000 km = 0.621 mi: Route transition

== See also ==
- List of state highways in Colorado
