= Colorado State Highway 21 =

Highway in Colorado

State Highway 21
- Powers Boulevard
- Map of El Paso County in central Colorado with SH 21 highlighted in red, and Future SH 21 in blue

Route information
- Maintained by CDOT
- Length: 20.245 mi (32.581 km)
- Existed: 2007–present

Major junctions
- South end: SH 16 in Fountain
- US 24 in Colorado Springs
- North end: SH 83 in Colorado Springs; I-25 / US 85 / US 87 in Colorado Springs (Future)

Location
- Country: United States
- State: Colorado
- Counties: El Paso

Highway system
- Colorado State Highway System; Interstate; US; State; Scenic
← SH 17	→ SH 22

State Highway 21 (SH 21), also known as Powers Boulevard, is an expressway in El Paso County, in eastern Colorado Springs. SH 21 currently extends from SH 16 (Mesa Ridge Parkway) in Fountain at its southern end to Interquest Parkway/SH 83 in the north side of Colorado Springs. Extensions to I-25 near North Gate Boulevard are in progress, and extensions south to I-25 near Pikes Peak International Raceway are proposed, and the road is planned to be converted to a freeway in the long-term future.

== Route description ==
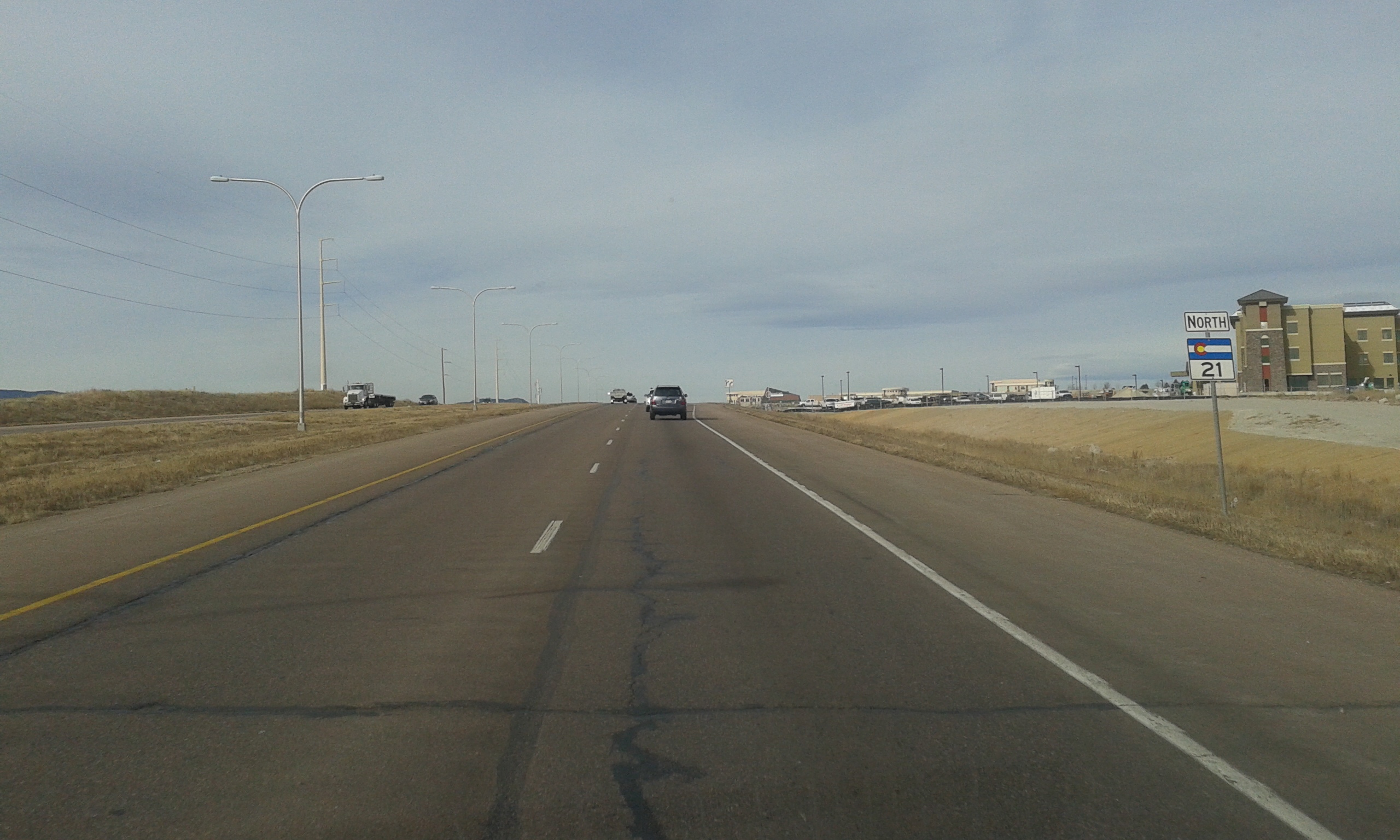
SH 21 northbound in Colorado Springs

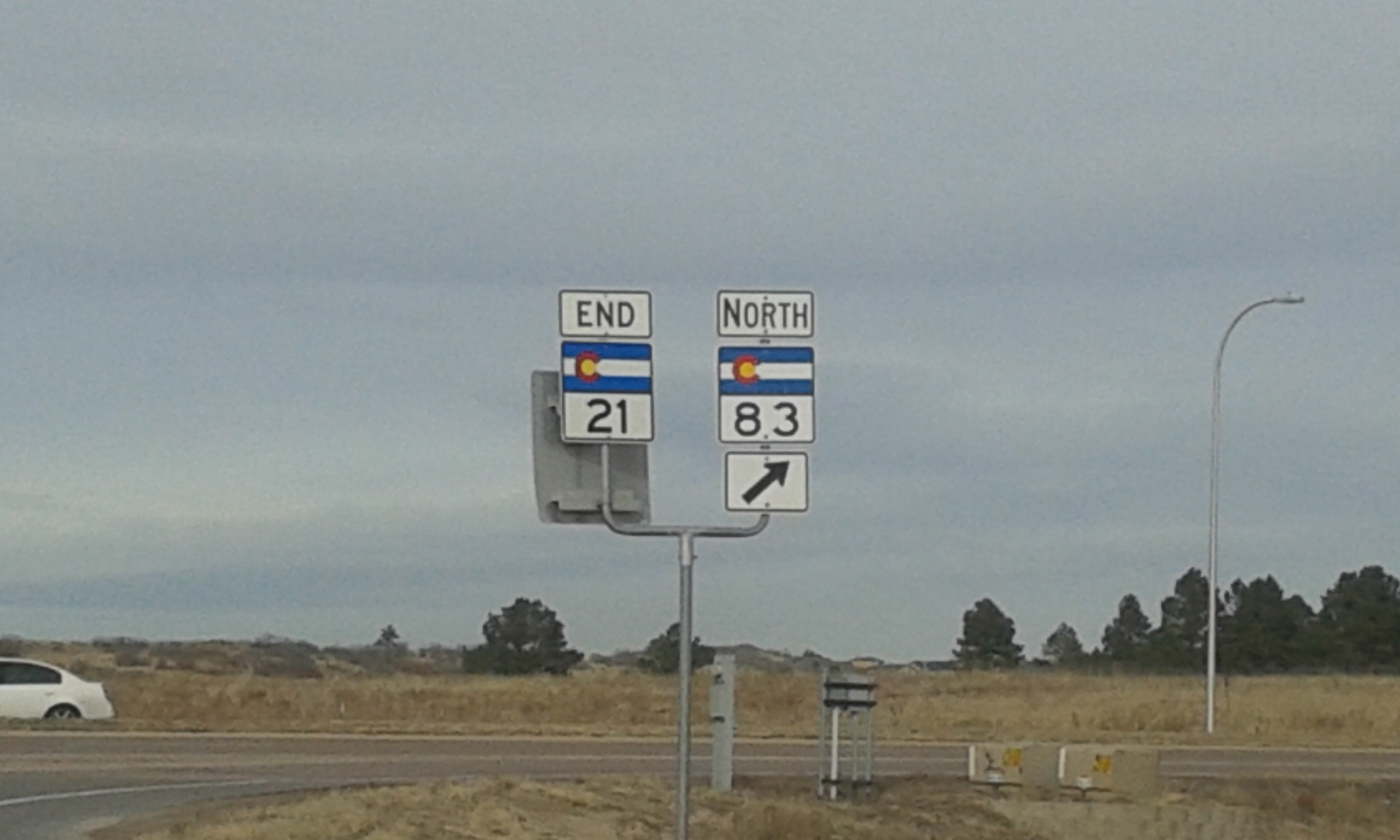
End of SH 21 at SH 83 in Colorado Springs

SH 21 begins at an intersection with SH 16, also known as Mesa Ridge Parkway in Security-Widefield, as a continuation of SH 16 and heads north. It then turns to the west and then turns back north as it bypasses the Colorado Springs Airport. It then continues north through eastern Colorado Springs as an expressway with a 55 mph speed limit. At the intersection with Fountain Boulevard, the route then runs concurrent with US 24 until reaching a partial cloverleaf interchange at Platte Avenue, where US 24 splits from SH 21 and heads east. SH 21 remains as an expressway going north through a densely populated area of Colorado Springs. After the intersection with Dublin Boulevard, it becomes a semi-freeway with a 65 mph speed limit until reaching its northern terminus at SH 83's southern terminus. The route's mileposts are lined up with the mileposts on I-25 and rather than starting at 0, it begins at mile 132 at its southern terminus.

The northern section, from Interquest Parkway/SH 83 to Dublin Boulevard is constructed to interstate highway standards with sufficient right-of-way to construct planned overpasses and on/off-ramps. CDOT completed interchanges and bridges at Union Boulevard and Briargate Parkway in 2013, an interchange at Old Ranch Road in 2015, and a diverging diamond interchange at Research Parkway in 2022. Future interchanges at SH 83 and Voyager Parkway are in progress. The whole route from I-25 to Milton E. Proby Parkway is planned as a controlled-access freeway.

== History ==
In 1964, the City of Colorado Springs included the "Powers Corridor" in its major thoroughfare plan as a bypass of the city two miles east of Academy Boulevard, and, in the 1970s, Colorado Springs and El Paso County recommended that Powers Boulevard be constructed "at least to expressway standards" and proposed it to be included in the Interstate Highway System.

=== Thoroughfare development ===
As interest in development near Powers Boulevard grew over the 1980s, developers formed a metropolitan district to fund an expansion of the road from Platte Avenue to Woodmen Road by issuing bonds.

Planning and construction of Powers Boulevard continued through the 1990s. The segment between Fountain Boulevard and Platte Avenue was included in the Colorado Springs US 24 bypass and reconstructed as an expressway; the city additionally extended the road south from Fountain Boulevard to Fontaine Boulevard. The Powers corridor was included in the National Highway System, and studies were prepared to extend the road to I-25 north and south of Colorado Springs. In June 1999, the City of Colorado Springs, El Paso County, and CDOT completed an agreement for a phased transfer of ownership for Powers Boulevard. According to the plan, over the following years, CDOT would assume ownership of Powers Boulevard with the intent to develop it as a limited-access freeway, and, in exchange, the city would assume ownership of several CDOT-owned roads, including the I-25 Business Loop along Nevada Avenue and SH 83 north of US 24; at this time, Powers Boulevard was planned to be the new path of SH 83 through Colorado Springs. In March 2000, the Colorado Transportation Commission adopted a resolution designating the future Powers Boulevard between I-25 and Woodmen Road as a freeway.

The first interchange along Powers Bouelvard, a partial cloverleaf at Platte Avenue, was finished in 2001. The southern end was extended to Mesa Ridge Parkway this year, as well. Between 2001 and 2005, Powers Boulevard was extended north from Woodmen Road to SH 83 as an at-grade expressway, with right-of-way preserved for future interchanges.

In late 2019, CDOT finished designs for a diverging diamond interchange between SH 21 and Research Parkway in northern Colorado Springs. The State Transportation Commission approved funding for construction, initially scheduled to begin in summer 2020. In spring 2020, CDOT included the interchange in the first phase of projects of their ten-year vision. Funding for the project was cancelled due to the COVID-19 pandemic, but funding was later secured and construction on the interchange began in June 2021. The project was estimated to cost $42 million. On September 14, 2022, the interchange was fully opened, although paving efforts continued until the project was officially finished in November 2022.

=== State highway ===
The agreement to exchange ownership of Powers Boulevard was updated in 2007, and the road was adopted into the state highway system as State Highway 21; transfers of ownership to CDOT were complete in 2008. Powers Boulevard's second interchange, at Woodmen Road, was also completed this year. In 2009, CDOT finished an environmental assessment of the central Powers Boulevard corridor from Woodmen Road to Mesa Ridge Parkway, setting the layout for a freeway between Woodmen Road and Milton E. Proby Parkway, as well as recommending preserving of right-of-way for a future freeway south to Mesa Ridge Parkway. By this time, SH 21 was no longer considered a bypass of Colorado Springs, but a major route through it.

Through the 2010s, CDOT advanced projects to grade-separate intersections on SH 21 north of Woodmen Road. In 2012, CDOT completed a split diamond interchange at Briargate Parkway and Union Boulevard, and an overpass was built at Old Ranch Road to form a diamond interchange in 2015. Preliminary plans were developed to construct an interchange at Research Parkway, the last at-grade intersection between Dublin Boulevard and the northern terminus of Powers, but they were put on hold in late 2018 after voters rejected two ballot measures proposing funding for state transportation projects.

The Copper Ridge Metropolitan District was formed in 2010 to fund the extension of Powers Boulevard from SH 83 to I-25 through tax increment financing from the Polaris Pointe development, located near the planned I-25/Powers Boulevard interchange. Construction on the first phase of the extension began in 2019 and was scheduled to complete in spring 2020. After failing that schedule due to the COVID-19 pandemic, it was scheduled to complete in summer 2021. The interchange was completed on October 7, 2021 with temporary signs for Voyager Parkway on I-25.

== Future ==
Construction of the northern extension of SH 21 to I-25 is underway, led by the Copper Ridge Metropolitan District; the project includes the segment from I-25 to Voyager Parkway. Construction of the first phase was completed in October 2021. The second phase, to connect Powers Boulevard between Voyager Parkway and SH 83, was approved by the PPRTA Board of Directors and Colorado Springs City Council in August 2023, and the El Paso County Board of Commissioners in September 2023. Through the agreement, the Copper Ridge Metropolitan District will finance the project and be reimbursed by the city and county from 2025 through 2034, allowing the project to be completed years ahead of its original schedule.

The 2010 central Powers Boulevard studies proposed the interchange between SH 21 and Airport Road/Stewart Avenue as a priority project due to congestion at the intersection and its use as the main entrance to Peterson Air Force Base. In 2014, CDOT identified a diverging diamond as the preferred interchange type, and, in 2020, they included the project in their ten-year vision plan, anticipated for the second half of the decade.

In January 2021, plans were discussed for five more overpasses on the existing portions of SH 21. This includes the diverging diamond interchange at Research Parkway which was opened to traffic in September 2022. The other overpasses would include the interchanges at Dublin Boulevard, Stetson Hills Boulevard, and Barnes Road. This plan has not yet been approved or funded.

In June 2024, construction began for upgrading the Airport Road intersection into a diverging diamond interchange. It is expected to finish by 2026.

== Junction list ==
The entire route is in El Paso County.

Location	mi (Note: Mileposts are offset by 131)	km	Exit	Destinations	Notes
Fountain	131.813	212.132		SH 16 west (Mesa Ridge Parkway) – Fountain	Southern terminus; road continues west as SH 16
Colorado Springs	139.582 308.230	224.635 496.048		US 24 west (Fountain Boulevard) – Manitou Springs	South end of US 24 overlap; mileposts change to reflect US 24 mileage
Colorado Springs	309.880	498.704	140	Airport Road	Diverging diamond interchange
Colorado Springs	310.878 141.738	500.310 228.105	141	US 24 east (Platte Avenue) – Limon	Partial cloverleaf interchange; north end of US 24 overlap; mileposts change to reflect SH 21 mileage
Colorado Springs	147.738	237.761		Dublin Boulevard	At-grade intersection; south end of freeway
Colorado Springs	148.700	239.309	149	Woodmen Road	Signed as exits 149A (east) and 149B (west) northbound
Colorado Springs	150.000	241.402	150	Research Parkway	Diverging diamond interchange
Colorado Springs	150.900	242.850	151	Briargate Parkway / Union Boulevard	Union Blvd. and Briargate Pkwy. are connected by Powers Blvd. Service Road
Colorado Springs	152.460	245.361	153	Old Ranch Road	Diamond interchange
Colorado Springs	154.112	248.019	154	SH 83 north (Interquest Parkway) – Parker	Temporary at-grade section; northbound traffic must exit; future interchange
Colorado Springs	Gap in route; SH 21 is not signed from then on				
Colorado Springs			—	Voyager Parkway	Partially completed diamond interchange; southbound exit and northbound exit
Colorado Springs			—	I-25 south (US 85 / US 87 south)	Northbound exit and southbound entrance; temporarily signed for Voyager Pkwy. along I-25
Colorado Springs			—	North Gate Boulevard	Northbound exit and southbound entrance
Colorado Springs				I-25 north (US 85 / US 87 north)	Northern terminus; temporarily signed for Voyager Pkwy. along I-25
1.000 mi = 1.609 km; 1.000 km = 0.621 mi: Concurrency terminus; Incomplete access; Route transition
