= Colorado State Highway 44 =

State highway in Colorado, United States

State Highway 44
- 104th Avenue
- SH 44 highlighted in red

Route information
- Maintained by CDOT
- Length: 4.958 mi (7.979 km)

Major junctions
- West end: Colorado Boulevard in Thornton
- US 85 in Commerce City
- East end: SH 2 in Commerce City

Location
- Country: United States
- State: Colorado
- Counties: Adams

Highway system
- Colorado State Highway System; Interstate; US; State; Scenic
← SH 42	→ SH 45

State Highway 44 (SH 44) is a 4.958 mi (8.0 km) long state highway in the U.S. state of Colorado. The western terminus is at Colorado Boulevard in Thornton, and the eastern terminus at SH 2 in Commerce City.

== Route description ==
SH 44 travels 5.0 miles (8.0 km) along 104h Avenue. It begins in Thornton at the intersection of Colorado Boulevard and runs due east. It then intersects US 85 in Commerce City and then reaches its eastern terminus at the junction with SH 2.

== Major intersections ==
The entire route is in Adams County.

Location	mi	km	Destinations	Notes
Thornton	4.958	7.979	Colorado Boulevard	Western terminus; 104th Avenue continues west
Commerce City	1.800	2.897	US 85 (CanAm Highway)	
Commerce City	0.000	0.000	SH 2	Eastern terminus; 104th Avenue continues east
1.000 mi = 1.609 km; 1.000 km = 0.621 mi

== See also ==
- List of state highways in Colorado
