= Colorado State Highway 35 =

State highway in Denver, Colorado, United States

State Highway 35
- Quebec Street
- SH 35 highlighted in red

Route information
- Maintained by CDOT
- Length: 1.315 mi (2.116 km)
- Existed: 1972–present

Major junctions
- South end: I-70 in Denver
- I-270 / US 36 in Denver
- North end: 53rd Place in Denver

Location
- Country: United States
- State: Colorado
- Counties: Denver

Highway system
- Colorado State Highway System; Interstate; US; State; Scenic
← US 34	→ US 36

State Highway 35 (SH 35) is an unsigned, (Note: While the highway itself is unsigned, there are SH 35 shields on the exit advance guide and interchange direction signs for the interchange for Quebec Street on both directions of Interstate 70, but not the corresponding signs on Interstate 270.) 1.317-mile (2.120 km) state highway that runs along Quebec Street located in Denver, Colorado, United States. Its southern end is at Interstate 70 (I‑70) and it runs north until it reaches its northern end at 53rd Place. The route was added to the state highway system in 1972 to provide access to Stapleton International Airport from I-70. After the decommissioning of Stapleton Airport, the highway has been truncated from Martin Luther King Jr. Boulevard to I-70. An expansion was planned but funding was never materialized.

== Route description ==
SH 35 begins at I‑70 and runs north along Quebec Street. North of I‑70, the route becomes Northfield Bouldevard/Quebec Street. It crosses Sand Creek and interchanges with Interstate 270. After I-270, it goes through a diamond interchange where Northfield Boulevard splits from Quebec Street and the route is only signed as Quebec Street from then on. SH 35 then continues north and ends at 53rd Place while Quebec Street continues northward towards Commerce City.

== History ==
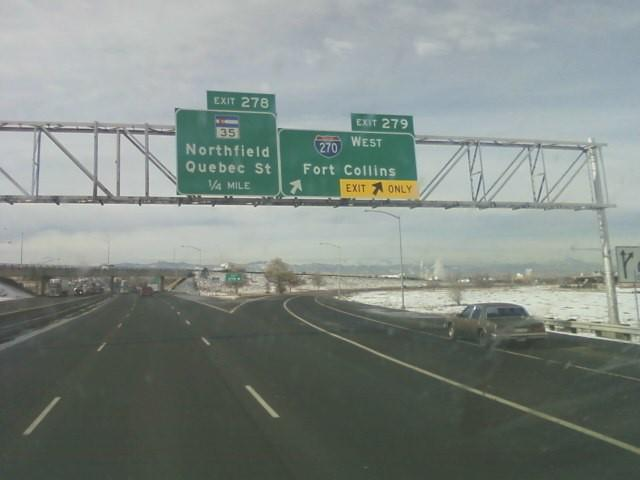
A SH 35 shield on the exit advance guide sign for the Northfield/Quebec Street interchange on westbound Interstate 70

The route was established in 1972 as a road to Stapleton International Airport (now closed). It was planned to be extended in several locations, but it remains as a short highway. Future plans from the 1970s indicate that the route would have run all the way from the intersection of Quebec Street and Hampden Avenue north to Interstate 80 South (now I‑76), southwest of Barr Lake, but construction never began, even though the project was still listed in transportation plans until the late 1990s.

The route's southern end was at the Stapleton terminal access road from 1972 until 2000, when it was moved up to I‑70. The northern end of the highway moved up to 53rd Place between 1995 and 1996, before the Stapleton redevelopment started in 2000.

== Exit list ==
The entire route is in Denver. All exits are unnumbered.

mi (Note: Mileposts are based on the proposed routing of SH 35 from Hampden Avenue to I-76 but never purged after plans were abandoned.)	km	Destinations	Notes
8.435	13.575	I-70 – Limon	Southern terminus; I-70 exit 278, road continues south as Quebec Street
8.890	14.307	I-270 (Dwight D. Eisenhower Highway) / US 36 to I-76 / I-25 – Westminster, Boulder	I-270 exit 4; Westbound I-270 access only; north and southbound Quebec Street access via Northfield Boulevard exit
9.070	14.597	Northfield Boulevard	Diamond interchange
9.704	15.617	53rd Place	Northern terminus; road continues north as Quebec Street
1.000 mi = 1.609 km; 1.000 km = 0.621 mi: Incomplete access

== See also ==
- List of state highways in Colorado
