= U.S. Route 85 in Colorado =

Highway in Colorado

U.S. Highway 85
- CanAm Highway
- US 85 highlighted in red

Route information
- Maintained by CDOT
- Length: 309.54 mi (498.16 km)

Major junctions
- South end: I-25 / US 85 / US 87 at the New Mexico state line near Raton, NM
- US 160 from Trinidad to Walsenburg; US 50 in Pueblo; US 24 in Colorado Springs; US 285 in Englewood; US 6 in Denver; US 40 / US 287 in Denver; I-70 in Denver; I-270 / US 36 in Commerce City; I-76 / US 6 near Derby; US 34 in Evans
- North end: US 85 at the Wyoming state line near Cheyenne, WY

Location
- Country: United States
- State: Colorado
- Counties: Las Animas, Huerfano, Pueblo, El Paso, Douglas, Arapahoe, Denver, Adams, Weld

Highway system
- United States Numbered Highway System; List; Special; Divided; Colorado State Highway System; Interstate; US; State; Scenic
← US 84	→ SH 86

U.S. Route 85 (US 85) is a part of the U.S. Highway System that travels from the Mexican border in El Paso, Texas, north to the Canadian border in Fortuna, North Dakota. In the state of Colorado, US 85 enters at the New Mexico state line south of Starkville and leaves at the Wyoming state line south of Cheyenne. US 85 is concurrent with interstate routes for the more than half of its stretch in Colorado, mostly with Interstate 25, which it shares over 179 miles of roadway with. It also shares concurrencies with Interstate 70, Interstate 76, and US Route 6. US 85 is part of the CanAm Highway, an unofficial section of the Pan American Highway, for its entirety in Colorado.

== Route description ==
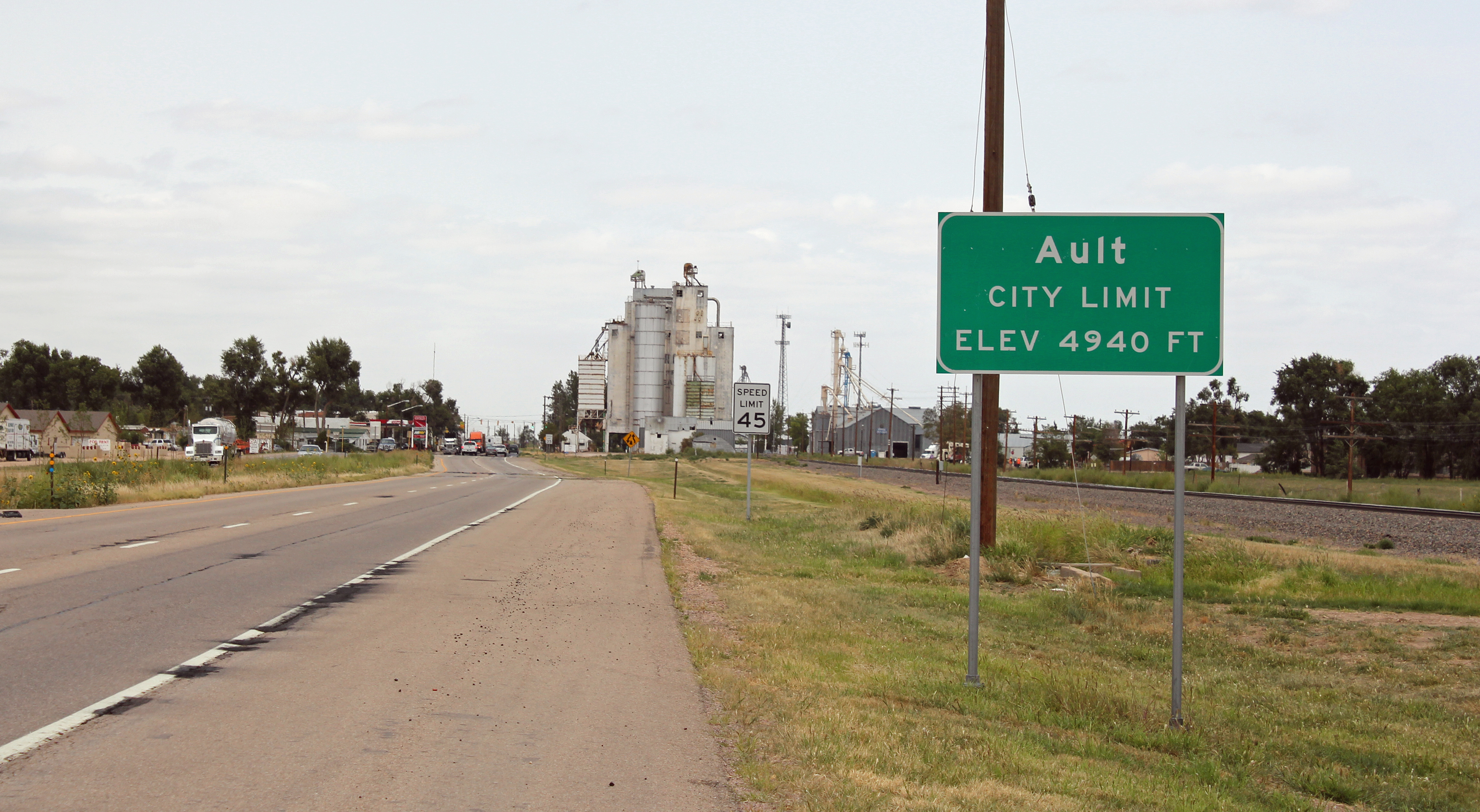
US 85 looking north entering Ault

=== New Mexico state line to Douglas County ===
US 85 enters Colorado in Las Animas County at the summit of the Raton Pass concurrent and unsigned with I-25 and US 87. It follows the Santa Fe Trail and the Raton Creek for the next few miles as it descends down the mountains into Trinidad. In Trinidad, US 85 passes downtown to the west, and soon junctions with US 160, which it joins westbound. US 160 also provides connection to US 350 towards La Junta and US 50. It then turns northwest along the eastern face of the Rocky Mountains and into Heurfano County. In Walsenburg, US 85 then meets the I-25 Business Loop at exit 49, and US 160 exits, continuing west towards the San Luis Valley, Alamosa, and the Great Sand Dunes National Park. The roadway continues north into Pueblo County, now commemorated as the John F. Kennedy Memorial Highway, passing Colorado City and SH 165 and continuing towards Pueblo.

US 85 enters Pueblo at exit 94 for SH 45 and Pueblo Boulevard. From there, the roadway tightens and descends in elevation with tighter curves and a speed limit of 55 mph (89 km/h). The road then crosses the Arkansas River and passes downtown to the east before again climbing in elevation. It soon junctions with US 50, which joins it north for around a mile and a half before exiting and continuing west toward Cañon City. The southern interchange with US 50 is currently undergoing a redesign which will convert this interchange to a diverging diamond. The roadway parallels the Union Pacific Railroad line northbound leaving Pueblo and passing the edge of Pueblo West before entering El Paso County. Now commemorated as the Ronald Regan Highway, the roadway continues north along the Fountain Creek and Fort Caron, past the Pikes Peak International Speedway, and into Fountain.

In exit 128, US 85 exits I-25 and passes Fountain through downtown as a two-lane road named Santa Fe Drive. Once it leaves downtown, the road is signed as US Highway 85-87, though US 87 is no longer signed along this road and is instead concurrent with I-25 for its entirety in Colorado. US 85 continues north, expanding to four lanes near the junction with SH 16, allowing access to Fort Carson and SH 21 towards the Colorado Springs Airport and the eastern edge of Colorado Springs. US 85 continues through the communities of Security-Widefield and Stratmoor before meeting Academy Boulevard, allowing access to the Colorado Springs Airport, Fort Carson, and Pikes Peak State College. The roadway reduces to two lanes and crosses over I-25 again before an intersection with Venetucci Boulevard and B Street. US 85 officially transfers onto the Interstate at this overpass, though there is no direct access back onto the Interstate, making it an inaccessible transfer. Drivers can access US 85 again by continuing on Venetucci Boulevard to Lake Avenue and turning right towards the Interstate.

Again concurrent with I-25, US 85 enters Colorado Springs at Lake Avenue. The roadway expands to six lanes at Lake Avenue, marking the first time US 85 has had more than four consistent drive lanes since leaving Albuquerque. It soon turns west and meets US 24, which joins it westbound for a little over two miles (3.2 km) before exiting as US 85 skirts around downtown Colorado Springs to the west. It turns northbound again as a six-lane freeway through the city. As it leaves the city limits past Woodmen Road, it turn northeast to avoid the United States Air Force Academy, which it follows to the east. It continues north through the Colorado Springs suburbs and into the Tri-Lake area of Monument, Woodmoor, and Palmer Lake before entering Douglas County past Monument Hill and continues north towards Castle Rock.

=== Douglas County to Denver Metro ===
US 85, still concurrent with I-25/US 87, enters Douglas County as a six-lane freeway. Shortly afterwards it encounters the Greenland Wildlife Overpass, the largest wildlife crossing over a freeway in North America spanning over an acre in size, completed in 2025. The roadway soon reduces to four lanes but is assisted by express lanes in both directions. CDOT opened the express lanes in 2022 and they eliminated the final stretch of four lane I-25 between Colorado Springs and Denver. The highway passes Larkspur to the east, home to the Colorado Renaissance Festival and continues north. The express lanes end in Castle Rock and give way to general purpose lanes as they pass through the city, evading downtown to the west.

At exit 184, US 85 exits I-25 again at Meadows Parkway and SH 86 near the Castle Rock Outlets, turning west shortly before continuing northwest towards Castle Pines Village. US 85 continues as a two-lane road until its junction with SH 67 in Sedalia, where it expands to a four-lane expressway. The roadway turns more north as it passes Louviers and Sterling Ranch before it enters Highlands Ranch.

In Highlands Ranch, the roadway turns north and expands to six lanes near the Chatfield Reservoir. It soon junctions with SH 470, the southwestern portion of the outer beltway around Denver. Now signed as Santa Fe Drive and commemorated as the Navy SEAL Danny Dietz Memorial Highway, US 85 enters Arapahoe County and the City of Littleton. US 85 parallels RTD's C-Line light rail for its stretch back to I-25. The roadway turns north to avoid downtown Littleton to the west before turning northeast again and junction SH 88 at Bellview Avenue. Shortly after, the road enters Englewood for a short distance before entering Sheridan. At the city limits of Sheridan and Englewood, US 85 meets its spur route US 285 at Hampden Avenue at a partial cloverleaf interchange, and it continues north in Englewood. US 85 enters the City and County of Denver at an RTD light rail maintenance depot near Yale Avenue. The roadway continues north and splits at the South Platte River, where northbound and southbound traffic are on differing sides of the river. Once it passes Vanderbilt Park, US 85 meets I-25 again, and northbound traffic passes over the Interstate before merging into it at mile marker 208. Santa Fe Drive continues north underneath the Interstate without concurrency with US 85, and drivers can access SH 26 and Broadway for local traffic into the city. The area around this intersection, known as the Santa Fe Yards, is the site of the future stadium for Denver Summit FC of the NWSL.

Once again concurrent with I-25, US 85 enters the downtown area near a stretch of junctions with major downtown roads and freeways. First, it meets US 6 at aninterchange where US 6 joins it northbound and runs concurrently with US 85 for the next 18 miles (29 km). The roadway then junctions with Colfax Avenue, a major east west roadway which carries the I-70 Business Loop and US 40/US 287, allowing access to Empower Field at Mile High Stadium and the state capitol building. Auraria Parkway is also in this exit junction, which gives access to Ball Arena and Metropolitan State University of Denver. The road then crosses the South Platte River and turns northeast. The freeway is sunken below the street grid of the Highlands neighborhood between Speer Boulevard and 20th Street, with various vehicle and pedestrian bridges overhead. At exit 214A, US 6/US 85 exits I-25 for the final time on its way to I-70, which it joins eastbound at an interchange locally known as "The Mousetrap". US 6/US 85 runs concurrently with I-70 for only two miles (3.2 km) before exiting at Vasquez Boulevard and turning north through the city.

US 6/US 85 leaves Denver and enters Adams County and Commerce City at a flyover intersection with SH 2, which joins northbound. Shortly after, the roadway junctions with I-270 and the unsigned US 36 at a cloverleaf interchange. There is no ramp onto I-270 eastbound from US 6/US 85 northbound, and drivers must instead enter I-270 west and take the loops onto eastbound I-270 or U-turn and approach from the south. This interchange is planned to be redesigned with the ongoing I-270 rebuild as it is a major bottleneck for commuting traffic in the area. US 6/US 85 turns north, and SH 2 departs at another flyover interchange continuing northeast. US 6/US 85 turns northeast and junctions with SH 265 and SH 244 in quick succession before merging onto I-76 at a flyover interchange at exit 9. The highways run concurrently for nearly three miles (4.8 km) before US 85 exits I-76 at a left exit onto its own road, leaving US 6 concurrent with the Interstate. US 85 is not concurrent with any other Interstates for the remainder of its time in Colorado. US 85, now a four-lane divided expressway, and soon junctions with SH 44 and SH 22 before meeting E-470, the western portion of the aforementioned beltway around Denver, before continuing northeast towards Brighton.

=== Weld County and Northern Colorado ===
US 85 northbound at US 34 and US 85 Bus. in Evans

US 85 enters the city of Brighton, the seat of Adams County, as it leaves the Denver metro, continuing north and passing the city to the west, junctioning SH 7 in downtown. It enters Weld County outside of Brighton and soon enters Fort Lupton, junctioning with SH 52 and the US 85 Business (US 85 Bus.), one of the three business loops for US 85 in Colorado, all in Weld County. Once out of Fort Lupton, it continues north and meets its second business loop in Platteville, as well as SH 66. The roadway turns northeast through the towns of Gilcrest, Peckham, and La Salle before entering Evans.

In Evans, US 85 meets US 34 at a large and complex interchange full of left exits and loop ramps. US 85 exits to the right and US 85 Bus., the final in Colorado, continues straight towards downtown Greeley and the University of Northern Colorado. Due to the complexity of the interchange, US 34 and US 85 run concurrently for less than a quarter mile before US 85 exits to the left. The city limits for Evans and Greeley sit in the middle of this interchange, so US 85 continues north now in Greeley. Passing on the east side of the city, it meets the US 34 Bus. before merging back onto the US 85 Business and continuing north.

The roadway continues north junctioning with SH 392 in Lucerne, passing through Eaton, and junctioning with SH 14 in Ault before continuing north through the rural areas of Weld County and entering Wyoming en route to Cheyenne.

For its entirety in Weld County, US 85 parallels I-25 to the east, serving as the major north–south connector for the communities of that area and diverting their traffic off I-25. Every state highway it junctions leads west back to I-25 towards the more populated regions of Larimer and Boulder counties, as well as more populous regions of Weld County.

== History ==
US 85 originally followed some of the route that I-25 would later take. In southern Colorado, US 85 originally was placed on city streets in Colorado Springs, Pueblo, and Trinidad until 1938 where the route was ultimately paved from one state to another, taking place at the present I-25 corridor. In Denver, US 85 followed Santa Fe Drive north to Iowa Avenue, three miles (4.8 km) south of downtown, then jogged east to Broadway, continuing about 4.5 miles (7.2 km) north to turn northeast onto Brighton Boulevard.

=== Realignment ===
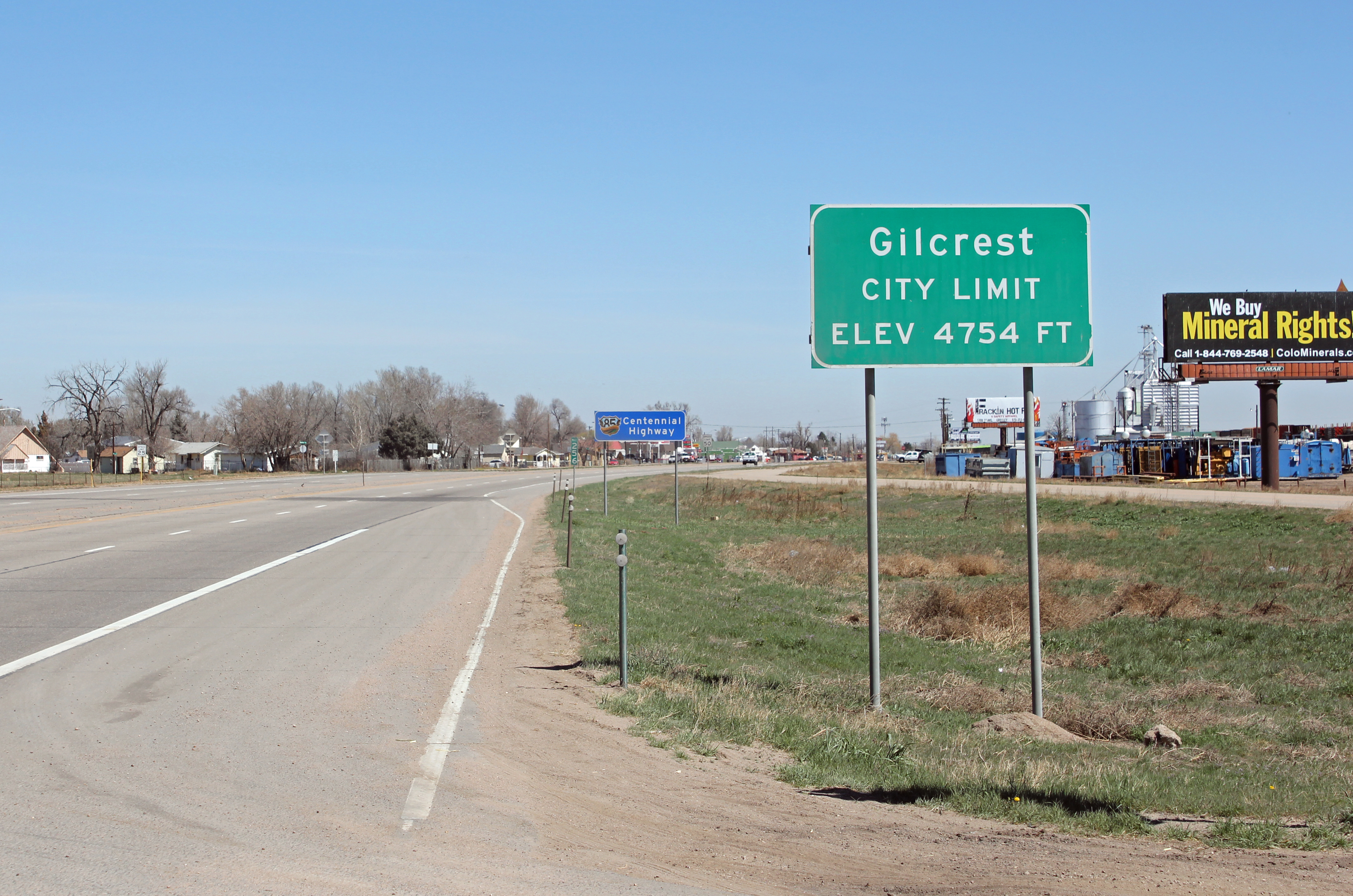
US 85 looking north entering Gilcrest

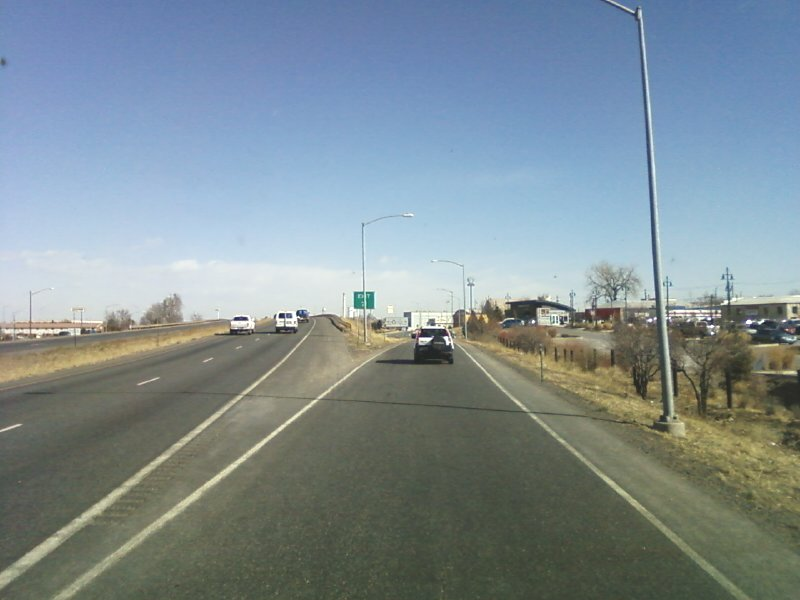
US 85 looking north at the exit ramp for SH 7 (Bridge Street) in Brighton

Starting in 1942, a realignment project took place in northeastern Denver, involving the opening of Vasquez Boulevard. Originally, US 85 ran along Brighton Boulevard from downtown going northeast and then was realigned along 46th Avenue to Vasquez Bouleard. Five years later, in Pueblo, the route took the downtown streets before the Greenhorn/Crow bypass opened two years later. In 1950, the Palmer Lake/Larkspur bypass opened, moving US 85 along with US 87 along the expressway. The expressway opened north of Pueblo in 1951, which allowed both US 85 and US 87 to use the expressway coming out of downtown until 1954.

In 1958, when the Valley Highway (now I-25) opened in Denver, US 85 no longer followed Broadway. It followed Santa Fe Drive north to Alameda, then transitioned onto I-25 until 46th Avenue, where it turned east toward Vasquez. When I-70 was connected to I-25 in 1964, it became US 85 between I-25 and Vasquez.

On October 1, 2007, part of the US 85 known as Nevada Avenue was relinquished and is now maintained by the City of Colorado Springs.

== Junction list ==
County	Location	mi	km	Exit	Destinations	Notes
Las Animas		0.00	0.00		I-25 south / US 85 / US 87	Continuation into New Mexico
Las Animas		2.13	3.43	2	Wootton	
Las Animas		5.60	9.01	6	Gallinas	
Las Animas		7.53	12.12	8	Spring Creek	
Las Animas	Trinidad	11.01	17.72	11	Starkville	
Las Animas	Trinidad	13	21	13A	Van Buren Street	Northbound exit and southbound entrance
Las Animas	Trinidad	13.31	21.42	13B	SH 12 west (Main Street)	Eastern terminus of SH 12
Las Animas	Trinidad	13.96	22.47	14	Commercial Street	
Las Animas	Trinidad	14.88	23.95	15	US 160 east (Kit Carson Trail) / SH 239 north to US 350 / Goddard Avenue – La Junta	Southern end of US 160 concurrency
Las Animas		17.73	28.53	18	El Moro Road	
Las Animas		23	37	23	Hoehne Road	
Las Animas		26.86	43.23	27	Ludlow	
Las Animas		30.46	49.02	30	Aguilar Road	
Las Animas	Lynn	34.15	54.96	34	I-25 BS – Aguilar	
Huerfano		40.49	65.16	41	Rugby Road	
Huerfano		41.93	67.48	42	Rouse Road	
Huerfano	Walsenburg	49	79	49	I-25 BL north / US 160 west – Walsenburg, Alamosa	Northern end of US 160 concurrency
Huerfano	Walsenburg	50.05	80.55	50	SH 10 east – La Junta	Western terminus of SH 10
Huerfano	Walsenburg	52.32	84.20	52	I-25 BL south to US 160 west / SH 69 north – Walsenburg	
Huerfano		54.95	88.43	55	Airport Road	
Huerfano		56.22	90.48	56	Redrock Road	
Huerfano		58.73	94.52	59	Butte Road	
Huerfano		60.08	96.69	60	Huerfano	
Huerfano		64	103	64	Lascar Road	
Huerfano		66.75	107.42	67	Apache	
Pueblo		71.26	114.68	71	Graneros Road	
Pueblo	Colorado City	74.37	119.69	74	SH 165 west – Colorado City, Rye, San Isabel	Eastern terminus of SH 165
Pueblo		77.27	124.35	77	Abbey Road, Hatchet Ranch Road	
Pueblo		83.46	134.32	83	Brantzell	
Pueblo		86.94	139.92	87	Verde Road	
Pueblo		87.92	141.49	88	Burnt Mill Road	
Pueblo		90.63	145.85	91	Stem Beach	
Pueblo	Pueblo	94.77	152.52	94	SH 45 north (Pueblo Boulevard)	
Pueblo	Pueblo	95.40	153.53	95	Illinois Avenue	Southbound entrance only
Pueblo	Pueblo	95.90	154.34	96	Minnequa Avenue, Illinois Avenue	Northbound entrance and exit from Indiana Avenue; southbound exit on Minnequa Avenue; southbound entrance on Aqua Avenue
Pueblo	Pueblo	96.67	155.58	97A	McCulley Avenue to Northern Avenue	
Pueblo	Pueblo	97.53	156.96	97B	Abriendo Avenue	
Pueblo	Pueblo	97.69	157.22	98A	US 50 Bus. (Santa Fe Avenue)	
Pueblo	Pueblo	98.55	158.60	98B	To SH 96 / City Center Drive	
Pueblo	Pueblo	98.81	159.02	99A	To SH 96 / 6th Street	Northbound entrance (from Bradford Street) and southbound exit only
Pueblo	Pueblo	99.39	159.95	99B	13th Street	
Pueblo	Pueblo	99.98	160.90	100A	US 50 east – La Junta	Southern end of US 50 concurrency
Pueblo	Pueblo	100.68	162.03	100B	29th Street	
Pueblo	Pueblo	101.39	163.17	101	US 50 west / SH 47 east – Cañon City	Northern end of US 50 concurrency; western terminus of SH 47
Pueblo	Pueblo	102.27	164.59	102	Eagleridge Boulevard	
Pueblo	Pueblo	103.51	166.58	104	Dillon Drive, Drew Dix Parkway	Northbound exits onto Dillon Drive, enters from Drew Dix Parkway; southbound exits onto Drew Dix Parkway and enters from Dillon Drive
Pueblo		106.08	170.72	106	Porter Draw	
Pueblo		108	174	108	Purcell Boulevard	To Pueblo West
Pueblo		110.29	177.49	110	Pinon	
Pueblo		113.94	183.37	114	Young Hollow	
Pueblo		115.83	186.41	116	County Line Road	
El Paso		118.84	191.25	119	Rancho Colorado Boulevard	
El Paso		121.46	195.47	122	Pikes Peak International Raceway	
El Paso		123.19	198.26	123	Hanna Road	Exit does not sign destination
El Paso		124.56	200.46	125	Ray Nixon Road	
El Paso	Fountain	127.86	205.77	128	I-25 north / US 87	Northern end of I-25/US 87 concurrency
El Paso	Fountain	131.56	211.73		SH 16 (Mesa Ridge Parkway) – Fort Carson	Interchange
El Paso	Stratmoor	135.46	218.00		Academy Boulevard	Interchange; former SH 83
El Paso	Stratmoor	136.96	220.42		I-25 south / US 87	Southern end of I-25 concurrency; no access back onto I-25; drivers can access using Venetucci Boulevard to Lake Avenue
El Paso	Colorado Springs	138.62	223.09	138	Lake Avenue, Circle Avenue	
El Paso	Colorado Springs	139.61	224.68	139	US 24 east (Martin Luther King Jr. Bypass) – Limon	Southern end of US 24 concurrency
El Paso	Colorado Springs	140.62	226.31	140	SH 115 south (Nevada Avenue, Tejon Street) – Cañon City	Northern terminus of SH 115; northbound exits onto Nevada Avenue and enters from Tejon Street, southbound exits onto Tejon Street and enters from Nevada Avenue
El Paso	Colorado Springs	142.01	228.54	141	US 24 west (Cimarron Street) – Manitou Springs	Northern end of US 24 concurrency
El Paso	Colorado Springs	142.72	229.69	142	Bijou Street	
El Paso	Colorado Springs	143.70	231.26	143	Uintah Street	
El Paso	Colorado Springs	144.39	232.37	144	Centennial Boulevard	Formerly Fontanero Street
El Paso	Colorado Springs	145.49	234.14	145	Fillmore Street	Diverging diamond interchange
El Paso	Colorado Springs	146.94	236.48	146	Garden of the Gods Road	
El Paso	Colorado Springs	148.12	238.38	148	Nevada Avenue, Corporate Drive, Rockrimmon Boulevard	Northbound exits onto Rockrimmon Boulevard and enters from Nevada Avenue, southbound exits onto Corporate Drive and enters from Rockrimmon Boulevard
El Paso	Colorado Springs	149.7	240.9	149	Woodmen Road	
El Paso		151.17	243.28	150	Academy Boulevard	Former SH 83; access to United States Air Force Academy's southern gate
El Paso		152.53	245.47	151	Briargate Parkway	
El Paso		154.07	247.95	153	Interquest Parkway	
El Paso	Colorado Springs	155	249	155	Voyager Parkway	Future terminus for SH 21
El Paso		156.80	252.35	156	Northgate Boulevard	Access to United States Air Force Academy's northern gate
El Paso		159.07	256.00	158	Baptist Road	
El Paso	Monument	161.63	260.12	161	SH 105 / 2nd Street – Monument, Palmer Lake	
El Paso–Douglas county line		164.19	264.24	163	County Line Road	
Douglas		168.33	270.90	167	Greenland	
Douglas		172.69	277.92	172	Upper Lake Gulch Road	
Douglas		173.17	278.69	173	Larkspur	Northbound entrance and southbound exit
Douglas		174.67	281.10	174	Tomah Road	
Douglas		180	290	179	Crystal Valley Parkway	Under construction; currently open for northbound entrance and exit only
Douglas	Castle Rock	181.75	292.50	181	Plum Creek Parkway	
Douglas	Castle Rock	182.72	294.06	182	Wilcox Street, Wolfensberger Road	
Douglas	Castle Rock	184.7	297.2	184	I-25 north (US 87 north) / SH 86 east (Founders Parkway) – Denver	Southern end of I-25/US 87 concurrency; western terminus of SH 86
Douglas	Castle Rock	186.3	299.8		N. Meadows Drive, Castle Rock Parkway	Interchange
Douglas	Sedalia	190.37	306.37		SH 67 south – Woodland Park	Northern terminus of SH 67
Douglas		196.19	315.74		Titan Parkway	Interchange
Douglas	Highlands Ranch	200.39	322.50		SH 470 – Grand Junction, Colorado Springs	SH 470 exit 17
Arapahoe	Littleton	204.76	329.53		SH 88 (Belleview Avenue)	Interchange
Arapahoe	Sheridan–Englewood line	206.79	332.80		US 285 (Hampden Avenue)	Interchange
City and County of Denver		208.7	335.9		Evans Avenue	Interchange
City and County of Denver		210.57	338.88	207B	I-25 south (US 87 south) / Santa Fe Drive north – Colorado Springs	Southern end of I-25/US 87 concurrency
City and County of Denver		211.19	339.88	208	SH 26 west (Alameda Avenue)	Eastern terminus of SH 26; northbound entrance and southbound exit only
City and County of Denver		212.42	341.86	209	US 6 west (6th Avenue) – Lakewood	Southern end of US 6 concurrency; signed as exits 209A (east) and 209B (west)
City and County of Denver		212.67	342.26	209C	8th Avenue	
City and County of Denver		213.5	343.6	210A	I-70 BL / US 40 / US 287 (Colfax Avenue)	
City and County of Denver		213.61	343.77	210B	Auraria Parkway	Northbound exit and southbound entrance only
City and County of Denver		213.75	344.00	210C	17th Avenue	Northbound entrance and exit only; southbound access via exit 211
City and County of Denver				211	23rd Avenue, 20th Avenue	20th Avenue signed southbound only
City and County of Denver		214.65	345.45	212	Speer Boulevard	Signed as exits 212A (south) and 212B (north)
City and County of Denver		215.29	346.48	212C	20th Street	
City and County of Denver		215.96	347.55	213	Park Avenue, 38th Avenue	
City and County of Denver		216.01	347.63	214A	I-70 west – Grand Junction	Northern end of I-25/US 87 concurrency; northbound exit and southbound entrance only
City and County of Denver		217.34	349.77	275A	Washington Street	
City and County of Denver		217.51	350.05	274	I-25 north / US 87 – Fort Collins	Western end of I-70 concurrency; westbound exit and eastbound entrance only
City and County of Denver		217.98	350.80	275B	SH 265 north (Brighton Boulevard); York Street	Southern terminus of SH 265; York Street signed eastbound only
City and County of Denver		218.81	352.14	276	I-70 east (Vasquez Boulevard) – Limon	Eastern end of I-70 concurrency; signed exit 276A eastbound
Adams	Commerce City	219.96	353.99		SH 2 south (Colorado Boulevard)	Southern end of SH 2 concurrency; northbound exit and southbound entrance only
Adams	Commerce City	220.53	354.91		I-270 / US 36 – Limon, Boulder	I-270 exit 2A-B; no ramp from US6/85 to I-270 east
Adams	Commerce City	221.06	355.76		SH 2 north	Northern end of SH 2 concurrency; northbound exit and southbound entrance only
Adams	Commerce City	222.05	357.35		SH 265 south (69th Avenue)	Northern terminus of SH 265
Adams	Commerce City	222.72	358.43		SH 224 west (74th Avenue) to I-76 west	Eastern terminus of SH 224
Adams		224.13	360.70	9	I-76 west – Denver	Western end of I-76 concurrency; northbound entrance and southbound exit only
Adams	Commerce City	224.90	361.94	10	88th Avenue	
Adams		225.98	363.68	11	96th Avenue	
Adams		226.8	365.0	12	I-76 east (US 6 east) – Fort Morgan	Northern end of I-76/US 6 concurrency; northbound exit and southbound entrance only
Adams	Commerce City	227.39	365.95		SH 44 (104th Avenue)	
Adams	Brighton	230.3	370.6		SH 22 (124th Avenue)	
Adams	Brighton	231.23	372.13		E-470 – Aurora	Interchange; E-470 exit 38; entrance ramp includes direct entrance from Brighton Road
Adams	Brighton	235.10	378.36		SH 7 west (Bridge Street) – Brighton, Boulder	Eastern terminus of SH 7
Weld	Fort Lupton	241.59	388.80		SH 52 to US 85 Bus. – Ft. Lupton	Interchange
Weld	Fort Lupton	242.66	390.52		US 85 Bus. south (14th Street)	
Weld	Platteville	249.22	401.08		US 85 Bus. north	
Weld	Platteville	250.65	403.38		SH 66 west (Justin Avenue) – Longmont	Eastern terminus of SH 66
Weld	Platteville	251.8	405.2		US 85 Bus. south	Southbound access only
Weld	Platteville	253.8	408.5		SH 60 west – Milliken	Eastern terminus of SH 60
Weld	Peckham	258.83	416.55		CR 44	Partial dumbbell interchange
Weld	Evans	265.38	427.09		US 85 Bus. north – Greeley, Loveland	Northbound left exit and southbound left entrance
Weld	Evans	265.62	427.47		US 34 west – Loveland	Southern end of US 34 concurrency
Weld	Greeley	265.85	427.84		US 34 east – Ft. Morgan	Northern end of US 34 concurrency; northbound left exit and southbound left entrance
Weld	Greeley	267.18	429.98		US 34 Bus. (18th Street)	
Weld		270.11	434.70		6th Avenue	Interchange; northbound exit and southbound entrance
Weld	Greeley	270.25	434.93		US 85 Bus. south – Greeley Business District	Southbound exit and northbound entrance; interchange
Weld	Lucerne	272.48	438.51		SH 392 – Windsor	
Weld	Ault	279.76	450.23		SH 14 (1st Street) – Fort Collins	
Weld		309.54	498.16		US 85 north – Cheyenne	Continuation into Wyoming
1.000 mi = 1.609 km; 1.000 km = 0.621 mi: Concurrency terminus; Electronic toll collection; Incomplete access; Unopened

== Related routes ==
US 85 has three current business routes in Colorado: one in Fort Lupton, one in Platteville, and one in Greeley.

== See also ==
U.S. Route 85
Previous state: New Mexico	Colorado	Next state: Wyoming
