= Pea Green Corner, Colorado =

Unincorporated community in Montrose County, CO, USA

- Unincorporated community
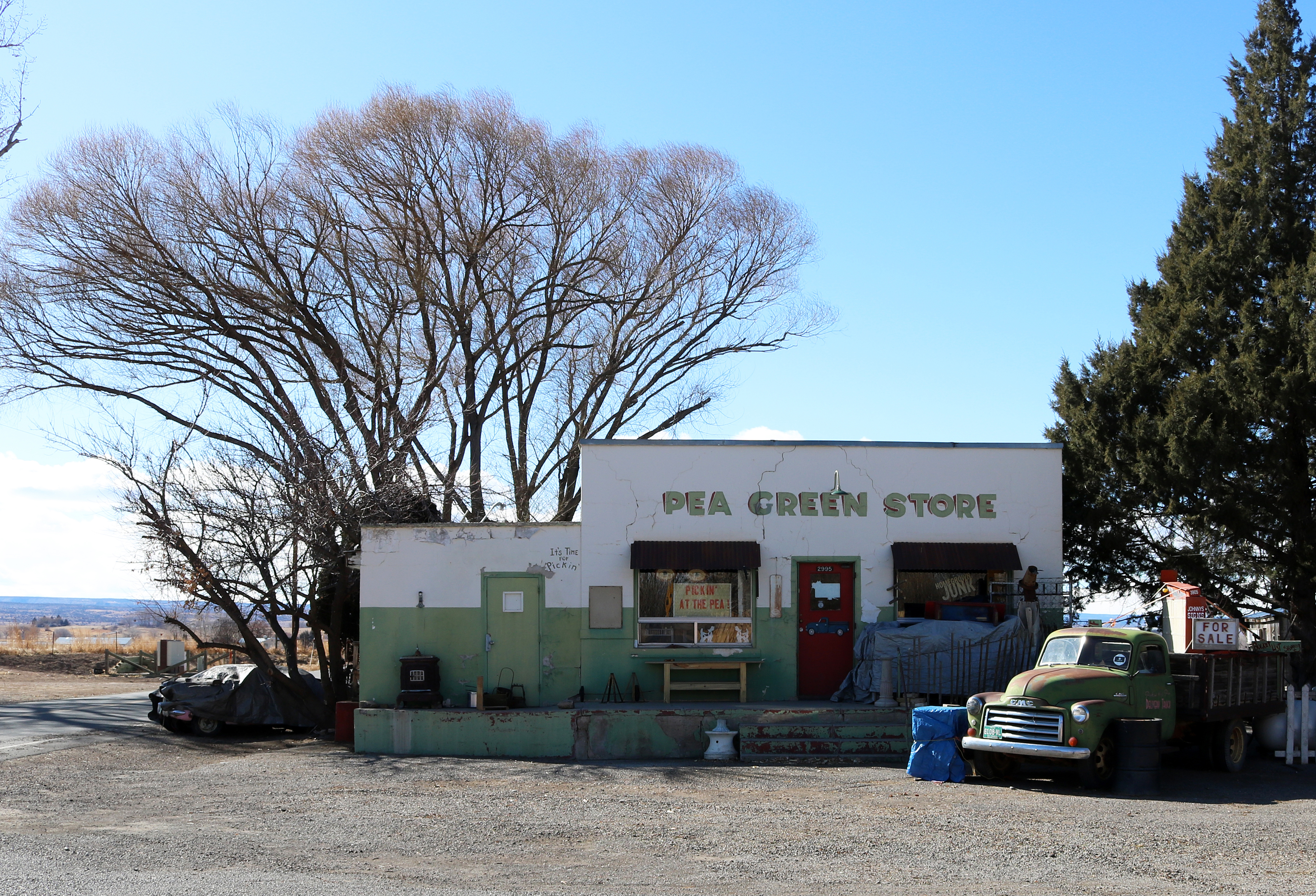
- The Pea Green Store

- Location within Colorado Location within the United States
- Coordinates: 38°39′00″N 108°05′42″W
- Country: United States
- State: Colorado
- County: Montrose
- Elevation: 5,309 ft (1,618 m)
- Time zone: UTC-7 (MST)
  - Summer (DST): UTC-6 (MDT)
- ZIP code: 81425
- Area code: 970
- GNIS feature ID: 185532

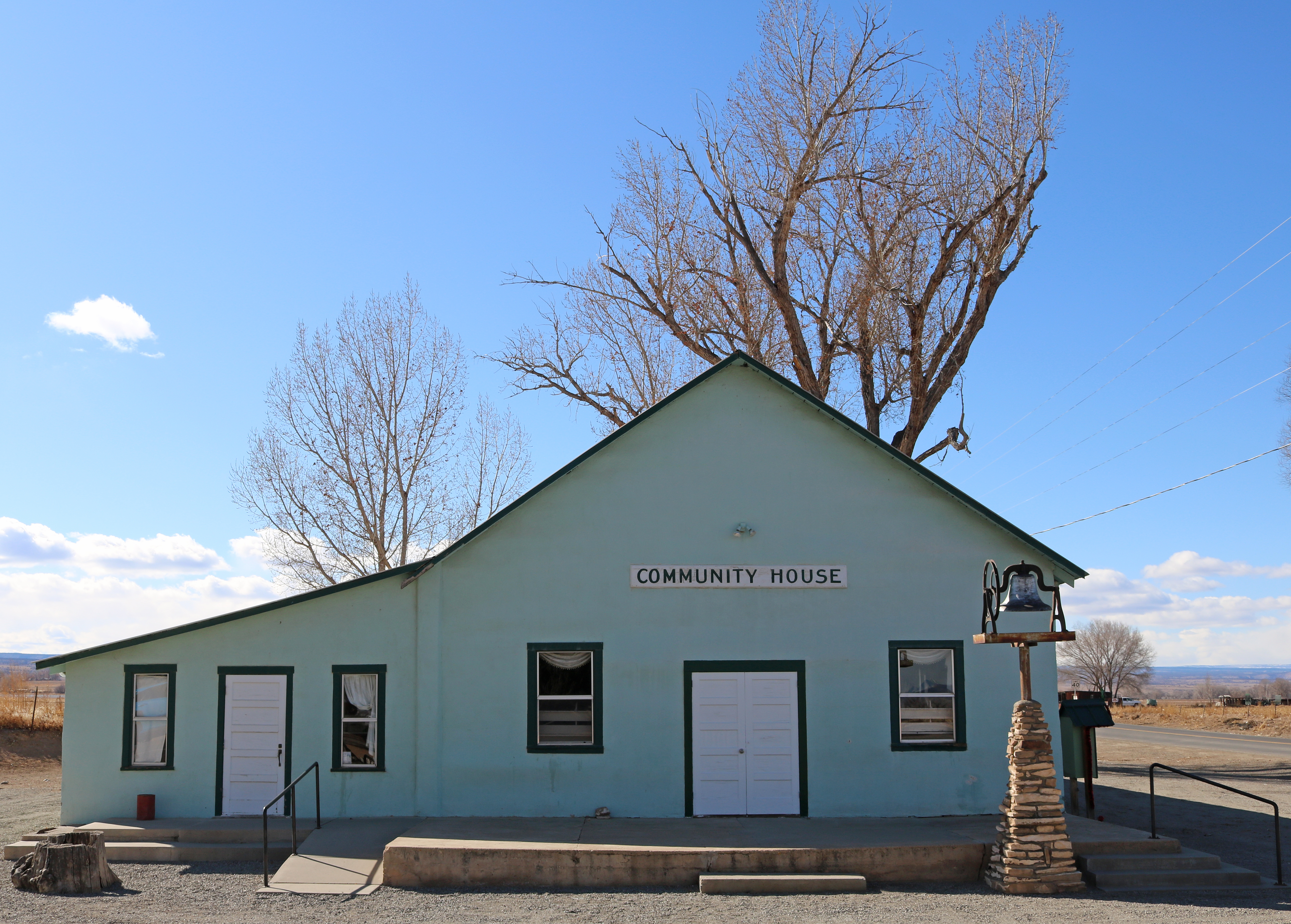
Pea Green's community house

Pea Green Corner is an unincorporated community in Montrose County, Colorado, United States. An agricultural community, its center lies at the intersection of Colorado State Highway 348 and Banner Road. Pea Green Corner is 7.9 miles (12.7 km) southwest of Delta, Colorado and 9.6 miles (15.4 km) northwest of Olathe via Colorado State Highway 348, which connects the communities.

Pea Green Corner's name stems from the color of its community hall and general store. In addition to the store and community house, the former school stands near the community's main intersection.

== History ==
The area was used by the Ute prior to their removal to Utah in 1881. After Herman Darling moved into the Uncompahgre Valley in 1884, he built a sawmill at an intersection known as Transfer, where lumber hauled off the plateau was sorted, graded, and hauled to Delta and Olathe. It was followed by the development of wells along the Transfer Road, the first being in the current Pea Green area, a blacksmith shop, and the schoolhouse.

The community's name comes from the pea green paint, provided by the federal government, used to paint the school house after it was completed in 1887. Education through eighth grade was offered at the Pea Green School through 1962 or 1963.

The Pea Green Community House, completed in 1927, was built by the Pea Green Community Club. The building is on the county heritage register and Colorado State Register of Historic Properties.

== Geography ==
Pea Green Corner is located on California Mesa. It is 9.6 miles (15.4 km) northwest of Olathe via Colorado State Highway 348, which goes through both communities.

== Economy ==
Pea Green is primarily a farming and ranching community with corn, onions, and pinto beans cultivated on area farms. Regional specialty Olathe sweet corn is grown near Pea Green.

== Education ==
Public education for students in Montrose County is provided by Montrose County School District RE-1J. The Pea Green Corner area located in Montrose County is zoned to Olathe Elementary School and Olathe Middle and High School.

The nearest college or university to Pea Green Corner is the regional campus of Colorado Mesa University in Montrose, 19.6 miles (31.5 km) from Pea Green Corner.

== Arts and culture ==
The Pea Green Community House hosts a seasonal bluegrass concert series, Pea Green Saturday Night. After fifteen years of shows, the series went on hiatus in February 2020 and resumed in January 2023.

Pea Green Corner is also home to a twice-annual vintage and antiques fair, Pickin' at the Pea. The fair occupies the Pea Green Store, former school, and surrounding grounds.
