= Colorado State Highway 233 =

State highway in Colorado, United States

State Highway 233
- Baxter Road
- Map of Pueblo County in south central Colorado with former SH 233 highlighted in red

Route information
- Maintained by CDOT
- Length: 2.147 mi (3.455 km)

Major junctions
- South end: US 50 Bus. west of Vineland
- North end: US 50 / SH 96 in Baxter

Location
- Country: United States
- State: Colorado
- Counties: Pueblo

Highway system
- Colorado State Highway System; Interstate; US; State; Scenic
← SH 231	→ SH 239

State Highway 233 (SH 233) was a state highway in Pueblo County, Colorado. SH 233's southern terminus was at U.S. Route 50 Business (US 50 Bus.) west of Vineland, and the northern terminus was at U.S. Route 50 (US 50) and SH 96 in Baxter. The highway was decommissioned in 2017, when ownership was transferred to Pueblo County.

== Route description ==
SH 233 ran for 2.1 miles (3.4 km), starting at a junction with US 50 Bus., heading north across the Arkansas River and ending at a junction with US 50 and SH 96.

== Major intersections ==
The entire route was in Pueblo County.

Location	mi	km	Destinations	Notes
	0.000	0.000	US 50 Bus. – Avondale, Pueblo	Southern terminus
Baxter	2.147	3.455	US 50 / SH 96	Northern terminus
1.000 mi = 1.609 km; 1.000 km = 0.621 mi
