= Colorado State Highway 47 =

State highway in Pueblo County, Colorado, United States

State Highway 47
- César Chávez Boulevard
- SH 47 highlighted in red

Route information
- Maintained by CDOT
- Length: 4.635 mi (7.459 km)

Major junctions
- West end: I-25 / US 85 / US 87 / US 50 in Pueblo
- East end: US 50 / SH 96 in Pueblo

Location
- Country: United States
- State: Colorado
- Counties: Pueblo

Highway system
- Colorado State Highway System; Interstate; US; State; Scenic
← SH 46	→ US 50

State Highway 47 (SH 47) is a 4.635-mile (7.459 km) state highway in Pueblo County, Colorado, United States, that connects Interstate 25/U.S. Route 50/U.S. Route 85/U.S. Route 87 (I-25/US 50/US 85/US 87) in Pueblo with US 50 and Colorado State Highway 96 (SH 96) in Pueblo; and thereby forming a northern loop off of US 50. (While the majority of the highway is located within the city limits of Pueblo, it briefly passes through two sections of unincorporated Pueblo County near its eastern terminus.)

== Route description ==
SH 47 begins at a single-point urban interchange with I-25 (John F. Kennedy Memorial Highway)/US 50/US 85/US 87 (I-25 exit 101) in northern Pueblo. (I-25/US 85/US 87 head north toward Pueblo West, Colorado Springs, and Denver. I-25/US 50/US 85/US 87 head south toward Colorado City, Trinidad, and Albuquerque, New Mexico. US 50 heads west toward Pueblo West and Cañon City.)

From its western terminus, SH 47 heads east as a six-lane divided highway and promptly has an overpass over a set of Union Pacific Railroad tracks and Pueblo Mall Drive before reaching an eastbound-only off ramp to Mel Harmon Drive (with access to Pueblo Mall). After an intersection with Dillon Street, SH 47 begins its controlled-access (freeway) section.

East of Dillon Street, SH 47 narrows to four lanes and crosses over Fountain Creek before reaching a diamond interchange with Jerry Murphy Road. (All exits along SH 47 are unnumbered.) East of the Jerry Murphy interchange, SH 47 begins running along the northern edge of a residential area and curves to head southeast. Next is a partial interchange with Walking Stick Boulevard, with westbound only exit and entrance. (Walking Stick Boulevard heads north–northeast along the northeastern edge of Colorado State University Pueblo [CSU Pueblo].)

Continuing southeast near the southwestern edge of CSU Pueblo, SH 47 passed under (but does not connect with) Bonforte Boulevard before reaching a diamond interchange with Troy Avenue. (Troy Avenue heads north along the eastern edge of CSU Pueblo and south along the eastern edge of the residential area that lies south of SH 47.) Further southeast, SH 47 briefly leaves the city limits of Pueblo and passes through a section of unincorporated Pueblo County as it begins curving to head south.

Near the end of its curve to the south, SH 47 re-enters Pueblo and immediately ends its controlled-access section at an intersection with Baculite Mesa Road/Neilson Avenue. (Baculite Mesa Road heads north, while Neilson Avenue heads south.) Shortly after finishing its curve to the south, SH 47 has a T intersection with Pete Jimenez Parkway (which heads east toward the Pueblo Memorial Airport). South of Pete Jimenez Parkway, SH 47 once again briefly leaves the city limits of Pueblo and narrows to a two-lane road as it continues south.

After an intersection with East 13th Street and crossing over East 11th Street, SH 47 re-enters Pueblo and immediately reaches its eastern terminus at a diamond interchange with US 50 and SH 96—the US 50 exit is unnumbered. (US 50 heads east toward La Junta and Lamar and Pueblo West and Cañon City. SH 96 heads west to become East 4th Street and then on toward Lake Pueblo State Park, Wetmore, and Westcliffe.)

== Major intersections ==
The entire route is in Pueblo, Pueblo County. All exits are unnumbered.

mi	km	Destinations	Notes
0.000	0.000	US 50 west	Continuation west from western terminus
0.000	0.000	I-25 north – Colorado Springs I-25 south / US 50 west – Trinidad	Western terminus; I-25 exit 101
0.3	0.48	TO North Freeway Road	Interchange; eastbound exit only
0.7	1.1	Jerry Murphy Road	Western end of freeway
1.7	2.7	Walking Stick Boulevard	Westbound exit and entrance
1.7	2.7	Bonforte Boulevard	Eastbound exit only
2.2	3.5	Troy Avenue	Eastern end of freeway
4.635	7.459	US 50 / SH 96 east – La Junta	Interchange; eastern terminus; access to Pueblo Memorial Airport
4.635	7.459	SH 96 west	Continuation west from eastern terminus
1.000 mi = 1.609 km; 1.000 km = 0.621 mi: Incomplete access

== See also ==
- List of state highways in Colorado
