= Colorado State Highway 227 =

State highway in Colorado, United States

State Highway 227

- Map of Pueblo County in south central Colorado with SH 227 highlighted in red

Route information
- Maintained by CDOT
- Length: 1.851 mi (2.979 km)

Major junctions
- South end: US 50 Bus. in Salt Creek
- North end: SH 96 in Pueblo

Location
- Country: United States
- State: Colorado
- Counties: Pueblo

Highway system
- Colorado State Highway System; Interstate; US; State; Scenic
| ← SH 224 | → SH 231 |

State Highway 227 (SH 227) is a state highway in Pueblo County, Colorado. SH 227's southern terminus is at U.S. Route 50 Business (US 50 Bus.) in Salt Creek, and the northern terminus is at SH 96 in Pueblo.

== Route description ==
The highway begins at an interchange with US 50 Business as a continuation of Roselawn Road. As La Crosse Avenue, the route crosses the Arkansas River into the city limit of Pueblo. The route makes a left onto South Joplin Avenue, intersecting a BNSF railroad. After passing near Bradford Park, the designation terminates at SH 96. Joplin Avenue continues northward.

== Major intersections ==
The entire route is in Pueblo County.

| Location | mi | km | Destinations | Notes |
|---|---|---|---|---|
| Salt Creek | 0.000 | 0.000 | US 50 Bus. | Southern terminus; interchange |
| Pueblo | 1.851 | 2.979 | SH 96 (4th Street) | Northern terminus |
1.000 mi = 1.609 km; 1.000 km = 0.621 mi

== See also ==
- List of state highways in Colorado
