= Colorado State Highway 348 =

State highway in Colorado, United States

State Highway 348
- SH 348 highlighted in red

Route information
- Maintained by CDOT
- Length: 17.06 mi (27.46 km)

Major junctions
- South end: US 50 in Olathe
- North end: US 50 in Delta

Location
- Country: United States
- State: Colorado
- Counties: Montrose, Delta

Highway system
- Colorado State Highway System; Interstate; US; State; Scenic
← SH 347	→ US 350

State Highway 348 (SH 348) is a 17.1-mile (27.5 km) state highway immediately southeast of Montrose and Delta counties in Colorado, United States that connects U.S. Route 50 (US 50) in Olathe US 50 in Delta.

== Route description ==
The route begins at US 50 in the south part of Delta as Eaton Avenue as it begins westward. After crossing a railroad, the highway stops as Eaton Ave as it exits Delta and enters farmland. It then continues southward through large rectangular fields until it meets D Road, where the route abruptly turns west. After an intersection with 25 Mesa Road, SH 348 continues on a southerly course, continuing to 5300 Road, where it abruptly turns right along Dalia Road. It then turns south and east abruptly before meeting US 50 Business a short distance before meeting US 50 in Olathe at its east end.

== History ==
The route was established in 1939, when it began at SH 65 (now deleted) south of Delta and continued east through Olathe and looped northeastward back to US 50. In 1954, SH 348's routing was corrected to a route from US 50 in Delta to US 50 in Olathe, as it does now. The entire route was paved by the year 1963.

== Major intersections ==
County	Location	mi	km	Destinations	Notes
Montrose	Olathe	0.00	0.00	David Road east – SH 789	Continuation east beyond southern terminus
Montrose	Olathe	0.00	0.00	US 50 north – Delta US 50 south – Montrose, Gunnison, Salida	Southern terminus
Montrose	Olathe	0.23	0.37	US 50 Bus. north – Delta US 50 Bus. south – Montrose	
Delta	Delta	17.06	27.46	US 50 north (Main Street) – Grand Junction, Fruita US 50 south (Main Street) – Olathe	Northern terminus
Delta	Delta	17.06	27.46	East 6th Street east	Continuation east beyond northern terminus
1.000 mi = 1.609 km; 1.000 km = 0.621 mi

== See also ==
- List of state highways in Colorado
