= Colorado State Highway 231 =

State highway in Pueblo County, Colorado, United States

State Highway 231
- 36th Lane
- SH 231 highlighted in red

Route information
- Maintained by CDOT
- Length: 2.05 mi (3.30 km)

Major junctions
- South end: US 50 Bus. in Vineland
- North end: US 50 / SH 96 in Devine

Location
- Country: United States
- State: Colorado
- Counties: Pueblo

Highway system
- Colorado State Highway System; Interstate; US; State; Scenic
← SH 227	→ SH 233

State Highway 231 (SH 231) is a state highway in Pueblo County, Colorado, United States. SH 231's southern terminus is at U.S. Route 50 Business (US 50 Bus.) in Vineland, and the northern terminus is at U.S. Route 50 (US 50) and SH 96 in Devine.

== Route description ==
SH 231 runs 2 miles (3.2 km), starting at a junction with US 50 Bus., heading north across the Arkansas River and ending at a junction with US 50 / SH 96.

== Major intersections ==
The entire route is in Pueblo County.

Location	mi	km	Destinations	Notes
Vineland	0.000	0.000	US 50 Bus. – Avondale, Pueblo	Southern terminus
Devine	2.050	3.299	US 50 / SH 96 – Avondale, Pueblo	Northern terminus
1.000 mi = 1.609 km; 1.000 km = 0.621 mi

== See also ==
- List of state highways in Colorado
