= Colorado State Highway 340 =

State highway in Colorado, United States

State Highway 340
- Broadway Rd
- Map of Mesa County in western Colorado with SH 340 highlighted in red

Route information
- Maintained by CDOT
- Length: 13.341 mi (21.470 km)

Major junctions
- West end: US 6 / US 50 in Fruita
- I-70 in Fruita
- East end: I-70 BL / US 50 in Grand Junction

Location
- Country: United States
- State: Colorado
- Counties: Mesa

Highway system
- Colorado State Highway System; Interstate; US; State; Scenic
← SH 330	→ SH 347

State Highway 340 (SH 340) is a 13.341 mi (21.470 km) long state highway in the U.S. state of Colorado. The highway's western end is at U.S. Route 6 (US 6) and US 50 in Fruita, and the eastern end is at the junction of US 50 and I-70 Business (I-70 Bus.) in Grand Junction. This highway is mainly used by the residents of Grand Junction's suburb Redlands.

== Route description ==
The route begins at a concurrency of US 6 and US 50 in Fruita. The route then turns onto cherry Street in Fruita where it junctions with Interstate 70 (I-70). The Highway then moves then heads south, passing over the Colorado River, where it heads into Redlands. There, it traverses the suburban area as Broadway Road, passing the Colorado National Monument on the south side of the highway. As SH 340 travels eastward, it enters Downtown Grand Junction, meeting again with the Colorado River and passing over the Riverside Parkway. Then, the highway ends at I-70 Bus. and US 50.

== History ==
The route was defined in 1939, when it moved along its current alignment but continued to US 6 in Palisade. This entire length was paved by 1955. The east terminus was then moved to SH 146, today's SH 141, in 1970. Two years later, the east terminus was moved all the way to where it is now in Grand Junction.

== Major intersections ==
The entire route is in Mesa County.

Location	mi	km	Destinations	Notes
Fruita	0.000	0.000	US 6 / US 50	Western terminus
Fruita	0.507	0.816	I-70 – Grand Junction, Green River	I-70 exit 19; interchange
Grand Junction	13	21	Riverside Parkway	Interchange; Eastbound exit only
Grand Junction	13.341	21.470	I-70 BL / US 50	Eastern terminus
1.000 mi = 1.609 km; 1.000 km = 0.621 mi: Concurrency terminus; Proposed; Incomplete access; Route transition

== See also ==
- List of state highways in Colorado
