= U.S. Route 50 Alternate =

U.S. Route 50 Alternate may refer to:

- U.S. Route 50 Alternate (California), an unofficially designated highway between Pollock Pines and Lake Tahoe in California, United States
- U.S. Route 50 Alternate (Nevada), a highway between Silver Springs and Fallon (via Fernley) in Nevada, United States
- U.S. Route 50 Alternate (Nevada–Utah), a former highway between Ely, Nevada and Moark Junction (in what is now eastern Spanish Fork) in Utah in the United States
