= Colorado State Highway 347 =

State highway in Colorado, United States

State Highway 347
- SH 347 highlighted in red

Route information
- Maintained by CDOT
- Length: 5.248 mi (8.446 km)

Major junctions
- South end: US 50 east of Montrose
- North end: Black Canyon of the Gunnison National Park

Location
- Country: United States
- State: Colorado
- Counties: Montrose

Highway system
- Colorado State Highway System; Interstate; US; State; Scenic
← SH 340	→ SH 348

State Highway 347 (SH 347) is a 5.2 mi (8.4 km) long state highway in western Colorado. SH 347's southern terminus is at U.S. Route 50 (US 50) east of Montrose, and the northern terminus is at Black Canyon of the Gunnison National Park.

== Route description ==
The route begins in the south at US 50 approximately ten miles east of Montrose and travels north to provide access to Black Canyon of the Gunnison National Park's south rim facilities.

== History ==
The route was established in 1939 with its current routing. The entire route from US 50 to Black Canyon of the Gunnison National Park was paved by 1960. The national park was upgraded from a national monument in October 1999.

== Major intersections ==
The entire route is in Montrose County.

Location	mi	km	Destinations	Notes
	0.000	0.000	US 50 – Montrose, Gunnison	
	5.248	8.446	Black Canyon of the Gunnison National Park	
1.000 mi = 1.609 km; 1.000 km = 0.621 mi
