= U.S. Route 50 in Colorado =

Section of U.S. Highway in Colorado, United States

U.S. Highway 50
- US 50 highlighted in red

Route information
- Maintained by CDOT
- Length: 467.583 mi (752.502 km)
- Existed: 1926–present

Major junctions
- West end: I-70 / US 6 / US 50 at the Utah state line near Mack
- I-70 / US 6 in Grand Junction; US 550 in Montrose; US 285 in Poncha Springs; I-25 / US 85 / US 87 in Pueblo; US 350 in La Junta; US 287 in Lamar; US 385 from Lamar to Granada; US 400 in Granada
- East end: US-50 / US-400 at the Kansas state line near Holly

Location
- Country: United States
- State: Colorado
- Counties: Mesa, Delta, Montrose, Gunnison, Saguache, Chaffee, Fremont, Pueblo, Otero, Bent, Prowers

Highway system
- United States Numbered Highway System; List; Special; Divided; Colorado State Highway System; Interstate; US; State; Scenic
← SH 47	→ SH 52

U.S. Route 50 (US 50) is a part of the U.S. Highway System that travels from West Sacramento, California, to Ocean City, Maryland. In the U.S. state of Colorado, US 50 is a major highway crossing through the lower midsection of the state. It connects the Western Slope with the lower Front Range. The highway serves the areas of Pueblo and Grand Junction as well as many other smaller areas along its corridor. The long-term project to widen the highway from two lanes to a four lane expressway between Grand Junction and Montrose was completed in January 2005. Only about 25% of the remainder of US 50 in Colorado is four lane highway.

== Route description ==
=== Western Slope ===
U.S. Highway 50 begins in Colorado at the Utah state line, concurrent with Interstate 70 as well as U.S. Highway 6. At Interstate 70 exit 11, U.S. Highway 6 & 50 end their concurrency with Interstate 70 and begin using the old highway alignment directly north of Interstate 70 while they travel through the communities of Mack, Loma, and Fruita. These communities were bypassed by Interstate 70. Near mile marker 15 the Colorado River adjoins Interstate 70 and runs nearby for the next 16 miles (26 km). In Fruita routes 6 and 50 intersect State Highway 340, the gateway to the Colorado National Monument. The monument's sandstone canyons and rock spires are visible to the south from the highways.

U.S. Highway 6 & 50 meet again with Interstate 70 at exit 26 where they begin a concurrent segment with Interstate 70 Business. The three routes travel southeast towards downtown Grand Junction. U.S. Highway 6 ends its concurrency with U.S. Highway 50 and Interstate 70 Business with a free flowing, grade separated interchange at North Avenue. The two remaining routes continue south onto surface streets in downtown Grand Junction. At Grand Avenue, they once again intersect with Colorado 340, which forms a loop between Grand Junction and Fruita. There are several points of access to the Colorado National Monument from the highway 340 loop.

After turning onto two east–west one-way streets (Ute and Pitkin Avenues); U.S. Highway 50 detaches itself from Interstate 70 Business, crosses the Colorado River and travels as an expressway, through suburban Grand Junction, to the cities of Delta and Montrose. Leaving Grand Junction and the area known as Orchard Mesa, the highway descends into the community of Whitewater and the Gunnison River valley. It intersects with State Highway 141 and begins a short concurrency with highway 141. Near this intersection Mount Sneffels (14,158 feet (4,315 m)) and the Sneffels Range of the San Juan Mountains are clearly visible at 80 miles (130 km) to the south-southeast.

As it follows the Gunnison River valley in a southeasterly direction, it is bounded on the east by Grand Mesa, which rises to over 11,000 feet (3,400 m) and on the west by the Uncompahgre Plateau, averaging 9,500 feet (2,900 m) and rising to 10,300 feet (3,100 m). U.S. Highway 50 travels through Delta as a typical surface street, having junctions with State Highway 92 and State Highway 348. Then highway 50 heads towards Montrose in the Uncompahgre River valley, passing through Olathe as an expressway bypass. Olathe is the home of a popular annual sweet corn festival. Agriculture in the area is greatly enhanced by irrigation water supplied by reservoirs on the Gunnison River. U.S 50 arrives in Montrose on Townsend Ave. The route then junctions with U.S. Highway 550 and turns east onto the San Juan Avenue bypass and then onto Main St. heading eastward out of Montrose.

The highway is a four-lane expressway from the Utah border to the eastern boundary of Montrose except for surface streets in the towns of Grand Junction, Delta and Montrose. From Montrose east to the Kansas border it is primarily a two-lane highway with only short stretches of four-lane highway. The widening of the last segment of the highway between Utah and Montrose was completed in January 2005. The first 94 miles (151 km) of route 50 is a four-lane highway. Of the remaining 375 miles (604 km), only about 90 miles (140 km) had been widened to four lanes as of 2012, primarily around larger towns.

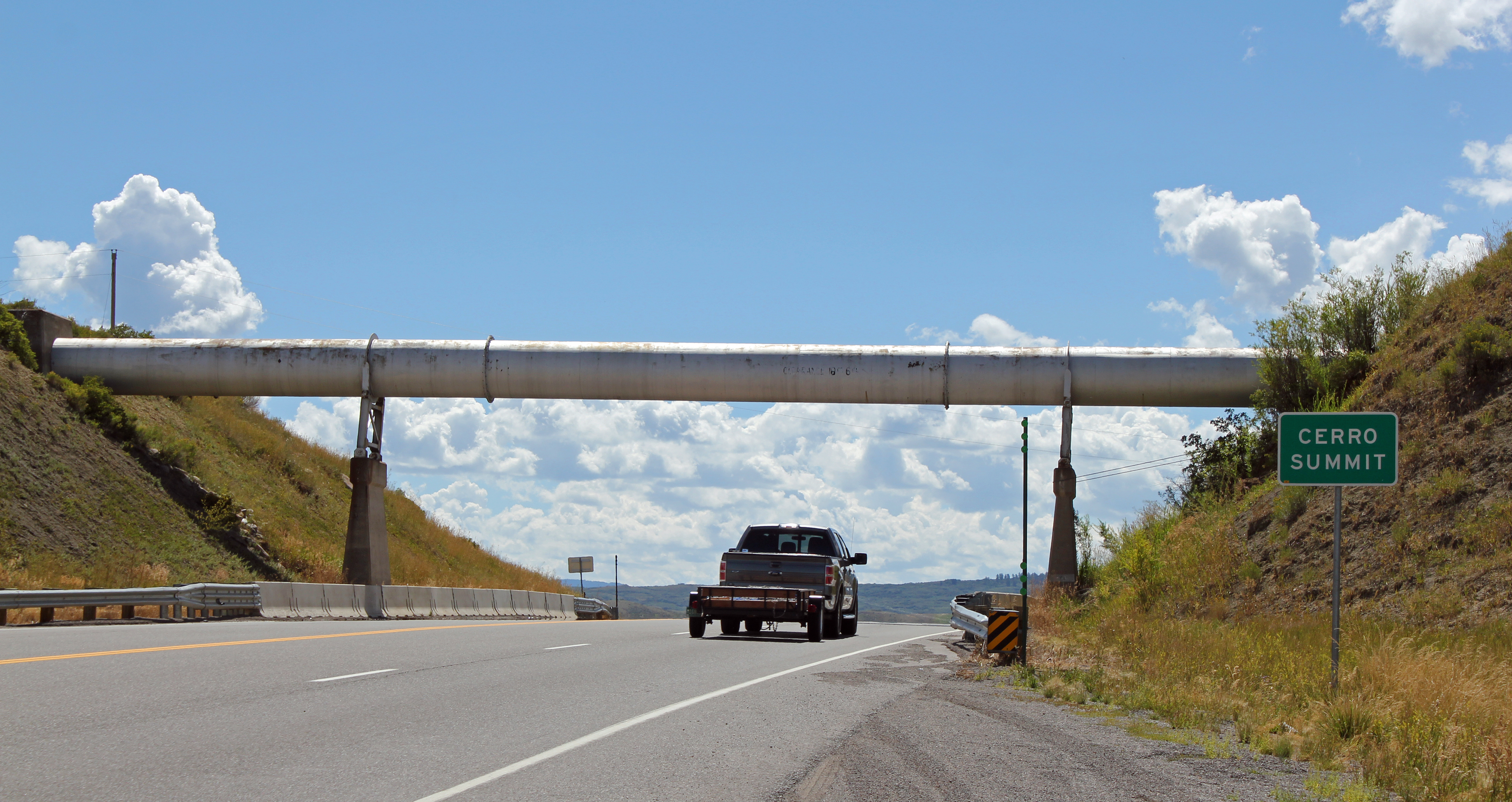
US 50 at Cerro Summit

About ten miles east of Montrose, the highway intersects SH 347. This 5.2-mile-long (8.4 km) highway provides access to the Black Canyon of the Gunnison National Park. Highway 50 then passes over Cerro Summit, about 8,000 feet (2,400 m), descends to the small community of Cimarron on the Cimarron River and ascends again to Blue Mesa Summit, 8,704 feet (2,653 m), before dropping into Blue Creek Canyon. 3 miles (4.8 km) north of the stream crossing, where Blue Creek empties into the Gunnison River, is the Curecanti Needle, a striking rock formation that is the symbol of the now defunct Denver & Rio Grande Western Railroad. The needle is now accessible only by boat since the abandoned railroad line was flooded by Morrow Point Lake, formed by the completion of the Crystal Dam in 1976. U.S. Highway 50 rises again over a third low pass before reaching State Highway 92. A short distance north of the intersection, highway 92 crosses the Blue Mesa Dam which forms Blue Mesa Reservoir, the largest body of water in the state of Colorado. Highway 50 crosses the reservoir at Middle Bridge, intersects State Highway 149 near the east end of the reservoir and continues into the town of Gunnison, home of Western Colorado University.

East of Gunnison the highway intersects with State Highway 114, passes through the communities of Parlin and Sargents and then ascends to Monarch Pass (elevation 11,312 feet (3,448 m)) on the continental divide. Monarch Pass is the highest point on the entire length of U.S. 50.

=== Arkansas River Valley ===
After descending from Monarch Pass, the highway enters the Arkansas River Valley near the town of Salida. The headwaters of the Arkansas are about 50 miles (80 km) north near Leadville, in Climax. The Arkansas is the second-longest tributary to the Mississippi-Missouri River system. U.S. 50 closely follows the Arkansas River from Salida to Kansas. East of Salida, the highway enters a deep canyon, dubbed Bighorn Sheep Canyon. There are several small communities in the canyon including Howard, Coaldale and Cotopaxi. The major industries in the canyon are fishing and river rafting.

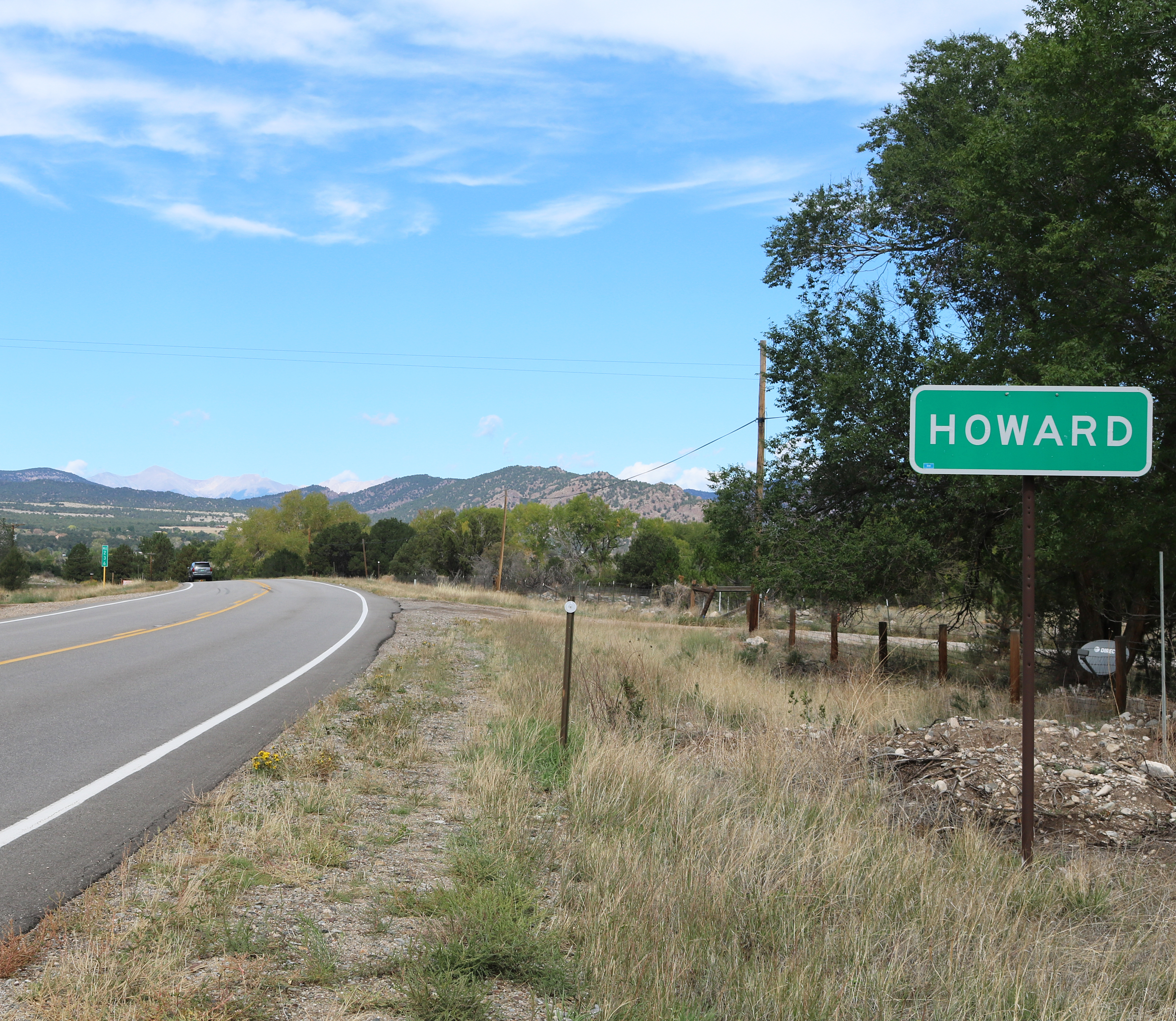
US 50 looking west entering Howard

Near mile marker 267, the highway crosses the river. Before the highway climbs uphill and leaves the canyon, Parkdale, Colorado is home to rafting, mining and a recreational area along the river. A short distance later, Colorado State Highway 9 intersects from the north as the highway enters the Royal Gorge area. Fremont County Road 3A leads to the rim of the Royal Gorge and its famous suspension bridge. The Royal Gorge Bridge is 1,260 feet (380 m) long and 956 feet (291 m) above the Arkansas River. It was built in 1929 and remains a popular tourist attraction that reopened to the public in 2014 after a devastating fire destroyed much of the surrounding park in 2013. The bridge remained intact but some boards were blackened. The damaged boards were replaced to maintain the integrity of the bridge.

After passing by the Royal Gorge, Highway 50 lowers off Eight Mile Hill and becomes a divided four lane highway. It then passes by the scenic route Skyline Drive on its way into Cañon City. At 1st Street, the highway is known locally as Royal Gorge Boulevard. Fremont County, which includes Cañon City, is the home to 15 prisons, including ADX Supermax, the only federal Supermax prison in the United States, located south of Florence, Colorado.

U.S. 50 intersects State Highway 67, State Highway 115 and State Highway 120 in Fremont County before crossing into Pueblo County. Then the highway enters Pueblo West on its way to intersect with State Highway 45. Highway 50 enters Pueblo, the home of the annual Colorado State Fair, as a six-lane divided highway and joins Interstate 25. Pueblo is at the edge of the Rocky Mountains, the beginning of the plains of southeastern Colorado. As the highway heads east across the plains, it generally follows the path of the Arkansas River until it reaches Kansas. Along the route it passes through several small communities including Fowler, Rocky Ford and La Junta.

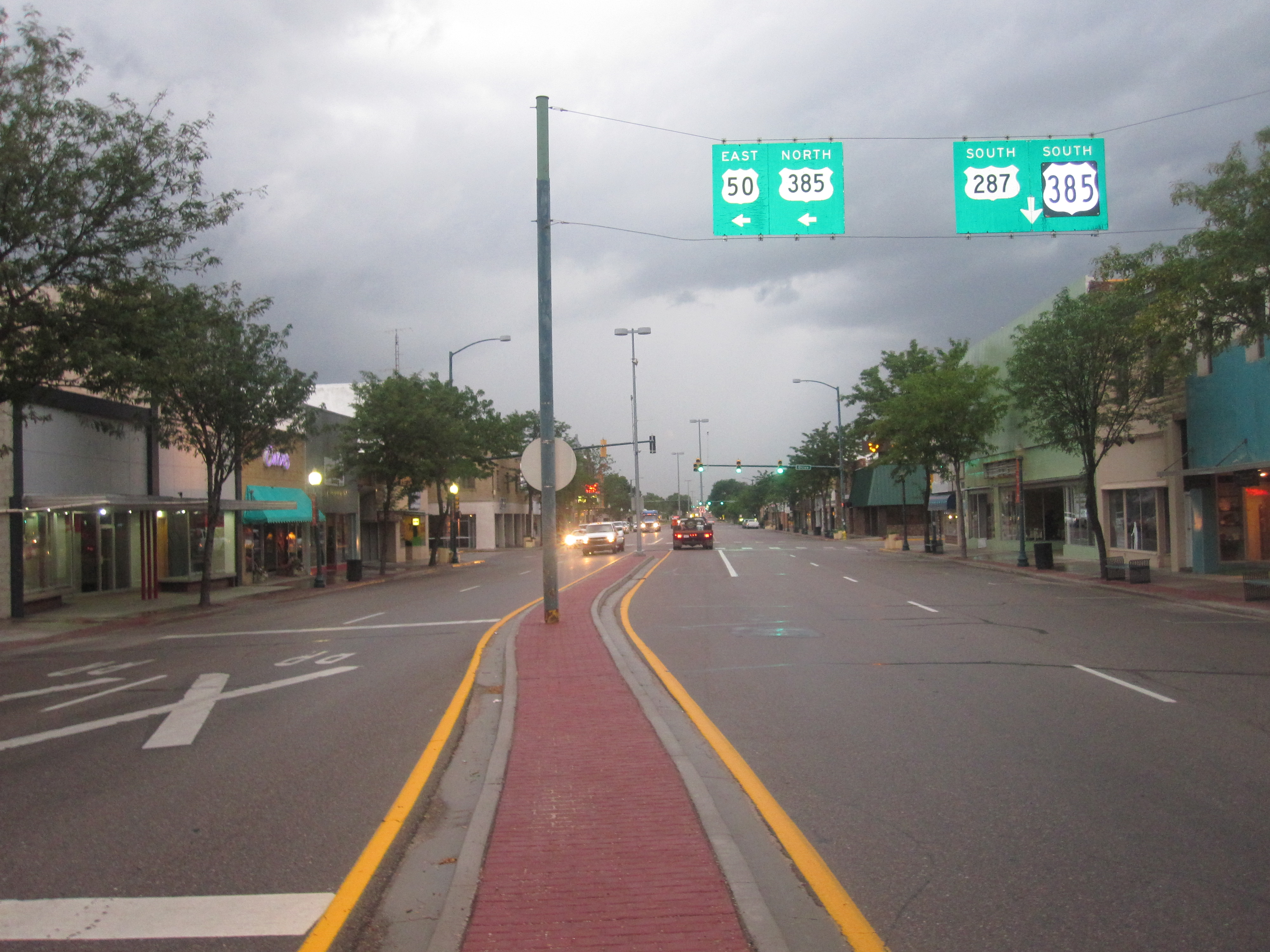
US 50 in Lamar approaching the intersection with US 385 and US 287

Just beyond La Junta, the highway passes Bent's Old Fort National Historic Site where travelers can find information about life on the plains. The highway continues on to Las Animas, Colorado, home of the Boggsville Historic Site, and Lamar.

Between Pueblo and Kansas, Highway 50 intersects with a number of state highways and U.S. highways. The U.S. highways are U.S. Highway 350, 287, 385 and 400. It runs concurrently with 287 and 385 for short distances and with 400 from Granada, Colorado, to Dodge City, Kansas, a distance of 136 miles (219 km).

U.S. route 50 in Colorado ends at the Kansas state line, about 4 miles (6.4 km) east of Holly, Colorado, 467.6 miles (752.5 km) from the Utah border. Holly has the lowest elevation of any town in Colorado at 3,392 feet (1,034 m).

== Major intersections ==
County	Location	mi	km	Exit	Destinations	Notes
Mesa		0.000	0.000		I-70 west (US 6 / US 50 west) – Salina	Continuation into Utah
Mesa		1.814	2.919	2	Rabbit Valley	Exit number follows I-70
Mesa	Mack	11.106	17.873		I-70 east	Eastern end of I-70 concurrency; I-70 exit 11
Mesa	Loma	15.132	24.353		SH 139 to I-70 – Loma, Rangely	To I-70 via SH 139 south
Mesa	Fruita	19.955	32.114		SH 340 east (Coulson Street) to I-70	Western terminus of SH 340
Mesa	Grand Junction	26.080	41.972		I-70 BL begins / I-70 – Denver, Utah	Western end of I-70 BL overlap; I-70 exit 26; diverging diamond interchange
Mesa	Grand Junction	28.244	45.454		Patterson Road / 24 Road Redlands Parkway south	Partial interchange
Mesa	Grand Junction	30.447 4.367	49.000 7.028		US 6 east (North Avenue)	Interchange; eastern end of US 6 concurency; no eastbound entrance; mileposts change to reflect I-70 BL mileage
Mesa	Grand Junction	4.952	7.969		SH 340 west (Grand Avenue) – Colorado National Monument	Eastern terminus of SH 340; eastbound eccess via Spruce Street
Mesa	Grand Junction	5.661 31.76	9.110 51.11		I-70 BL (Ute Avenue)	One-way street, inbound access only; mileposts change to reflect US 50 mileage
Mesa	Grand Junction	31.827	51.221		I-70 BL east (Pitkin Avenue east) to I-70 east – Denver	One-way street, outbound access only; eastern end of I-70 Bus. concurrency
Mesa	Grand Junction	32.235	51.877		Riverside Parkway to US 50 / I-70 BL	Interchange
Mesa	Grand Junction	34.206	55.049		B½ Road	Interchange; eastbound exit and westbound entrance; former SH 340 east
Mesa		38.504	61.966		SH 141 north (32 Road) to I-70 east – Clifton, Denver	Western end of SH 141 concurrency
Mesa	Whitewater	41.137	66.204		SH 141 south – Gateway, Naturita	Eastern end of SH 141 concurrency
Delta	Delta	70.919	114.133		SH 92 east (1st Street) to SH 65 north / SH 133 east – Grand Mesa, Black Canyon National Park North Rim	Western terminus of SH 92
Delta	Delta	71.428	114.952		SH 348 (6th Street)	
Montrose	Olathe	81.472	131.116		US 50 Bus. east – Olathe	Western terminus of US 50 Bus.
Montrose	Olathe	82.613	132.953		SH 348 west – Olathe	Eastern terminus of SH 348
Montrose	Olathe	83.145	133.809		US 50 Bus. west – Olathe	Eastern terminus of US 50 Bus.
Montrose	Montrose	91.878	147.863		US 550 south (Townsend Avenue south) – Ouray	Northern terminus of US 550; former US 50 east
Montrose		100.545	161.811		SH 347 north – Black Canyon National Park	Southern terminus of SH 347
Gunnison	Curecanti NRA	131.129	211.032		SH 92 west – Crawford, Hotchkiss	Eastern terminus of SH 92
Gunnison	Curecanti NRA	148.052	238.267		SH 149 south – Lake City, Creede, South Fork	Northern terminus of SH 149
Gunnison	Gunnison	157.394	253.301		SH 135 north (Main Street) – Crested Butte	Southern terminus of SH 135
Gunnison		165.601	266.509		SH 114 – Saguache	
Saguache	No major junctions					
Continental Divide		199.277	320.705	Monarch Pass Summit; Gunnision–Chafee county line		
Chaffee	Poncha Springs	216.770	348.857		US 285 north – Buena Vista, Leadville	Western end of US 285 concurrency
Chaffee	Poncha Springs	217.345	349.783		US 285 south – Monte Vista	Eastern end of US 285 concurrency
Chaffee	Salida	222.399	357.916		SH 291 north (Oak Street) / CR 105 – Salida National Historic District	Southern terminus of SH 291; former US 50 west
Fremont	Texas Creek	252.663	406.622		SH 69 south – Westcliffe	Northern terminus of SH 69
Fremont		269.130	433.123		SH 9 north – Guffey, Hartsel	Southern terminus of SH 9; USBR 76 west
Fremont	Cañon City	278.704	448.531		SH 115 east (9th Street) – Florence	Western terminus of SH-115
Fremont		285.633	459.682		SH 67 south / CR 67 north (Phantom Canyon Road) – Florence, Victor	Northern terminus of SH 67; southern terminus of CR 67
Fremont	Penrose	289.769	466.338	289	SH 115 – Penrose, Colorado Springs, Florence	Interchange
Fremont		294.339	473.693		SH 120 (R Street)	
Pueblo	Pueblo West	309.900	498.736	309	Purcell Boulevard	Interchange
Pueblo	Pueblo West	312.088	502.257	312	SH 45 south (Pueblo Boulevard)	Partial interchange; northern terminus of SH 45
Pueblo	Pueblo	314.598 101.389	506.296 163.170		I-25 north (US 85 / US 87 north) / SH 47 east – Colorado Springs, La Junta	Western end of I-25/US 85/US 87 concurrency; western terminus of SH-47; I-25 exit 101; mileposts change to reflect I-25 mileage
Pueblo	Pueblo	100.681	162.030	100B	29th Street	Exit number follows I-25; no westbound entrance
Pueblo	Pueblo	99.981 315.960	160.904 508.488		I-25 south (US 85 / US 87 south) – Trinidad	Southern end of I-25/US 85/US 87 concurrency; I-25 exit 100A; mileposts change to reflect US 50 mileage
Pueblo	Pueblo	318.707	512.909	318	SH 47 north (Cesar Chavez Boulevard) / SH 96 west (4th Street)	Western end of SH 96 concurrency; eastern terminus of SH-47; interchange
Pueblo	Pueblo	321.640	517.629	321	Pueblo Memorial Airport	Interchange
Pueblo	Baxter	322.130	518.418		SH 233 south	Northern terminus of SH 233
Pueblo	Devine	324.229	521.796		SH 231 south (36th Lane)	Northern terminus of SH 231
Pueblo		329.135	529.691	329	Pueblo Chemical Depot	Interchange
Pueblo	North Avondale	329.334	530.012		SH 96 east – Ordway, Boone	Eastern end of SH 96 concurrency
Pueblo		332.246	534.698		US 50 Bus. west – Avondale	Eastern terminus of US 50 Bus.
Pueblo		335.764	540.360		SH 209 north – Boone	Southern terminus of SH 209
Otero	Fowler	350.909	564.733		SH 167 (Main Street)	
Otero	Manzanola	359.712	578.900		SH 207 north (Park Street) – Crowley	Southern terminus of SH 207
Otero		366.970	590.581		SH 71 north – Ordway	Western end of SH 71 concurrency
Otero	Rocky Ford	368.109	592.414		SH 202 (2nd Street)	
Otero	Rocky Ford	368.930	593.735		SH 71 south / SH 266 (12th Street)	Eastern end of SH 71 concurrency
Otero	La Junta	378.419	609.006		SH 10 west – Walsenburg	Eastern terminus of SH 10
Otero	La Junta	378.816	609.645		US 350 west (Grant Avenue) / Santa Fe Trail Scenic Byway – Trinidad	Eastern terminus of US 350
Otero	La Junta	380.231	611.922		SH 109 (Bradish Avenue) to SH 194 – Cheraw, Kim, Bents Old Fort National Historic Site	
Bent	Las Animas	398.769	641.756		SH 101 (Carson Avenue) – Boggsville National Historic District	
Bent		400.160	643.995		SH 194 west – Bents Fort	Eastern terminus of SH 194; interchange
Bent		404.627	651.184		SH 183 south – Ft. Lyon	Northern terminus of SH 183
Bent		420.744	677.122		SH 196 – McClave	
Prowers		427.737	688.376		US 287 north – Limon	Interchange; western end of US 287 concurrency
Prowers	Lamar				US 50 Truck (Maple Street)	
Prowers	Lamar	435.390	700.692		US 287 south / US 385 south – Springfield	Eastern end of US 287 concurrency; western end of US 385 concurrency
Prowers	Lamar				US 50 Truck (Second Street)	
Prowers	Granada	452.769	728.661		US 385 north (Main Street) / US 400 begins – Bristol, Sheridan Lake, Cheyenne Wells	Eastern end of US 385 concurrency; western end of US 400 concurrency; western terminus of US 400
Prowers	Holly	463.506	745.941		SH 89 (First Avenue) – Lycan	
Prowers		467.583	752.502		US-50 east / US-400 east – Syracuse, Garden City	Continuation into Kansas
1.000 mi = 1.609 km; 1.000 km = 0.621 mi: Concurrency terminus; Incomplete access

== See also ==
- Million Dollar Highway

=== Related U.S. Routes ===
- U.S. Route 350
- U.S. Route 550

U.S. Route 50
Previous state: Utah	Colorado	Next state: Kansas
