= U.S. Route 350 =

Highway in the United States

U.S. Highway 350
- US 350 highlighted in red

Route information
- Auxiliary route of US 50
- Maintained by CDOT
- Length: 72.464 mi (116.620 km)

Major junctions
- West end: US 160 near Trinidad
- East end: US 50 in La Junta

Location
- Country: United States
- State: Colorado
- Counties: Las Animas, Otero

Highway system
- United States Numbered Highway System; List; Special; Divided; Colorado State Highway System; Interstate; US; State; Scenic
| ← SH 348 | → SH 368 |

U.S. Highway 350 (US 350) is a 73-mile-long (117 km) northeast–southwest United States highway located entirely within the state of Colorado.

== Route description ==
US 350 starts at a junction with US 160 northeast of Trinidad. The highway runs northeast, past the Perry Stokes Airport and crossing the Purgatoire River. It then continues the rest of its length along a route chosen by the Atchison, Topeka and Santa Fe Railway, and close to the Mountain Branch of the Santa Fe Trail. The highway passes just northeast of the Piñon Canyon Maneuver Site, then crosses Comanche National Grassland before a junction with SH 71 going north. At La Junta, the highway turns east on 5th Street, then north on Barnes Avenue before ending at a junction with US 50.

== History ==
Until the 1990s, US 350 continued into Trinidad, where it intersected with Interstate 25 (I-25). Prior to the creation of I-25, the road terminated at US 85 and US 87.

== Major intersections ==
| County | Location | mi | km | Destinations | Notes |
|---|---|---|---|---|---|
| Las Animas | | 0.000 | 0.000 | US 160 / Santa Fe Trail Scenic Byway – Trinidad, Springfield | Western terminus |
| Otero | | 59.412 | 95.614 | SH 71 north – Rocky Ford | Southern terminus of SH 71 |
| Otero | La Junta | 72.464 | 116.620 | US 50 / Santa Fe Trail Scenic Byway – Pueblo, Lamar | Eastern terminus |
1.000 mi = 1.609 km; 1.000 km = 0.621 mi

== See also ==
=== Related U.S. Routes ===
- U.S. Route 50
