= Blue Mesa Summit =

Mountain pass in Colorado, USA

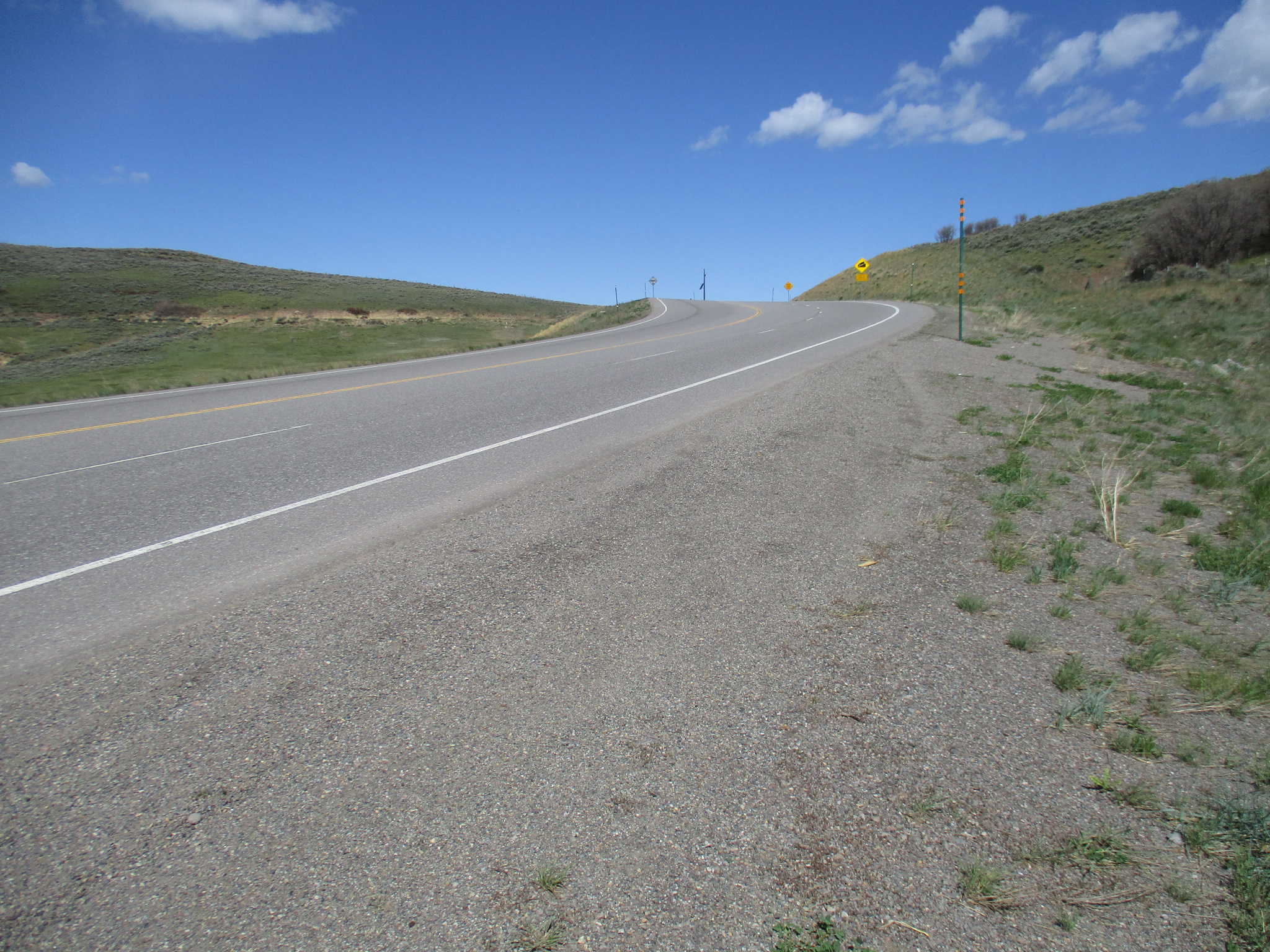
- Blue Mesa Summit

- Location within Colorado
- Elevation: 8,704 feet (2,653 m)
- Traversed by: US 50

Third Approach
- Location: Gunnison County, Colorado
- Coordinates: 38°23′10″N 107°26′01″W
- Topo map: USGS Curecanti Needle

Blue Mesa Summit (elevation 8,704 feet (2,653 m)) is a mountain pass in Gunnison County of west-central Colorado. The pass is traversed by U.S. Route 50 and divides the watersheds of Little Cimarron River to the west and Blue Creek to the east.

== History ==
Blue Mesa Summit had long been used by Utes, trappers, and explorers who were traveling between the Gunnison Valley to the east and the Uncompahgre Valley to the west. By the mid-1870s, mining in the San Juan Mountains resulted in the construction of trails and wagon roads connecting the increasing number of new mining camps and growing towns. Road builder Otto Mears had constructed the Saguache and San Juan Toll Road connecting the towns of Saguache and Lake City in 1874. Needed was a road connecting this route to the mining town of Ouray to the west. Mears’ new Lake Fork and Uncompahgre Toll Road was opened in 1878, and it followed the established trail over Blue Mesa Summit.

In the 1930s, the newly designated U.S. Route 50 was routed over Blue Mesa Summit and the location follows closely the historic toll road over the pass.
