= Cerro Summit =

Mountain pass in Colorado, USA

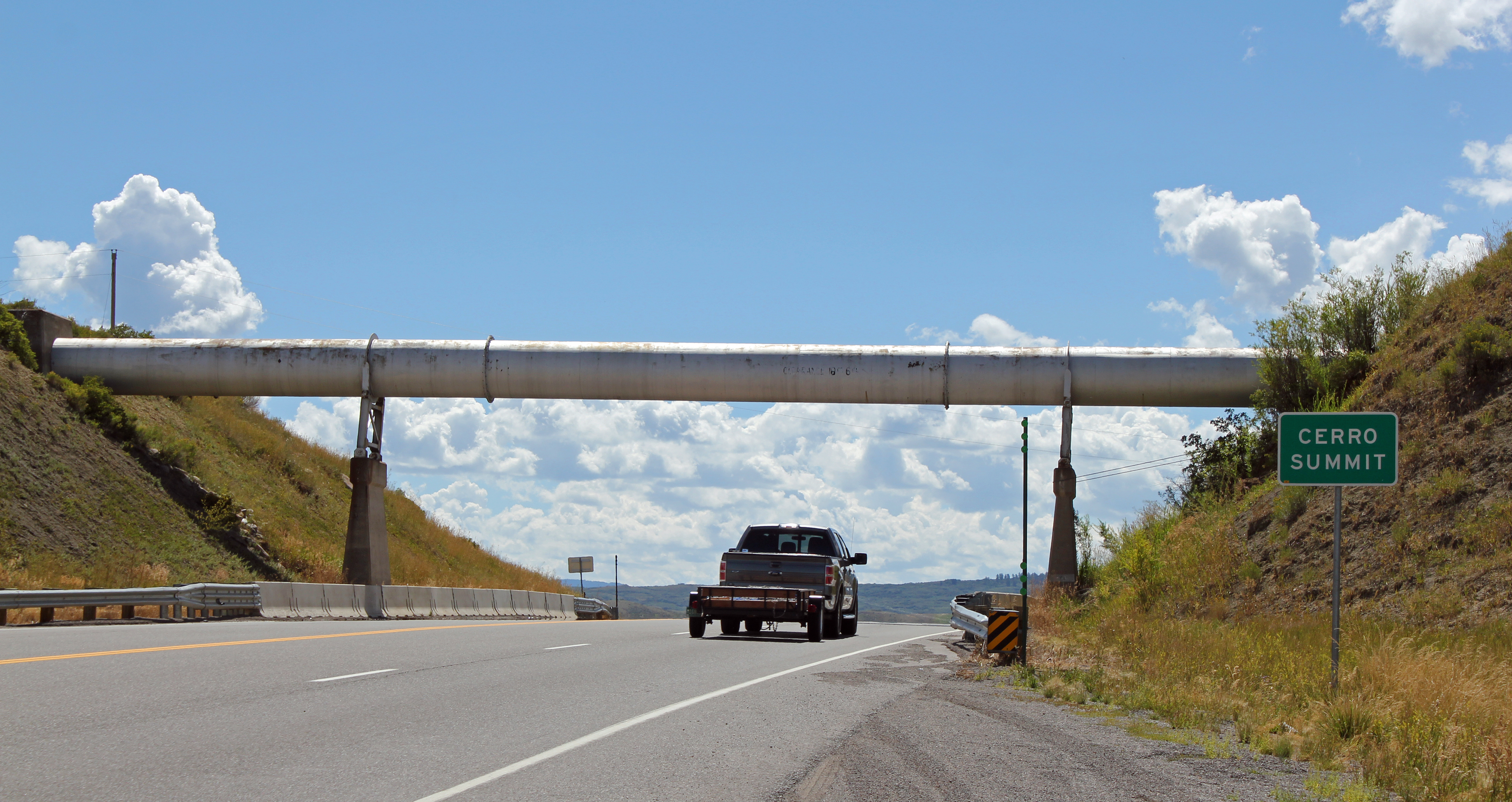
- The summit in 2014.
- Interactive map of Cerro Summit
- Elevation: 8,042 ft (2,451 m)
- Traversed by: U.S. Route 50

Third Approach
- Location: Montrose County, Colorado, United States
- Coordinates: 38.44443°N 107.642498°W

Cerro Summit (elevation 8,042 feet (2,451 m)) is a mountain pass in the State of Colorado, located about 14 miles east of Montrose, Colorado. It divides the watershed of the Cimmaron River to the east and the Uncompahgre River to the west, both of which eventually flow into the Gunnison River.

The summit is traversed by U.S. Route 50. Until 1949, Cerro Summit was part of the Denver and Rio Grande Western Railroad's Black Canyon line which ran between Gunnison and Montrose. When constructed in 1882, the route was originally part of the D&RGW's transcontinental line to Salt Lake City and remained so until more direct routes were built in the early 20th century.

Although grades on U.S. 50 are gentle, the former rail line over Cerro Summit had a ruling gradient of 4% or 1 in 25 and it was not uncommon for most freight trains to require a banker.

Since 2015, Cerro Summit has been home to the Cerro Summit Recreation Area, an open space managed by the City of Montrose which features a network of hiking trails.
