= Riverside Parkway =

Road in Grand Junction, Colorado

- Length: 7 mi (11 km)
- Location: Grand Junction
- West end: Redlands Parkway
- Major junctions: SH 340 (Broadway Road); US 50
- East end: 29 Road

Construction
- Inauguration: 2006

The Riverside Parkway is a 7-mile (11 km), five-lane limited-access road in the lower central business district of Grand Junction, Colorado. Paralleling the Colorado River, it connects several of the major highways in the city, and has bike lanes in both directions. Billboards are not allowed within 300 feet (91 m) of the parkway.
