= Special routes of U.S. Route 50 =

Special routes of U.S. Route 50

Highway system
- United States Numbered Highway System; List; Special; Divided

Several special routes of U.S. Route 50 exist. In order from west to east they are as follows.

== California ==
=== Oakland business loop ===
U.S. Route 50 Business
- Location: Oakland, California
- Existed: yes

U.S. Route 50 Business (US 50 Bus.) was a business route of US 50 in Oakland, California. It existed when US 50 use to extend west to San Francisco. The business loop's western terminus was at the MacArthur Maze interchange. From there, it ran concurrently with State Route 17 (present-day Interstate 880) along Cypress Street, later the Cypress Freeway, to Broadway in Downtown Oakland. US 50 Bus. then headed north on Broadway and then east on Grand Avenue towards the end of Lake Merritt. The business route then turned south on El Embarcadaro and then east on Lakeshore Avenue before rejoining US 50 at MacArthur Boulevard, later the MacArthur Freeway. The business route was decommissioned when US 50 was truncated back to West Sacramento and Interstate 580 replaced the US route through Oakland.

=== Sacramento business loop ===
U.S. Route 50 Business
- Location: Sacramento, California
- Existed: yes

U.S. Route 50 Business (US 50 Bus.) was a business route of US 50 in Sacramento, California.

=== California alternate route ===
U.S. Route 50 Alternate
- Location: Pollock Pines to South Lake Tahoe, California
- Existed: yes

U.S. Route 50 Alternate (US 50 Alt.) was an alternate route of US 50 in the U.S. state of California. The route was used as a detour around flooding in the American River canyon, which the main route of US 50 uses to scale the Sierra Nevada. It has been activated and deactivated on multiple occasions and concealed signs have been permanently installed so the route can be reactivated as needed. The route has never been officially approved by AASHTO. The route follows a local road called Mormon Emigrant Trail from Sly Park up a ridge to eventually connect with California State Route 88 over Carson Pass, using a small portion of California State Route 89 over Luther Pass to reconnect with US 50 near South Lake Tahoe.

Major intersections

The former route followed present-day portions of Sly Park Road, Mormon Emigrant Trail in its entirety, and portions of SR 88 and SR 89.

County	Location	mi	km	Destinations	Notes
El Dorado	Pollock Pines	0.0	0.0	Sly Park Road north to Pony Express Trail	Continuation beyond US 50
El Dorado	Pollock Pines	0.0	0.0	US 50 (El Dorado Freeway) – Sacramento, South Lake Tahoe	Interchange; former western terminus; west end of CR E16 overlap; northern terminus of CR E16; US 50 exit 60
El Dorado		4.7	7.6	CR E16 south (Sly Park Road south) – Pleasant Valley	East end of CR E16 overlap
El Dorado		4.7 29.2	7.6 47.0	Mormon Emigrant Trail closed in winters	
Amador		29.2	47.0	SR 88 west – Jackson	West end of SR 88 overlap
Alpine		46.5	74.8	Carson Pass, elevation 8,573 feet (2,613 m)	
Alpine		55.3	89.0	SR 88 east / SR 89 south – Woodfords, Markleeville	East end of SR 88 overlap; west end of SR 89 overlap
El Dorado		57.9	93.2	Luther Pass, elevation 7,740 feet (2,360 m)	
El Dorado	Meyers	66.5	107.0	US 50 / SR 89 north – South Lake Tahoe, Placerville	Roundabout; former eastern terminus; east end of SR 89 overlap
1.000 mi = 1.609 km; 1.000 km = 0.621 mi: Concurrency terminus

== Nevada ==
=== Carson City temporary route ===
Temporary U.S. Route 50
- Location: Carson City, Nevada
- Existed: yes

U.S. Route 50 Temporary (US 50 Temp.) was a temporary route of US 50 in the U.S. state of Nevada. It was in use when from 2009 to 2018 when Interstate 580 was partially built and terminated at the Fairview Drive exit. It followed Fairview Drive to connect the freeway alignment with the Carson Street Alignment. It was removed once I-580 was completed.

=== Carson City business loop ===
U.S. Route 50 Business
- Location: Carson City, Nevada
- Existed: yes

U.S. Route 50 Business (US 50 Bus.) was a business route of US 50 in the U.S. state of Nevada, and carried the unsigned designation of SR 530. It followed the original alignment of US 50 along William Street once US 50 was moved to an alignment concurrent with Interstate 580. It was removed as part of a mileage swap between the Nevada Department of Transportation and Carson City public works in 2010.

=== Silver Springs–Fallon alternate route ===
U.S. Route 50 Alternate
- Location: Silver Springs to Fallon, Nevada

U.S. Route 50 Alternate (US 50 Alt.) is an alternate route of US 50 in the U.S. state of Nevada.

== Nevada–Utah ==
=== Ely–Moark Junction alternate route ===
U.S. Route 50 Alternate
- Location: Ely, Nevada to Moark Junction, Utah
- Length: 292 mi (470 km)
- Existed: 1953–1976

U.S. Route 50 Alternate (US 50 Alt.) was a 292-mile (470 km) alternate route of US 50 in Nevada and Utah. It existed from the 1953 to the 1976 and followed the original routing of US 50 from Ely, Nevada to Moark Junction, Utah (roughly 11 miles [18 km] south-southeast of Provo in what is what is now the east edge of Spanish Fork), via Salt Lake City. US 50 Alt. ran along what is now U.S. Route 93, U.S. Route 93 Alternate, Interstate 80, Utah State Route 201 and U.S. Route 89.

US 50 Alt. was created when US 50 was routed in 1953 to run concurrent with U.S. Route 6 between Ely and Moark Junction and the former US 50 routing was designated east US 50 Alt. The designation was deleted in the 1970s, about the time that US 50 was again rerouted (to its current routing) in 1976.

== Utah ==
=== Kyune–Castle Gate temporary route ===
Temporary U.S. Route 50
- Location: Kyune to Castle Gate, Utah
- Length: 17.1 mi (27.5 km)
- Existed: yes

U.S. Route 50 Temporary (US 50 Temp.) was a 17.1-mile (27.5 km) temporary route of US 50 in Utah, departing the alignment of what is now U.S. Route 6 (UT 6) at the site of the former community of Kyune (roughly 3.7 miles [6.0 km] southeast of Colton) along what is now called Emma Park Road and returning to US 6 in southern Castle Gate via what is now U.S. Route 191 (US 191).

The first road built between Helper and Soldier Summit exited the Price River Canyon along modern US 191 near Castle Gate and returned to the current alignment of UT 6 via Emma Park Road to bypass a narrow, meandering portion of the canyon. Once announced this road would be used for the Midland Trail (precursor to US 6) a shorter, more direct route was proposed that remained in Price Canyon for the entire ascent. Once finished both routes were briefly used for US 50. This portion of then US 50 is today designated US 6. The road is occasionally as a detour when US 6 through Price Canyon is closed. Specifically this alternate route was used for a period of time in 1966 while the main route in Price Canyon was being improved. Emma Park Road is currently designated as a county road within Utah and Carbon counties.

== Colorado ==
=== Pueblo–Avondale ===
U.S. Highway 50 Business
- Location: Pueblo–Avondale
- Length: 18.3 mi (29.5 km)

U.S. Route 50 Business is a business route of U.S. Route 50 in the U.S. state of Colorado.

Major intersections

The entire route is in Pueblo County.

Location	mi	km	Destinations	Notes
Pueblo	0.000	0.000	I-25 / US 85 / US 87 north / US 50 – Colorado Springs, La Junta	Western end of I-25/US 85/US 87 concurrency; western terminus
Pueblo	0.7	1.1	I-25 / US 85 / US 87 south – Trinidad	Eastern end of I-25/US 85/US 87 concurrency; I-25 exit 99B
Pueblo	1.3	2.1	SH 96	
Pueblo	1.5	2.4	City Center Drive to I-25 / US 85 / US 87	To I-25 exit 98B
Pueblo	2.3	3.7	I-25 / US 85 / US 87 – Trinidad, Colorado Springs, Cañon City	I-25 exit 98A
Salt Creek	3.7	6.0	SH 227 north	Southern terminus of SH 227
	8.7	14.0	SH 233 north	Southern terminus of SH 233
Vineland	10.7	17.2	SH 231 north	Southern terminus of SH 231
Avondale	18.1	29.1	US 50	Eastern terminus
1.000 mi = 1.609 km; 1.000 km = 0.621 mi: Concurrency terminus

=== Olathe ===
U.S. Highway 50 Business
- Location: Olathe
- Length: 1.5 mi (2.4 km)

U.S. Route 50 Business is a business route of U.S. Route 50 in the U.S. state of Colorado.

Major intersections

The entire route is in Olathe, Montrose County.

mi	km	Destinations	Notes
0.000	0.000	US 50 – Delta, Montrose	Western terminus
0.6	0.97	SH 348 (5th Street)	
1.5	2.4	US 50	Eastern terminus
1.000 mi = 1.609 km; 1.000 km = 0.621 mi

== Kansas ==
=== Garden City alternate route ===
U.S. Highway 50 Alternate
- Location: Garden City, Kansas
- Existed: yes

U.S. Route 50 Alternate (US-50 Alt.) was an alternate route of US-50 in the U.S. state of Kansas.

=== Garden City business loop ===
U.S. Highway 50 Business
- Location: Garden City, Kansas
- Length: 5.1 mi (8.2 km)

U.S. Route 50 Business (US-50 Bus.) is a business route of US-50 in the U.S. state of Kansas.

=== Garden City bypass ===
U.S. Highway 50 Bypass
- Location: Garden City, Kansas
- Existed: yes

U.S. Route 50 Bypass (US-50 Byp.) was a bypass of US-50 in the U.S. state of Kansas.

=== Dodge City alternate route ===
U.S. Highway 50 Alternate
- Location: Dodge City, Kansas
- Existed: yes

U.S. Route 50 Alternate (US-50 Alt.) was an alternate route of US-50 in the U.S. state of Kansas.

=== Dodge City business loop ===
U.S. Highway 50 Business
- Location: Dodge City, Kansas
- Existed: yes

U.S. Route 50 Business (US-50 Bus.) was a business route of US-50 in the U.S. state of Kansas.

=== Dodge City bypass ===
U.S. Highway 50 Bypass
- Location: Dodge City, Kansas
- Existed: yes

U.S. Route 50 Bypass (US-50 Byp.) was a bypass of US-50 in the U.S. state of Kansas.

=== Ottawa business loop ===
U.S. Highway 50 Business
- Location: Ottawa, Kansas
- Existed: yes

U.S. Route 50 Business (US-50 Bus.) was a business route of US-50 in the U.S. state of Kansas.

U.S. Route 50 Optional (US 50 Opt.) was an optional route of US 50 in the U.S. states of Kansas and Missouri.

== Missouri ==
=== Warrensburg business loop ===
U.S. Route 50 Business
- Location: Warrensburg, Missouri
- Length: 2.5 mi (4.0 km)

U.S. Route 50 Business (US 50 Bus.) is a business route of US 50 in the U.S. state of Missouri.

=== Knob Noster business loop ===
U.S. Route 50 Business
- Location: Knob Noster, Missouri

U.S. Route 50 Business (US 50 Bus.) is a business route of US 50 in the U.S. state of Missouri.

=== Smithton spur route ===
U.S. Route 50 Spur
- Location: Smithton, Missouri
- Length: 1.2 mi (1.9 km)
- Existed: No

U.S. Route 50 Spur (US 50 Spur) is a spur route of US 50 in the U.S. state of Missouri.

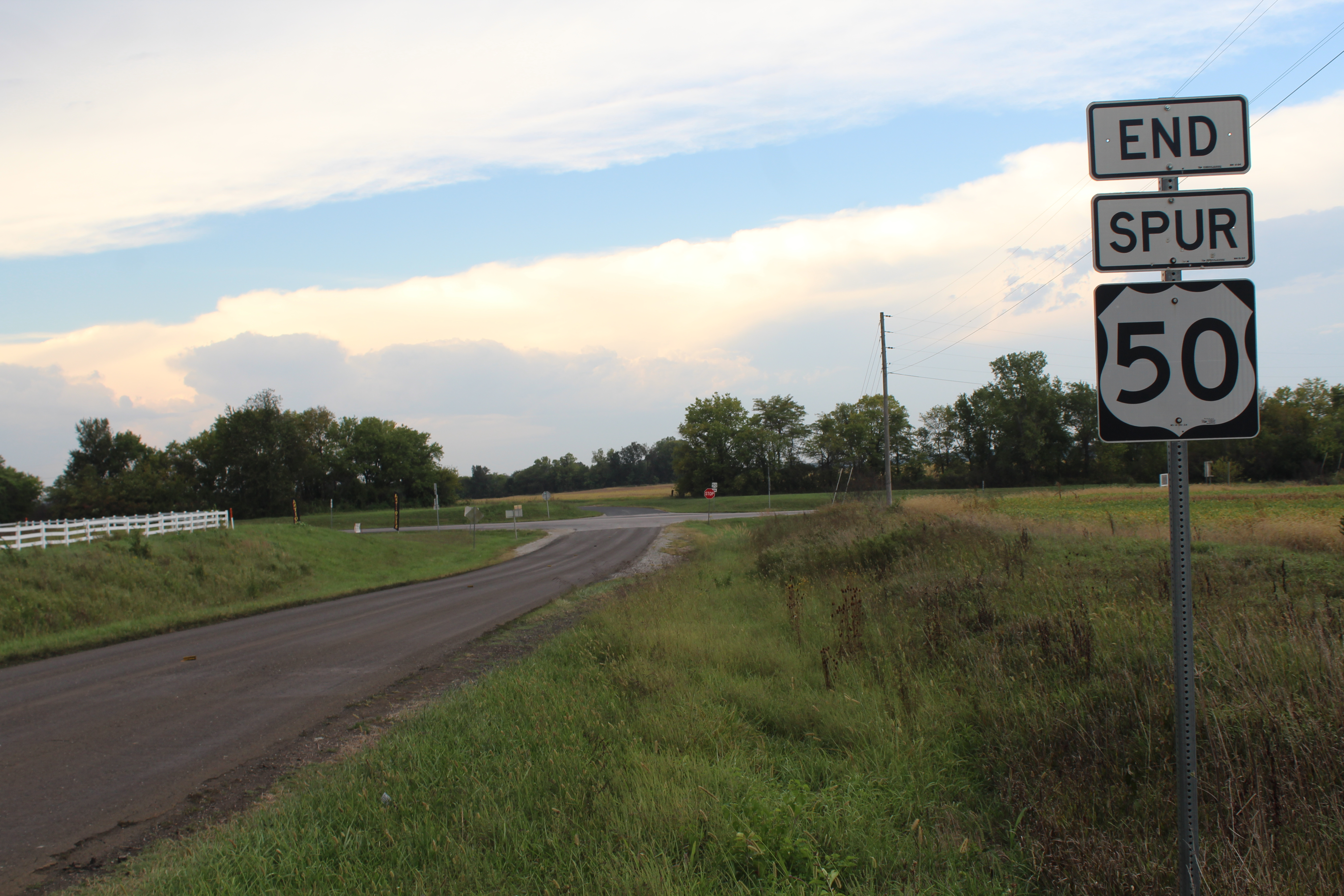
Northern end of spur 50

Major intersections

The entire route is in Smithton, Pettis County.

mi	km	Destinations	Notes
0.000	0.000	US 50 / Route W – Smithton	North Western terminus of U.S. 50 Spur and Route W
0.5	0.80	Route W (Overstreet Rd)	U.S. 50 Spur Continues South while Route W goes East
1.2	1.9	Route W	South Eastern terminus
1.000 mi = 1.609 km; 1.000 km = 0.621 mi: Concurrency terminus

=== California business route ===
U.S. Route 50 Business
- Location: California, Missouri
- Length: 5.2 mi (8.4 km)
- Existed: 2010–present

U.S. Route 50 Business (US 50 Bus.) is a business route of US 50 in the U.S. state of Missouri.

=== St. Martins business loop ===
U.S. Route 50 Business
- Location: St. Martins, Missouri
- Length: 4.3 mi (6.9 km)

U.S. Route 50 Business (US 50 Bus.) is a business route of US 50 in the U.S. state of Missouri.

=== Jefferson City business loop 1 ===
U.S. Route 50 Business
- Location: Jefferson City, Missouri
- Existed: yes

U.S. Route 50 Business (US 50 Bus.) was a business route of US 50 in the U.S. state of Missouri.

=== Jefferson City business loop 2 ===
U.S. Route 50 Business
- Location: Jefferson City, Missouri

U.S. Route 50 Business (US 50 Bus.) is a business route of US 50 in the U.S. state of Missouri.

=== St. Louis business loop ===
U.S. Route 50 Business
- Location: Brentwood to St. Louis, Missouri
- Existed: yes

U.S. Route 50 Business (US 50 Bus.) was a business route of US 50 in the U.S. state of Missouri.

=== St. Louis truck route ===
U.S. Route 50 Truck
- Location: St. Louis, Missouri
- Existed: yes

U.S. Route 50 Truck (US 50 Truck) was a truck route of US 50 in the U.S. state of Missouri.

== Missouri–Illinois ==
=== St. Louis bypass ===
U.S. Route 50 Bypass
- Location: Sunset Hills, Missouri–Fairview Heights, Illinois
- Existed: 1955–June 25, 1974

U.S. Route 50 Bypass (US 50 Byp.) was a bypass route of US 50 in the U.S. states of Missouri and Illinois. In 1955, US 50 Bypass was formed as a southern bypass of St. Louis. Between 1955 and 1957, US 50 Bypass originally ran roughly via present-day Lindbergh Boulevard, Jefferson Barracks Bridge, IL 3, IL 158, IL 163, IL 157, IL 13, North Belt West, and IL 159 before ending at US 50 in Fairview Heights. In 1958, part of the bypass route in Illinois was rerouted north to connect to Cahokia. The new part of the route followed via present-day IL 3 (roughly) and IL 157. On June 25, 1974, AASHTO approved the decommissioning of US 50 Bypass in order for US 50 to avoid St. Louis while also connecting to East St. Louis.

== Illinois ==
=== Sumner–Lawrenceville alternate route ===
U.S. Route 50 Alternate
- Location: Sumner to Lawrenceville, Illinois
- Existed: 1946–1962

U.S. Route 50 Alternate (US 50 Alt.) was an alternate route of US 50 in the U.S. state of Illinois. Before 1946, US 50 originally ran through Sumner and Lawrenceville. After US 50 was rerouted north of the original alignment in 1946, the old alignment was then signed as US 50 Alternate. US 50 Alternate was then decommissioned in 1962 after the US 50 expressway bypassed downtown Lawrenceville. The old US 50 alignment was then signed as Illinois Route 250 in 1965.

=== Lawrenceville business loop ===
U.S. Route 50 Business
- Location: Lawrenceville, Illinois
- Length: 3.6 mi (5.8 km)
- Existed: 1962–present

U.S. Route 50 Business (US 50 Bus.) is a business route of US 50 in the U.S. state of Illinois. After 1962, US 50 was rerouted north to bypass Lawrenceville and the former alignment that only crossed through Lawrenceville was signed as US 50 Business.

== Indiana ==
=== Vincennes business loop ===
U.S. Route 50 Business
- Location: Vincennes, Indiana
- Existed: yes

U.S. Route 50 Business (US 50 Bus.) was a business route of US 50 in the U.S. state of Indiana.

=== Washington business loop ===
U.S. Route 50 Business
- Location: Washington, Indiana
- Existed: yes

U.S. Route 50 Business (US 50 Bus.) was a business route of US 50 in the U.S. state of Indiana.

=== Bedford business loop ===
U.S. Route 50 Business
- Location: Bedford, Indiana
- Length: 2.8 mi (4.5 km)

U.S. Route 50 Business (US 50 Bus.) is a business route of US 50 in the U.S. state of Indiana.

== Ohio ==
=== Cincinnati bypass ===
U.S. Route 50 Bypass
- Location: Cleves to Milford, Ohio
- Existed: yes

U.S. Route 50 Bypass (US 50 Byp.) was a bypass of US 50 in the U.S. state of Ohio.

=== Cincinnati truck route ===
U.S. Route 50 Truck
- Location: Cincinnati, Ohio
- Existed: yes

U.S. Route 50 Truck (US 50 Truck) was a truck route of US 50 in the U.S. state of Ohio.

=== Athens—Ellenboro alternate route ===
U.S. Route 50 Alternate
- Location: Athens, Ohio—Ellenboro, West Virginia
- Existed: yes

U.S. Route 50 Alternate (US 50 Alt.) was an alternate route of US 50 in the U.S. states of Ohio and West Virginia. It followed a routing between Athens, Ohio and Ellenboro, West Virginia via Marietta, Ohio and St. Marys, West Virginia.

=== Belpre business loop ===
U.S. Route 50 Business
- Location: Belpre, Ohio
- Existed: yes

U.S. Route 50 Business (US 50 Bus.) was a business route of US 50 in the U.S. state of Ohio.

== West Virginia ==
=== Parkersburg business loop ===
U.S. Route 50 Business
- Location: Parkersburg, West Virginia
- Existed: yes

U.S. Route 50 Business (US 50 Bus.) was a business route of US 50 in the U.S. state of West Virginia.

== District of Columbia ==
=== Washington, D.C. alternate route ===
U.S. Route 50 Alternate
- Location: Washington, D.C.

U.S. Route 50 Alternate (US 50 Alt.) is an alternate route of US 50 in the District of Columbia.

=== Washington, D.C. bypass ===
U.S. Route 50 Bypass
- Location: Washington, D.C.
- Existed: yes

U.S. Route 50 Bypass (US 50 Byp.) was a bypass of US 50 in the District of Columbia.

=== Washington, D.C. temporary route ===
Temporary U.S. Route 50
- Location: District of Columbia–Maryland
- Existed: yes

U.S. Route 50 Temporary (US 50 Temp.) was a temporary route of US 50 in the District of Columbia and the U.S. state of Maryland.

== Maryland ==
=== Salisbury business loop ===
U.S. Route 50 Business
- Location: Salisbury, Maryland
- Length: 6.88 mi (11.07 km)
- Existed: 2002–present
- Tourist routes: Chesapeake Country Scenic Byway

U.S. Route 50 Business (US 50 Business) is a business route of U.S. Route 50 in the U.S. state of Maryland. The highway runs 6.88 miles (11.07 km) from US 50 on the northwest side of Salisbury to US 13 and US 50 on the east side of Salisbury in central Wicomico County. US 50 Business is a four- to six-lane divided highway within and on either side of the central business district of Salisbury, where the highway intersects MD 349, US 13 Business, and MD 346. US 50 Business west of MD 349 is a mid-1950s upgrade of the original highway entering Salisbury from the northwest. The business route between MD 349 and MD 346 was a relocation of US 50 from Main Street built in the early 1960s. East of MD 346, US 50 Business is part of the relocation of US 50 between Salisbury and Berlin completed in the mid-1960s. US 50 Business was designated when the US 50 portion of the Salisbury Bypass was completed in 2002.

== See also ==
- List of special routes of the United States Numbered Highway System
