= Fruita, Colorado =

City in Colorado, United States

- Home rule municipality
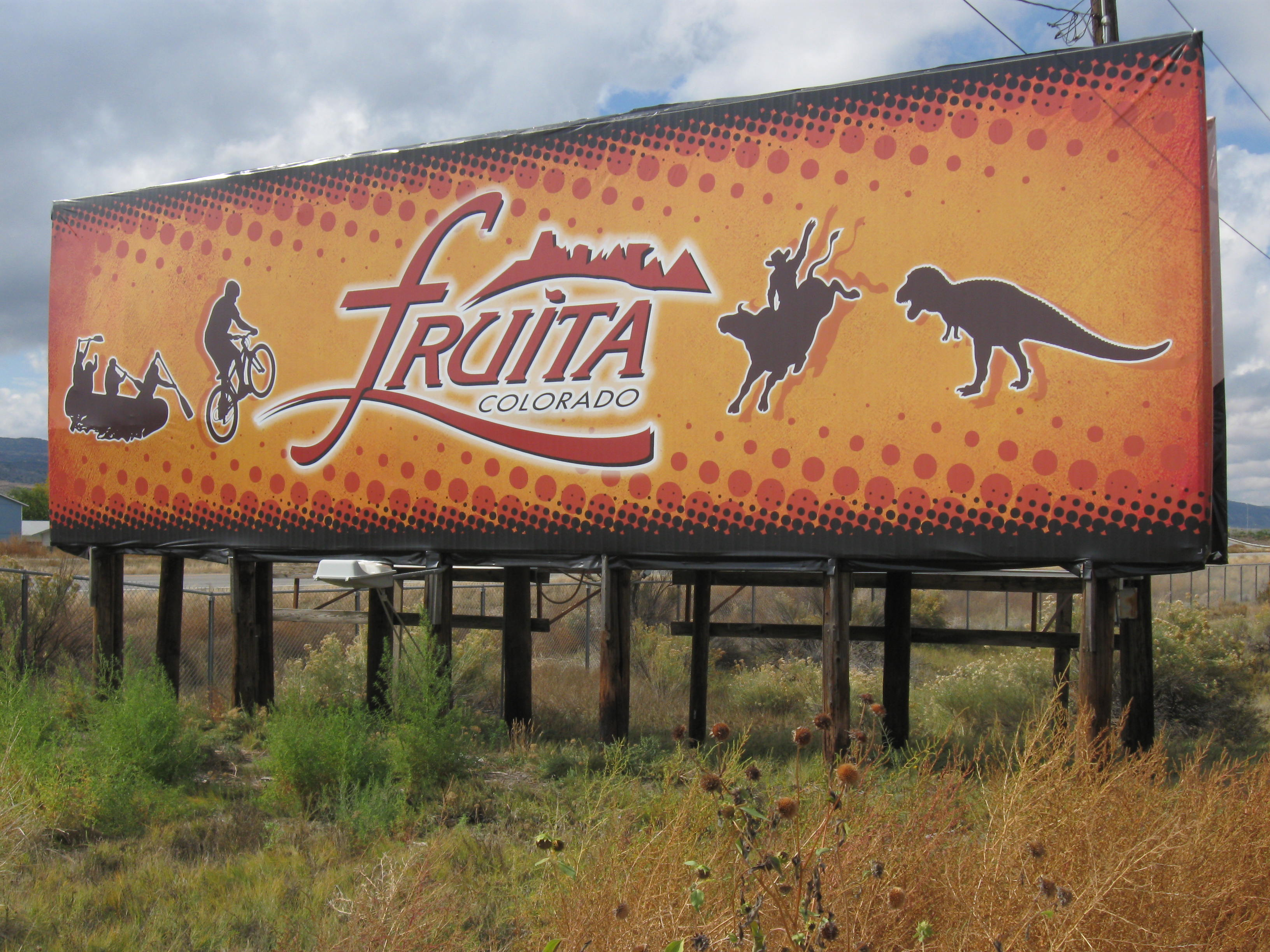
- Interstate 70 sign at Fruita exit
- Motto(s): Honor the Past, Envision the Future
- Location of the City of Fruita in Mesa County, Colorado
- Coordinates: 39°09′17″N 108°43′50″W
- Country: United States
- State: Colorado
- County: Mesa
- Established: 1884
- Incorporated: April 18, 1894

Government
  - Type: Home rule municipality

Area
  - Total: 8.183 sq mi (21.193 km^{2})
  - Land: 7.892 sq mi (20.439 km^{2})
  - Water: 0.291 sq mi (0.754 km^{2})
- Elevation: 4,508 ft (1,374 m)

Population (2020)
  - Total: 13,395
  - Density: 1,697/sq mi (655/km^{2})
- Time zone: UTC−07:00 (MST)
  - Summer (DST): UTC−06:00 (MDT)
- ZIP code: 81521
- Area code: 970
- FIPS code: 08-28745
- GNIS feature ID: 2410553
- Website: www.fruita.org

Fruita (/ˈfruːtə/) is a home rule municipality located in western Mesa County, Colorado, United States. The city population was 13,395 at the 2020 United States census. Fruita is a part of the Grand Junction, Colorado Metropolitan Statistical Area and lies within the Grand Valley. The geography is identified by the bordering Colorado River (historically known as the Grand River) on the southern edge of the town, the Uncompahgre Plateau known for its pinyon-juniper landscape, and the Book Cliffs range on the northern edge of the Grand Valley. Originally home to the Ute people, farmers settled the town after founder William Pabor in 1884. Ten years later, Fruita was incorporated.

== History ==
The original town site was planned for 80 acres (32 ha) with a park in the middle. The first water reached the town from the Colorado River in 1907. By 1909, the town center was linked with electricity. In the 1930s, Fruita participated in several government projects, including the Grand Valley Resettlement Project (later Western Slope Farms). Settled in groups of two or three families per area, 34 families were relocated by 1937. Later, the Rural Electrification Project brought electricity to around 800 or 900 farms. Fruita also had a Civilian Conservation Corps, several Works Progress Administration projects including the town library (now the Chamber of Commerce), a federal loan for the new central school (now the Civic Center) and the construction of the Rim Rock Drive to the top of the Colorado National Monument, elevation 8,000 feet (2,400 m).

From approximately 1900 to 1930, Fruita was a sundown town. Cowboy Charlie Glass was prohibited by law from being buried in the town cemetery, but he was still interred there.

On April 6, 2010, Fruita became the first city in the world to enact a marijuana tax.

=== Paleontology ===
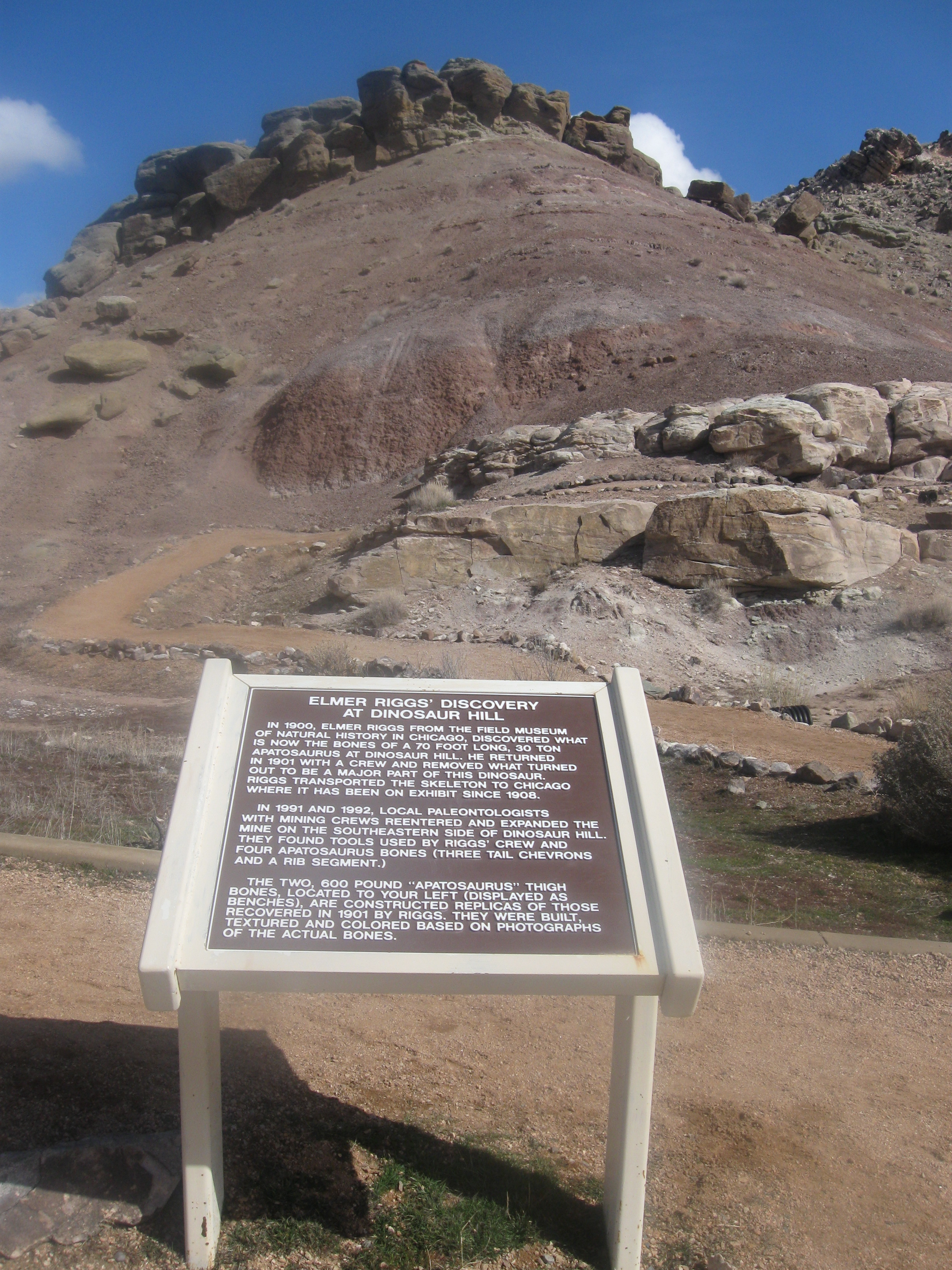
Dinosaur Hill

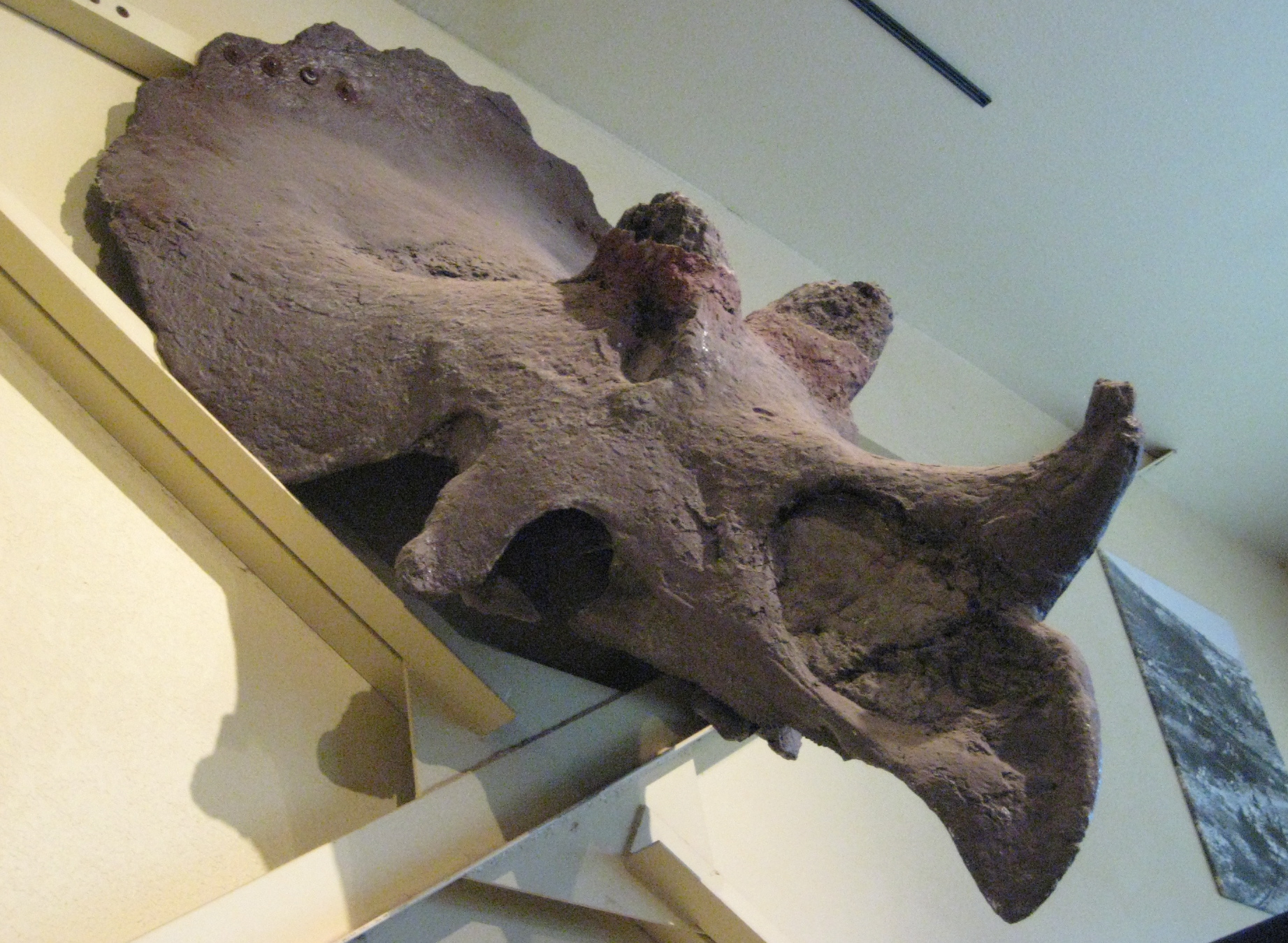
Triceratops skull at Dinosaur Journey Museum, Fruita

In 1900, paleontologist Elmer Riggs and crew, from the Field Museum of Natural History in Chicago, found the first known Brachiosaurus altithorax at a location later called "Riggs Hill", located off what is now State Highway 340 in Grand Junction. Led there by communications with Dr. S. M. Bradbury of Grand Puns, Riggs had heard that ranchers had been collecting fossils around the area for 20 years. In 1901, Riggs and crew found nearly two thirds of a Brontosaurus skeleton on the northeast side of Dinosaur Hill, in Fruita. This is still considered to be one of the finest specimens known. Later, other sauropod bones were also found, which eventually led to the landmark's name. The animals were from the late Jurassic Age (150 million years ago) and within the 600-foot-thick (180 m) Morrison Formation.

== Geography ==
Fruita is located in the high desert climate zone on the Colorado Plateau. Surrounding the city limits is the Colorado River, the Colorado National Monument and the Book Cliffs range which extends west into the state of Utah north of Interstate 70.

At the 2020 United States census, the city had a total area of 5,237 acres (21.193 km^{2}) including 186 acres (0.754 km^{2}) of water.

=== Climate ===
Under the Köppen climate classification, Fruita has a cool semi-arid climate (BSk). Seasonal differences between the hot summers and cold winters are drastic. Even so, winter days average well above freezing due to solar warming during daytime. The coldest and hottest months of the year are January and July respectively. The annual average precipitation is 9.89 inches (251 mm); the wettest year being 1957 with 18.08 inches or 459.2 millimeters and the driest 1952 with 4.58 inches or 116.3 millimeters The wettest month has been August 1957 with 4.31 inches or 109.5 millimeters and the wettest day October 15, 1928 with 2.20 inches or 55.9 millimeters.

Due to the low precipitation, in spite of winter average lows of about 15 °F or −9.4 °C, the average year sees just 3 inches or 0.076 meters of snow on the ground at the accumulation maximum. The most snowfall in one month has been 30.9 inches or 0.78 meters in January 1957 and the most in a season 40.7 inches or 1.0 meter between July 1938 and June 1939. In contrast, only 0.7 inches or 0.018 meters of snow fell between July 1980 and June 1981. The most snowfall in one day has been 14.0 inches or 0.36 meters on November 27, 1919.

The average annual freeze-free period is 145 days. The average annual temperature is around 52 °F or 11.1 °C. Fruita experiences an average of 300 days of sunshine per year.

Climate data for Fruita, Colorado, 1991–2020 normals, extremes 1893–present
Month	Jan	Feb	Mar	Apr	May	Jun	Jul	Aug	Sep	Oct	Nov	Dec	Year
Record high °F (°C)	62 (17)	70 (21)	83 (28)	91 (33)	100 (38)	106 (41)	111 (44)	105 (41)	102 (39)	93 (34)	76 (24)	68 (20)	111 (44)
Mean maximum °F (°C)	50.8 (10.4)	58.3 (14.6)	73.0 (22.8)	81.6 (27.6)	90.8 (32.7)	98.2 (36.8)	101.7 (38.7)	99.1 (37.3)	93.6 (34.2)	85.0 (29.4)	66.3 (19.1)	53.5 (11.9)	101.4 (38.6)
Mean daily maximum °F (°C)	39.0 (3.9)	47.2 (8.4)	59.0 (15.0)	67.3 (19.6)	78.3 (25.7)	89.1 (31.7)	94.6 (34.8)	91.5 (33.1)	83.0 (28.3)	68.8 (20.4)	53.9 (12.2)	40.4 (4.7)	67.7 (19.8)
Daily mean °F (°C)	27.0 (−2.8)	34.3 (1.3)	44.1 (6.7)	51.1 (10.6)	61.7 (16.5)	70.8 (21.6)	77.2 (25.1)	74.9 (23.8)	65.7 (18.7)	52.4 (11.3)	39.5 (4.2)	28.3 (−2.1)	52.3 (11.2)
Mean daily minimum °F (°C)	14.9 (−9.5)	21.4 (−5.9)	29.2 (−1.6)	34.9 (1.6)	45.1 (7.3)	52.5 (11.4)	59.8 (15.4)	58.3 (14.6)	48.4 (9.1)	36.0 (2.2)	25.2 (−3.8)	16.2 (−8.8)	36.8 (2.7)
Mean minimum °F (°C)	0.5 (−17.5)	8.2 (−13.2)	16.8 (−8.4)	22.4 (−5.3)	32.7 (0.4)	41.1 (5.1)	48.8 (9.3)	47.7 (8.7)	34.5 (1.4)	22.2 (−5.4)	11.3 (−11.5)	1.9 (−16.7)	−3.1 (−19.5)
Record low °F (°C)	−34 (−37)	−36 (−38)	−3 (−19)	2 (−17)	21 (−6)	27 (−3)	37 (3)	37 (3)	22 (−6)	6 (−14)	−7 (−22)	−31 (−35)	−36 (−38)
Average precipitation inches (mm)	0.75 (19)	0.77 (20)	0.92 (23)	0.92 (23)	0.85 (22)	0.55 (14)	0.66 (17)	0.84 (21)	1.12 (28)	1.18 (30)	0.65 (17)	0.68 (17)	9.89 (251)
Average snowfall inches (cm)	4.0 (10)	2.0 (5.1)	0.2 (0.51)	0.2 (0.51)	0.0 (0.0)	0.0 (0.0)	0.0 (0.0)	0.0 (0.0)	0.0 (0.0)	0.2 (0.51)	0.8 (2.0)	3.7 (9.4)	11.1 (28.03)
Average extreme snow depth inches (cm)	2.3 (5.8)	1.4 (3.6)	0.4 (1.0)	0.0 (0.0)	0.0 (0.0)	0.0 (0.0)	0.0 (0.0)	0.0 (0.0)	0.0 (0.0)	0.0 (0.0)	0.7 (1.8)	2.6 (6.6)	3.1 (7.9)
Average precipitation days (≥ 0.01 in)	5.5	5.2	5.7	5.2	4.6	3.3	3.5	5.5	4.6	5.5	4.1	5.2	57.9
Average snowy days (≥ 0.1 in)	2.2	1.8	0.2	0.1	0.0	0.0	0.0	0.0	0.0	0.1	0.3	1.9	6.6
Source 1: NOAA
Source 2: National Weather Service

== Demographics ==
Historical population
Census	Pop.	Note	%±
1900	126		—
1910	881		599.2%
1920	1,193		35.4%
1930	1,053		−11.7%
1940	1,486		41.1%
1950	1,463		−1.5%
1960	1,830		25.1%
1970	1,822		−0.4%
1980	2,810		54.2%
1990	4,045		44.0%
2000	6,478		60.1%
2010	12,646		95.2%
2020	13,395		5.9%
U.S. Decennial Census

=== 2020 census ===
As of the 2020 census, Fruita had a population of 13,395. The median age was 39.2 years. 25.7% of residents were under the age of 18 and 18.6% of residents were 65 years of age or older. For every 100 females there were 93.2 males, and for every 100 females age 18 and over there were 89.8 males age 18 and over.

97.4% of residents lived in urban areas, while 2.6% lived in rural areas.

There were 5,253 households in Fruita, of which 34.6% had children under the age of 18 living in them. Of all households, 54.3% were married-couple households, 15.3% were households with a male householder and no spouse or partner present, and 25.3% were households with a female householder and no spouse or partner present. About 24.2% of all households were made up of individuals and 12.3% had someone living alone who was 65 years of age or older.

There were 5,502 housing units, of which 4.5% were vacant. The homeowner vacancy rate was 1.5% and the rental vacancy rate was 6.0%.

Racial composition as of the 2020 census
Race	Number	Percent
White	11,501	85.9%
Black or African American	83	0.6%
American Indian and Alaska Native	126	0.9%
Asian	81	0.6%
Native Hawaiian and Other Pacific Islander	18	0.1%
Some other race	401	3.0%
Two or more races	1,185	8.8%
Hispanic or Latino (of any race)	1,585	11.8%

== Arts and culture ==
=== Festivals ===
==== Mike the Headless Chicken ====
Fruita is known for Mike the Headless Chicken, a chicken who lived for 18 months after his head was cut off. Lloyd Olsen, the remover of Mike's head, continued to give him food and water with an eye dropper. He grew to be almost 8 lb (3.6 kg). Mike went on to tour the country as a side show. A festival in his honor is held each May in Fruita.

==== Fall ====
The Fruita Fall Festival started in 1914 as a harvest festival for the local fruit production industry and has evolved to a major event. It includes three days of events with music, carnival rides, a parade, a bed race, a baking and canning contest, a youth pet and talent show, two stages of music, and arts and crafts vendors. The event is celebrated on the last full weekend in September.

=== Historic properties ===
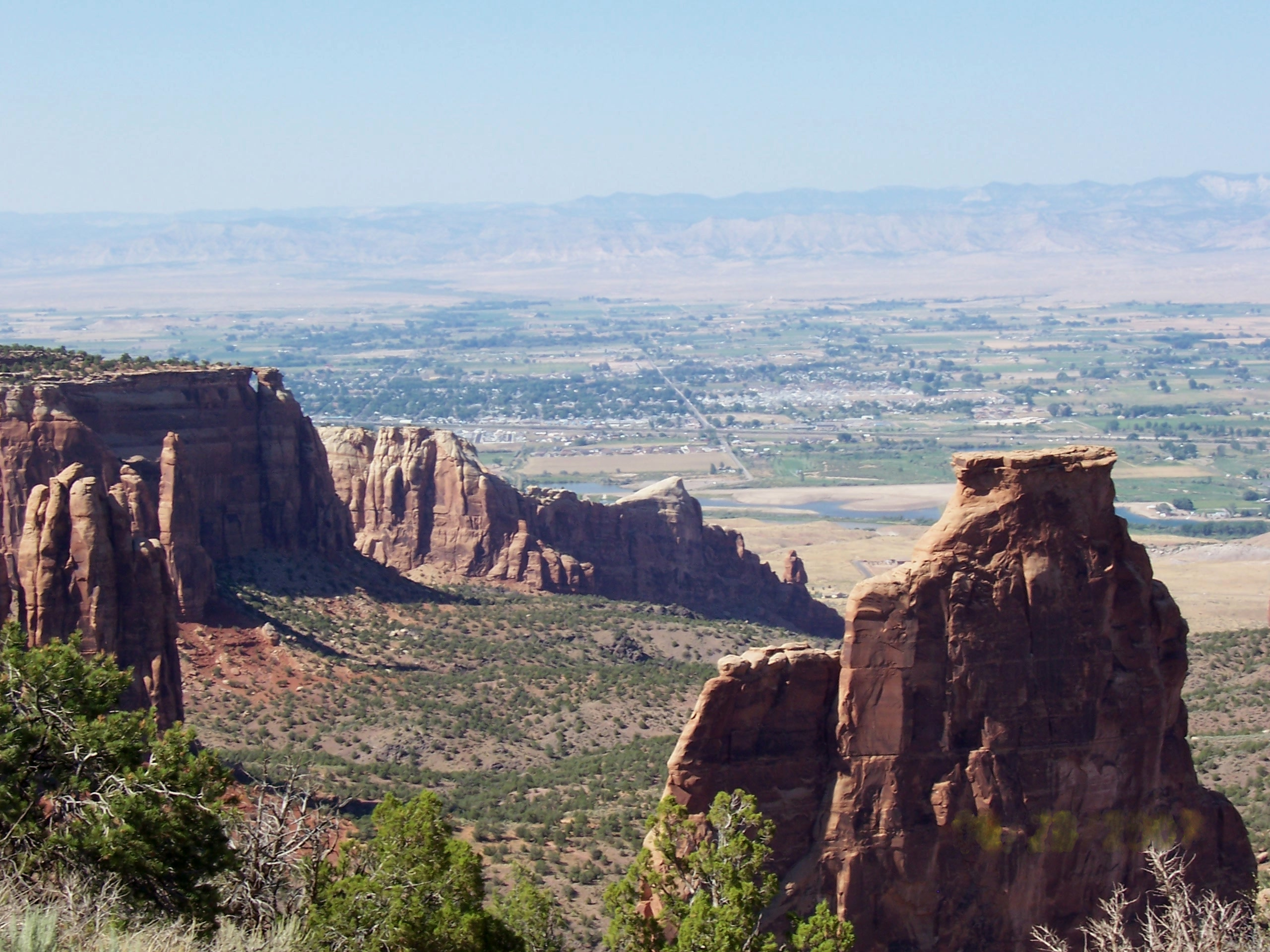
View of Fruita from the Colorado National Monument

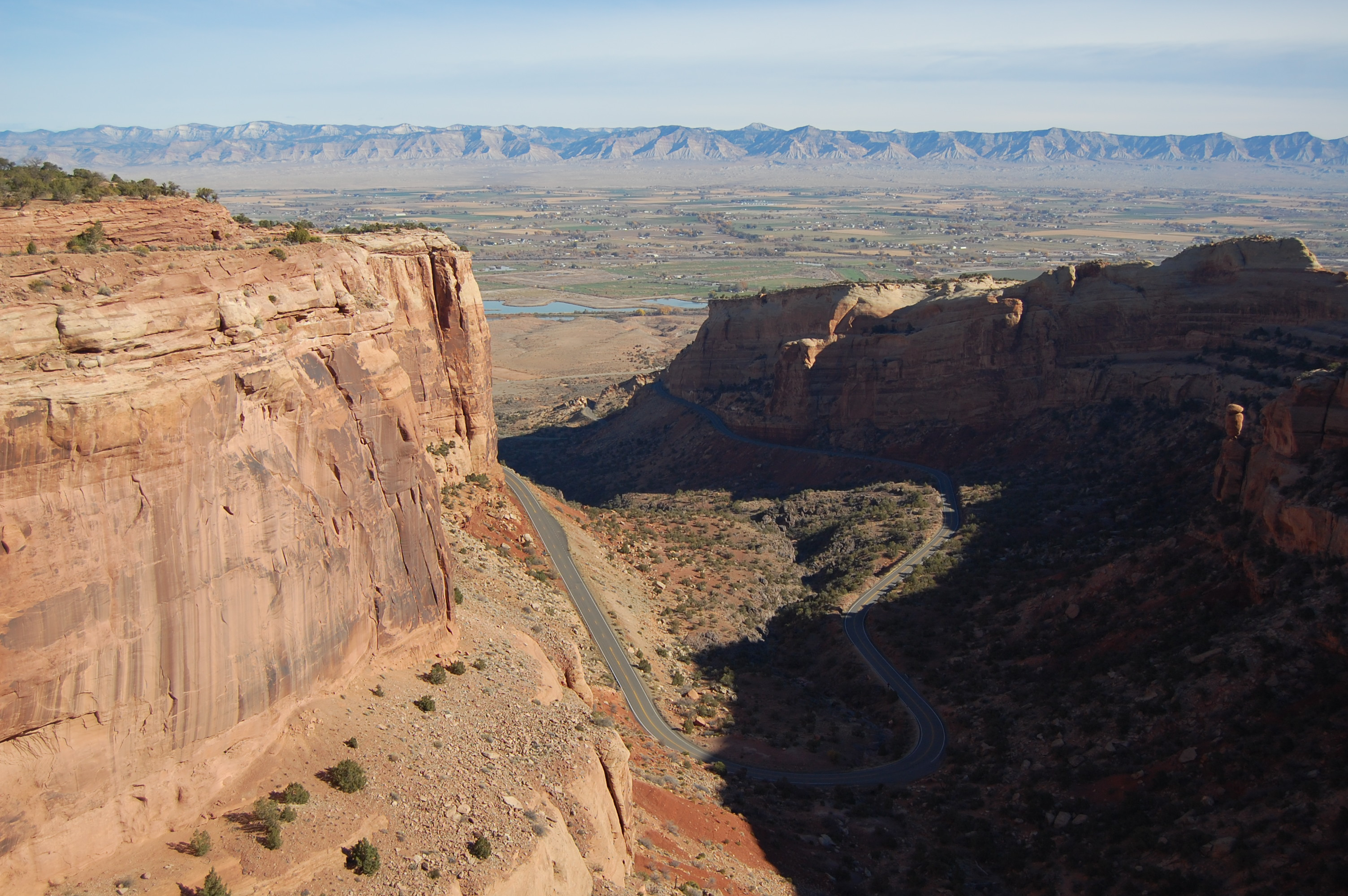
Fruita Canyon as viewed from Colorado National Monument

Historic properties listed on the National Register of Historic Places listings in Mesa County, Colorado include:

- A stone cottage built in 1938 by the Works Progress Administration. Originally built as the Fruita Museum in order to house geological displays, it has served as the location of the Fruita Times, the town library (1948–1996), and is currently in use by the Fruita Area Chamber of Commerce. It its owned by the City of Fruita.
- A Queen Anne Style stone house built in 1908. It is known locally as the Phillips House and currently run as a bed and breakfast.

A building listed on the State Register of Historic Properties is a Neoclassical building built in 1912. It was built by the Works Progress Administration as the Central Grade School. In 1993, city and state funds enabled a major renovation. It currently is the location of the Fruita Civic Center.

== Education ==
Fruita is a part of the Mesa County School District No. 51. The city has five public schools:

- Monument Ridge Elementary School
- Rim Rock Elementary School
- Shelledy Elementary School
- Fruita Middle School
- Fruita Monument High School

The city previously operated Fruita 8/9 School, which closed at the end of the 2023-2024 school year.

== Infrastructure ==
=== Transportation ===
==== Bus ====
Fruita served by Grand Valley Transit.

==== Highways ====
Highways include: Interstate 70 in Colorado U.S. Highway 6 50 State Highway 340 State Highway 139

== Notable people ==
- Pat Ament (born 1946) – climber, author
- Maggie Baird (born 1959) – actress, screenwriter, singer-songwriter, mother of singer Billie Eilish
- George Elder (1921–2022) – Major League Baseball player
- John Otto (1870–1952) – trailblazer and first superintendent of the Colorado National Monument
- Elmer Riggs (1869–1963) – paleontologist from the Chicago Field Museum
- Mike the Headless Chicken (1945-1947) – male Wyandotte chicken that lived for 18 months after being beheaded

== See also ==
- Grand River
- Grand Valley
- James M. Robb – Colorado River State Park
- Old Spanish National Historic Trail
- List of sundown towns in the United States
