= Baculite Mesa =

Mountain in Colorado, United States

Coordinates: 38°23′31.47″N 104°33′18.94″W

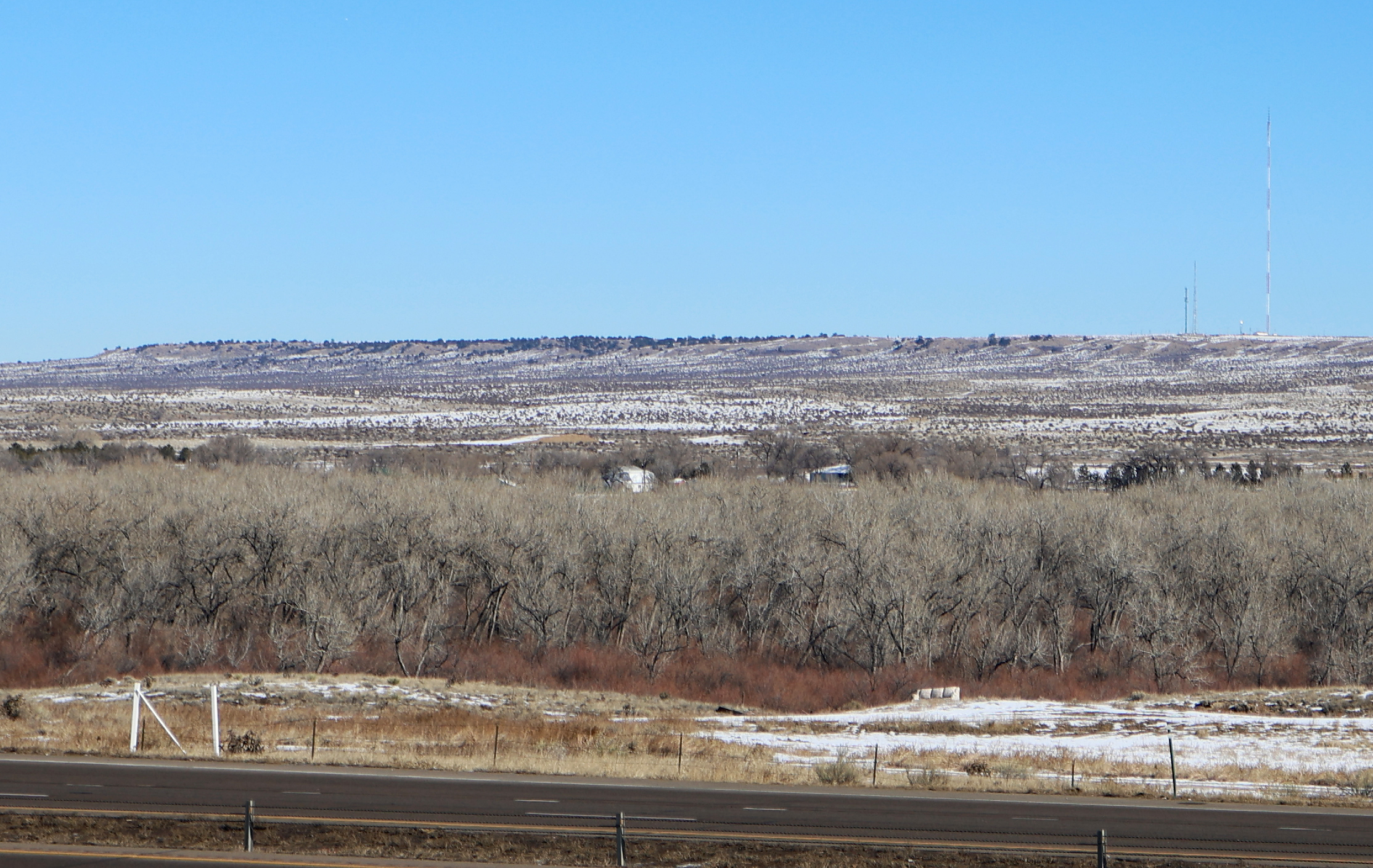
Baculite Mesa (west aspect, northern section)

Baculite Mesa, elevation 5,394 feet (1,644 meters), lies about five miles (eight kilometers) northeast of the city of Pueblo in Pueblo County, Colorado, U.S.

The mesa is named for the Baculites fossils found there. It is a popular site for fossil hunters, especially academic groups, but almost all the mesa is on private land, so permission is required to access it. The mesa is part of the Pierre Shale Formation.
