= Salt Creek, Colorado =

Census-designated place in Pueblo County, CO, USA

Salt Creek, Colorado Barrio Salado
- Census-designated place
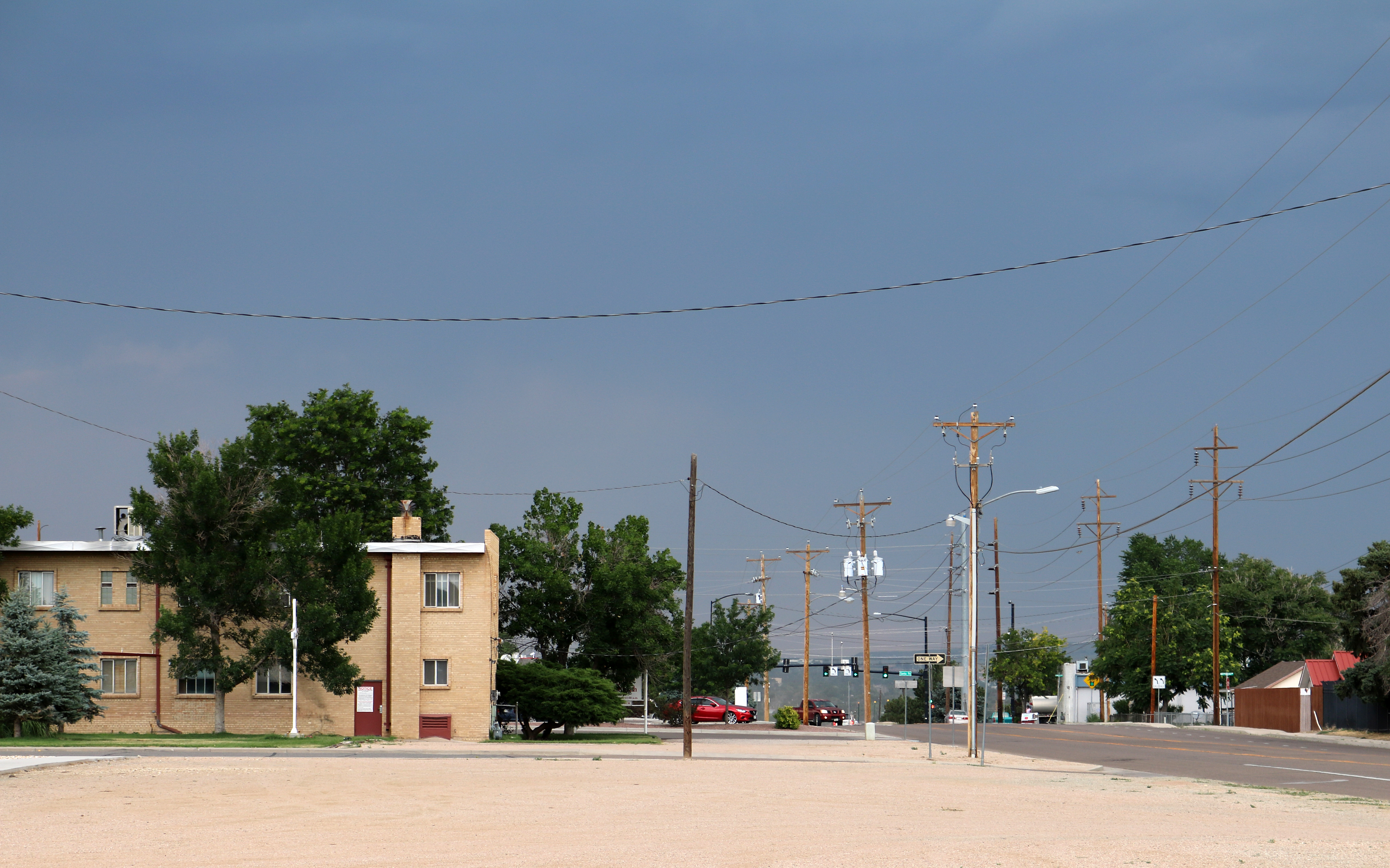
- Looking north along South Aspen Road towards Santa Fe Drive in Salt Creek, July 2017.

- Location of the Salt Creek CDP in Pueblo County, Colorado
- Coordinates: 38°14′27″N 104°35′12″W
- Country: United States
- State: Colorado
- County: Pueblo County

Government
  - Type: Unincorporated community

Area
  - Total: 0.432 sq mi (1.119 km^{2})
  - Land: 0.432 sq mi (1.119 km^{2})
  - Water: 0 sq mi (0.000 km^{2})
- Elevation: 4,738 ft (1,444 m)

Population (2020)
  - Total: 507
  - Density: 1,170/sq mi (453/km^{2})
- Time zone: UTC-7 (MST)
  - Summer (DST): UTC-6 (MDT)
- ZIP Code: Pueblo 81006
- Area code: 719
- GNIS feature ID: 2409241

Salt Creek is an unincorporated community and a census-designated place (CDP) located in and governed by Pueblo County, Colorado, United States. The CDP is a part of the Pueblo, CO Metropolitan Statistical Area. The population of the Salt Creek CDP was 507 at the United States Census 2020. The Pueblo post office (Zip Code 81006) serves the area. The community takes its name from Salt Creek, a stream that flows on the community's west side.

== Geography ==
The Salt Creek CDP has an area of 277 acres (1.119 km^{2}), all land. The neighborhood is also called Barrio Salado.

== Demographics ==
The United States Census Bureau initially defined the Salt Creek CDP for the United States Census 2000.

Salt Creek CDP, Colorado
Year	Pop.	±%
2000	648	—
2010	587	−9.4%
2020	507	−13.6%
Source: United States Census Bureau

== Education ==
It is in Pueblo School District 60.

== See also ==
- Front Range Urban Corridor
- South Central Colorado Urban Area
- Pueblo, CO Metropolitan Statistical Area
