= Baxter, Colorado =

Unincorporated community in Pueblo County, Colorado, United States

- Unincorporated community
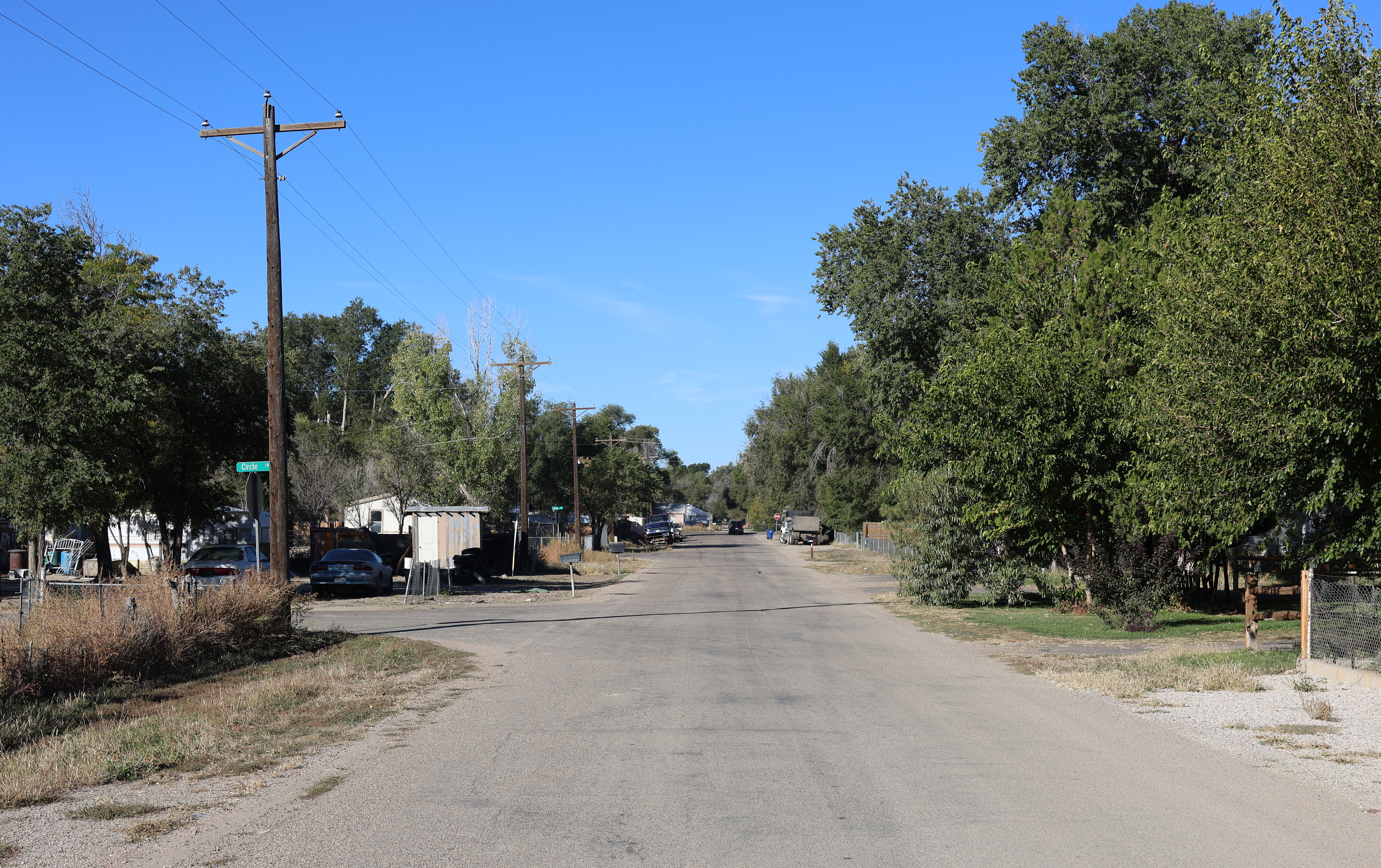
- Looking west along Aldred Road in Baxter. (2023)

- Location of Baxter, Colorado. Baxter (Colorado)
- Coordinates: 38°16′27″N 104°29′45″W
- Country: United States
- State: Colorado
- County: Pueblo

Government
  - Type: Unincorporated community
  - Body: Pueblo County
- Elevation: 4,607 ft (1,404 m)
- Time zone: UTC−07:00 (MST)
  - Summer (DST): UTC−06:00 (MDT)
- GNIS pop ID: 203691

Baxter is an unincorporated community in Pueblo County, in the U.S. state of Colorado.

The community has the name of O.H.P. Baxter, a local settler. Baxter has never had a post office.

== See also ==
- Front Range Urban Corridor
- Pueblo, CO Metropolitan Statistical Area
