= Olathe, Colorado =

Town in Montrose County, Colorado, United States

- Town
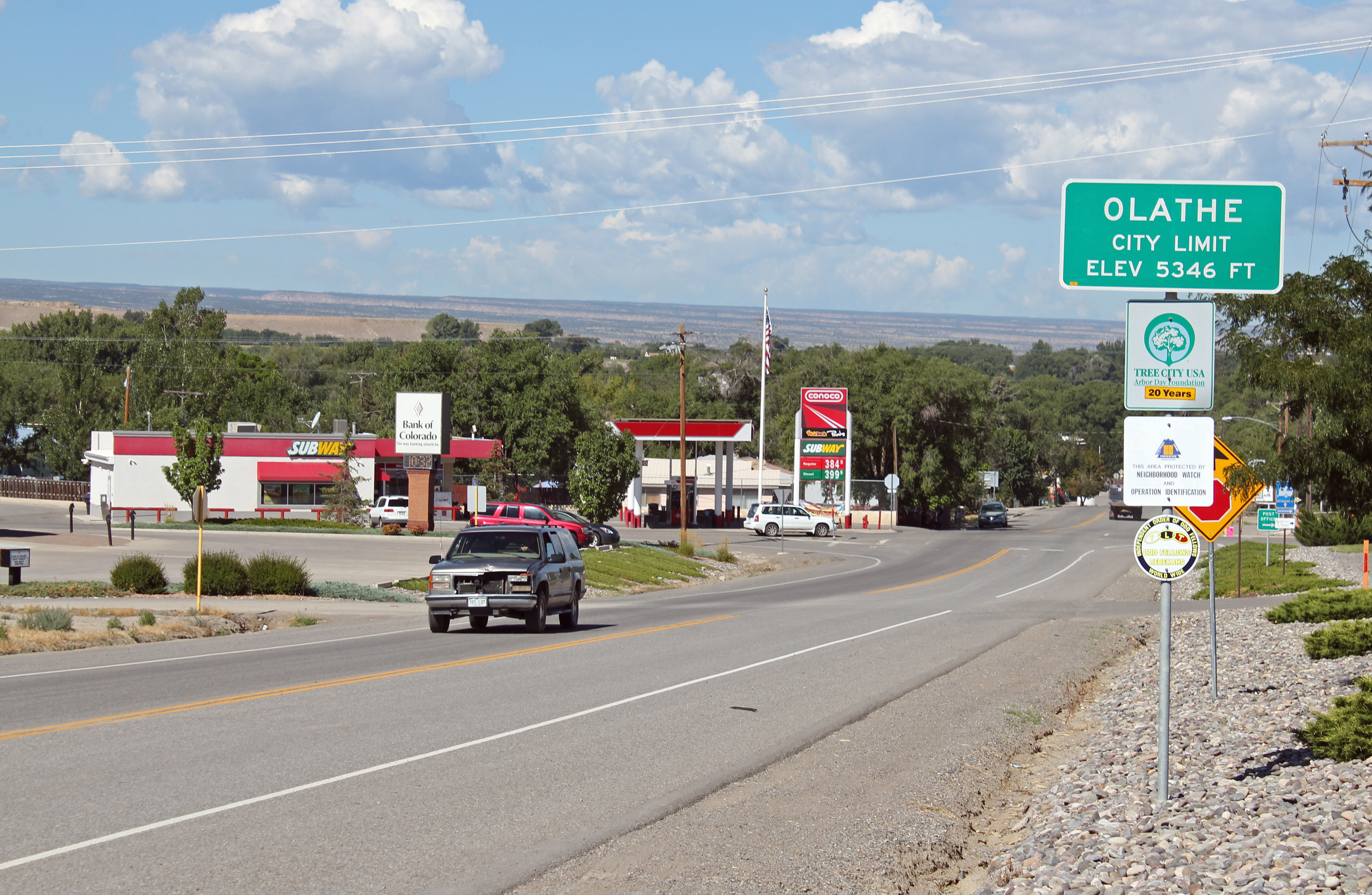
- Olathe in 2014

- Location in Montrose County, Colorado
- Coordinates: 38°37′04″N 107°59′14″W
- Country: United States
- State: Colorado
- County: Montrose
- Incorporated (town): October 16, 1907

Government
  - Type: Statutory town

Area
  - Total: 1.50 sq mi (3.89 km^{2})
  - Land: 1.50 sq mi (3.89 km^{2})
  - Water: 0 sq mi (0.00 km^{2})
- Elevation: 5,358 ft (1,633 m)

Population (2020)
  - Total: 2,019
- Time zone: UTC-7 (Mountain (MST))
  - Summer (DST): UTC-6 (MDT)
- ZIP code: 81425
- Area code: 970
- FIPS code: 08-55540
- GNIS feature ID: 2413078
- Website: www.townofolathe.org

Olathe is a statutory town in Montrose County, Colorado, United States. The population was 2,019 as of the 2020 census, up from 1,849 at the 2010 census.

== History ==
Olathe was originally named Brown. The Brown, Colorado, post office opened on April 2, 1883, but was renamed Olathe on June 4, 1896. The community was named after Olathe, Kansas.

== Geography ==
Olathe is located in northeastern Montrose County in the valley of the Uncompahgre River. U.S. Route 50 passes through the east side of the town, leading southeast 10 miles (16 km) to Montrose, the county seat, and northwest 11 miles (18 km) to Delta.

At the 2020 United States census, the town had a total area of 1.5 square miles (3.9 km^{2}), all of it land. The Uncompahgre River passes along the western edge of the town, flowing northwest to the Gunnison River at Delta. Ash Mesa rises 100 feet (30 m) over the town to the west.

== Demographics ==
Historical population
Census	Pop.	Note	%±
1910	458		—
1920	491		7.2%
1930	593		20.8%
1940	705		18.9%
1950	810		14.9%
1960	773		−4.6%
1970	756		−2.2%
1980	1,262		66.9%
1990	1,263		0.1%
2000	1,573		24.5%
2010	1,849		17.5%
2020	2,019		9.2%
U.S. Decennial Census

=== 2020 census ===
As of the 2020 census, Olathe had a population of 2,019. The median age was 34.9 years. 25.5% of residents were under the age of 18 and 14.7% of residents were 65 years of age or older. For every 100 females there were 104.8 males, and for every 100 females age 18 and over there were 110.3 males age 18 and over.

0.0% of residents lived in urban areas, while 100.0% lived in rural areas.

There were 558 households in Olathe, of which 43.4% had children under the age of 18 living in them. Of all households, 48.4% were married-couple households, 19.5% were households with a male householder and no spouse or partner present, and 26.2% were households with a female householder and no spouse or partner present. About 25.5% of all households were made up of individuals and 12.4% had someone living alone who was 65 years of age or older.

There were 617 housing units, of which 9.6% were vacant. The homeowner vacancy rate was 1.9% and the rental vacancy rate was 6.9%.

Racial composition as of the 2020 census
Race	Number	Percent
White	954	47.3%
Black or African American	11	0.5%
American Indian and Alaska Native	28	1.4%
Asian	3	0.1%
Native Hawaiian and Other Pacific Islander	3	0.1%
Some other race	649	32.1%
Two or more races	371	18.4%
Hispanic or Latino (of any race)	1,144	56.7%

=== 2000 census ===
As of the census of 2000, there were 1,573 people, 520 households, and 383 families residing in the town. The population density was 1,186.8 inhabitants per square mile (458.2/km^{2}). There were 571 housing units at an average density of 430.8 units per square mile (166.3 units/km^{2}). The racial makeup of the town was 74.44% White, 0.06% African American, 1.65% Native American, 0.32% Asian, 19.71% from other races, and 3.81% from two or more races. Hispanic or Latino of any race were 35.22% of the population.

There were 520 households, out of which 41.5% had children under the age of 18 living with them, 59.0% were married couples living together, 10.2% had a female householder with no husband present, and 26.3% were non-families. 22.9% of all households were made up of individuals, and 11.7% had someone living alone who was 65 years of age or older. The average household size was 2.88 and the average family size was 3.44.

In the town, the population was spread out, with 31.8% under the age of 18, 10.1% from 18 to 24, 24.7% from 25 to 44, 19.3% from 45 to 64, and 14.0% who were 65 years of age or older. The median age was 31 years. For every 100 females, there were 95.2 males. For every 100 females age 18 and over, there were 87.1 males.

The median income for a household in the town was $26,286, and the median income for a family was $31,354. Males had a median income of $22,708 versus $18,077 for females. The per capita income for the town was $12,620. About 15.9% of families and 21.8% of the population were below the poverty line, including 24.7% of those under age 18 and 19.6% of those age 65 or over.

== Transportation ==
The closest airport served by scheduled airlines is Montrose Regional Airport, located 9 miles (14 km) southeast of Olathe.

=== Major highways ===
- U.S. Route 50 (US 50) runs east–west, crossing 12 states. It links Sacramento, California with Ocean City, Maryland. In Colorado, it connects Olathe to Montrose, Grand Junction and Pueblo. US 50 has a business loop within the town.
- State Highway 348 is mostly a country road running parallel to US 50. It starts at Fifth Street in Olathe, goes to the countryside and enters Delta via 8th Street/Eaton Avenue.

== Attractions ==
=== Olathe Sweet Corn Festival ===
Since 1992, this annual town festival has been held the first Saturday in August each summer, dedicated to the region's "agricultural jewel", Olathe Sweet Corn. The Festival features such entertainment as craft shows, karaoke, local acts, such as the Anders Brothers, Cabin Fever Band, and concerts by bigger names like Three Dog Night in 1996, Kansas in 1998, Styx in 2004, LeAnn Rimes in 2007, Travis Tritt in 2008, and Clint Black in 2009. In 2019, the festival was moved to Montrose to accommodate larger crowds, and in 2024 the festival garnered additional sponsors and moved permanently to Montrose.

=== Olathe BMX ===
Olathe BMX was established by the Town of Olathe in 2007 and sanctioned by the American Bicycle Association. Olathe BMX is run by volunteers; self-supporting since its conception in 2007, Olathe BMX has produced several state champions.

== Education ==
Olathe is part of the Montrose County School District RE-1J and has three schools within the town limits. Olathe Elementary School has a population of around 500 students and supports grades K through 5. The middle school and high school are attached and create Olathe Middle High School.

== See also ==
- Sweet corn
- Old Spanish National Historic Trail
