= List of U.S. Highways in Colorado =

U.S. Highways in Colorado
- Standard highway markers for U.S. Highway 6, U.S. Highway 40 and U.S. Highway 160
- U.S. Highways in Colorado highlighted in red

Highway names
- US Highways: U.S. Highway X (US X)

System links
- Colorado State Highway System; Interstate; US; State; Scenic

The U.S. Highways in Colorado are the segments of the national United States Numbered Highway System that are owned and maintained by the state of Colorado. The longest of these highways is U.S. Highway 160 (US 160), which spans 497.223 miles (800.203 km) across southern Colorado. The standards and numbering for the system are handled by the American Association of State Highway and Transportation Officials (AASHTO) while the routes in the state are maintained by the Colorado Department of Transportation (CDOT).

== Mainline highways ==
Number	Length (mi)	Length (km)	Southern or western terminus	Northern or eastern terminus	Formed	Removed	Notes
US 6	467.284	752.021	I-70/US 6/US 50 near Mack	US 6 near Holyoke	1931	current	
US 24	277.319	446.302	I-70 near Minturn	US 24 near Burlington	1936	current	
US 34	259.529	417.671	US 40 in Granby	US 34 near Wray	1939	current	
US 36	224.718	361.649	US 34 at Deer Ridge in Rocky Mountain National Park	US 36 near Idalia	1926	current	
US 38	—	—	Greeley	US 38 at the Nebraska state line	1926	1931	Became part of US 6 and US 34
US 40	486.924	783.628	US 40 west of Dinosaur	US 40 east of Arapahoe	1926	current	
US 40N	—	—	US 40 in Limon	US 40N at the Kansas state line	1926	c. 1935	Became part of US 24
US 40S	—	—	US 40N in Limon	Grand Junction	1926	c. 1935	Became parts of US 24 and US 40
US 50	467.583	752.502	I-70/US 6/US 50 near Grand Junction	US 50/US 400 near Holly	1926	current	
US 84	27.924	44.939	US 160 near Pagosa Springs	US 84 near Chromo	1941	current	
US 85	309.542	498.160	I-25/US 85/US 87 near Trinidad	US 85 near Eaton	1926	current	
US 87	298.879	480.999	I-25/US 85/US 87 near Trinidad	I-25/US 87	1936	current	Entirely concurrent with Interstate 25 within the state.
US 138	59.823	96.276	US 6 near Sterling	US 138 near Julesburg	1926	current	Orphan route. Was a spur of US 38 before it became part of US 6.
US 160	497.223	800.203	US 160 near Teec Nos Pos, Arizona	US 160 near Walsh	c. 1930	current	Original western terminus was Trinidad. Extended via US 85 and US 450 to near Dove Creek in 1934. Rerouted west of Cortez via US 164 in 1970 toward Four Corners Monument.
US 164	40.290	64.840	US 164 near Four Corners Monument	Cortez	1964	1970	Became part of US 160 west of Cortez
US 285	263.947	424.782	US 285 near Antonito	I-25 in Denver	1936	current	Originally terminated on Alameda Ave. at US 85/US 87. In 1969, rerouted to terminate at US 40 (Colfax Ave.) in Aurora. Truncated at I-25 in Denver in 1979.
US 287	385.223	619.956	US 287/US 385 near Campo	US 287 near Virginia Dale	1935	current	
US 350	72.718	117.028	US 160 near Walsenburg	US 50 in La Junta	c. 1926	current	
US 385	317.631	511.178	US 287/US 385 near Campo	US 385 near Julesburg	1958	current	
US 400	14.814	23.841	US 50/US 385 in Granada	US 50/US 400 near Coolidge, Kansas	1996	current	Entirely concurrent with US 50 within the state
US 450	—	—	US 450 at the Utah state line	US 85/US 87 in Walsenburg	—	1939	Now US 491 north of Cortez and US 160 from Cortez to Walsenburg
US 491	69.602	112.014	US 491 north of Shiprock, New Mexico	US 491 north of Dove Creek	2003	current	Formerly US 666
US 550	130.219	209.567	US 550 near Durango	US 50 in Montrose	1926	current	
US 650	—	—	—	—	c. 1927	1936	Now SH 291 through Salida and US 285 south of Buena Vista
US 666	69.602	112.014	US 666 north of Shiprock, New Mexico	US 666 north of Dove Creek	c. 1926	2003	Now US 491
US 789	—	—	New Mexico state line	Wyoming state line	—	—	Proposed, but never commissioned; would have followed (south to north): US 666, US 160, US 550, US 6/US 24, SH 13
Former

== Special routes ==
Number	Length (mi)	Length (km)	Southern or western terminus	Northern or eastern terminus	Formed	Removed	Notes
US 6 Byp.	—	—	—	—	—	—	Served Colorado Junction
US 24 Bus.	—	—	Manitou Springs	Colorado Springs	—	—	
US 34 Bus.	—	—	—	—	—	—	Serves Estes Park
US 34 Bus.	—	—	—	—	—	—	Serves Greeley
US 34 Bus.	—	—	—	—	—	—	Served Brush
Temp. US 40	—	—	Steamboat Springs	Kremmling	—	—	
US 50 Bus.	—	—	Pueblo	Avondale	—	—	
US 50 Bus.	—	—	—	—	—	—	Serves Olathe
US 85 Byp.	—	—	Fountain	Colorado Springs	—	—	
US 85 Bus.	—	—	—	—	—	—	Serves Brighton
US 85 Bus.	—	—	—	—	—	—	Serves Fort Lupton
US 85 Bus.	—	—	—	—	—	—	Serves Platteville
US 85 Bus.	—	—	—	—	—	—	Serves Greeley
Temp. US 87	—	—	—	—	—	—	Served Denver
US 160 Bus.	—	—	—	—	—	—	Serves Mancos
US 160 Bus.	—	—	—	—	—	—	Serves Durango
US 160 Bus.	—	—	—	—	—	—	Serves Bayfield
US 350 Byp.	—	—	—	—	—	—	Serves Trinidad
US 550 Bus.	—	—	—	—	—	—	Serves Durango
Former
