= Colorado State Highway 394 =

State highway in Moffat County, Colorado, United States

State Highway 394
- SH 394 highlighted in red

Route information
- Maintained by CDOT
- Length: 9.378 mi (15.092 km)
- Existed: c. 1949–present

Major junctions
- West end: US 40 / SH 13 in Craig
- East end: CR 65 at Routt County line

Location
- Country: United States
- State: Colorado
- Counties: Moffat

Highway system
- Colorado State Highway System; Interstate; US; State; Scenic
← SH 392	→ SH 402

State Highway 394 (SH 394) is a 9.378 mi (15.092 km) state highway in Moffat County, Colorado, United States. SH 394's western terminus is at U.S. Route 40/Colorado State Highway 13 (US 40/SH 13) in Craig, and the eastern terminus is at the Moffat–Routt county line.

== Route description ==
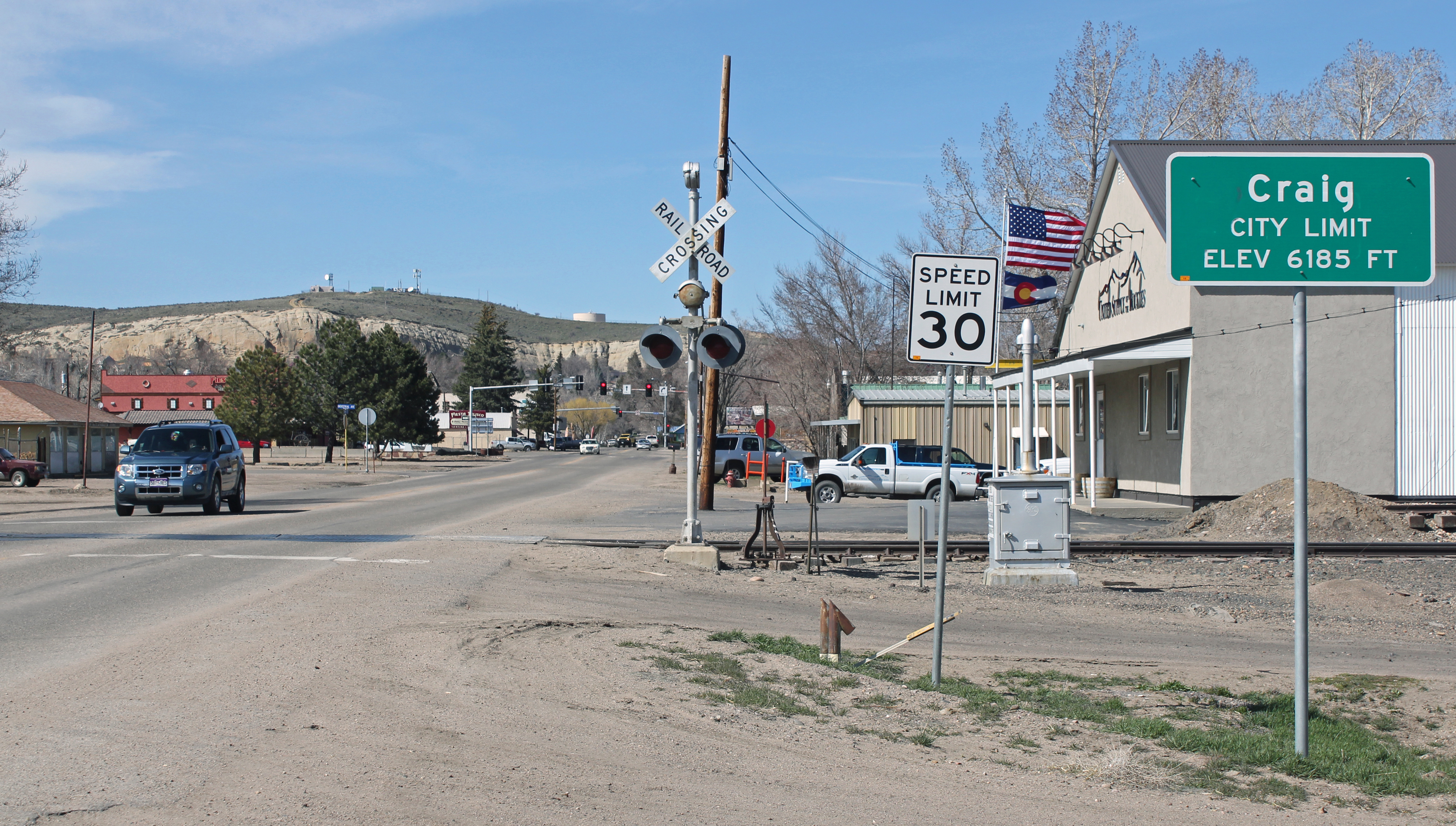
North along SH 394 as it enters Craig, April 2014

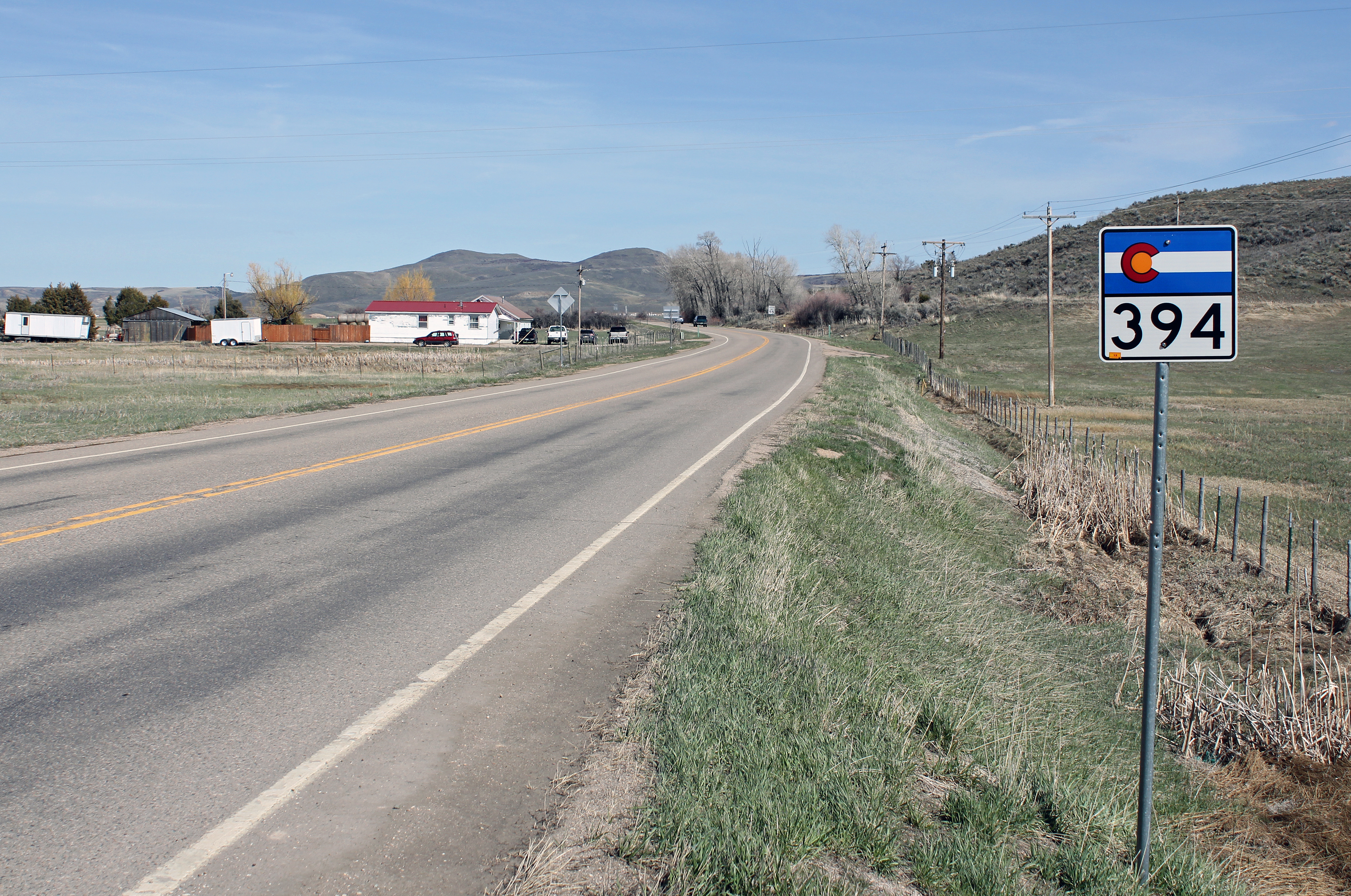
Looking east near where SH 394 turns east south of Craig, April 2014

SH 394 begins in Craig at the intersection of Ranney Street and West Victory Way (carrying westbound US 40/SH 13). From its western terminus SH 394 proceeds south on Ranney Street for one block before crossing the eastbound direction of the US 40/SH 13 one-way pair that runs along West 4th Street. About another block south, the highway crosses a set of railroad tracks and leaves the city limits of Craig.

About 0.7 miles (1.1 km) south of Craig, after another railroad crossing, SH 394 crosses over the Yampa River. Roughly 0.3 miles (0.48 km) farther south the highway turns east at an intersection with County Road 107 (CR 107), which continues south, on the southern edge of a small oxbow lake of the Yampa River. East of CR 107, SH heads easterly, roughly parallel US 40.

After heading easterly for about 5.5 miles (8.9 km) and immediately after a junction with County Road 100, SH 394 turns south and (as of September 2008) the pavement ends shortly thereafter. After heading southerly for roughly 1.4 miles (2.3 km), at a T intersection with County Road 113 (which continues south), the highway turns to head easterly for about another 1.1 miles (1.8 km). The highway ends at the county line between Moffat County and Routt County, southeast of Dresher Reservoir. The road continues easterly from SH 394's western terminus as County Road 65 in Routt County to rejoin US 40 in Hayden.

== Major intersections ==
The entire route is in Moffat County.

Location	mi	km	Destinations	Notes
Craig	0.000	0.000	Ranney Street – north	Continuation north of western terminus
Craig	0.000	0.000	US 40 west / SH 13 south (West Victory Way) – Maybell, Meeker, Dinosaur	Western terminus; one-way westbound road
Craig	0.124	0.200	US 40 east / SH 13 north (West 4th Street) – Hayden, Baggs (Wyoming), Steamboat Springs, Creston Junction (I-80 in Wyoming)	One-way eastbound road
			Bridge over the Yampa River	
	9.378	15.092	Moffat–Routt county line	Eastern terminus
	9.378	15.092	CR 65 east – Hayden	Continuation east (into Routt County) beyond eastern terminus
1.000 mi = 1.609 km; 1.000 km = 0.621 mi

== See also ==
- List of state highways in Colorado
