= Colorado State Highway 300 =

State highway in Lake County, Colorado, United States

State Highway 300
- SH 300 highlighted in red

Route information
- Maintained by CDOT
- Length: 3.356 mi (5.401 km)

Major junctions
- West end: Leadville National Fish Hatchery
- East end: US 24 southwest of Leadville

Location
- Country: United States
- State: Colorado
- Counties: Lake

Highway system
- Colorado State Highway System; Interstate; US; State; Scenic
← SH 291	→ SH 317

State Highway 300 (SH 300) is a 3.356-mile (5.401 km) state highway in Lake County, Colorado, United States, that connects the Leadville National Fish Hatchery with U.S. Route 24 (US 24) southeast of Leadville.

== Route description ==
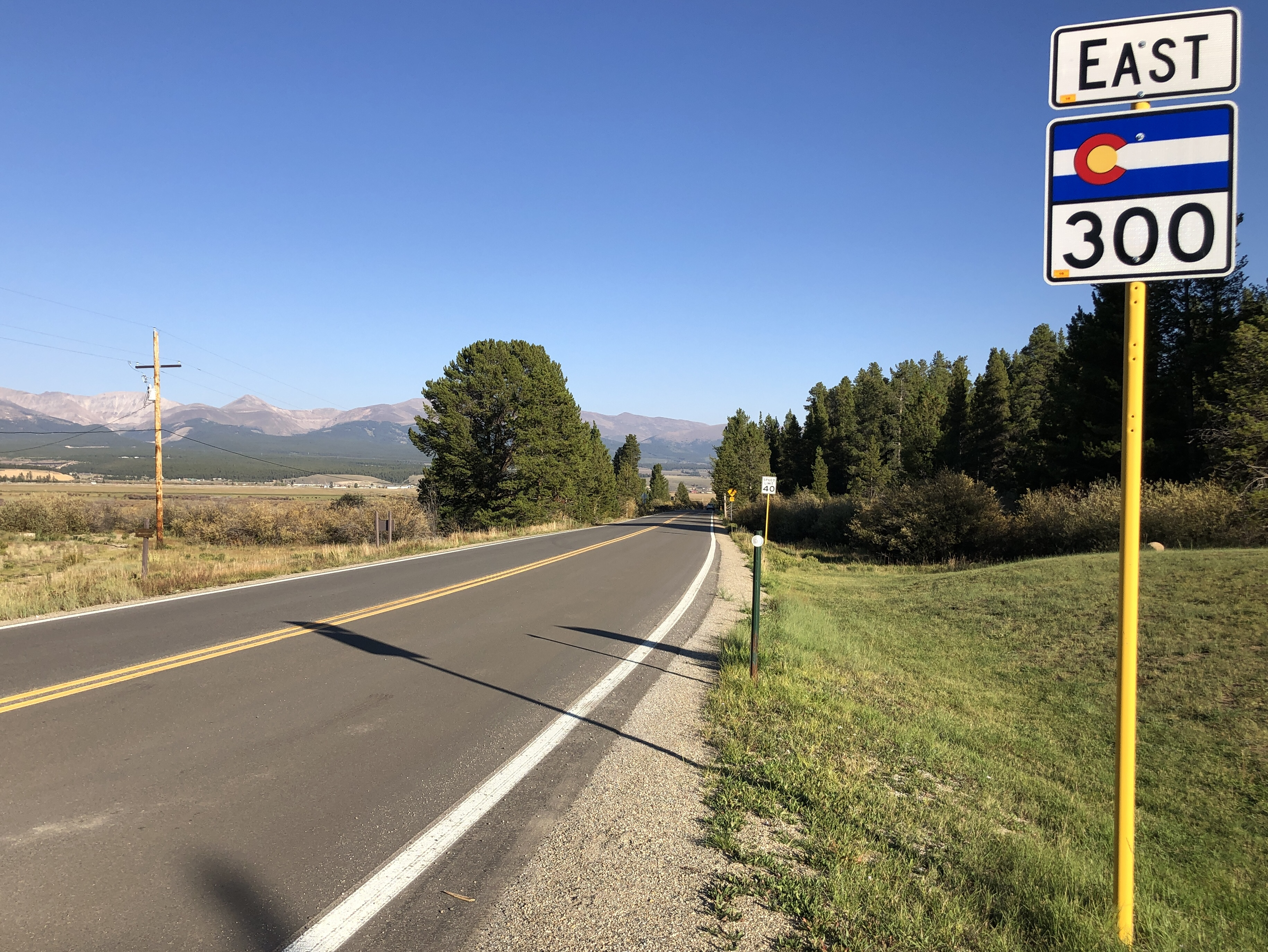
Eastbound on along SH 300 at the Leadville National Fish Hatchery, September 2022

SH 300 begins at the Leadville National Fish Hatchery. From its western terminus, it actually heads very briefly west, before turning to a southerly course for about 1.1 miles (1.8 km). The highway then runs east for the remaining 1.9 miles (3.1 km) of its route, crossing the Arkansas River just before reaching its eastern terminus. SUH 300 ends at a T intersection with US 24, southeast of Leadville. (US 24 heads north to Leadville and south to Buena Vista.)

== Major intersections ==
The entire route is in Lake County.

Location	mi	km	Destinations	Notes
	0.000	0.000	CR 5A east (County Road 5A)	East beyond western terminus
	0.000	0.000	Leadville National Fish Hatchery	Western terminus
	3.356	5.401	US 24 north – Leadville, I-70 US 24 south – Buena Vista, Poncha Springs	Eastern terminus;T intersection
1.000 mi = 1.609 km; 1.000 km = 0.621 mi

== See also ==
- List of state highways in Colorado
