= Colorado State Highway 317 =

State highway in Colorado, United States

State Highway 317
- SH 317 highlighted in red

Route information
- Maintained by CDOT
- Length: 12.237 mi (19.694 km)

Major junctions
- West end: SH 13 in Hamilton
- East end: CR 29 near the Routt County line

Location
- Country: United States
- State: Colorado
- Counties: Moffat, Routt

Highway system
- Colorado State Highway System; Interstate; US; State; Scenic
← SH 300	→ SH 318

State Highway 317 (SH 317) is a 12.237-mile-long (19.694 km) state highway in the US state of Colorado. The western terminus is at SH 13 in Hamilton, and the eastern terminus is at Routt County Route 29 (CR 29).

== Route description ==
SH 317 runs 12.2 miles (19.6 km), starting at a junction with SH 13 in Hamilton. The highway follows the Williams Fork River to the east and ends at a junction with CR 29 just over the Routt County line.

== Major intersections ==
County	Location	mi	km	Destinations	Notes
Moffat	Hamilton	0.000	0.000	SH 13 – Meeker, Craig	Western terminus
Routt		12.237	19.694	CR 29	Eastern terminus
1.000 mi = 1.609 km; 1.000 km = 0.621 mi
