= Colorado State Highway 291 =

State highway in Colorado, United States

State Highway 291
- SH 291 highlighted in red

Route information
- Maintained by CDOT
- Length: 9.135 mi (14.701 km)

Major junctions
- South end: US 50 in Salida
- North end: US 285 north of Poncha Springs

Location
- Country: United States
- State: Colorado
- Counties: Chaffee

Highway system
- Colorado State Highway System; Interstate; US; State; Scenic
← US 287	→ SH 300

State Highway 291 (SH 291) is a 9.135-mile (14.701 km) state highway in Chaffee County, Colorado, United States, that connects U.S. Route 50 (US 50) in Salida with U.S. Route 285 (US 285) north of Poncha Springs.

== Route description ==
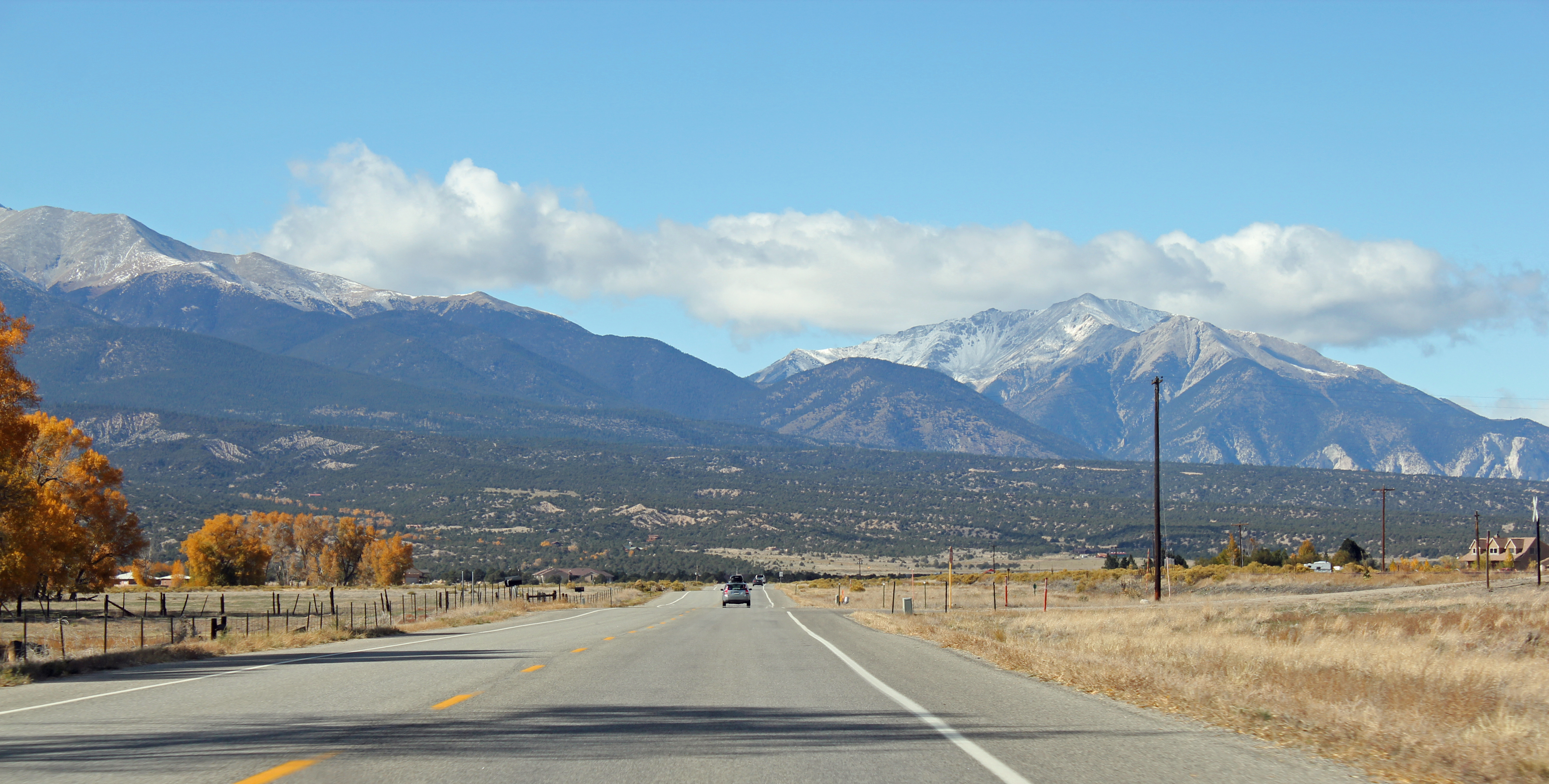
Westbound on SH 291 near its northern terminus at U.S. Route 285, October 2011

SH 291 begins at a T intersection with US 50 in Salida. From it southern terminus, it travels north as Oak Street. It then turns northwest to become 1st Street as it passes through Salida's historic downtown, paralleling the Arkansas River. The highway continues northwest, crossing the Arkansas River twice and ending at a junction with US 285 at a T intersection, about 7.6 miles (12.2 km) north of Pancho Springs.

== Major intersections ==
The entire route is in Chaffee County.

Location	mi	km	Destinations	Notes
Salida	0.000	0.000	US 50 east – Cañon City, Pueblo, Colorado Springs US 50 west (East Rainbow Boulevard) – Gunnison, Monte Vista	Southern terminus, T intersection
	9.135	14.701	US 285 north – Buena Vista, Fairplay, Leadville US 285 north – Poncha Springs, Saguache	Northern terminus; T intersection
1.000 mi = 1.609 km; 1.000 km = 0.621 mi

== Sed also ==
- List of state highways in Colorado
