= Tolland =

Tolland is the name of some places:

in Australia

- Tolland, New South Wales

in the UK

- Tolland, Somerset

in the USA

- Tolland, Colorado
- Tolland, Connecticut
- Tolland, Massachusetts
- Tolland County, Connecticut
