= Colorado State Highway 318 =

State highway in Colorado, United States

State Highway 318
- SH 318 highlighted in red

Route information
- Maintained by CDOT
- Length: 60.597 mi (97.521 km)

Major junctions
- West end: Brown's Park Road at the Utah state line near Browns Park
- East end: US 40 in Maybell

Location
- Country: United States
- State: Colorado
- Counties: Moffat

Highway system
- Colorado State Highway System; Interstate; US; State; Scenic
← SH 317	→ SH 325

State Highway 318 (SH 318) is a state highway in Moffat County, Colorado. SH 318's western terminus is at Brown's Park Road at the Utah state line, and the eastern terminus is at U.S. Route 40 (US 40) in Maybell.

== Route description ==
SH 318 runs 60.7 miles (97.7 km), starting north of the Green River in an isolated area known as Browns Park. It connects at the Utah state line with gravel surfaced Brown's Park Road. The highway runs southeast, passing Browns Park National Wildlife Refuge and continuing southeast when the Green River turns south into Dinosaur National Monument. The highway crosses Vermillion Creek, the Little Snake River and the Yampa River before ending at a junction with US 40 in Maybell.

== Major intersections ==
The entire route is in Moffat County.

Location	mi	km	Destinations	Notes
	0.000	0.000	Brown's Park Road (CR 1364)	Continuation into Utah; to US 191
Maybell	60.697	97.682	US 40 – Craig, Dinosaur	Eastern terminus
1.000 mi = 1.609 km; 1.000 km = 0.621 mi

== See also ==
- List of state highways in Colorado
