= Colorado State Highway 13 =

State highway in Colorado, United States

State Highway 13
- Map of northwestern Colorado with SH 13 highlighted in red

Route information
- Maintained by CDOT
- Length: 128.00 mi (206.00 km)

Major junctions
- South end: I-70 in Rifle
- US 6 in Rifle; US 40 in Craig
- North end: WYO 789 near Baggs, WY

Location
- Country: United States
- State: Colorado
- Counties: Garfield, Rio Blanco, Moffat

Highway system
- Colorado State Highway System; Interstate; US; State; Scenic
← SH 12	→ SH 14

State Highway 13 (SH 13) in the U.S. state of Colorado is a north–south mountain route that travels from Rifle to the Wyoming border near Baggs, Wyoming, through the Rocky Mountains.

== Route description ==
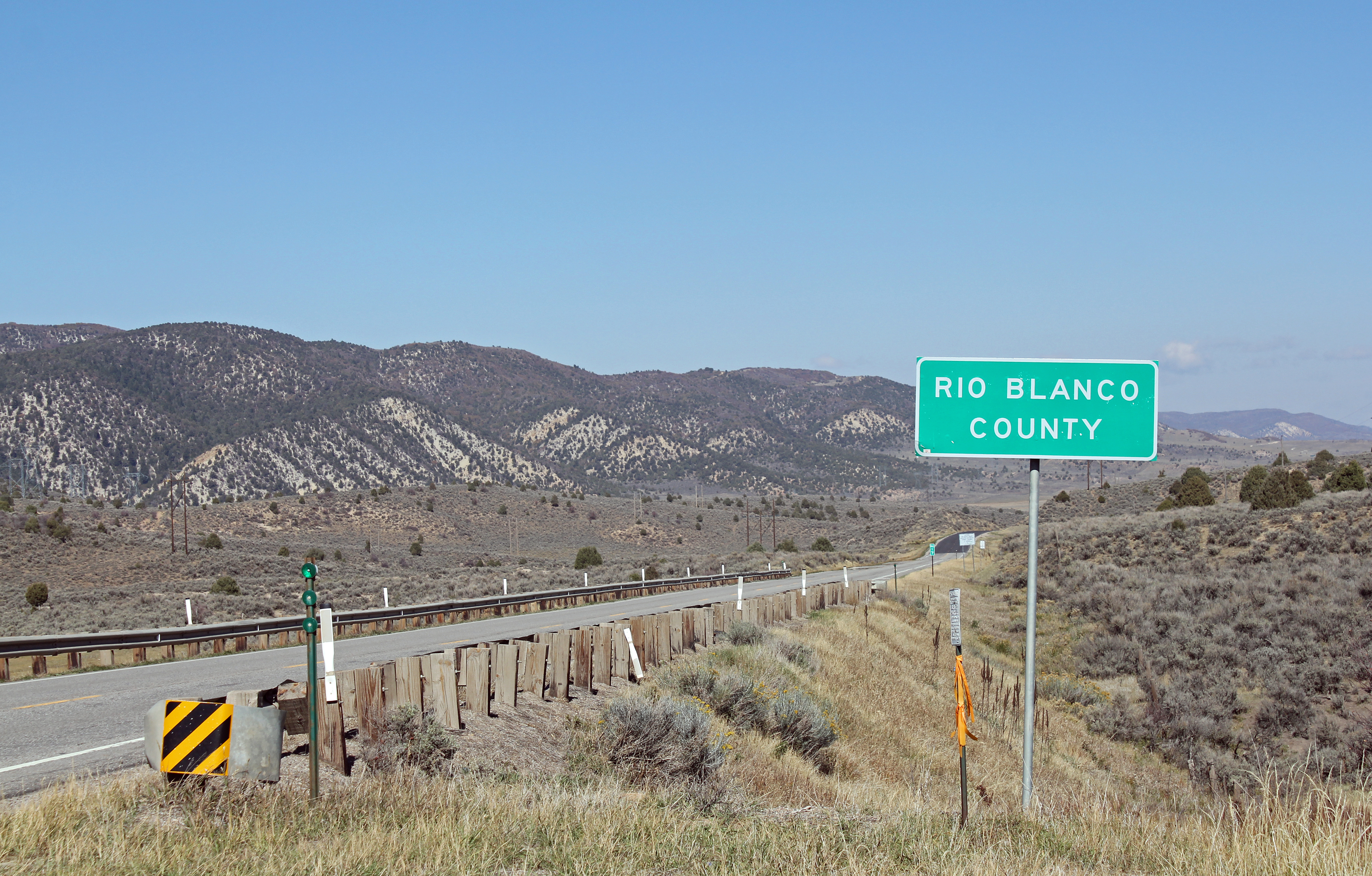
North on SH 13 as it enters Rio Blanco County, October 2012

The route begins at a diamond interchange with Interstate 70 south of Rifle. It then crosses the Colorado River and intersects U.S. Highway 6 at the south side of Rifle. Along the north side of town the road turns slightly northeastward as it passes through the northern Rifle and into grassland, where it intersects State Highway 325. As the road turns back northward and then slightly northwestward, the surrounding terrain turns into a more barren land dotted with occasional shrubs and grass. As the road continues northwestward, the shrubs and trees become more dense along hillsides. SH 13 then crosses into Rio Blanco County, when the direction becomes straight north. SH 13 then interchanges with State Highway 64, which meets its east end here, and turns abruptly eastward. SH 13 then becomes Market Street as it cuts through the south side of Meeker, paralleling the White River. Following an intersection with a local road leading to Meeker Airport, the road again turns northward back into rural Rio Grande County.

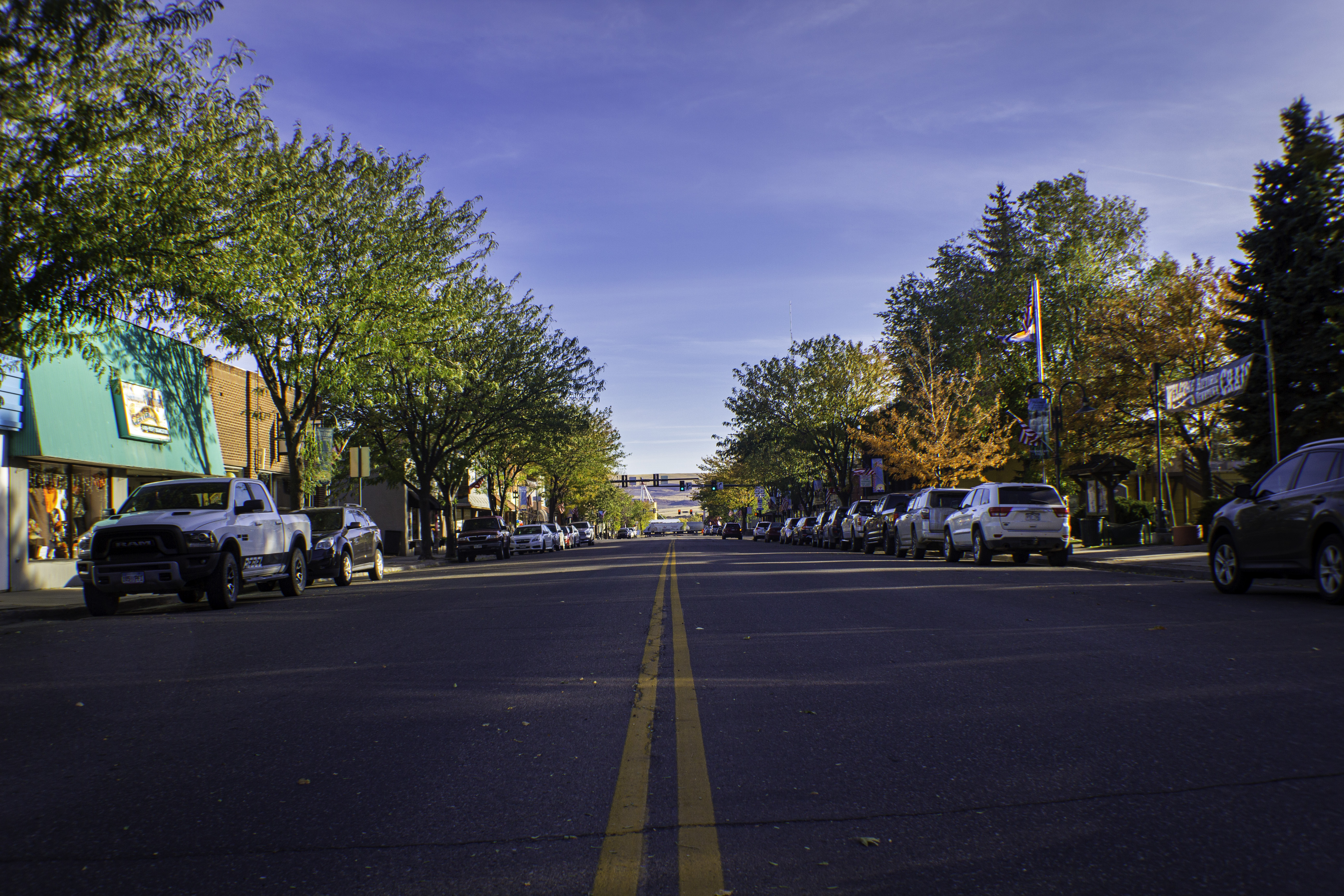
South on SH 13 (Yampa Avenue) in Craig, October 2019

Following several miles of barren land north of Meeker, SH 13 exits the White River Valley and enters mountainous terrain. The road then follows the Good Springs Creek valley to the Moffat county line. SH 13 continues through rural Moffat County and gradually turns eastward and again northward after several miles. Near Hamilton, the route's next destination, the road meets State Highway 317 and turns slightly northwestward. After a distance winding through barren land, the road reaches Craig, where it meets U.S. Highway 40 and begins a short concurrency through the city. Following the overlap SH 13 again moves northward, out of town and along the Fortification Creek valley. Here fields, are located along the road, moving northwestward. Eventually, after moving along several miles of road through farmland, the road reaches the Wyoming state line. The road continues as Wyoming Highway 789 to Baggs.

== History ==
The route was established in the 1920s and was paved by 1947. Minor changes corrected the route to its current routing today by 1985.

SH 13 was once cosigned as SH 789.

== Major intersections ==
County	Location	mi	km	Destinations	Notes
Garfield	Rifle	0.000	0.000	Airport Road / Taughenbaugh Boulevard / South 7th Street	Roundabout; southern terminus; Airport Rd. serves Grand River Health and Garfield County Regional Airport
Garfield	Rifle	0.117	0.188	I-70 – Denver, Grand Junction	Partial dumbbell interchange; I-70 exit 90
Garfield	Rifle	0.222	0.357	Lions Park Circle – Visitor Info, Rest Area	North end of state maintenance
Garfield	Rifle	0.545	0.877	US 6 east (Centennial Parkway)	Southern end of US 6 concurrency
Garfield	Rifle	1.059	1.704	US 6 west to I-70 west – Grand Junction	South end of state maintenance; northern end of US 6 concurrency
Garfield		4.114	6.621	SH 325 north – Rifle Falls, Rifle Mountain Park	Southern terminus of SH 325
Rio Blanco		39.010	62.781	SH 64 west – Rangely	Eastern terminus of SH 64
Moffat	Hamilton	75.793	121.977	SH 317 east – Pagoda	Western terminus of SH 317
Moffat	Craig	88.635 89.322	142.644 143.750	US 40 west – Vernal, Salt Lake	South end of US 40 overlap; mileposts change to reflect US 40 mileage
Moffat	Craig	90.531	145.696	SH 394 (Ranney Street)	Northern terminus of SH 394; server Craig–Moffat Airport
Moffat	Craig	90.838 89.58	146.190 144.17	US 40 east (E. 4th Street)	One-way street, outbound access only; mileposts change to reflect SR 13 mileage
Moffat	Craig	89.706	144.368	US 40 (Victory Way)	One-way street, inbound access only; north end of US 40 overlap
Moffat		127.999	205.994	WYO 789 north	Continuation into Wyoming
1.000 mi = 1.609 km; 1.000 km = 0.621 mi: Concurrency terminus
