= Denver and Salt Lake Railway =

Transport company

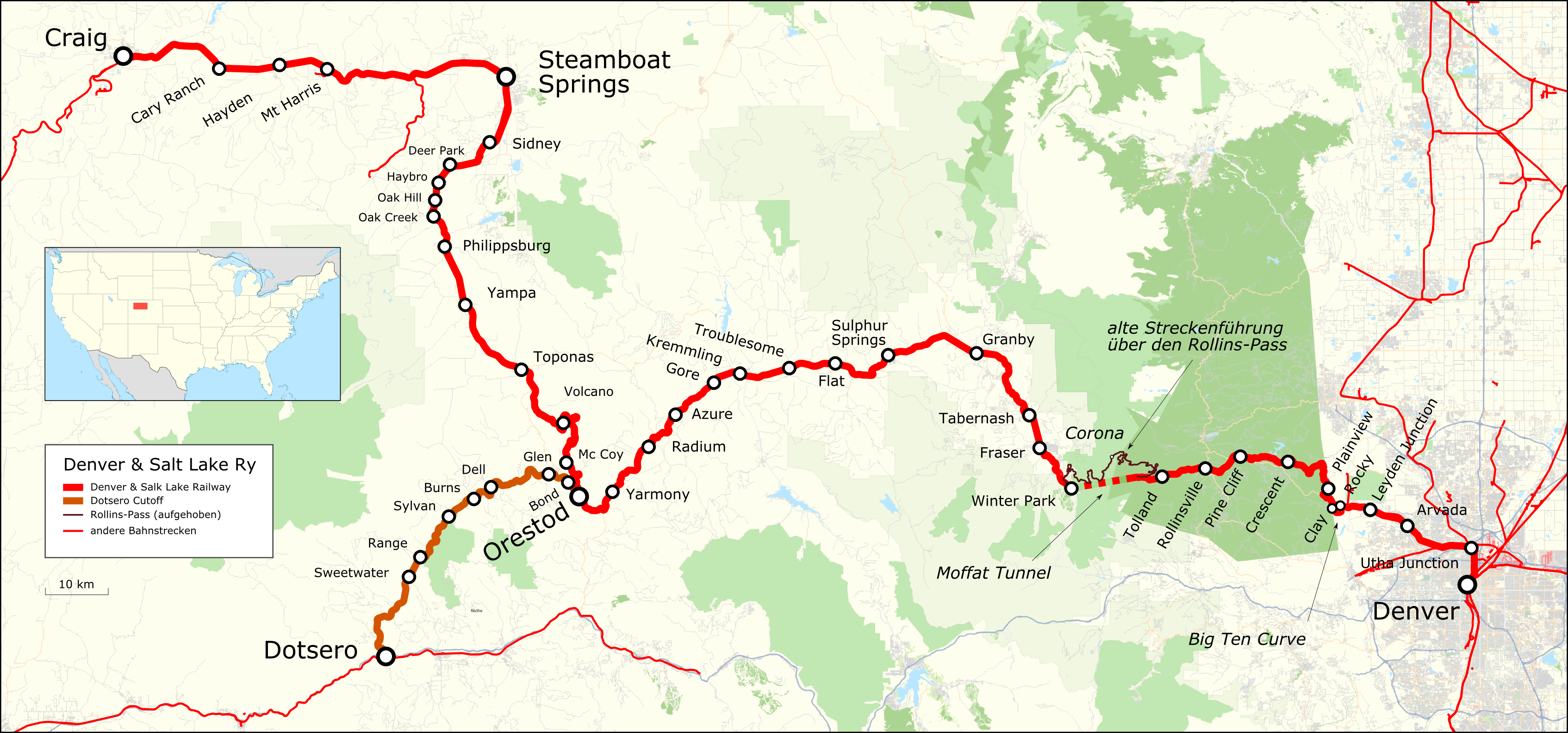
- Route of the Denver and Salt Lake Railway

Overview
- Headquarters: Denver
- Reporting mark: D&SL
- Locale: Colorado
- Dates of operation: 1902–1947

Technical
- Track gauge: 4 ft 8 1/2 in (1,435 mm) standard gauge

The Denver and Salt Lake Railway (D&SL) was a U.S. railroad company located in Colorado. It was incorporated in 1902 as the Denver, Northwestern and Pacific (DN&P) Railway with the goal of connecting Denver, Colorado with Salt Lake City, Utah. It underwent numerous reorganizations throughout its financially troubled history and, by the time it was acquired in 1931 by the Denver and Rio Grande Western Railroad (D&RGW or Rio Grande), it had advanced only as far west as Craig, Colorado. After its acquisition, it was connected to the D&RGW main. The eastern half of the line was used to give the D&RGW a more direct route to Denver; the western half became a spur line. The portions of the D&SL still in use today comprise the Moffat Tunnel Subdivision of Union Pacific Railroad's Central Corridor, and Amtrak’s California Zephyr uses a portion of the former D&SL between Denver and Bond.

== History ==
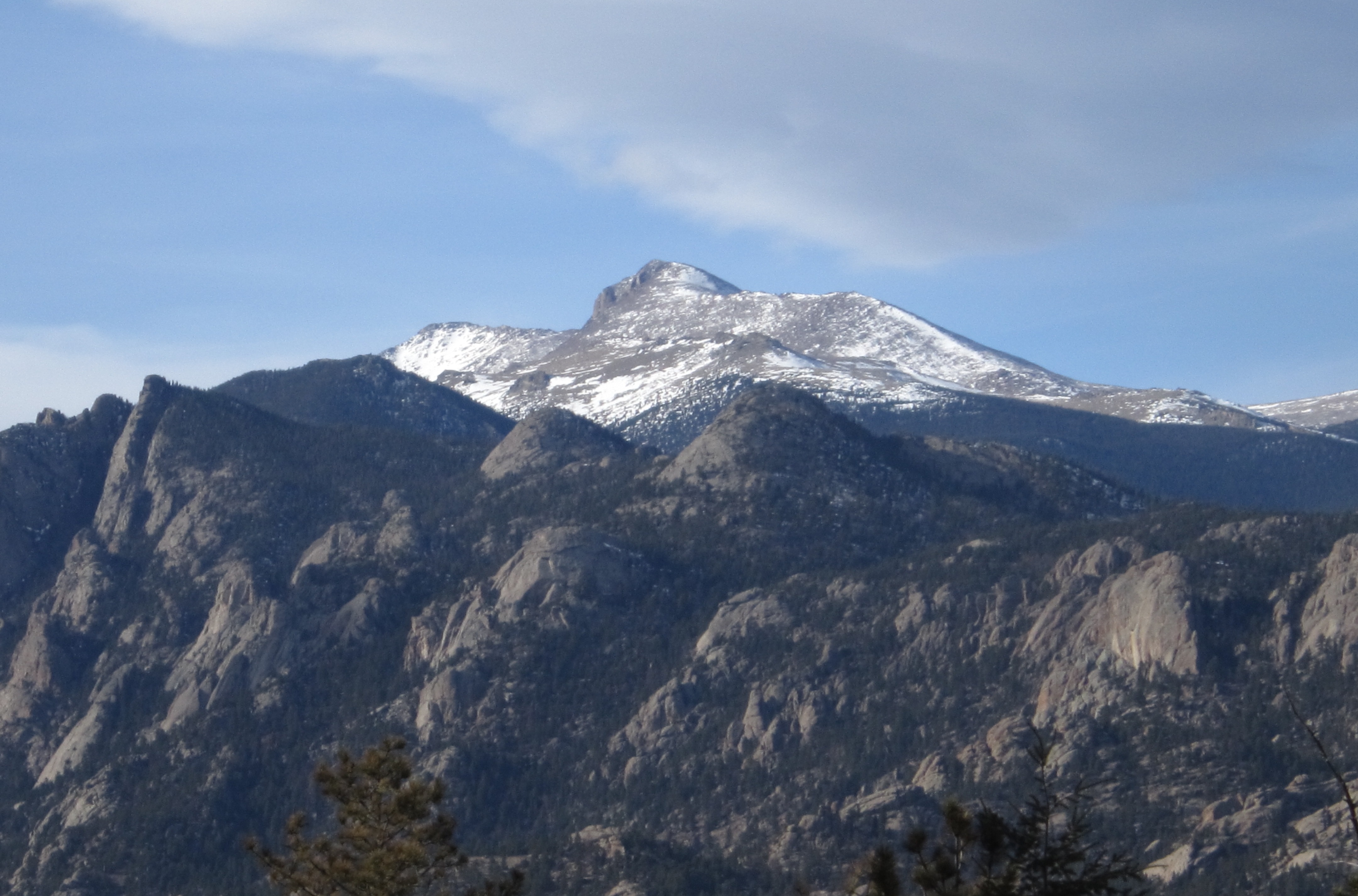
Front Range near Denver

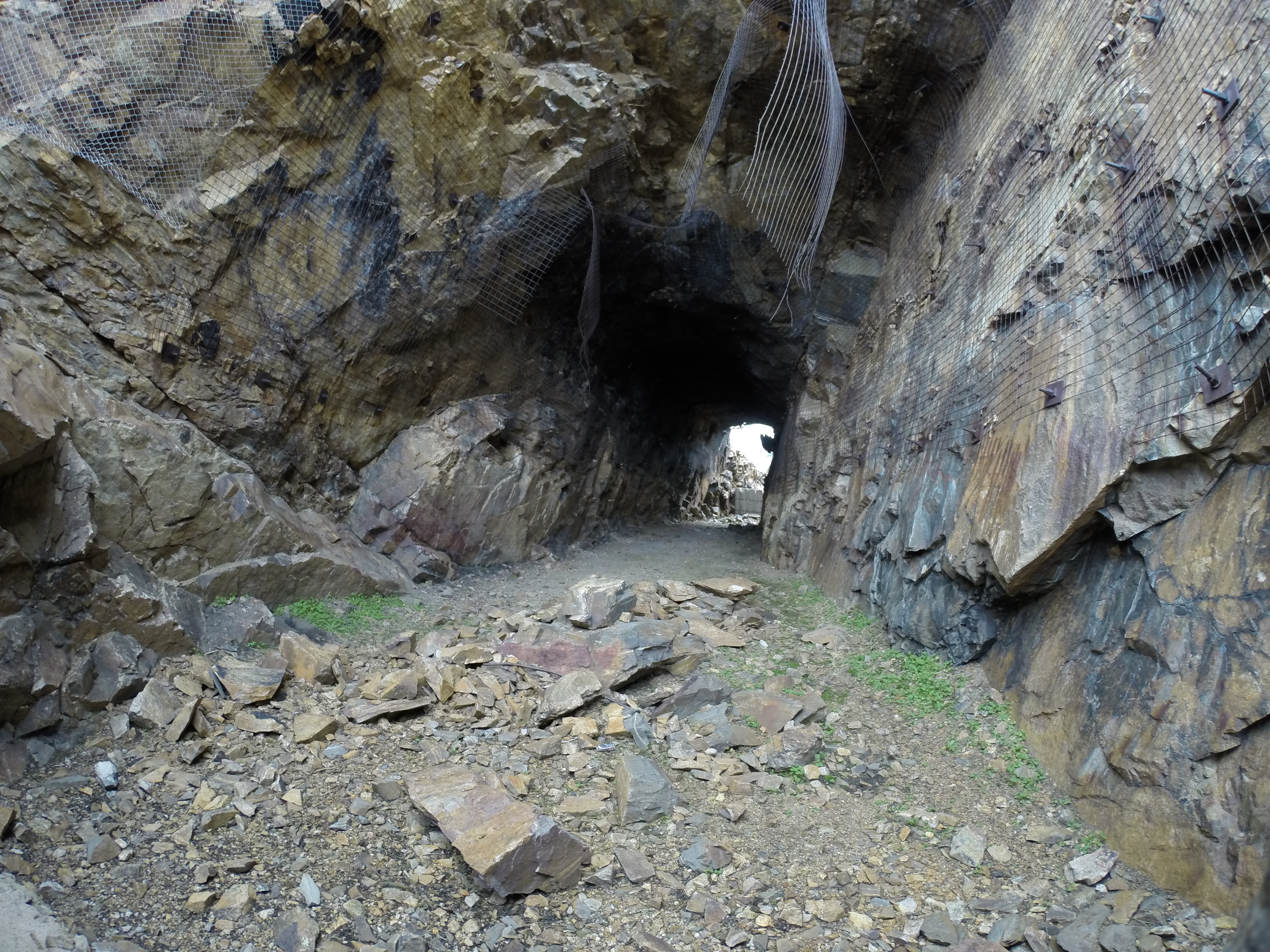
Needle's Eye Tunnel

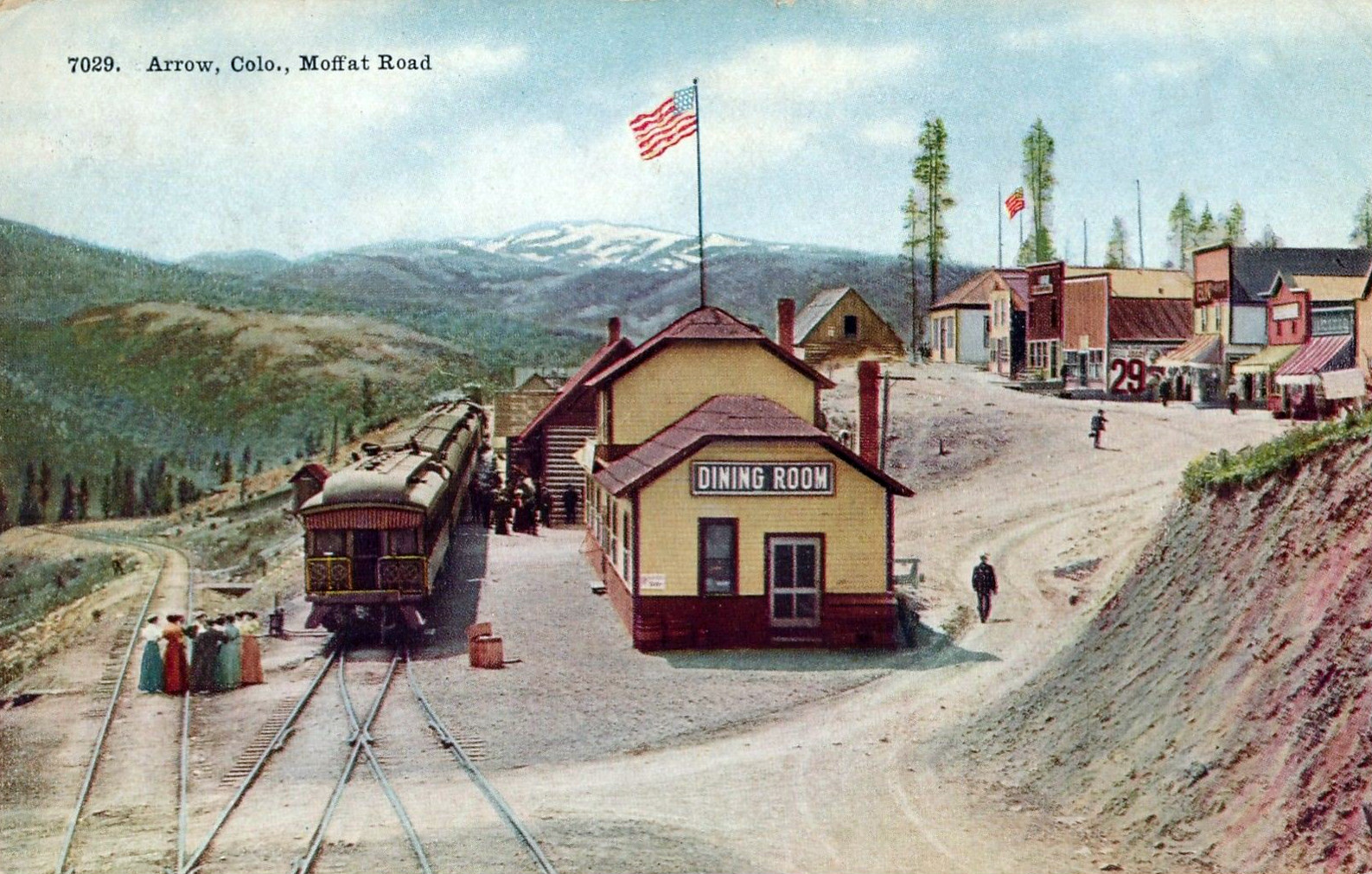
Arrow, Colorado

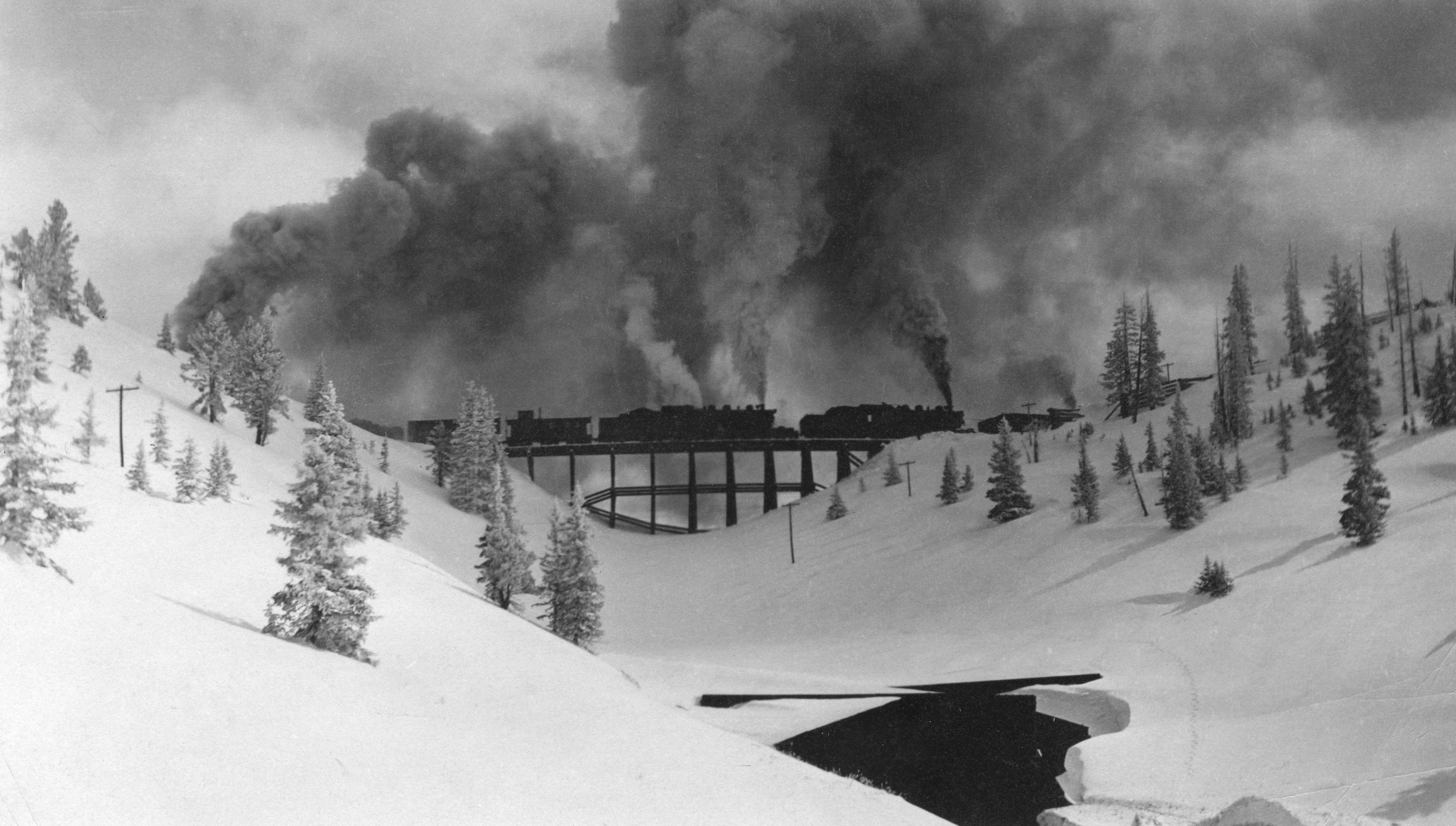
Winter atop Rollins Pass

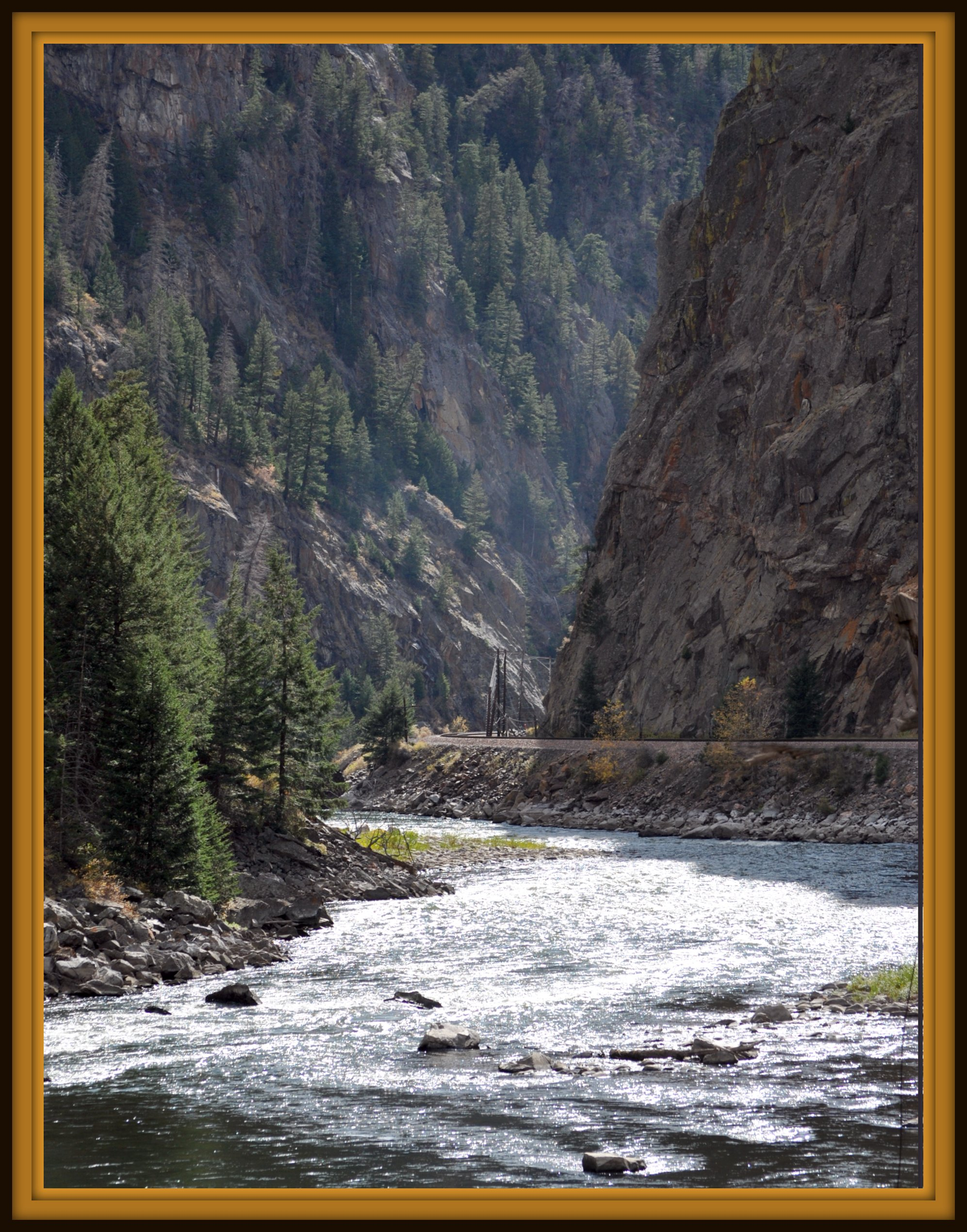
Gore Canyon

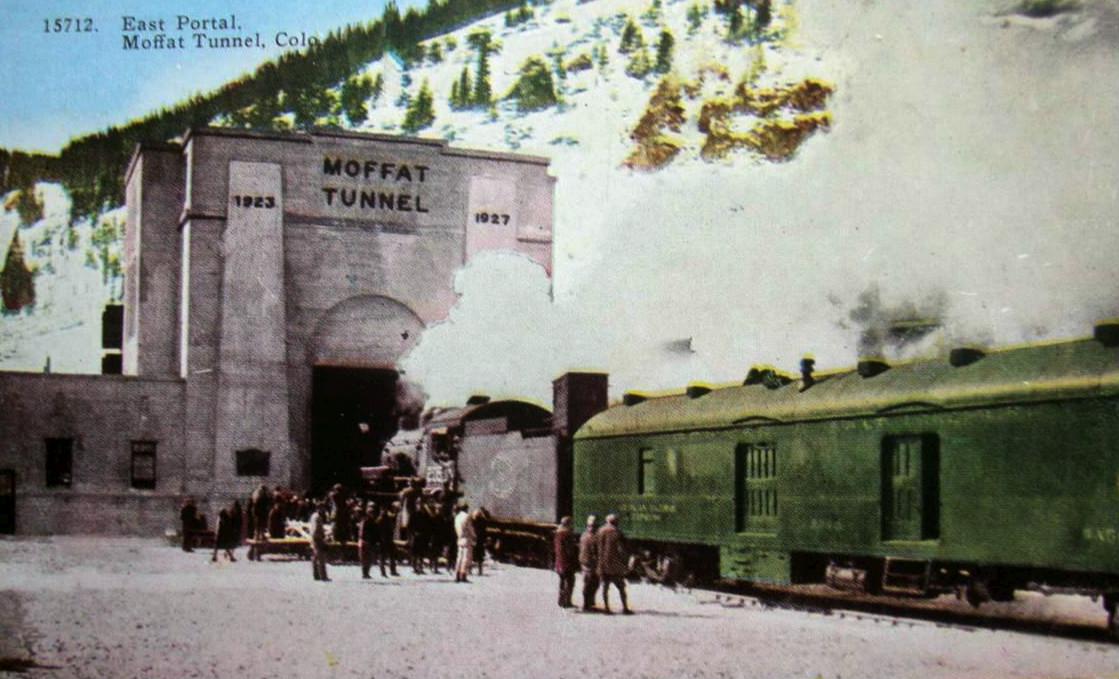
East portal-Moffat Tunnel

When the Denver, Northwestern and Pacific (DN&P) Railway was first incorporated in July 1902 by David H. Moffat, Walter S. Cheesman, William Gray Evans, Charles J. Hughes, Jr., George E. Ross-Lewin, S.M. Perry and Frank P. Gibson, Denver had been bypassed by the Union Pacific Railroad which reached Salt Lake City, Utah, via Cheyenne, Wyoming, and by the Denver and Rio Grande Western Railroad (D&RGW), which ran from Pueblo, Colorado, west through the Royal Gorge. The Denver business community wanted its own "Air Line" west of the city to connect directly with Salt Lake City, and the railway’s president, David Moffat, vigorously directed the DN&P Railway efforts to that goal.

=== Front Range ===
Construction began in December 1902 as the line headed west out of Denver and then started north up the face of the Front Range of the Rockies towards Boulder before turning west when it reached South Boulder Canyon. Chief Engineer H.A. Sumner, needing to enter the canyon area as high as possible but still maintain a 2% grade, gained the necessary altitude via the Big Ten Curve and some eight tunnels. As a bonus, his routing scheme along the front range provided rail passengers majestic views of Denver and its surrounding countryside.

=== Continental Divide ===
By 1903, the tracks reached the Tolland area just east of the Continental Divide where Sumner’s second major engineering feat involved crossing Rollins Pass at an elevation of 11,680 feet (3,560 m). Originally, Moffat had planned to build a tunnel underneath the pass but funding was not available at the time. The DN&P climbed to Rollins Pass using a series of switchbacks with a 4% grade at many locations; tunnels at various places as well as huge loops were also needed so as to get over the pass. At the time, it was the highest mainline railroad ever constructed in North America; the historic rail route over Rollins Pass was entered into the National Register of Historic Places in 1980 for its related engineering feats. Small rail stops at Corona at the top of the pass and at Arrow, 11 miles to the west, had restaurants and lodging which housed workers keeping the rail line free of snow in winter. Despite this, trains were often stranded for several days during heavy winter snows.

=== Middle Park ===
In the spring of 1905, the tracks were completed on the western side of the divide to Fraser, and from there, the line went through Granby, Hot Sulphur Springs, and Byers Canyon to the last of Sumner’s railroad engineering masterpieces, the three mile long traverse of Gore Canyon. Built on the side of the canyon wall, the railroad track is the only way through the canyon (other than whitewater rafting the Colorado River), and was considered a "monumental achievement" in its day. The road then continued west to State Bridge, where it then turned north to Steamboat Springs in the winter of 1909. By 1913, it arrived at what would turn out to be its final destination, Craig in Moffat County, Colorado.

=== Moffat Tunnel ===
The trials and tribulations of railroading over Rollins Pass were solved in 1928 with the completion and opening of the Moffat Tunnel, which cut through the Continental Divide under James Peak. This 6.2-mile (10.0 km) long bore is 9,239 feet (2,816 m) above sea level at its apex. Fifty miles west of Denver, the tunnel was 'holed' through on July 7, 1927, and formally turned over to the railroad on February 26, 1928. Moffat unfortunately never saw the tunnel that was named in his honor, as he had died in 1911 while in New York City, trying unsuccessfully to raise money to continue railroad construction.

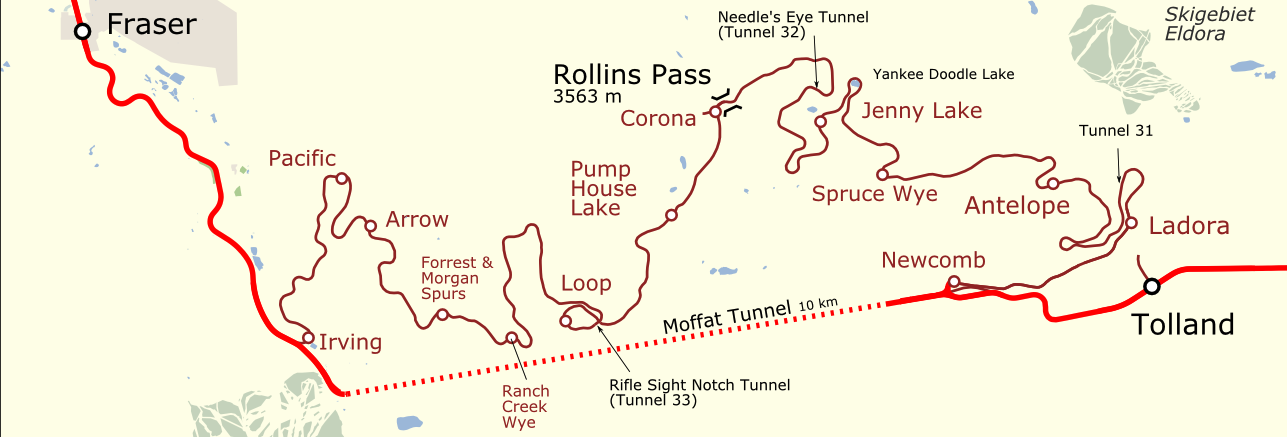
Moffat Tunnel/Rollins Pass

=== Dotsero Cutoff ===
One year after Moffat’s death, the railroad was placed in receivership, and in 1913 it was reformed as the Denver and Salt Lake Railroad. Reorganized as the Denver & Salt Lake Railway in 1926, the DS&L was acquired by the D&RGW in 1931 along with the Denver & Salt Lake Western Railroad (a company in name only), whose sole function was to acquire the rights to build a 40-mile (64-km) connection between the two railroads. In 1932, the D&RGW began construction of the Dotsero Cutoff, from Dotsero (east of Glenwood Springs) to connect to the D&SL at Bond on the Colorado River. This project, which was completed in 1934, finally gave Denver its direct rail line to Salt Lake City. In 1947, the D&SL was completely absorbed into the D&RGW, which in turn was taken over by the Southern Pacific in 1988 and finally the Union Pacific RR in 1996. As part of UP's Central Corridor, BNSF also has trackage rights, and the Cutoff has several trains daily of both companies. Other than the Rollins Pass section, the entirety of the original DS&L railroad route is still in use today.

== Unfinished route ==
In Utah, the unfinished portion of the Denver and Salt Lake Railroad would have passed through the Uinta Basin en route to Salt Lake. The Uinta basin has extensive oil shale resources. To take better advantage of this oil shale, multiple proposals to build a Uinta Basin Rail line connecting the basin to the national rail network have been made by both public and private interests, including multiple proposals made during 1915–1920. Some of these proposals involve constructing more of the proposed route of the former D&SL into Utah.

In 1984, the Deseret Power Railroad was built to connect a coal mine in Colorado with a power plant in Utah. The line follows a small portion of the proposed D&SL route, but is completely isolated from the national rail network.

In 2015, the Utah Department of Transportation (UDOT) completed a study on the state of Utah's rail infrastructure that identified the Uinta Basin line as a top priority for a freight rail corridor. The study noted the strain the lack of rail access is placing on highways that serve the basin, and the price disadvantage caused by lack of rail access compared to other oil producing regions with rail. The study identified multiple possible rail corridors, including some similar to the originally proposed D&SL route, but stated their preference as a route via Indian Canyon (which currently provides the route of U.S. Route 191 into the basin). This route would connect to the Central Corridor near Soldier Summit.
