= Craig–Moffat Airport =

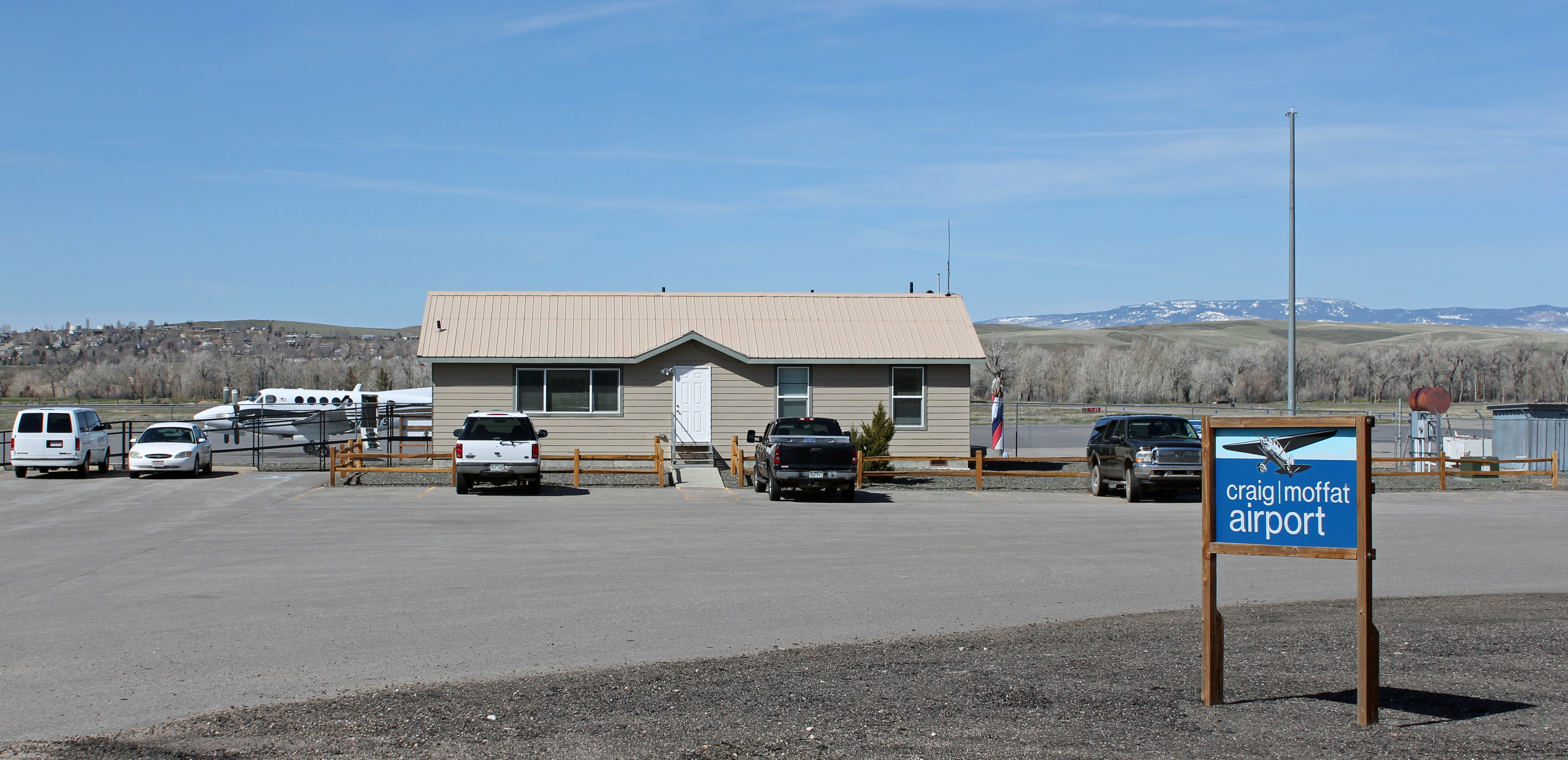
- Terminal building
- IATA: CIG; ICAO: KCAG; FAA LID: CAG; WMO: 72570

Summary
- Airport type: Public
- Owner: Moffat County
- Location: Craig, Colorado
- Elevation AMSL: 6,198 ft (1,889 m)
- Coordinates: 40°29′43″N 107°31′18″W
- Website: Official website
- Interactive map of Craig–Moffat Airport

Runways
Direction	Length		Surface
Direction	ft	m	Surface
7/25	5,606	1,709	Asphalt

Statistics (2021)
- Aircraft operations: 12,000
- Source: Federal Aviation Administration

Craig–Moffat Airport (IATA: CIG, ICAO: KCAG, FAA LID: CAG) (Craig–Moffat County Airport) is a public airport two miles southeast of Craig, in Moffat County, Colorado, United States.

Most U.S. airports use the same three-letter location identifier for the FAA and IATA, but Craig–Moffat Airport is CAG to the FAA and CIG to the IATA (which assigned CAG to Cagliari Elmas Airport in Italy).

== Facilities and aircraft ==
Craig–Moffat Airport covers 277 acres (112 ha); its one runway (7/25) is 5,606 x 100 ft. (1,709 x 30 m) asphalt.

In the year ending December 31, 2021, the airport had 12,000 aircraft operations, average 33 per day, all general aviation.

== Past airline service ==
During the mid 1970s, the airport was served by Rocky Mountain Airways with flights to Denver (DEN) operated with de Havilland Canada DHC-6 Twin Otter turboprop aircraft.

== Incident ==
In 2001, a McDonnell Douglas MD-80 jetliner operated by Trans World Airlines mistakenly landed at the airport during a snow shower. TWA flight 641 from St. Louis was scheduled to land at nearby Yampa Valley Airport (HDN) in Hayden, CO, which had a runway nearly twice as long as Craig–Moffat Airport. The plane landed safely, and there were no injuries sustained by the 122 people on board; however, the jet became stuck in the mud as it attempted to navigate the taxiway following the landing.

== See also ==
- List of airports in Colorado
