= Bond, Colorado =

Unincorporated community in Colorado, US

- Unincorporated community
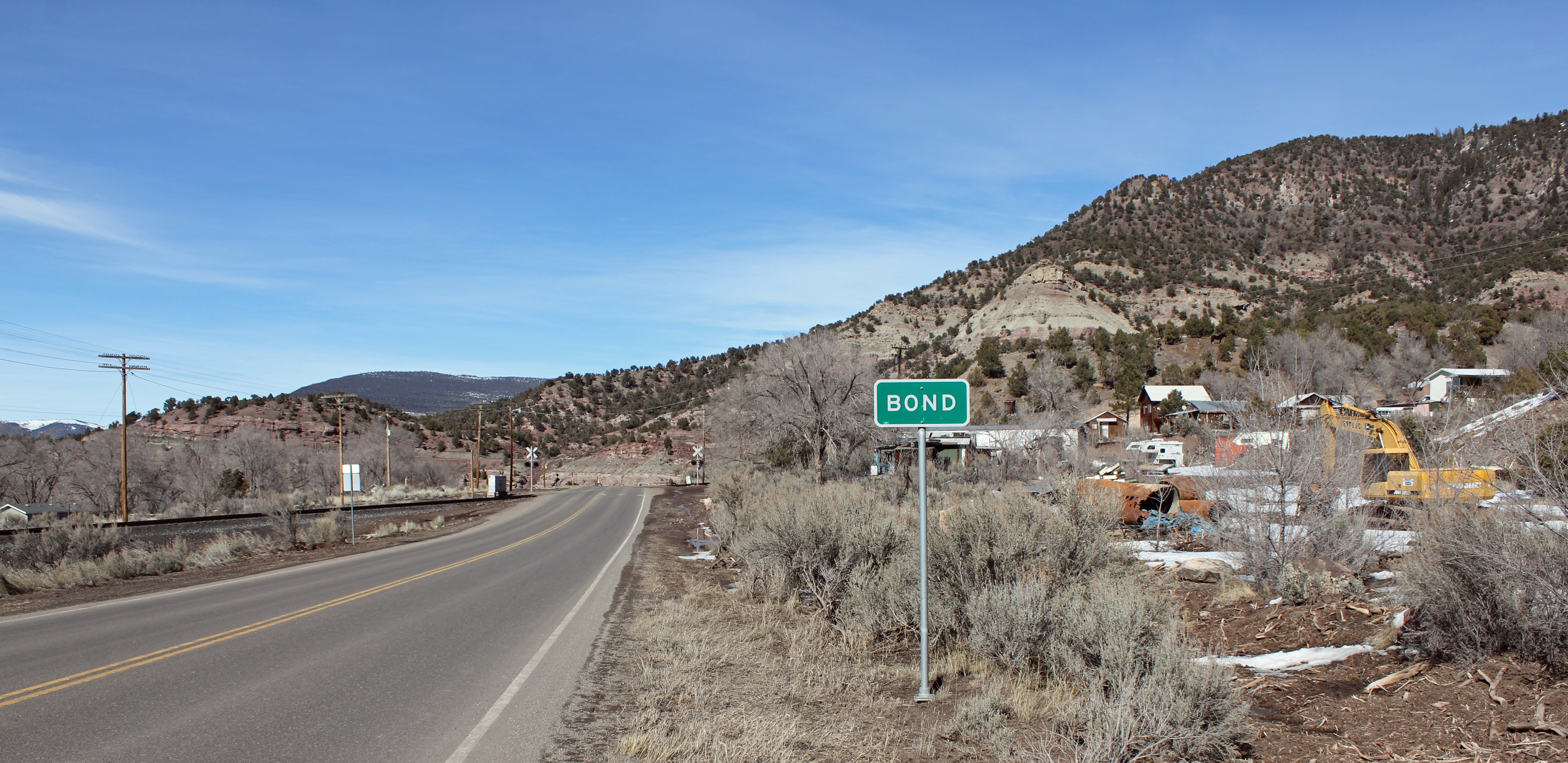
- Entering Bond from the south

- Location of Bond, Colorado. Bond (Colorado)
- Coordinates: 39°52′34″N 106°41′16″W
- Country: United States
- State: Colorado
- County: Eagle

Government
  - Type: unincorporated community
  - Body: Eagle County
- Elevation: 6,739 ft (2,054 m)

Population (2020)
  - Total: 183
- Time zone: UTC−07:00 (MST)
  - Summer (DST): UTC−06:00 (MDT)
- ZIP Code: 80423
- GNIS pop ID: 202320

Bond is an unincorporated community and U.S. Post Office located along the Colorado River in Eagle County, Colorado, United States. The Bond post office has the ZIP Code 80423. Although Bond has never had a sizable population, the town has significant railroad history, and once was a stop for most of the passenger trains along the Denver and Rio Grande Western's main line.

== History ==
=== Railroad ===
Bond was originally served by the never finished Denver and Salt Lake Railroad as a midpoint to the railroad's eventual terminus in Craig, Colorado. Bond was the closest point of the rail line to the nearest through line, the Denver and Rio Grande Western's (D&RGW) mainline which reached the Colorado River about 40 miles (64 km) downstream from Bond. The D&RGW purchased the rights to connect the two lines, with the intent of having a more direct connection between Denver and Salt Lake City. In 1932, the D&RGW began construction of the Dotsero Cutoff. The southwestern end of the cutoff became known as Dotsero (a portmanteau of "Dot Zero," the zero mileage point.) The northeastern end of the cutoff near Bond became known as Orestod (the inverse spelling of Dotsero.) When Dotsero Cutoff was completed in 1934, the Moffat Route joined the Rio Grande Mainline, and the tracks from Bond to Craig became a spur line. The Bond, Colorado, post office opened on December 4, 1935. Bond remained a stop on the Denver and Rio Grande Western's passenger trains until their last train, the Rio Grande Zephyr was discontinued in 1983. The D&RGW was merged with the Southern Pacific, and in turn the Union Pacific in 1996. As part of UP's Central Corridor, the line is now also used by BNSF which has trackage rights.

== Geography ==
Bond is located 133 miles (214 kilometers) west of Denver along the Colorado River, and is at the southern terminus of the Colorado River Headwaters National Scenic Byway.

=== Climate ===
This climate type is dominated by the winter season, a long, bitterly cold period with short, clear days, relatively little precipitation mostly in the form of snow, and low humidity. According to the Köppen Climate Classification system, Bond has a subarctic climate, abbreviated "Dfc" on climate maps.

Climate data for Bond, Colorado
Month	Jan	Feb	Mar	Apr	May	Jun	Jul	Aug	Sep	Oct	Nov	Dec	Year
Mean daily maximum °C (°F)	−3 (27)	0 (32)	6 (43)	13 (55)	18 (65)	25 (77)	28 (82)	27 (81)	23 (73)	16 (61)	7 (44)	−1 (30)	13 (56)
Mean daily minimum °C (°F)	−18 (0)	−16 (3)	−9 (16)	−4 (25)	1 (33)	5 (41)	8 (47)	8 (47)	4 (39)	−2 (28)	−8 (18)	−15 (5)	−4 (25)
Average precipitation mm (inches)	23 (0.9)	18 (0.7)	13 (0.5)	13 (0.5)	15 (0.6)	15 (0.6)	30 (1.2)	33 (1.3)	20 (0.8)	20 (0.8)	15 (0.6)	20 (0.8)	240 (9.3)
Source: Weatherbase

== See also ==
- Colorado River Headwaters National Scenic Byway
- Dotsero Cutoff
