= Maybell, Colorado =

Census-designated place in Colorado, US

- Census-designated place
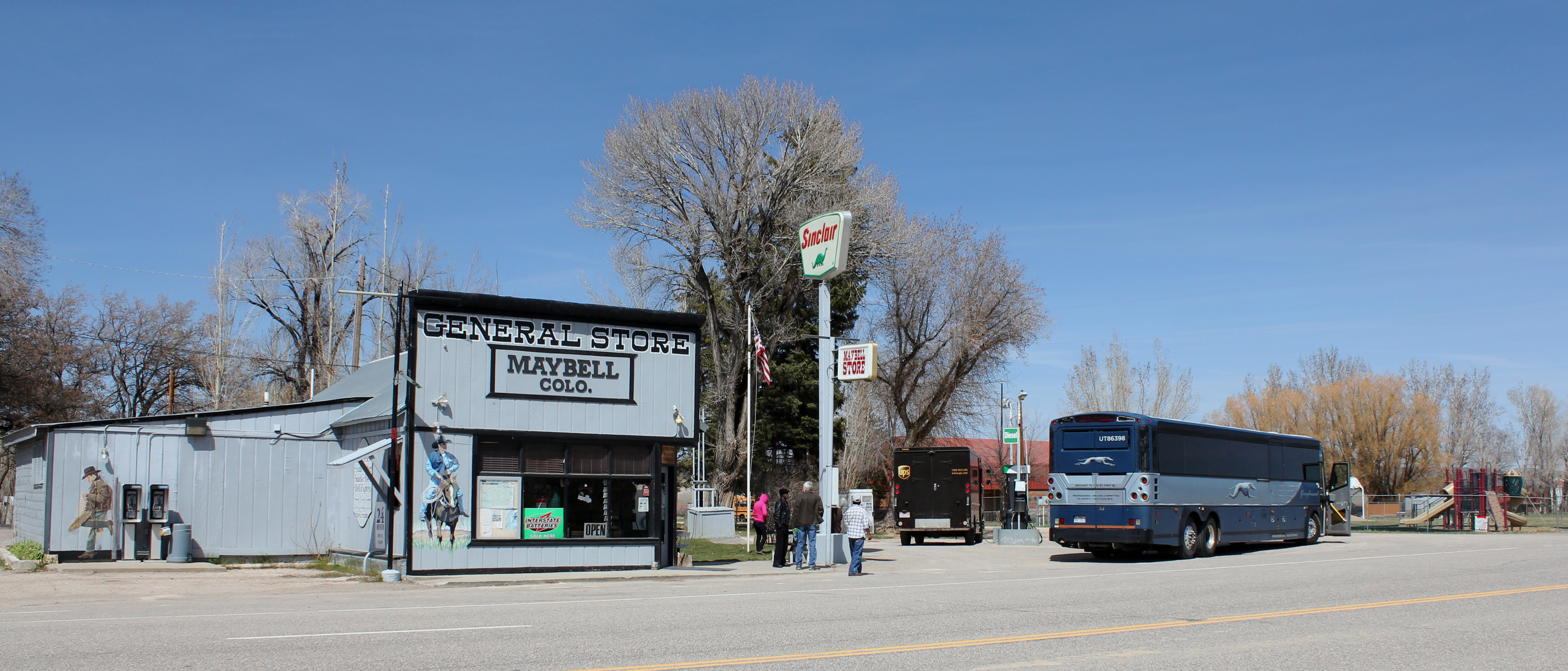
- The general store in Maybell

- Location in Moffat County, Colorado
- Coordinates: 40°31′08″N 108°05′19″W
- Country: United States
- State: Colorado
- County: Moffat

Government
  - Type: Unincorporated community

Area
  - Total: 0.525 sq mi (1.36 km^{2})
  - Land: 0.525 sq mi (1.36 km^{2})
  - Water: 0.0 sq mi (0 km^{2})
- Elevation: 5,916 ft (1,803 m)

Population (2020)
  - Total: 76
  - Density: 144.8/sq mi (55.9/km^{2})
- Time zone: UTC-7 (MST)
  - Summer (DST): UTC-6 (MDT)
- ZIP Code: 81640
- Area code: 970
- GNIS feature: 2583264

Maybell is an unincorporated community and census-designated place (CDP) in and governed by Moffat County, Colorado, United States. The CDP is a part of the Craig, CO Micropolitan Statistical Area.

The Maybell post office has the ZIP Code 81640. At the 2020 census, the population of the Maybell CDP was 76. The coldest ambient air temperature ever recorded in the state of Colorado was −61 °F (−52 °C) at Maybell on February 1, 1985.

== History ==
The village, founded in the 1880s, was named after May Bell, the wife of a local cattleman. Contrary to folk legends, the town was not named after his prized dairy cow. It currently consists of a meat processing plant, general store with gas pumps, a garage, an elementary school, a residential hotel, a restaurant, a post office, and housing. The post office has been in operation since 1884.

== Geography ==
Maybell is located in central Moffat County, in the valley of the Yampa River along U.S. Highway 40. Craig is 30 miles (48 km) east along US 40, and Dinosaur is 57 miles (92 km) to the west. State Highway 318 leads northwest from Maybell 61 miles (98 km) to the Utah border, passing Browns Park National Wildlife Refuge.

The Maybell CDP has an area of 0.525 square miles (1.360 km^{2}), all land.

=== Climate ===
This climatic region is typified by large seasonal temperature differences, with warm to hot (and often humid) summers and cold (sometimes severely cold) winters. The climate of Maybell is a humid continental climate (Dfb).

The coldest ambient air temperature ever recorded in the State of Colorado was −61 °F (−52 °C) at Maybell on February 1, 1985.

Climate data for Maybell, Colorado, 1991–2020 normals, extremes 1958–present: 5944ft (1812m)
Month	Jan	Feb	Mar	Apr	May	Jun	Jul	Aug	Sep	Oct	Nov	Dec	Year
Record high °F (°C)	56 (13)	66 (19)	82 (28)	82 (28)	91 (33)	96 (36)	102 (39)	98 (37)	95 (35)	87 (31)	70 (21)	64 (18)	102 (39)
Mean maximum °F (°C)	46 (8)	51 (11)	65 (18)	75 (24)	83 (28)	91 (33)	94 (34)	93 (34)	86 (30)	77 (25)	63 (17)	50 (10)	94 (34)
Mean daily maximum °F (°C)	31.5 (−0.3)	36.7 (2.6)	48.4 (9.1)	57.6 (14.2)	67.9 (19.9)	79.2 (26.2)	86.2 (30.1)	83.9 (28.8)	75.1 (23.9)	60.8 (16.0)	45.5 (7.5)	33.0 (0.6)	58.8 (14.9)
Daily mean °F (°C)	16.2 (−8.8)	21.9 (−5.6)	33.1 (0.6)	41.1 (5.1)	50.3 (10.2)	59.4 (15.2)	66.5 (19.2)	64.5 (18.1)	55.4 (13.0)	42.5 (5.8)	29.6 (−1.3)	18.2 (−7.7)	41.6 (5.3)
Mean daily minimum °F (°C)	0.9 (−17.3)	7.1 (−13.8)	17.7 (−7.9)	24.6 (−4.1)	32.8 (0.4)	39.5 (4.2)	46.7 (8.2)	45.2 (7.3)	35.6 (2.0)	24.2 (−4.3)	13.6 (−10.2)	3.4 (−15.9)	24.3 (−4.3)
Mean minimum °F (°C)	−25 (−32)	−18 (−28)	−1 (−18)	12 (−11)	21 (−6)	30 (−1)	37 (3)	35 (2)	23 (−5)	10 (−12)	−6 (−21)	−22 (−30)	−30 (−34)
Record low °F (°C)	−60 (−51)	−61 (−52)	−21 (−29)	−11 (−24)	10 (−12)	22 (−6)	26 (−3)	28 (−2)	8 (−13)	−18 (−28)	−26 (−32)	−50 (−46)	−61 (−52)
Average precipitation inches (mm)	0.89 (23)	0.93 (24)	1.16 (29)	1.47 (37)	1.27 (32)	0.74 (19)	0.64 (16)	0.97 (25)	1.10 (28)	1.32 (34)	1.11 (28)	1.02 (26)	12.62 (321)
Average snowfall inches (cm)	10.9 (28)	9.2 (23)	8.4 (21)	3.6 (9.1)	0.7 (1.8)	0.0 (0.0)	0.0 (0.0)	0.0 (0.0)	0.0 (0.0)	2.6 (6.6)	8.2 (21)	11.7 (30)	55.3 (140.5)
Source 1: NOAA
Source 2: XMACIS (records & monthly max/mins)

== Demographics ==
Maybell CDP, Colorado
Year	Pop.	±%
2010	72	—
2020	76	+5.6%
Source: United States Census Bureau

The United States Census Bureau initially defined the Maybell CDP for the United States Census 2010.

== See also ==
- List of census-designated places in Colorado
