= Jennifer LeRoy =

American model and actress (born 1974)

Playboy centerfold appearance
- February 1993
- Preceded by: Echo Johnson
- Succeeded by: Kimberly Donley

Personal details
- Born: January 7, 1974 (age 51) Craig, Colorado, United States
- Height: 5 ft 10 in (1.78 m)

Jennifer LeRoy (born January 7, 1974, in Craig, Colorado) is an American model and actress. She was chosen as Playboy's Playmate of the Month in February, 1993 (which made her the second Playboy Playmate with a visible tattoo on her centerfold, after Star Stowe), and has appeared in numerous Playboy videos.

She is the sister of Olympic skier Andy LeRoy. They grew up in Steamboat Springs, Colorado, with their widowed mother. At the age of 16, LeRoy left Colorado to become a runway model around the world.

In 2005, LeRoy gave birth to her daughter, Amla L. Manera.

== See also ==
- List of people in Playboy 1990–99

Echo Johnson	Jennifer LeRoy	Kimberly Donley	Nicole Wood	Elke Jeinsen	Alesha Oreskovich
Leisa Sheridan	Jennifer Lavoie	Carrie Westcott	Jenny McCarthy	Julianna Young	Arlene Baxter
