= Colorado State Highway 325 =

State highway in Garfield County, Colorado, United States

State Highway 325
- SH 325 highlighted in red

Route information
- Maintained by CDOT
- Length: 11.395 mi (18.338 km)

Major junctions
- South end: SH 13 north of Rifle
- North end: Rifle Mountain Park

Location
- Country: United States
- State: Colorado
- Counties: Garfield

Highway system
- Colorado State Highway System; Interstate; US; State; Scenic
← SH 318	→ SH 330

State Highway 325 (SH 325) is a 11.395-mile (18.338 km) state highway in Garfield County, Colorado, United States, that connects Colorado State Highway 13 (SH 13), north of Rifle, with Rifle Mountain Park.

== Route description ==
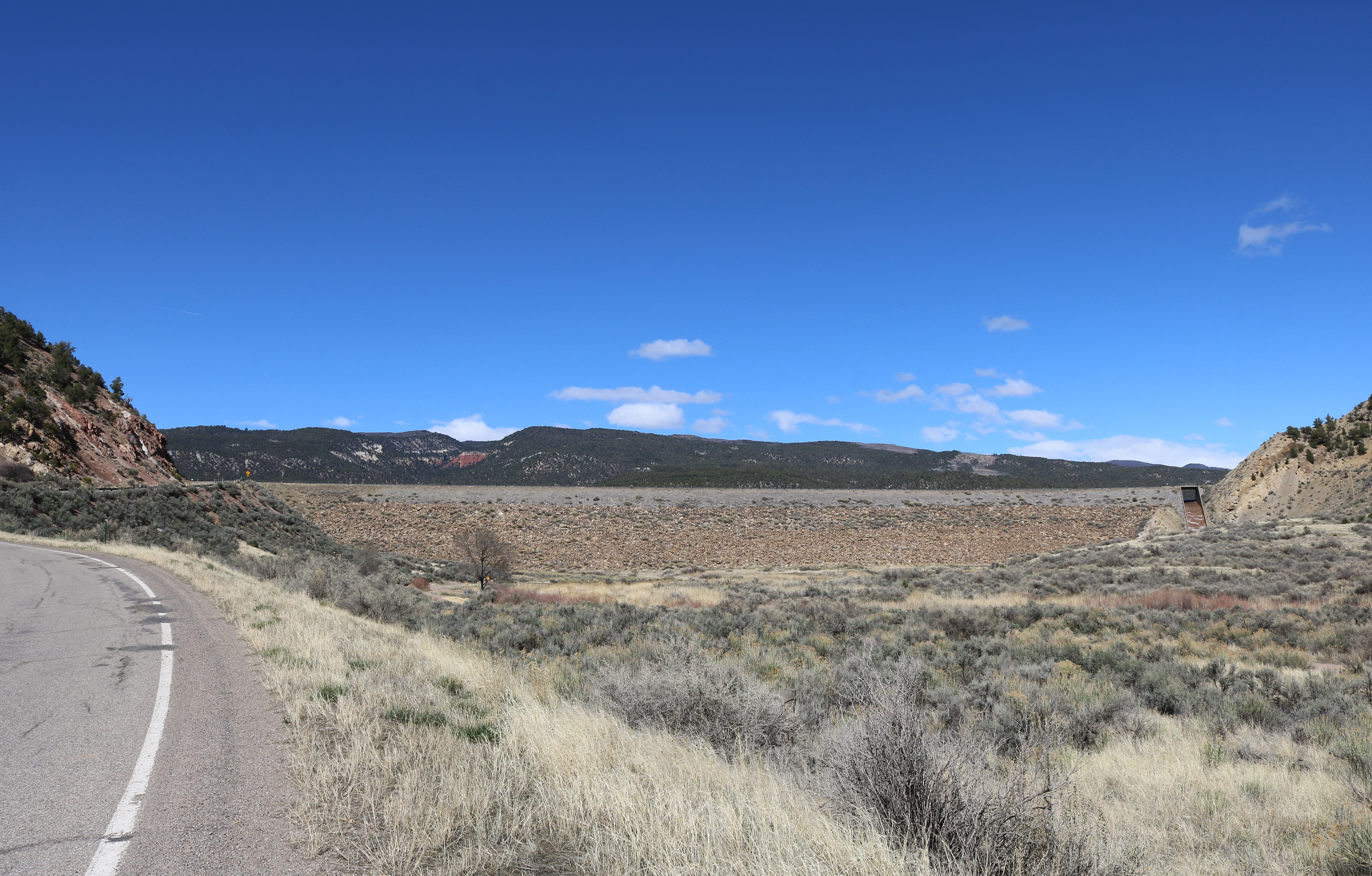
SH 325 and Rifle Gap Dam, March 2017

SH 325 runs 11.4 miles (18.3 km), starting at a junction with SH 13 north of Rifle. The highway goes north to Rifle Gap State Park. From there it follows East Rifle Creek east and then north to Rifle Falls State Park. After passing the falls it continues north along the creek, ending at the entrance to Rifle Mountain Park.

== Major intersections ==
The entire route is in Garfield County.

Location	mi	km	Destinations	Notes
	0.000	0.000	SH 13 north (Government Road) – Meeker SH 13 south (Government Road) – Rifle	Southern terminus; T intersection
	11.395	18.338	Rifle Mountain Park	Northern terminus
1.000 mi = 1.609 km; 1.000 km = 0.621 mi

== See also ==
- List of state highways in Colorado
- Valley Curtain
