= Hamilton, Colorado =

Unincorporated community in Moffat County, CO, USA

- Unincorporated community
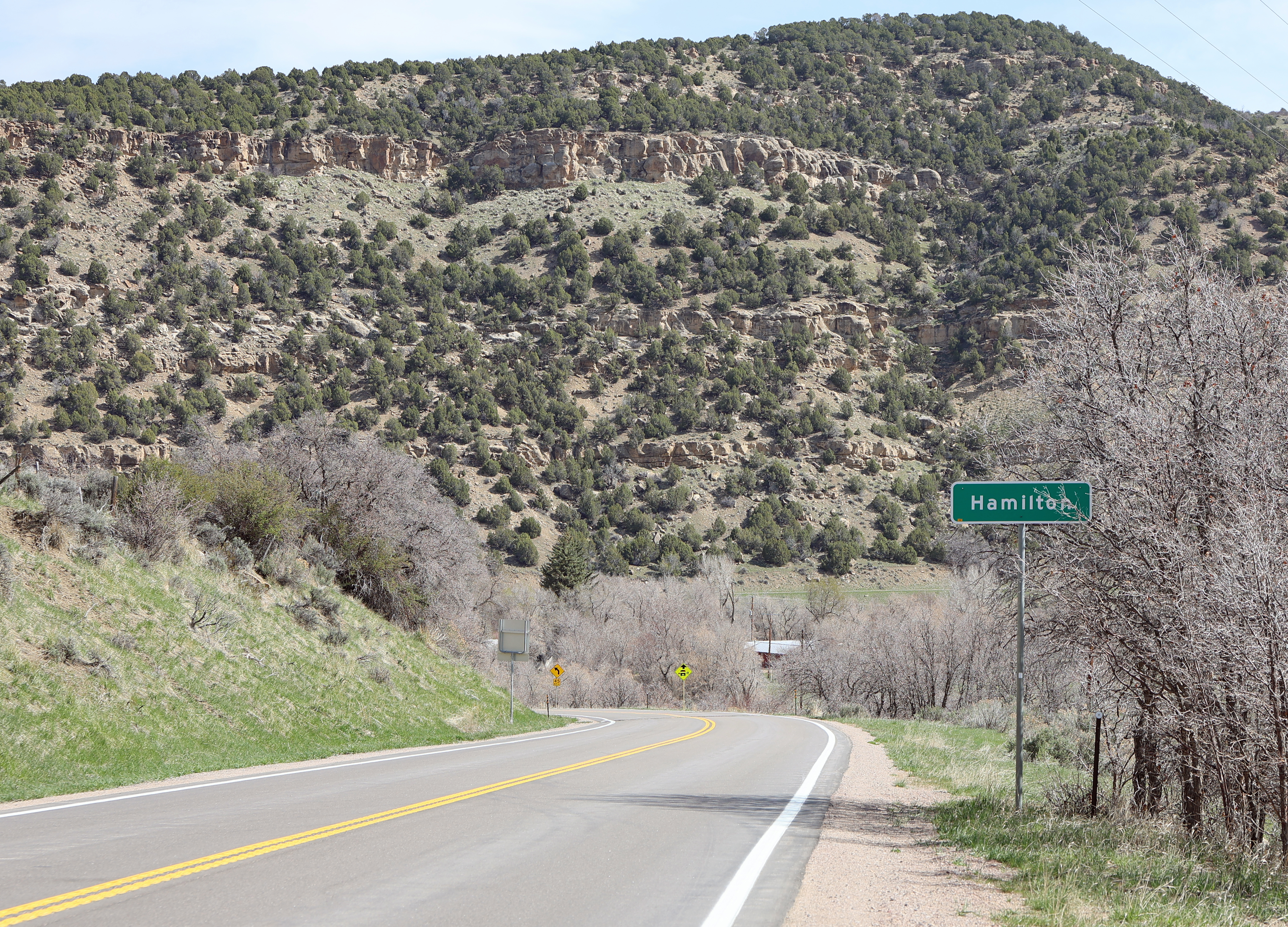
- Entering Hamilton from the south on State Highway 13

- Location within Colorado Location within the United States
- Coordinates: 40°22′02″N 107°36′47″W
- Country: United States
- State: Colorado
- Counties: Moffat
- Elevation: 6,244 ft (1,903 m)
- Time zone: UTC-7 (MST)
  - Summer (DST): UTC-6 (MDT)
- ZIP code: 81638
- Area code: 970
- GNIS feature ID: 171491

Hamilton is an unincorporated community with a U.S. Post Office in Moffat County, Colorado, United States.

== Climate ==
Craig 4SW is a weather station near Hamilton. Craig 4SW has a humid continental climate (Köppen Dfb).

Climate data for Craig 4SW, Colorado, 1991–2020 normals, 1977-2020 records: 6496ft (1980m)
Month	Jan	Feb	Mar	Apr	May	Jun	Jul	Aug	Sep	Oct	Nov	Dec	Year
Record high °F (°C)	57 (14)	63 (17)	76 (24)	80 (27)	88 (31)	98 (37)	99 (37)	96 (36)	97 (36)	85 (29)	73 (23)	60 (16)	99 (37)
Mean maximum °F (°C)	44.7 (7.1)	50.2 (10.1)	64.7 (18.2)	73.2 (22.9)	80.8 (27.1)	89.2 (31.8)	93.4 (34.1)	91.5 (33.1)	86.6 (30.3)	77.4 (25.2)	63.8 (17.7)	49.3 (9.6)	94.1 (34.5)
Mean daily maximum °F (°C)	30.3 (−0.9)	35.3 (1.8)	46.9 (8.3)	56.0 (13.3)	65.7 (18.7)	77.8 (25.4)	85.2 (29.6)	83.2 (28.4)	74.6 (23.7)	60.6 (15.9)	44.8 (7.1)	31.9 (−0.1)	57.7 (14.3)
Daily mean °F (°C)	18.6 (−7.4)	23.0 (−5.0)	33.4 (0.8)	41.5 (5.3)	50.6 (10.3)	60.3 (15.7)	67.4 (19.7)	65.7 (18.7)	57.0 (13.9)	44.4 (6.9)	31.6 (−0.2)	20.3 (−6.5)	42.8 (6.0)
Mean daily minimum °F (°C)	7.0 (−13.9)	10.8 (−11.8)	19.9 (−6.7)	27.0 (−2.8)	35.5 (1.9)	42.8 (6.0)	49.6 (9.8)	48.2 (9.0)	39.3 (4.1)	28.3 (−2.1)	18.4 (−7.6)	8.8 (−12.9)	28.0 (−2.3)
Mean minimum °F (°C)	−12.0 (−24.4)	−7.1 (−21.7)	5.0 (−15.0)	16.0 (−8.9)	25.6 (−3.6)	34.5 (1.4)	42.9 (6.1)	41.3 (5.2)	28.8 (−1.8)	14.0 (−10.0)	0.2 (−17.7)	−10.4 (−23.6)	−17.0 (−27.2)
Record low °F (°C)	−36 (−38)	−41 (−41)	−13 (−25)	−1 (−18)	18 (−8)	23 (−5)	34 (1)	31 (−1)	16 (−9)	−10 (−23)	−16 (−27)	−31 (−35)	−41 (−41)
Average precipitation inches (mm)	1.20 (30)	1.10 (28)	1.28 (33)	1.85 (47)	1.88 (48)	1.08 (27)	1.19 (30)	1.28 (33)	1.79 (45)	1.83 (46)	1.42 (36)	1.45 (37)	17.35 (440)
Average snowfall inches (cm)	14.5 (37)	11.0 (28)	8.7 (22)	5.1 (13)	1.2 (3.0)	trace	0.0 (0.0)	0.0 (0.0)	trace	3.2 (8.1)	9.0 (23)	14.9 (38)	67.6 (172.1)
Average extreme snow depth inches (cm)	11.2 (28)	9.8 (25)	6.6 (17)	3.1 (7.9)	1.1 (2.8)	0.0 (0.0)	0.0 (0.0)	0.0 (0.0)	0.4 (1.0)	2.7 (6.9)	5.0 (13)	9.3 (24)	14.0 (36)
Average precipitation days (≥ 0.01 in)	7	6	6	7	7	5	5	6	6	6	6	6	73
Average snowy days (≥ 0.1 in)	8	6	5	3	1	0	0	0	0	1	4	6	34
Source 1: NOAA
Source 2: XMACIS2 (records, monthly max/mins, snow & precip/snow days)
