= Hayden, Colorado =

Town in Colorado, United States

- Home rule municipality
- Town of Hayden
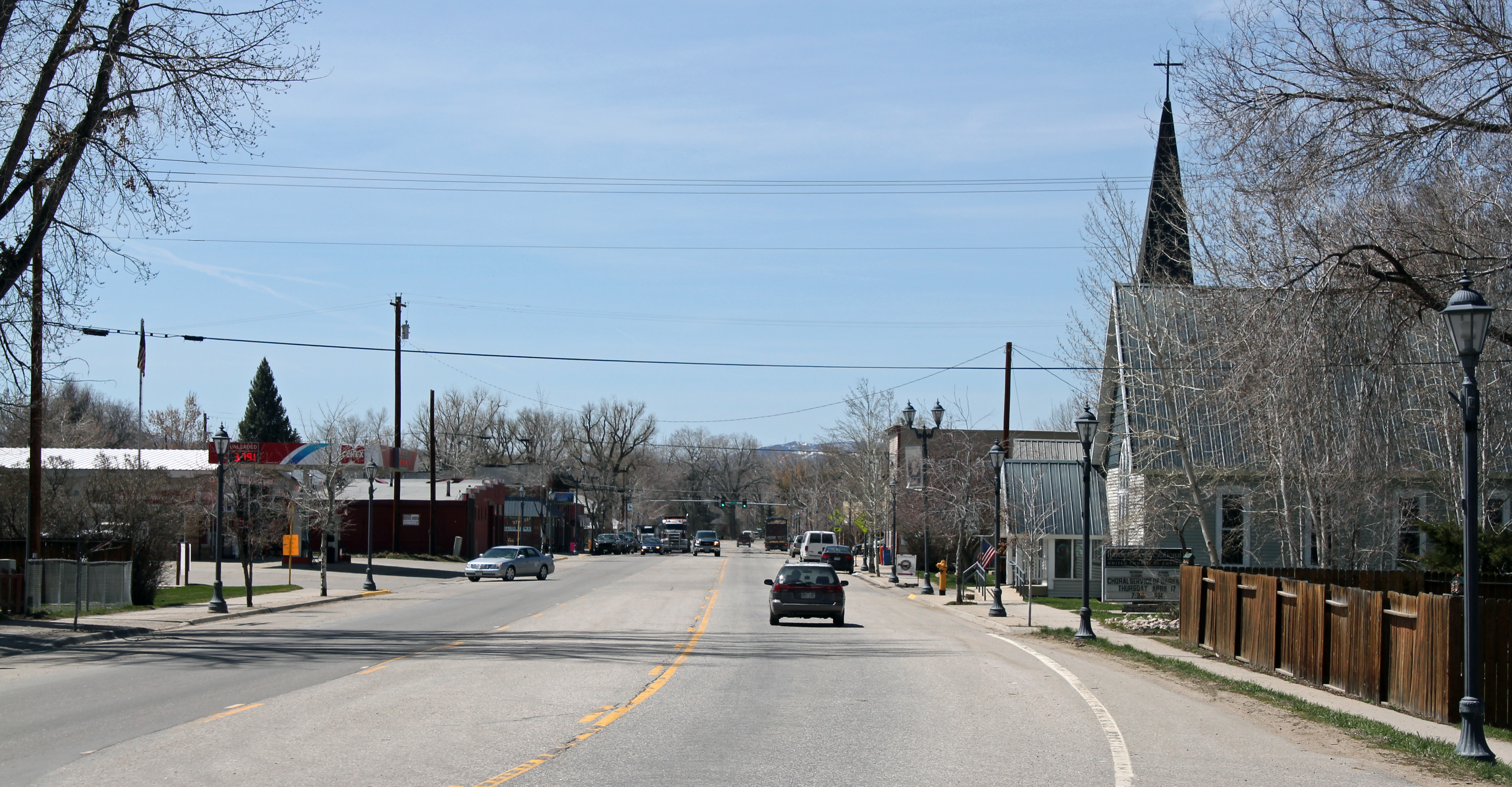
- Jefferson Avenue (U.S. Route 40) in Hayden

- Location of the Town of Hayden in Routt County, Colorado
- Coordinates: 40°29′13″N 107°15′19″W
- Country: United States
- State: Colorado
- County: Routt County
- Established: 1894
- Incorporated (town): May 5, 1906

Government
  - Type: Home Rule Municipality

Area
  - Home rule municipality: 3.278 sq mi (8.490 km^{2})
  - Land: 3.278 sq mi (8.490 km^{2})
  - Water: 0 sq mi (0.000 km^{2})
- Elevation: 6,585 ft (2,007 m)

Population (2020)
  - Home rule municipality: 1,941
  - Density: 592/sq mi (229/km^{2})
  - Metro: 24,829
  - CSA: 38,121
- Time zone: UTC−07:00 (MST)
  - Summer (DST): UTC−06:00 (MDT)
- ZIP code: 81639
- Area code: 970
- FIPS code: 08-35070
- GNIS feature ID: 2412740
- Website: www.haydencolorado.com

The Town of Hayden is a home rule municipality located in Routt County, Colorado, United States. The town population was 1,941 at the 2020 United States census. Hayden is a part of the Steamboat Springs, CO Micropolitan Statistical Area. The town sits along U.S. Highway 40 in the Yampa River Valley between Craig and Steamboat Springs. Hayden is located near the Yampa Valley Regional Airport.

== History ==
The Ute people used the area for summer hunting before the town was settled. Trappers worked in the area in the early 1800s.

The area was first settled in 1875, with the town established in 1894 and incorporated in 1906. Hayden was named for F.V. Hayden, head of a survey party for the U.S. Geological & Geographic Survey in the late 1860s. Hayden explored western Colorado during the late nineteenth century.

The Denver and Salt Lake Railway reached Hayden by 1913, and the rail line continues on today as part of the Union Pacific Railroad.

Historically a center of coal mining and agriculture, it consists today of a small cluster of homes and businesses.

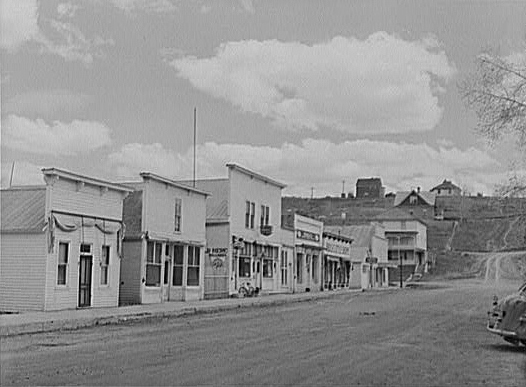
Hayden, Colorado, in 1942

== Geography ==
At the 2020 United States census, the town had a total area of 2,098 acres (8.490 km^{2}), all of it land.

=== Climate ===
The Town of Hayden has a Humid continental climate (Köppen climate classification Dfb), with warm summers, cold winters with heavy snow, and equal precipitation year-round. The frost-free growing season is short, averaging 107 days.

Climate data for Hayden, Colorado, 1991–2020 normals, extremes 1909–present
Month	Jan	Feb	Mar	Apr	May	Jun	Jul	Aug	Sep	Oct	Nov	Dec	Year
Record high °F (°C)	60 (16)	61 (16)	75 (24)	84 (29)	92 (33)	100 (38)	102 (39)	98 (37)	94 (34)	83 (28)	74 (23)	66 (19)	102 (39)
Mean maximum °F (°C)	43.8 (6.6)	48.5 (9.2)	63.1 (17.3)	74.1 (23.4)	82.5 (28.1)	89.6 (32.0)	92.8 (33.8)	90.9 (32.7)	86.4 (30.2)	77.4 (25.2)	64.5 (18.1)	47.5 (8.6)	93.4 (34.1)
Mean daily maximum °F (°C)	30.1 (−1.1)	35.0 (1.7)	47.2 (8.4)	58.2 (14.6)	68.5 (20.3)	79.4 (26.3)	85.8 (29.9)	83.5 (28.6)	75.3 (24.1)	61.6 (16.4)	45.4 (7.4)	31.3 (−0.4)	58.4 (14.7)
Daily mean °F (°C)	19.1 (−7.2)	23.5 (−4.7)	34.2 (1.2)	43.5 (6.4)	52.5 (11.4)	61.2 (16.2)	67.8 (19.9)	66.0 (18.9)	57.9 (14.4)	45.7 (7.6)	32.5 (0.3)	20.4 (−6.4)	43.7 (6.5)
Mean daily minimum °F (°C)	8.1 (−13.3)	12.1 (−11.1)	21.2 (−6.0)	28.8 (−1.8)	36.4 (2.4)	43.0 (6.1)	49.8 (9.9)	48.6 (9.2)	40.4 (4.7)	29.7 (−1.3)	19.7 (−6.8)	9.5 (−12.5)	28.9 (−1.7)
Mean minimum °F (°C)	−13.8 (−25.4)	−8.8 (−22.7)	2.6 (−16.3)	14.9 (−9.5)	25.1 (−3.8)	32.9 (0.5)	41.2 (5.1)	39.7 (4.3)	27.9 (−2.3)	14.2 (−9.9)	−0.2 (−17.9)	−11.4 (−24.1)	−18.6 (−28.1)
Record low °F (°C)	−45 (−43)	−44 (−42)	−25 (−32)	−5 (−21)	15 (−9)	21 (−6)	27 (−3)	28 (−2)	7 (−14)	−10 (−23)	−27 (−33)	−41 (−41)	−45 (−43)
Average precipitation inches (mm)	1.80 (46)	1.44 (37)	1.38 (35)	2.15 (55)	1.83 (46)	1.06 (27)	1.09 (28)	1.27 (32)	1.67 (42)	1.57 (40)	1.49 (38)	1.66 (42)	18.41 (468)
Average snowfall inches (cm)	26.3 (67)	17.9 (45)	12.6 (32)	10.0 (25)	1.4 (3.6)	0.1 (0.25)	0.0 (0.0)	0.0 (0.0)	0.2 (0.51)	5.0 (13)	15.7 (40)	23.8 (60)	113.0 (287)
Average extreme snow depth inches (cm)	19.9 (51)	21.5 (55)	16.9 (43)	5.0 (13)	0.5 (1.3)	0.0 (0.0)	0.0 (0.0)	0.0 (0.0)	0.0 (0.0)	1.9 (4.8)	6.4 (16)	13.2 (34)	22.9 (58)
Average precipitation days (≥ 0.01 in)	12.0	10.7	9.8	11.4	11.0	7.0	8.2	8.7	9.0	8.4	9.1	11.0	116.3
Average snowy days (≥ 0.1 in)	11.7	9.4	6.9	4.7	1.0	0.2	0.0	0.0	0.1	2.4	7.2	10.9	54.5
Source 1: NOAA
Source 2: National Weather Service

== Demographics ==
Historical population
Census	Pop.	Note	%±
1910	314		—
1920	455		44.9%
1930	554		21.8%
1940	640		15.5%
1950	767		19.8%
1960	764		−0.4%
1970	763		−0.1%
1980	1,720		125.4%
1990	1,444		−16.0%
2000	1,634		13.2%
2010	1,810		10.8%
2020	1,941		7.2%
U.S. Decennial Census

=== 2020 census ===
As of the 2020 census, Hayden had a population of 1,941. The median age was 36.9 years. 22.9% of residents were under the age of 18 and 13.0% of residents were 65 years of age or older. For every 100 females there were 105.4 males, and for every 100 females age 18 and over there were 107.1 males age 18 and over.

0.0% of residents lived in urban areas, while 100.0% lived in rural areas.

There were 790 households in Hayden, of which 30.6% had children under the age of 18 living in them. Of all households, 48.5% were married-couple households, 22.2% were households with a male householder and no spouse or partner present, and 21.5% were households with a female householder and no spouse or partner present. About 27.8% of all households were made up of individuals and 7.5% had someone living alone who was 65 years of age or older.

There were 847 housing units, of which 6.7% were vacant. The homeowner vacancy rate was 1.2% and the rental vacancy rate was 8.5%.

Racial composition as of the 2020 census
Race	Number	Percent
White	1,683	86.7%
Black or African American	9	0.5%
American Indian and Alaska Native	11	0.6%
Asian	10	0.5%
Native Hawaiian and Other Pacific Islander	8	0.4%
Some other race	59	3.0%
Two or more races	161	8.3%
Hispanic or Latino (of any race)	211	10.9%

=== 2000 census ===
As of the census of 2000, there were 1,634 people, 618 households, and 443 families residing in the town. The population density was 664.1 inhabitants per square mile (256.4/km^{2}). There were 658 housing units at an average density of 267.4 per square mile (103.2/km^{2}). The racial makeup of the town was 96.02% White, 0.12% African American, 0.61% Native American, 0.12% Asian, 0.06% Pacific Islander, 1.96% from other races, and 1.10% from two or more races. Hispanic or Latino of any race were 5.69% of the population.

There were 618 households, out of which 42.1% had children under the age of 18 living with them, 57.1% were married couples living together, 9.4% had a female householder with no husband present, and 28.2% were non-families. 21.7% of all households were made up of individuals, and 5.5% had someone living alone who was 65 years of age or older. The average household size was 2.63 and the average family size was 3.08.

In the town, the population was spread out, with 30.3% under the age of 18, 9.5% from 18 to 24, 33.1% from 25 to 44, 20.9% from 45 to 64, and 6.1% who were 65 years of age or older. The median age was 32 years. For every 100 females, there were 104.5 males. For every 100 females age 18 and over, there were 100.2 males.

The median income for a household in the town was $42,147, and the median income for a family was $45,962. Males had a median income of $38,150 versus $23,359 for females. The per capita income for the town was $18,574. About 5.4% of families and 7.0% of the population were below the poverty line, including 8.2% of those under age 18 and 7.4% of those age 65 or over.

== Education ==
The community is in the Hayden School District RE-1.

== Notable people ==
- Earl Bascom (1906-1995) - Hollywood actor, artist, rodeo pioneer who lived in Hayden in the 1930s.
- Frank Tenney Johnson (1874-1939) - painter of the Old American West, known for his "moonlight painting" technique.

== See also ==
- Steamboat Springs-Craig, CO Combined Statistical Area
- Steamboat Springs, CO Micropolitan Statistical Area
