= Leadville National Fish Hatchery =

- U.S. National Register of Historic Places
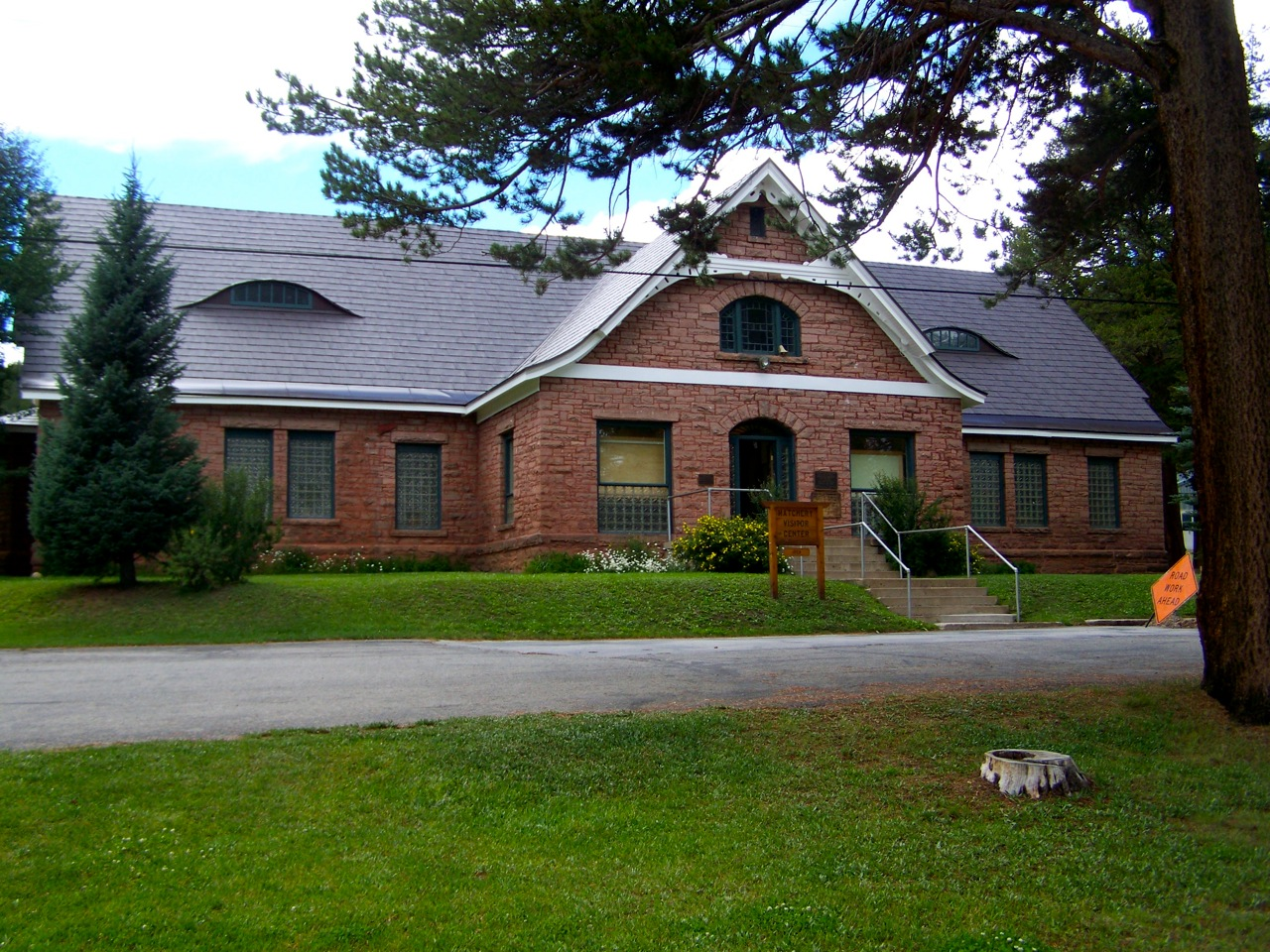
- Leadville Hatchery Building

- Location within Colorado Location within the United States
- Location: Lake County, Colorado
- Nearest city: Leadville, Colorado
- Coordinates: 39°13′31″N 106°23′32″W
- Area: 0.3 acres (0.12 ha)
- Built: 1890
- Architect: Hunt, L.J.; Gorham, John
- NRHP reference No.: 80000908
- Added to NRHP: May 29, 1980

Leadville National Fish Hatchery established in 1889 west of Leadville, Colorado, is one of 70 hatcheries in the National Fish Hatchery System. It is managed by the United States Fish and Wildlife Service. It lies within the Mount Massive Wilderness, most of whose area lies within San Isabel National Forest and which is managed by the United States Forest Service.

Leadville National Fish Hatchery was listed on the National Register of Historic Places in 1980.

== See also ==
- National Register of Historic Places listings in Lake County, Colorado
