= Poncha Springs, Colorado =

Town in Colorado, United States

Town of Poncha Springs, Colorado
- Town
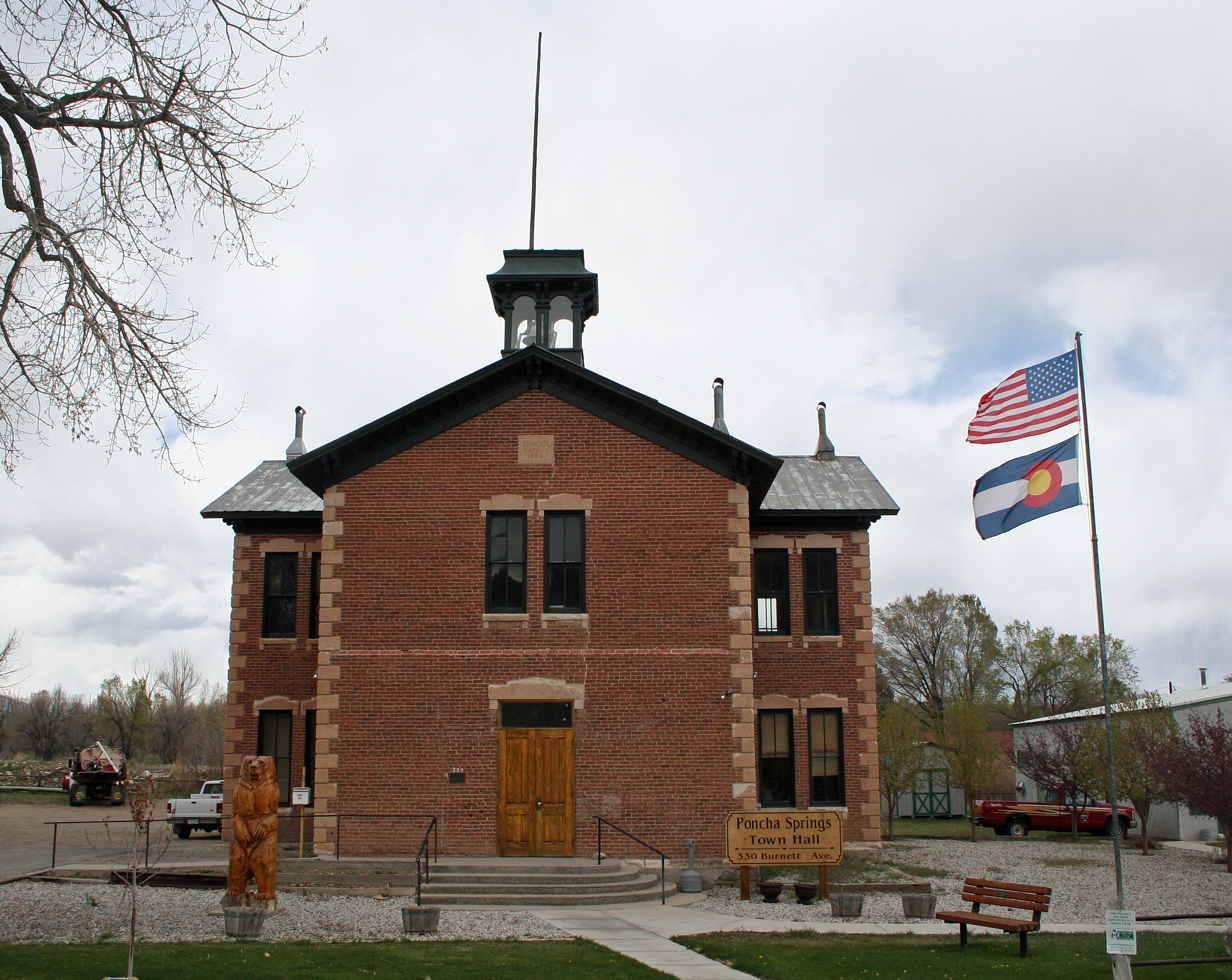
- The Poncha Springs Town Hall, formerly a school
- Nickname: Crossroads of the Rockies
- Location of Poncha Springs in Chaffee County, Colorado.
- Coordinates: 38°30′34″N 106°07′32″W
- Country: United States
- State: Colorado
- County: Chaffee
- Incorporated (town): December 16, 1880

Government
  - Type: Statutory town

Area
  - Total: 2.98 sq mi (7.73 km^{2})
  - Land: 2.98 sq mi (7.73 km^{2})
  - Water: 0 sq mi (0.00 km^{2})
- Elevation: 7,477 ft (2,279 m)

Population (2020)
  - Total: 925
  - Density: 310/sq mi (120/km^{2})
- Time zone: UTC-7 (Mountain (MST))
  - Summer (DST): UTC-6 (MDT)
- ZIP code: 81242 (PO Box)
- Area code: 719
- FIPS code: 08-60600
- GNIS feature ID: 2412495
- Website: www.ponchasprings.us

Poncha Springs is a statutory town in Chaffee County, Colorado. Originally settled by fur traders, it became an Indian trading post in 1866, and was incorporated on December 8, 1880. It has been nicknamed the "Crossroads of the Rockies" in reference to the intersection of US 50 and US 285 through the center of town. As of 2024 its population was 1,406.

== History ==
In 1779, Juan Bautista de Anza led a military expedition over Poncha Pass, about 6 miles (10 km) south of the present-day town's location. Before that, the Ute people used the area as camping grounds during the winter months. Following the Spanish exploration, French trappers and fur traders moved in. In 1855, Colonel Thomas T. Fauntleroy and the 1st Cavalry Regiment marched over Poncha Pass and engaged a group of Utes between present day Salida and Poncha Springs as part of the Ute Wars.

Prospectors began arriving around 1860, notably Bob Hendricks and Nat Rich, who built the first cabin in town. In 1866, an Indian agent named John Burnett constructed a log building on his ranch to serve as an Indian trading post. The Hutchinson and McPherson families also homesteaded the area around the same time. John McPherson purchased Nat Rich's squatting rights from Joe Hutchinson and built a grocery store. In 1867, Poncha Springs was designated as an election precinct, and it was incorporated on December 8, 1880.

=== Hot springs ===
While the European discovery of the Poncha hot springs is widely disputed, the first spring-fed bath was built by John Burnett, Henry Weber, and Paul Irvine in 1868 by digging a large pit and lining it with logs to contain the water. The springs became a popular attraction when a railroad was built through, and two hotels were constructed on the site. Both have since burned down.

In 1904, a year after the last fire, the Holman family took over management of the springs, which now featured a hand-plastered rock pool, two cabins, two baths, and a sleeping room. From 1927 to 1935, the springs were operated by Donald Hartwich until the City of Salida took ownership and the W.P.A. capped the springs with cement.

== Poncha Springs Schoolhouse ==
- Poncha Springs Schoolhouse
- U.S. National Register of Historic Places
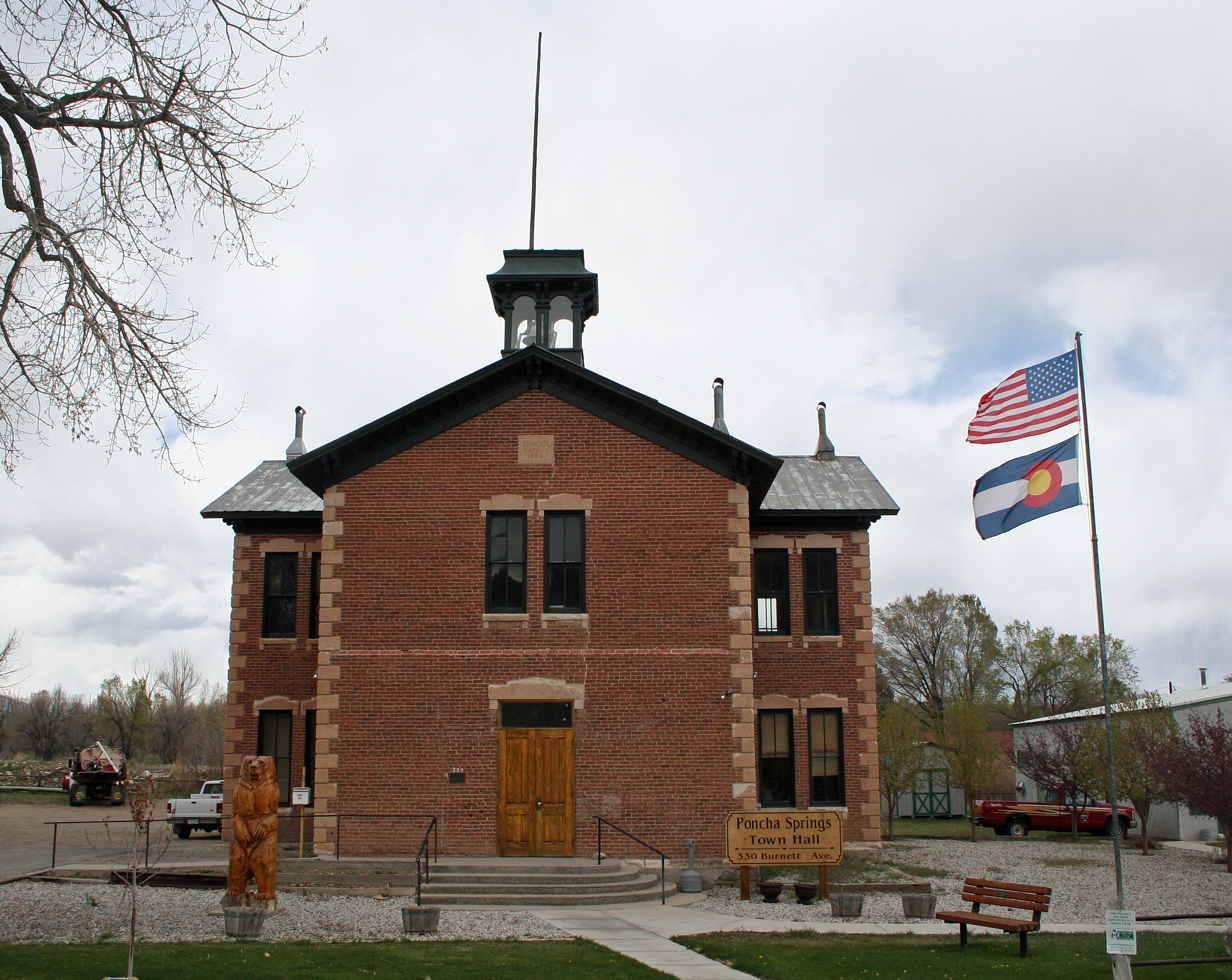
- Schoolhouse in 2010
- Location: 330 Burnett St., near Poncha Springs, Colorado in Chaffee County, Colorado
- Area: less than one acre
- Built by: C.B. Furnash, C.B.; Robert Smith
- Architectural style: Italianate
- MPS: Rural School Buildings in Colorado MPS
- NRHP reference No.: 89002375
- Added to NRHP: January 25, 1990

The Poncha Springs Schoolhouse is a two-story T-shaped building built in 1883 in an Italianate style with prominent quoins and a belvedere style cupola and bell tower. It was added to the National Register of Historic Places in 1989 and served as the town hall until 2017.

== Geography ==
The town has a total area of 2.98 square miles of land.

== See also ==
- Colorado cities and towns
