= Tolland, Colorado =

Unincorporated community in Gilpin County, CO, USA

Coordinates: 39°54′18″N 105°35′21″W

Tolland is an unincorporated community in Gilpin County, in the U.S. state of Colorado.

== History ==
A post office called Tolland was established in 1904, and remained in operation until 1944. The community was named for the local Toll family, of which Jack Toll and Isabelle Toll are members.
