= Craig, Colorado =

City in Colorado, US

- Home rule city
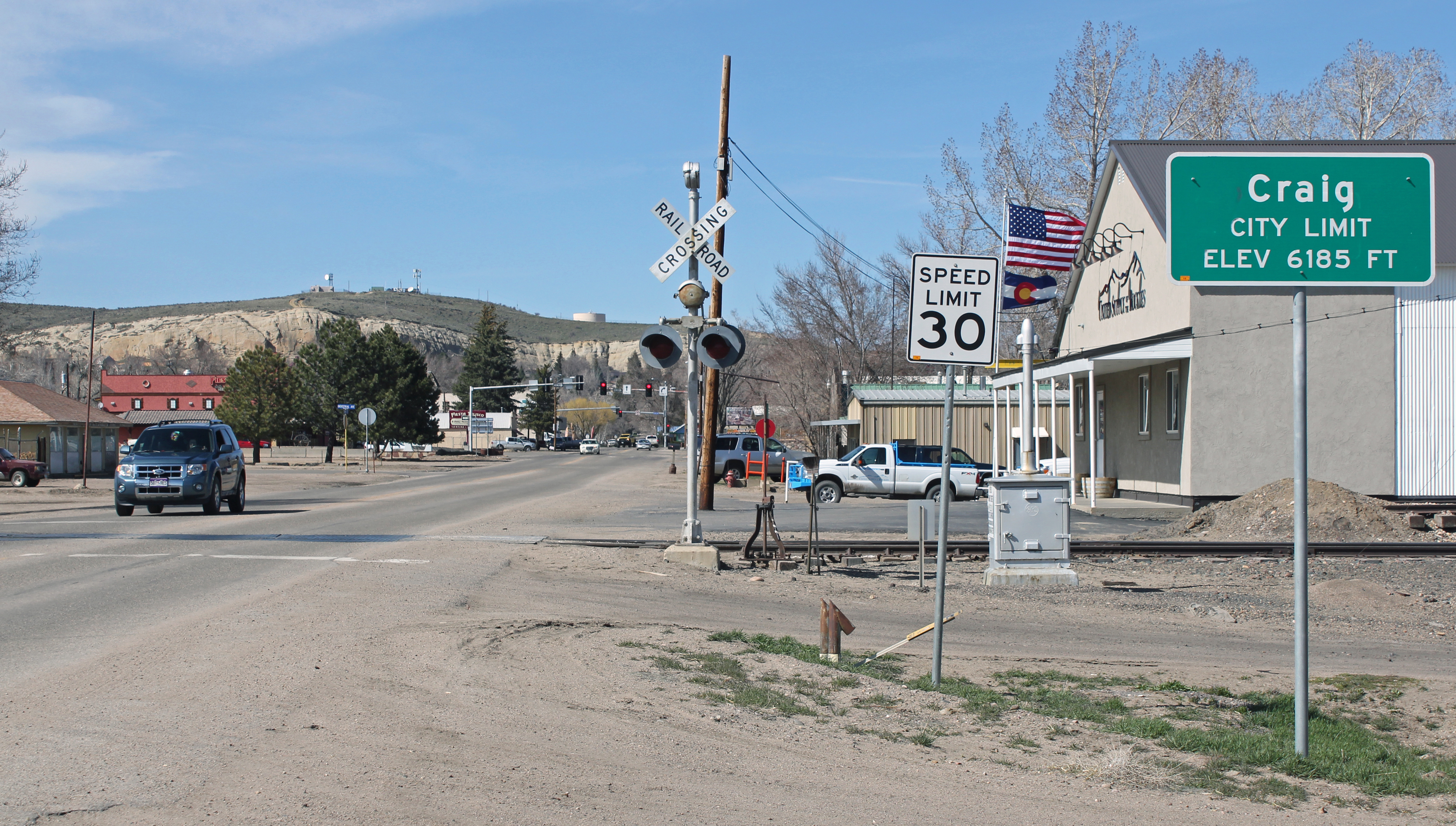
- Entering Craig from the south on South Ranney Street
- Motto: "Colorado's Great Northwest"
- Location of Craig in Moffat County, Colorado
- Coordinates: 40°31′01″N 107°33′19″W
- Country: United States
- State: Colorado
- County: Moffat
- Incorporated: July 15, 1908

Government
  - Type: Home rule city

Area
  - Total: 5.073 sq mi (13.138 km^{2})
  - Land: 5.073 sq mi (13.138 km^{2})
  - Water: 0 sq mi (0 km^{2})
- Elevation: 6,198 ft (1,889 m)

Population (2020)
  - Total: 9,060
  - Density: 1,786/sq mi (690/km^{2})
- Time zone: UTC−07:00 (MST)
  - Summer (DST): UTC−06:00 (MDT)
- ZIP code: 81625 and 81626 (PO Box)
- Area codes: 970/748
- GNIS city ID: 2410255
- FIPS code: 08-17760
- Website: www.ci.craig.co.us

Craig is a home rule city that is the county seat of and the most populous municipality in Moffat County, Colorado, United States. The city population was 9,060 at the 2020 United States census.

== History ==
Craig was founded by William H. Tucker. The Craig, Colorado, post office opened on August 28, 1889. Craig was incorporated as a city on July 15, 1908. The town was named for one of the town's financial backers, Reverend William Bayard Craig (1848–1916).

Craig became the county seat when Moffat County was created out of the western portion of Routt County on February 27, 1911. In the same area as Craig, at the confluence of the Yampa River (then known as the Bear River) and Fortification Creek, were previous towns known as Yampa (as early as 1885) and Windsor (as early as 1878). In 1878, the area consisted of a number of ranches and at least two businesses: Himley's Ferry (which allowed crossing of the Yampa River) and Peck's Store (a one-room trading post).

In the 1970s and early 1980s, the largest power generation plant in Colorado and several coal mines were constructed near Craig.

Craig is, according to the local chamber of commerce, "Elk Hunting Capital of the World".

== Geography ==
At the 2020 United States census, the city had a total area of 3,246 acres (13.138 km^{2}), all of which was land.

=== Climate ===
Under the Köppen climate classification, Craig has a humid continental climate (Dfb). Summer days are hot with cool nights and very high diurnal temperature variation, while winters are cold and snowy with lows falling to or below 0 °F (−17.8 °C) on 22 mornings, and maxima not topping freezing on 54 afternoons. Snowfall averages 76.2 inches or 1.9 meters, with a range from 47.8 inches (1.2 m) between July 1980 and June 1981, up to 108.0 inches (2.7 m) between July 1973 and June 1974, and a highest monthly snowfall of 45.5 inches or 1.2 meters in January 1996. The most snow on the ground has been 26 inches or 0.66 meters on February 7, 2020.

The wettest calendar year in total precipitation has been 1983 with 24.97 inches or 634.2 millimeters and the driest complete year 1958 with 7.43 inches or 188.7 millimeters. The most precipitation in one month occurred in September 1997 when 5.19 inches or 131.8 millimeters fell.

Climate data for Craig, Colorado, 1991–2020 normals, extremes 1910–present
Month	Jan	Feb	Mar	Apr	May	Jun	Jul	Aug	Sep	Oct	Nov	Dec	Year
Record high °F (°C)	57 (14)	63 (17)	76 (24)	81 (27)	88 (31)	100 (38)	99 (37)	98 (37)	97 (36)	94 (34)	73 (23)	64 (18)	100 (38)
Mean maximum °F (°C)	43.8 (6.6)	49.9 (9.9)	64.3 (17.9)	73.4 (23.0)	80.7 (27.1)	89.9 (32.2)	93.5 (34.2)	91.5 (33.1)	86.4 (30.2)	77.4 (25.2)	64.2 (17.9)	48.6 (9.2)	94.3 (34.6)
Mean daily maximum °F (°C)	30.3 (−0.9)	35.3 (1.8)	46.9 (8.3)	56.0 (13.3)	65.7 (18.7)	77.8 (25.4)	85.2 (29.6)	83.2 (28.4)	74.6 (23.7)	60.6 (15.9)	44.8 (7.1)	31.9 (−0.1)	57.7 (14.3)
Daily mean °F (°C)	18.6 (−7.4)	23.0 (−5.0)	33.4 (0.8)	41.5 (5.3)	50.6 (10.3)	60.3 (15.7)	67.4 (19.7)	65.7 (18.7)	57.0 (13.9)	44.4 (6.9)	31.6 (−0.2)	20.3 (−6.5)	42.8 (6.0)
Mean daily minimum °F (°C)	7.0 (−13.9)	10.8 (−11.8)	19.9 (−6.7)	27.0 (−2.8)	35.5 (1.9)	42.8 (6.0)	49.6 (9.8)	48.2 (9.0)	39.3 (4.1)	28.3 (−2.1)	18.4 (−7.6)	8.8 (−12.9)	28.0 (−2.3)
Mean minimum °F (°C)	−14.0 (−25.6)	−8.0 (−22.2)	4.9 (−15.1)	15.3 (−9.3)	25.2 (−3.8)	34.3 (1.3)	42.6 (5.9)	40.5 (4.7)	29.5 (−1.4)	13.2 (−10.4)	−0.7 (−18.2)	−11.3 (−24.1)	−18.5 (−28.1)
Record low °F (°C)	−45 (−43)	−43 (−42)	−24 (−31)	−2 (−19)	14 (−10)	20 (−7)	29 (−2)	28 (−2)	12 (−11)	−10 (−23)	−19 (−28)	−31 (−35)	−45 (−43)
Average precipitation inches (mm)	0.91 (23)	0.89 (23)	0.99 (25)	1.67 (42)	1.63 (41)	0.99 (25)	0.93 (24)	0.97 (25)	1.75 (44)	1.48 (38)	0.99 (25)	0.90 (23)	14.10 (358)
Average snowfall inches (cm)	15.5 (39)	13.4 (34)	12.2 (31)	5.8 (15)	0.8 (2.0)	0.1 (0.25)	0.0 (0.0)	0.0 (0.0)	0.3 (0.76)	2.9 (7.4)	10.6 (27)	14.6 (37)	76.2 (193.41)
Average extreme snow depth inches (cm)	11 (28)	10 (25)	7 (18)	3 (7.6)	1 (2.5)	0 (0)	0 (0)	0 (0)	0 (0)	2 (5.1)	5 (13)	9 (23)	13 (33)
Average precipitation days (≥ 0.01 in)	8.8	7.6	8.9	8.7	9.2	7.1	6.8	7.9	8.0	7.7	8.5	8.2	97.4
Average snowy days (≥ 0.1 in)	8.3	6.4	5.6	2.4	0.6	0.1	0.0	0.0	0.1	1.4	5.3	6.9	37.0
Source 1: NOAA (precip days, snow/snow days 1981–2010)
Source 2: National Weather Service

== Demographics ==
Historical population
Census	Pop.	Note	%±
1910	392		—
1920	1,297		230.9%
1930	1,418		9.3%
1940	2,123		49.7%
1950	3,080		45.1%
1960	3,984		29.4%
1970	4,205		5.5%
1980	8,133		93.4%
1990	8,091		−0.5%
2000	9,189		13.6%
2010	9,464		3.0%
2020	9,060		−4.3%
U.S. Decennial Census

Craig is included in the Steamboat Springs micropolitan statistical area as one of its principal cities.

=== 2020 census ===
As of the 2020 census, Craig had a population of 9,060. The median age was 36.1 years. 25.8% of residents were under the age of 18 and 15.0% of residents were 65 years of age or older. For every 100 females there were 104.0 males, and for every 100 females age 18 and over there were 101.4 males age 18 and over.

99.8% of residents lived in urban areas, while 0.2% lived in rural areas.

There were 3,703 households in Craig, of which 32.9% had children under the age of 18 living in them. Of all households, 44.1% were married-couple households, 23.5% were households with a male householder and no spouse or partner present, and 24.8% were households with a female householder and no spouse or partner present. About 30.0% of all households were made up of individuals and 11.3% had someone living alone who was 65 years of age or older.

There were 4,037 housing units, of which 8.3% were vacant. The homeowner vacancy rate was 2.0% and the rental vacancy rate was 9.4%.

Racial composition as of the 2020 census
Race	Number	Percent
White	7,158	79.0%
Black or African American	71	0.8%
American Indian and Alaska Native	101	1.1%
Asian	40	0.4%
Native Hawaiian and Other Pacific Islander	2	0.0%
Some other race	654	7.2%
Two or more races	1,034	11.4%
Hispanic or Latino (of any race)	1,727	19.1%

=== 2000 census ===
As of the census of 2000, there were 9,189 people, 3,525 households, and 2,432 families residing in the city. The population density was 1,886.6 inhabitants per square mile (728.4/km^{2}). There were 3,851 housing units at an average density of 790.6 units per square mile (305.3 units/km^{2}). The racial makeup of the city was 92.56% White, 0.30% African American, 0.96% Native American, 0.42% Asian, 0.02% Pacific Islander, 3.84% from other races, and 1.89% from two or more races. Hispanic or Latino of any race were 10.80% of the population.

There were 3,525 households, out of which 38.3% had children under the age of 18 living with them, 54.3% were married couples living together, 9.6% had a female householder with no husband present, and 31.0% were non-families. 25.9% of all households were made up of individuals, and 8.9% had someone living alone who was 65 years of age or older. The average household size was 2.53 and the average family size was 3.05.

In the city, the population was spread out, with 28.5% under the age of 18, 9.6% from 18 to 24, 30.1% from 25 to 44, 21.9% from 45 to 64, and 9.9% who were 65 years of age or older. The median age was 34 years. For every 100 females, there were 106.3 males. For every 100 females age 18 and over, there were 103.4 males.

The median income for a household in the city was $41,091, and the median income for a family was $45,504. Males had a median income of $38,038 versus $21,806 for females. The per capita income for the city was $18,140. About 6.9% of families and 8.6% of the population were below the poverty line, including 10.5% of those under age 18 and 6.5% of those age 65 or over.

== Education ==
Craig is served by the Moffat County School District, which operates five schools in the city:

- Ridgeview Elementary School
- Sandrock Elementary School
- Sunset Elementary School
- Craig Middle School
- Moffat County High School

The city is also home to a campus of Colorado Northwestern Community College.

== Transportation ==
Craig is the terminus of a Union Pacific Railroad (UP) branch line that connects with the UP main line at Bond. The line was originally built by the Denver and Salt Lake Railway to connect Denver with Salt Lake City but was only completed as far west as Craig. As of August 2024, the Colorado Department of Transportation (CDOT) is studying state-run passenger train service between Denver and Craig via Winter Park and Steamboat Springs.

U.S. 40 is the primary east–west highway serving Craig, while Colorado State Highway 13 runs south to Interstate 70 and north to the Wyoming border, where it becomes Wyoming State Highway 789 and eventually connects with Interstate 80.

Craig-Moffat Airport is the local airfield. Scheduled passenger jet airline service is available at the Yampa Valley Airport, located near the town of Hayden, 15 miles (24 km) east of Craig.

Steamboat Springs Transit's regional bus service has multiple daily roundtrips between Craig and Steamboat Springs via Hayden, Milner, and Steamboat II, while CDOT's Bustang Outrider intercity bus service has one daily Craig–Denver roundtrip.

== Notable people ==
- Edwin C. Johnson (January 1, 1884 – May 30, 1970) was an American politician of the Democratic Party who served as both governor of and U.S. senator from the state of Colorado.
- Jennifer LeRoy (b. January 7, 1974) is an American model and actress. She was chosen as Playboy's Playmate of the Month in February 1993.
- Alan Magill (November 26, 1953 – September 19, 2015) was an American parasitologist.
- Chance Phelps (July 14, 1984 – April 9, 2004) was a lance corporal in the United States Marine Corps who became known when Lt. Col. Michael Strobl escorted his remains from Iraq. Lt. Col. Strobl recorded his account of the escort in "Taking Chance", an article which was later made into a full-length movie by HBO under the same title.
- Dennis Preece (March 4, 1940 - April 25, 1997) was a Hall of Fame wrestling coach who attended the local high school in Craig, Colorado graduating in 1958.
- Angus Ellis Taylor (October 13, 1911 – April 6, 1999) was a mathematician and chancellor of UC Santa Cruz.

== See also ==
- Steamboat Springs, CO Micropolitan Statistical Area
