= Colorado State Highway 100 =

State highway in Vilas, Colorado, United States

State Highway 100
- SH 100 highlighted in red

Route information
- Maintained by CDOT
- Length: 0.419 mi (674 m)

Major junctions
- South end: Main Street in Vilas
- North end: US 160 in Vilas

Location
- Country: United States
- State: Colorado
- Counties: Baca

Highway system
- Colorado State Highway System; Interstate; US; State; Scenic
← SH 97	→ SH 101

State Highway 100 (SH 100) is a 0.419-mile (0.674 km) state highway entirely within Vilas, Colorado, United States, that connects Main Street with U.S. Route 160 (US 160).

== Route description ==
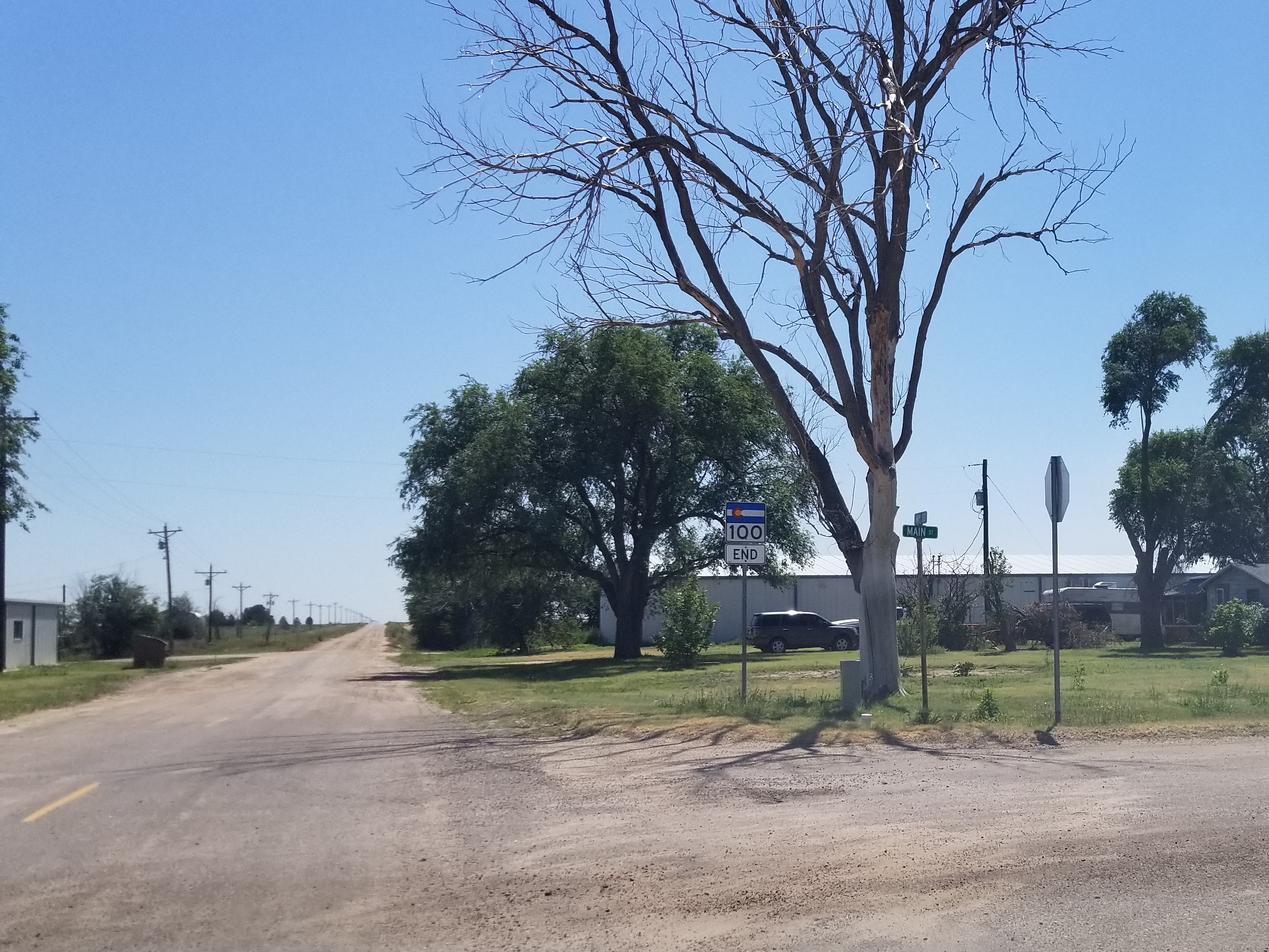
South at the southern terminus of SH 100, August 2019

SH 100 begins at an intersection with Main Street and the southern part of County Road 36 (CR 36) in the central part of Vilas. (East Main Street heads east to the eastern edge of town before becoming a county road. West Main Street heads west for one block before ending at Collingwood Avenue. CR 36 heads south to end near the Oklahoma state line.) From its southern terminus, SH 100 heads north to cross Pine Street and connect with the east end of West Cedar Street before leaving the residential part of town. Continuing north SH 100 passes through agricultural area before reaching its northern terminus at an intersection with US 160 and the northern part of CR 36, near the northern edge of town. (US 160 heads east toward Walsh and Johnson City, Kansas. US 160 heads west toward Pritchett and Kim. CR 160 heads briefly north to end at another county road.)

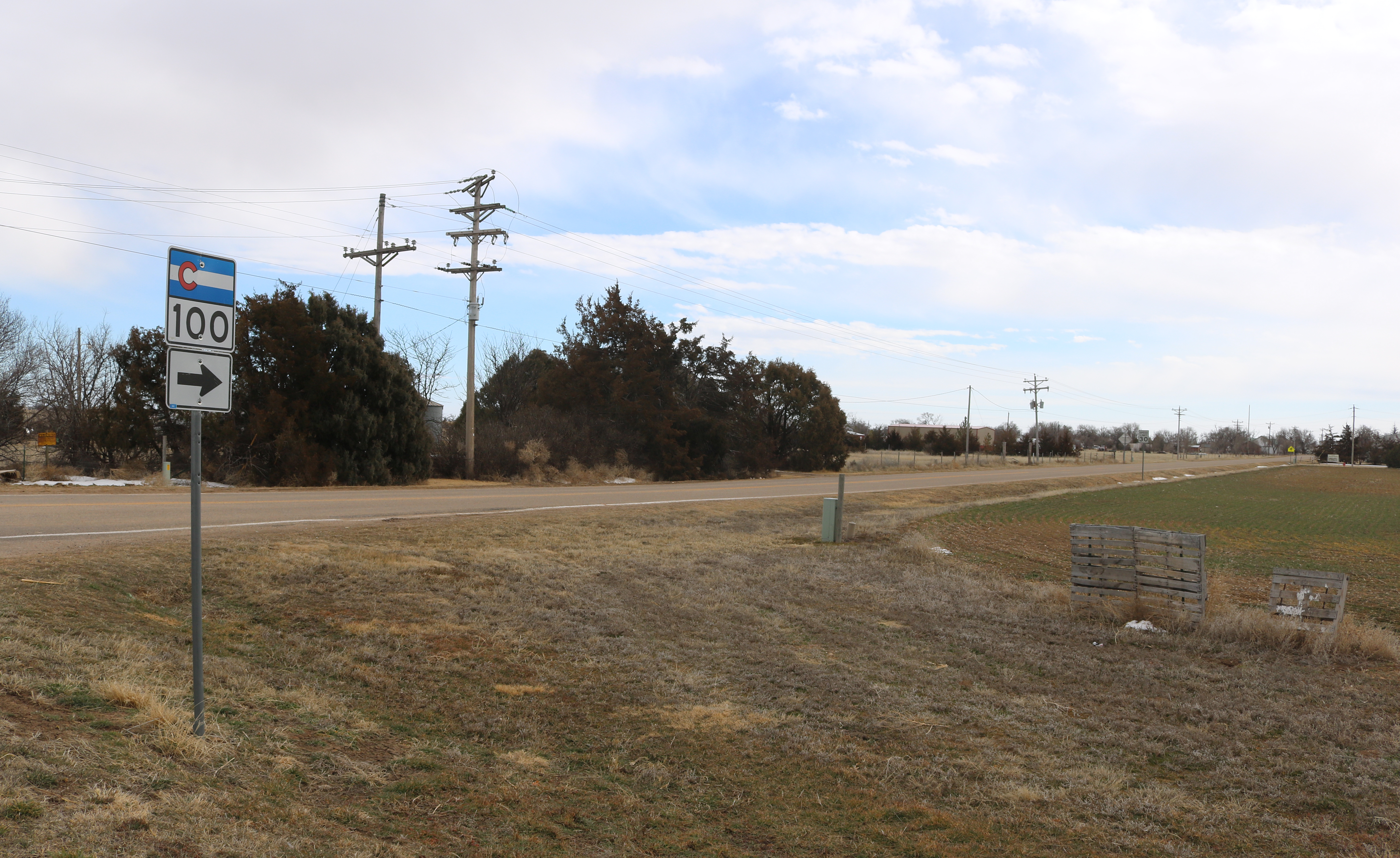
East from U.S. Route 160 at the northern terminus of SH 100, March 2019

== Major intersections ==
The entire route is in Vilas, Baca County.

mi	km	Destinations	Notes
0.000	0.000	CR 36 south	Continuation south beyond southern terminus
0.000	0.000	Main Street	Southern terminus
0.419	0.674	US 160 – Walsh, Johnson (Kansas), Pritchett, Kim	Northern terminus
0.419	0.674	CR 36 south	Continuation north beyond northern terminus
1.000 mi = 1.609 km; 1.000 km = 0.621 mi

== See also ==
- List of state highways in Colorado
