= List of state highways in Colorado =

State Highways in Colorado
- State highway signs for SH 5 (1926), SH 30 (1946), SH 50 (1952), and modern-day SH 83 and SH 470
- State highways highlighted in red with former SH 2 and future SH 21 highlighted in blue; for SH 470, free segment in green with E 470 in red

Highway names
- Interstates: Interstate X (I-X)
- US Highways: U.S. Highway X (US X)
- State: State Highway X (SH X)

System links
- Colorado State Highway System; Interstate; US; State; Scenic

The state highways of Colorado are a system of public paved roads funded and maintained by the Colorado Department of Transportation (CDOT) in the U.S. state of Colorado. These are state highways, which are typically abbreviated SH. The numbered highways within the state begin at 1 and increase, with exception of numbers already designated as United States Numbered Highways or Interstate Highways. In 1953, many highways were decommissioned or lost mileage. Before the 1968 Colorado state highway renumbering, highways were cosigned with U.S. Highways and Interstate Highways, and there were highways matching U.S. Highway and Interstate Highway numbers.

== Description ==
Sample highway shield used today for numbered highways

The numbered state highway system covers approximately 3,135 miles of road in Colorado, subtracting the total miles of Interstate and US Highways from 9,100 miles of the state highway system. These are maintained using state funds which are collected by state and federal gas tax and a portion of vehicle registration fees. Unlike the numbering systems of the Interstate Highway System and the United States Numbered Highway System handled by the American Association of State Highway and Transportation Officials (AASHTO), the numbered state highway system is a separate system used by the state. The route markers used are separate from neighboring states rather than being consistent. In Colorado, the route markers are designed with the state flag on the top half and the number on the bottom half.

Most state highways are generally two lane roads with speed limits up to 65 miles per hour in rural areas but can drop as low as 30 miles per hour in served communities. In urban areas, they can be six to eight lane expressways primarily in Denver and Colorado Springs. Some numbered routes are concurrent with US highways and Interstate Highways and concurrent sections of state highway are not recognized by CDOT. Concurrent sections generally have their mileage based on the Interstate or US Route mileage (e.g. SH 88 being concurrent with I-25) and are sometimes unsigned. The longest state highway is State Highway 14 with a span of nearly 237 miles (381 km) between Muddy Pass and Sterling. State Highway 110 is the shortest route maintained by CDOT with a span of 0.186 miles (0.299 km).

The Colorado Department of Transportation (CDOT) is the agency responsible for maintaining the Colorado State Highway System, including Interstate Highways, United States Numbered Highways, and numbered state highways within the state of Colorado.

== State highways ==
Number	Length (mi) (Note: Lengths do not reflect mileposts completely as some routes do not start at mile 0)	Length (km)	Southern or western terminus	Northern or eastern terminus	Formed	Removed	Notes
SH 1	10.053	16.179	US 287 near Fort Collins	I-25 at Wellington	c. 1923	current	Was a cross state highway that ran from New Mexico to Wyoming until 1968. Turned back sections are now I-25, US 85, and US 287
SH 2	19.944	32.097	US 285 at Denver	I-76 near Brighton	c. 1923	current	Until 1968, went west to Utah via US 40 and northeast to Nebraska via US 6 and US 138; rerouted south of US 40 in 1968; extended north to SH 7 in 1998, but that section was given to the city of Brighton in 2010
SH 3	82.745	133.165	US 85 at the Wyoming border	I-80S in Henderson	c. 1923	1968	Carrier route overlapping US 85
SH 3	2.44	3.93	US 160/US 550 near Durango	US 160/US 550 near Durango	c. 1981	current	
SH 4	—	—	Utah border	Kansas border	c. 1923	1968	Carrier route overlapping US 24
SH 5	8.77	14.11	US 87 West of Carr	US 85 East of Carr	c. 1923	1938	Now CR 126
SH 5	—	—	SH 259 near Windsor	Galeton	c. 1938	1953	Now CR 74
SH 5	—	—	Iliff Avenue in Denver	SH 70 in Denver	c. 1953	1954	Syracuse Way, Denver
SH 5	14.89	23.96	Summit of Mount Blue Sky	SH 103 near Idaho Springs	1954	current	Highest paved road in North America
SH 6	—	—	Grand Junction	Kansas border	c. 1923	1968	Carrier route overlapping US 50
SH 7	81.64	131.39	US 36 in Estes Park	I-76 in Brighton	c. 1923	current	
SH 8	8.68	13.97	US 285 near Morrison	SH 121 at Lakewood	c. 1923	current	Until 1968, continued southwest to US 24/SH 4 via US 285 and continued east to Kansas via Wadsworth Avenue, Jewell Avenue, Pierce Street, Mississippi Avenue, Morrison Road, Alameda Avenue, I-25, and US 40
SH 9	138.92	223.57	US 50 near Cañon City	US 40 in Kremmling	c. 1923	current	Until 1953, continued via Royal Gorge to Cañon City
SH 10	71.96	115.81	I-25/US 160 at Walsenburg	US 50 at La Junta	c. 1923	current	Until 1968, continued west to Utah via US 160 and US 491
SH 11	—	—	US 6 at Wolcott	SH 9 at Kremmling	c. 1923	1953	southern portion replaced by SH 131; remainder is now Through Road / CR 1
SH 11	—	—	Nevada Avenue in Colorado Springs	Nevada Avenue in Colorado Springs	c. 1958	1968	Carrier route overlapping I-25
SH 11	1.35	2.17	US 138 at Julesburg	Nebraska state line	c. 1970	current	
SH 12	70.36	113.23	US 160 at La Veta	I-25 at Trinidad	c. 1923	current	Until 1968, continued northeast to La Junta via US 350
SH 13	127.99	205.98	I-70 near Rifle	WYO 789 near Baggs	c. 1923	current	
SH 14	236.92	381.29	US 40 at Muddy Pass	US 6 at Sterling	c. 1923	current	Until 1968, continued east via US 6 to Nebraska
SH 15	30.92	49.76	US 160/US 285 in Monte Vista	US 285 in La Jara	c. 1923	current	
SH 16	—	—	US 40 in Granby	US 6 in Wiggins	c. 1923	1968	Carrier route overlapping US 34
SH 16	1.31	2.11	I-25 in Security	SH 21 in Widefield	1971	current	Extended east from Syracuse Street to SH 21 (which was created that same day) in October 2007
SH 17	88.5	142.4	New Mexico state line	US 285 south of Villa Grove	c. 1923	current	
SH 18	—	—	Julesburg Reservoir near Sedgwick	US 138 in Ovid	c. 1938	1953	
SH 18	—	—	I-25 in Pueblo	US 50 near Avondale	c. 1958	1968	Carrier route overlapping US 50
SH 18	0.29	0.47	Spruce Mountain Road	Jct I-25 Exit 172 near Larkspur	1973	c. 1999	Signage not removed until 2001; now Upper Lake Gulch Road; was among the shortest state highways with a length of 1531 feet
SH 19	—	—	New Mexico border	US 50 in Montrose	c. 1923	1968	Carrier route overlapping US 550
SH 20	—	—	SH 119 west of Golden	SH 58/SH 93 in Golden	c. 1934	c. 1951	Replaced by US 6
SH 20	—	—	BL 70/US 6/US 50 in Grand Junction	US 6 in Palisade	c. 1956	1968	Replaced by parts of BL 70, US 6, and US 50
SH 21	—	—	US 85 near Platteville	US 85 near Platteville	c. 1923	1939	Loop east of US 85 through Platteville
SH 21	—	—	Near Paoli	Near Paoli	c. 1938	1953	Spurs north and south off US 6
SH 21	—	—	Loyd	SH 13 south of Hamilton	c. 1953	1954	
SH 21	—	—	Nebraska border	SH 14 near Stoneham	c. 1954	1964	Became part of SH 71
SH 21	20.56	33.09	SH 16 (Mesa Ridge Parkway) in Security-Widefield	SH 83 near Black Forest	2007	current	Established in October 2007 and is co-signed with Powers Boulevard
SH 22	—	—	20th Street in Greeley	Current BL 34 in Greeley	c. 1936	1953	
SH 22	2.47	3.98	Brighton Road in Henderson	Sable Boulevard near Brighton	c. 1953	current	
SH 23	—	—	US 138 in Ovid	Nebraska state line	c. 1938	1953	
SH 23	—	—	SH 62 in Ridgway	US 550 near Ouray	c. 1953	1989	Now CR 23 and CR 3A
SH 23	17.83	28.69	US 385 in Holyoke	N-23 at the Nebraska state line	1989	current	Renumbered from SH 176 to avoid confusion with nearby I-76 and to match Nebraska
SH 24	—	—	US 6 west of Holyoke	US 385 south of Holyoke	c. 1938	1953	
SH 24	—	—	104th Avenue and Colorado Boulevard in Thornton	SH 2 in Commerce City	c. 1953	1968	Renumbered to SH 44 to avoid confusion with US 24
SH 25	—	—	Logan CR 81	US 138 in Crook	c. 1938	1968	Renumbered to SH 55 to avoid confusion with I-25
SH 26	—	—	—	—	c. 1938	c. 1940	
SH 26	—	—	—	—	c. 1940	1953	
SH 26	—	—	—	—	c. 1953	1965	
SH 26	2.82	4.54	SH 95 in Denver	I-25 in Denver	c. 1966	current	
SH 27	—	—	—	—	c. 1938	1953	
SH 27	—	—	—	—	c. 1953	1956	
SH 27	—	—	—	—	c. 1956	1968	Carrier route for US 85–87
SH 28	—	—	—	—	c. 1938	1953	
SH 28	1.47	2.37	CR 25E at Bellvue	US 287 (now CR 54G) near Laporte	c. 1953	c. 1989	Turned back to the county when the US 287 Laporte bypass was built; now CR 52E
SH 29	—	—	—	—	c. 1938	1953	
SH 29	—	—	US 87 in Colorado Springs	SH 83 (now Academy Blvd) in Colorado Springs	c. 1964	2007	Decommissioned in October 2007 as part of a highway swap to get Powers Blvd. to become SH 21; signage was not removed until spring 2008. Now Circle Dr and Airport Rd.
SH 30	—	—	—	—	c. 1938	1953	
SH 30	—	—	—	—	c. 1953	c. 1954	Now CR R
SH 30	20.41	32.85	US 285 and I-25 in Denver	Quincy Avenue and Gun Club Road in Aurora	c. 1954	current	
SH 31	—	—	—	—	c. 1938	1953	
SH 31	—	—	—	—	c. 1963	c. 1969	Swapped out when SH 470 opened to traffic. Now County Line Road
SH 32	—	—	—	—	c. 1938	1953	
SH 32	—	—	—	—	1959	c. 1962	Eastern 5 miles was SH 146 until 1953; now CR G
SH 32	—	—	I-70 exit 286 in Aurora	I-70 Bus./US 40/US 287 in Aurora	1968	c. 2004	Now Tower Road
SH 33	—	—	—	—	c. 1938	1953	
SH 33	—	—	—	—	c. 1966	1968	Carrier route for I-225
SH 33	—	—	I-25 near downtown Denver	SH 2 in Denver	1968	2002	
SH 34	—	—	—	—	c. 1938	1953	
SH 35	—	—	—	—	c. 1938	1953	Now CR 19
SH 35	1.01	1.63	I-70 in Denver	Along Quebec Street in Denver	1972	current	
SH 36	—	—	—	—	c. 1938	1953	
SH 36	—	—	I-25 near downtown Denver	SH 2 in Denver	1960	1968	Renumbered SH 33 to avoid confusion with US 36 and new SH 36
SH 36	24.4	39.3	I-70 near Watkins	US 36/SH 40 in Byers	1968	current	
SH 37	—	—	US 34 in Kersey	SH 392 in Lucerne	1938	2007	Until 1953, continued south to US 6 northeast of Hudson; decommissioned in March 2007 as part of the north front range route swap
SH 38	—	—	—	—	c. 1938	1953	
SH 38	—	—	I-25 in Colorado Springs	I-25 Bus. (now US 87) in Colorado Springs	1963	2007	Decommissioned in October 2007 as part of a highway swap to number Powers Boulevard as SH 21; signage was not removed until spring 2008; now Fillmore Street
SH 39	7.57	12.18	I-76 in Wiggins	SH 144 near Jackson Lake State Park	1938	current	
SH 40	—	—	—	—	c. 1938	1953	
SH 40	—	—	—	—	1963	1968	Became part of the routing of US 164 in 1966; now US 160
SH 40	24.1	38.8	US 36/SH 36 in Byers	Main Street in Agate	1968	current	Former portion of US 40
SH 41	—	—	—	—	c. 1938	1953	
SH 41	9.50	15.29	US 160	SR 162 at the Utah state line	—	—	
SH 42	—	—	—	—	c. 1938	1953	
SH 42	4.87	7.84	Baseline Road/SH 7 in Lafayette	US 287 in Lafayette	c. 1961	current	Most of this route was part of SH 168 until 1953
SH 43	—	—	—	—	c. 1938	1953	
SH 44	—	—	—	—	c. 1938	1953	
SH 44	4.95	7.97	104th Avenue and Colorado Boulevard in Thornton	SH 2 in Commerce City	—	—	
SH 45	—	—	—	—	c. 1938	1953	
SH 45	8.73	14.05	I-25 south of Pueblo	US 50 northwest of Pueblo	1966	current	Cosigned with Pueblo Boulevard
SH 46	—	—	—	—	c. 1938	1953	
SH 46	6.61	10.64	SH 119 near Black Hawk	Jefferson County line (becomes CR 70)	1973	current	
SH 47	—	—	—	—	c. 1938	1953	
SH 47	4.63	7.45	I-25 in north Pueblo	US 50/SH 96 east of Pueblo	c. 1970	current	
SH 48	—	—	—	—	c. 1938	1953	
SH 49	—	—	—	—	c. 1938	1953	
SH 49	—	—	—	—	c. 1967	1968	Carrier route overlapping US 36
SH 50	—	—	—	—	c. 1923	1968	Renumbered as an extension of SH 105 to avoid confusion with US 50
SH 51	—	—	US 50 in Granada	US 138 in Julesburg	c. 1923	1968	Entirely overlapped US 385; until 1953 it continued north to Nebraska via current SH 11 and southeast via Two Buttes, Walsh, Stonington, and Midway to Kansas.
SH 51	—	—	SH 7 in Brighton	I-76 exit 17 near Brighton	1968	1998	Became part of SH 2; this section of SH 2 was given to the city of Brighton in 2010
SH 52	111	179	SH 119 near Niwot	SH 14 at Raymer	c. 1923	current	
SH 53	—	—	—	—	c. 1923	1953	
SH 53	1.66	2.67	E. 58th Avenue in Denver	SH 224 north of Denver in Adams County	1971	current	
SH 54	—	—	—	—	c. 1923	1968	Carrier route overlapping US 34
SH 55	—	—	—	—	c. 1923	1953	Original route for US 160, but was trimmed back to SH 206 in 1950 after US 160 was rerouted along SH 100; turned back a year later
SH 55	5.65	9.09	Logan CR 81	US 138 in Crook	1968	current	
SH 56	6.7	10.8	US 287 west of Berthoud	I-25 east of Berthoud	c. 1923	current	Section from US 287 to CR 23 was decommissioned in March 2007 as part of the north front range route swap; continued northwest to US 34 until 1950, and to halfway between US 34 and US 287 until 1953
SH 57	0.53	0.85	I-70	US 24 in Stratton	c. 1923	current	Until 1953, continued north to US 36 in Kirk; truncated to 9 miles north of US 24 in 1953, and to current route in 1992
SH 58	5.43	8.74	US 6/SH 93 in Golden	I-70 in Wheat Ridge	c. 1923	current	Until 1953, continued west via Golden Gate Canyon Road and SH 46 to SH 119
SH 59	173.30	278.90	US 40/US 287 at Kit Carson	US 138 in Sedgwick	c. 1923	current	Until 1953, continued north to Nebraska and south to Oklahoma
SH 60	19.99	32.17	US 287 in Campion	US 85 southwest of Gilcrest	c. 1923	current	
SH 61	40.99	65.97	US 34 in Otis	US 6 near Sterling	c. 1923	current	
SH 62	23.40	37.66	SH 145 near Placerville	US 550 near Ridgeway	c. 1923	current	
SH 63	56.41	90.78	US 36 in Anton	US 6 in Atwood	c. 1923	current	The 1953 decommissioned segment is still signed as "Hwy 63" between Arriba and Anton.
SH 64	73.70	118.61	US 40 in Dinosaur	SH 13 near Meeker	c. 1923	current	
SH 65	61.38	98.78	SH 92 near Delta	I-70 near Palisade	c. 1923	current	
SH 66	22.69	36.52	US 36 near Lyons	US 85 in Platteville	c. 1923	current	Section from US 36 to Estes Park decommissioned in March 2007 as part of the north front range route swap
SH 67	71.72	115.42	SH 96 in Wetmore	US 85 in Sedalia	c. 1923	current	
SH 68	—	—	—	—	c. 1923	1953	
SH 68	4.46	7.18	US 287 in Fort Collins	I-25 in Fort Collins	c. 1968	2005	Now Harmony Rd (City of Fort Collins)
SH 69	82.87	133.37	I-25 Bus. near Walsenburg	US 50 at Texas Creek	c. 1923	current	
SH 70	—	—	Kipling Street in Morrison	SH 7 in Brighton	c. 1923	1968	Section from US 40/US 287 to Morrison became part of rerouted US 285 and the rest was renumbered SH 51
SH 71	224.65	361.54	US 350 near La Junta	N-71 at the Nebraska state line	c. 1923	current	
SH 72	51.55	82.96	I-70 in Wheat Ridge	SH 7 near Allenspark	c. 1923	current	
SH 73	—	—	US 285 in Conifer	SH 74 at Evergreen	c. 1923	1965	Signs still show SH 73
SH 74	18.01	28.98	I-70 at El Rancho exit	SH 8 in Morrison	c. 1923	current	
SH 75	3.71	5.97	SH 470 near Littleton	Bowles Avenue at Lowry Street in Littleton	c. 1923	current	Previously Unsigned due to theft, however, CDOT replaced the sign between November 2014 and May 2015
SH 76	—	—	SH 165 southwest of Beulah	SH 45 in southwest Pueblo	c. 1923	1976	Renamed SH 78 in 1975 to avoid duplication when I-80S was renamed I-76
SH 77	—	—	—	—	c. 1923	1954	Now CR 77
SH 78	—	—	—	—	c. 1923	1968	Swapped with SH 293 in 1940; carrier route for US 6
SH 78	33.27	53.54	SH 165 southwest of Beulah	SH 45 in southwest Pueblo	1976	current	The first nine miles from SH 165 are still unpaved.
SH 79	23.89	38.45	I-70 near Bennett	SH 52 at Prospect Valley	c. 1923	current	
SH 80	—	—	—	—	c. 1923	1968	Renumbered as an extension of SH 141 to avoid confusion with I-80S
SH 81	—	—	—	—	c. 1923	1938	Became part of rerouted SH 2 (old SH 2 became SH 3 and SH 16)
SH 81	—	—	—	—	c. 1938	1953	
SH 82	85.29	137.26	I-70 in Glenwood Springs	US 24 near Granite	c. 1923	current	Traverses Independence Pass, is closed during the Winter, and is the highest through road in the state highway system.
SH 83	77.26	124.34	SH 21 in north Colorado Springs	SH 2 at Leetsdale Drive/Colorado Boulevard in Denver	c. 1923	current	Section south of Powers Boulevard and spur SH 83 decommissioned as part of a highway swap to designate Powers Boulevard as SH 21 in October 2007; signage did not change until spring 2008; this section is now Interquest Parkway, Voyager Parkway, and Academy Boulevard; Spur SH 83 is now Academy Boulevard
SH 84	—	—	—	—	c. 1923	1968	Renumbered to SH 134 to avoid confusion with US 84
SH 85	—	—	—	—	c. 1923	1936	Renumbered SH 189 because it intersected US 85
SH 85	—	—	—	—	c. 1938	1953	
SH 86	61.47	98.93	I-25 in Castle Rock	I-70 near Limon	c. 1923	current	
SH 87	—	—	—	—	c. 1923	1968	Became part of relocated SH 75
SH 88	18.76	30.19	Colfax Avenue and Federal Boulevard in Denver	SH 83 in Aurora	c. 1923	current	
SH 89	34.34	55.26	SH 116 at Buckeye Crossroads	US 50/US 400 in Holly	c. 1923	current	
SH 90	41.9	67.4	Utah State Route 46 at the Utah state line	SH 141 at Vancorum	c. 1923	current	
SH 91	22.57	36.32	US 24 near Leadville	I-70 at Copper Mountain	c. 1923	current	
SH 92	73.29	117.95	Crawford Avenue and Main Street in Delta	US 50 near Sapinero	c. 1923	current	
SH 93	19.89	32.01	US 6 in Golden	SH 119 in Boulder	c. 1923	current	
SH 94	86.09	138.55	US 24 just east of Colorado Springs	US 40/US 287	c. 1923	current	
SH 95	14.32	23.05	US 285 and Sheridan Boulevard in Denver	US 36 in Westminster	c. 1923	current	
SH 96	207.45	333.86	SH 69 in Westcliffe	K-96 at the Kansas state line	c. 1923	current	
SH 97	4.58	7.37	SH 141 near Naturita	Main Street and 3rd Avenue in Nucla	c. 1923	current	
SH 98	—	—	—	—	c. 1923	1953	Became a portion of SH 74
SH 99	—	—	—	—	c. 1923	1954	Section south of SH 142 deleted 1953; remainder became part of rerouted SH 142
SH 100	—	—	Trinidad	Kansas border	c. 1923	1968	Carrier route for US 160
SH 100	0.41	0.66	US 160 north of Vilas	A & Main streets in Vilas	1968	current	Formerly SH 100 Spur (created in 1965) and was part of SH 197 until 1953
SH 101	21.41	34.46	CR K/CR 14	US 50 in Las Animas	c. 1923	current	
SH 102	—	—	—	—	c. 1923	1968	Carrier route for US 36
SH 103	22.48	36.18	I-70 at Idaho Springs	CR 151 and CR 103 at Mestaa'ėhehe Pass	c. 1923	current	
SH 104	57.1	91.9	SH 82 at Basalt	US 24 at Leadville	c. 1923	1953	Decommissioned following a 1943 tunnel collapse
SH 105	32.63	52.51	I-25 near Monument	SH 67 near Sedalia	c. 1923	current	Section from I-25 to SH 83 decommissioned as part of a highway swap to designate Powers Boulevard as SH 21 in October 2007; signage did not change until spring 2008
SH 106	—	—	—	—	c. 1923	1968	Carrier route overlapping US 491
SH 107	—	—	—	—	c. 1923	1925	Became part of relocated SH 2 (the old route became SH 144)
SH 107	—	—	—	—	c. 1931	1953	
SH 108	—	—	—	—	c. 1923	1953	Renumbered as SH 145 Spur
SH 109	65.33	105.14	US 160 near Kim	Cheraw	c. 1923	current	Until 1953, continued north to Genoa
SH 110	0.19	0.31	US 550 in Silverton	Silverton	c. 1923	current	Signed as CR 110; still a state highway, but is no longer a real part of the state highway system as of November 24, 2006
SH 111	—	—	—	—	c. 1923	c. 1968	Renumbered as an extension of SH 12; continued south to the New Mexico border until 1953
SH 112	27.80	44.74	US 160 at Del Norte	SH 17 at Hooper	c. 1923	current	
SH 113	18.83	30.30	US 138 northeast of Sterling	N-19 at Nebraska state line	c. 1923	current	
SH 114	61.74	99.36	US 50 near Gunnison	US 285 in Saguache	c. 1923	current	
SH 115	45.99	74.01	US 50 in Cañon City	I-25 in Colorado Springs	c. 1923	current	
SH 116	32.32	52.01	US 287/US 385 near Springfield	Kansas state line	c. 1923	current	
SH 117	—	—	—	—	c. 1923	1953	
SH 118	—	—	SH 51 east of Two Buttes	Kansas state line	c. 1923	1953	Became part of SH 116, which also replaced part of SH 51 when it was truncated
SH 119	63.70	102.52	US 6 west of Golden in Clear Creek Canyon	I-25 near Longmont	c. 1923	current	
SH 120	7.19	11.57	SH 115 east of Florence	US 50 east of Penrose	c. 1923	current	
SH 121	30.43	48.97	Waterton Road	US 36/US 287/SH 128 in Broomfield	c. 1923	current	
SH 122	—	—	Lake Circle in Broadmoor	US 85/US 87/SH 115 in Colorado Springs	c. 1923	1997	Was still signed in July 1998
SH 123	30	48	SH 14 at Ted's Place	Wyoming state line	c. 1923	1968	Carrier route overlapping US 285 (later US 287)
SH 124	—	—	—	—	c. 1923	1953	
SH 125	75.41	121.36	US 40 near Granby	WYO 230 at the Wyoming state line	c. 1923	current	
SH 126	—	—	—	—	c. 1923	1953	Spur to South Platte became SH 75 in 1939
SH 127	9.20	14.81	SH 125 near Cowdrey	WYO 230 at the Wyoming state line	c. 1923	current	
SH 128	—	—	US 40S near Hartsel	SH 77 near Lake George	c. 1924	c. 1929	Now part of rerouted US 24
SH 128	10	16	SH 93 south of Boulder	I-25 in Westminster	c. 1936	current	
SH 129	—	—	WYO 70	US 40	c. 1923	1953	Now CR 129
SH 130	—	—	—	—	c. 1924	1953	
SH 131	68.72	110.59	I-70/US 6 at Wolcott	US 40 south of Steamboat Springs	c. 1923	current	
SH 132	—	—	—	—	c. 1924	1975	
SH 133	71.40	114.91	SH 92 in Hotchkiss	SH 82 in Carbondale	c. 1923	current	
SH 134	—	—	—	—	c. 1924	1953	
SH 134	27.0	43.5	SH 131 in Toponas	US 40 north of Kremmling	1968	current	
SH 135	27.48	44.22	US 50 in Gunnison	Elk Avenue and 6th Street in Crested Butte	c. 1923	current	
SH 136	4.47	7.19	US 285 in La Jara	2nd Street South in Sanford	c. 1924	current	
SH 137	—	—	—	—	c. 1923	1953	
SH 138	—	—	—	—	c. 1924	1953	
SH 139	72.07	115.99	I-70 in Loma	SH 64 in Rangely	c. 1923	current	decommissioned in 1953, but restored in 1963
SH 140	23.4	37.7	NM 170 at the New Mexico state line	US 160 near Durango	c. 1925	current	
SH 141	159.7	257.0	US 491 near Dove Creek	South of I-70 in Grand Junction	c. 1923	current	
SH 142	33.8	54.4	US 285 near Romeo	SH 159 in San Luis	c. 1925	current	Until 1954, followed CR-P from SH 99 (now CR-11) to SH 159; rerouted on current route due to restoration of SH 248
SH 143	—	—	—	—	c. 1923	1953	
SH 144	28.7	46.2	I-76 west of Wiggins	SH 52 in Fort Morgan	c. 1925	current	
SH 145	116.1	186.8	US 160 in Cortez	SH 141 near Naturita	c. 1923	current	
SH 146	—	—	—	—	c. 1926	c. 1937	
SH 146	—	—	—	—	c. 1938	c. 1953	Later restored as part of a longer SH 32
SH 146	—	—	—	—	1970	1986	Became part of SH 141; portions were formerly SH 403
SH 147	—	—	—	—	c. 1923	1978	Became a portion of SH 184
SH 148	—	—	—	—	c. 1926	1953	decommissioned in 1928 but restored in 1929
SH 149	117.5	189.1	US 160 in South Fork	US 50 west of Gunnison	c. 1923	current	
SH 150	16.1	25.9	US 160 west of Blanca	Great Sand Dunes National Park	c. 1928	current	decommissioned in 1953 but restored in 1960
SH 151	33.9	54.6	SH 172 in Ignacio	US 160 east of Chimney Rock	c. 1923	current	
SH 152	—	—	—	—	c. 1928	c. 1982	
SH 153	—	—	—	—	c. 1923	1968	Renumbered as an extension of SH 2
SH 154	—	—	—	—	c. 1926	1953	Section west of SH 61 became an extension of SH 59 and remainder removed
SH 155	31	50	SH 14 near Buckingham	Wyoming state line near Hereford	c. 1923	1953	
SH 156	—	—	—	—	c. 1928	c. 1938	
SH 156	—	—	—	—	c. 1938	1953	
SH 157	—	—	US 24 near Falcon	SH 86 in Kiowa	c. 1923	1954	Followed Elbert Road then Kiowa–Bennett road until 1953; remainder decommissioned in 1954 in exchange for restoring SH 217
SH 157	3.7	6.0	US 36 in Boulder	SH 119 in Boulder	c. 1974	current	
SH 158	—	—	—	—	c. 1929	1953	
SH 159	33.6	54.1	NM 522 at the New Mexico state line	US 160 near Fort Garland	c. 1923	current	
SH 160	—	—	—	—	c. 1929	1968	Renumbered as an extension of SH 72 to avoid confusion with US 160
SH 161	—	—	—	—	c. 1923	c. 1935	
SH 161	—	—	—	—	c. 1935	1953	
SH 162	—	—	US 50 near Parlin	Nathrop	c. 1929	1984	The two ends never met. Western portion turned back in 1953; Eastern portion turned back in 1984. Now CR 162
SH 163	—	—	—	—	c. 1923	1968	Carrier route overlapping US 285
SH 164	—	—	—	—	c. 1929	c. 1934	
SH 164	—	—	—	—	c. 1935	1953	
SH 165	37.1	59.7	SH 96 east of Silver Cliff	I-25 near Colorado City	c. 1923	current	
SH 166	—	—	—	—	c. 1933	1953	Became US 385 around 1959
SH 167	4.86	7.82	CR JJ south of Fowler	SH 96 near Fowler	c. 1923	current	
SH 168	—	—	US 287/SH 1 in Louisville	SH 7 in Lafayette	c. 1933	c. 1953	Now mostly SH 42; may have been partially restored in 1961, but become part of SH 42 in 1965
SH 169	—	—	—	—	c. 1923	c. 1970	
SH 170	—	—	—	—	c. 1933	c. 1938	
SH 170	6.97	11.22	Eldorado Canyon State Park	US 36 in Superior	c. 1938	current	Segment from Eldorado Canyon State Park to Eldorado Springs is still unpaved.
SH 171	—	—	—	—	c. 1926	c. 1938	
SH 171	—	—	—	—	c. 1938	1953	
SH 172	24.5	39.4	NM 511 at the New Mexico state line	US 160 southeast of Durango	c. 1933	current	
SH 173	—	—	—	—	c. 1926	c. 1938	
SH 173	—	—	—	—	c. 1938	1953	
SH 174	—	—	—	—	c. 1935	c. 1938	
SH 174	—	—	—	—	c. 1938	1953	
SH 175	—	—	—	—	c. 1926	c. 1938	
SH 175	—	—	—	—	c. 1938	1953	
SH 176	—	—	US 385 in Holyoke	N-23 at the Nebraska state line	c. 1935	1989	Decommissioned in 1952; restored in 1968; changed to SH 23 to avoid confusion with nearby I-76 and to match Nebraska
SH 177	6.11	9.83	SH 470 at Highlands Ranch	US 285 in Cherry Hills Village	c. 1928	current	
SH 178	—	—	—	—	c. 1935	c. 1940	
SH 178	—	—	—	—	c. 1940	1953	
SH 179	—	—	—	—	c. 1929	1953	
SH 180	—	—	—	—	c. 1935	1968	
SH 181	—	—	—	—	c. 1929	1953	
SH 182	—	—	—	—	c. 1939	1968	Carrier route overlapping US 6
SH 183	1.00	1.61	Fort Lyon	US 50 near Las Animas	c. 1933	current	
SH 184	25.5	41.0	US 491 near Lewis	US 160 Bus. in Mancos	c. 1938	current	
SH 185	—	—	US 85 at Castle Rock	Wyoming state line	c. 1933	1968	Carrier route overlapping US 87; now I-25
SH 186	15	24	US 34 near Loveland	US 287 near Fort Collins	c. 1933	1953	This route went through Masonville.
SH 187	0.69	1.11	SH 133 near Paonia	Paonia	c. 1934	2010	Now Grand Avenue
SH 188	—	—	—	—	c. 1938	1953	
SH 189	—	—	—	—	c. 1935	1953	
SH 190	—	—	—	—	c. 1938	1953	
SH 191	—	—	—	—	c. 1938	1953	
SH 192	—	—	—	—	c. 1938	c. 1968	
SH 193	—	—	—	—	c. 1938	1953	
SH 194	20.33	32.72	SH 109 near La Junta	US 50 near Las Animas	c. 1938	current	
SH 195	—	—	—	—	c. 1938	1953	
SH 196	8.92	14.36	US 50 near McClave	US 287 near Wiley	c. 1938	current	
SH 197	10.00	16.09	US 160/SH 100 north of Vilas	CR T south of Vilas	c. 1938	c. 1953	Northern portion later restored as SH 100 Spur, and is now SH 100
SH 198	—	—	—	—	c. 1938	1953	
SH 199	—	—	—	—	c. 1938	1953	
SH 200	—	—	—	—	c. 1938	c. 1951	
SH 200	2.72	4.38	West of North Fork Cache La Poudre River at Livermore	US 287 near Livermore	c. 1951	c. 1968	Now part of CR 74E
SH 201	—	—	—	—	c. 1938	1953	
SH 202	3.23	5.20	Otero CR 16/CR FF	US 50 in Rocky Ford	c. 1938	current	
SH 203	—	—	—	—	c. 1938	1953	
SH 204	—	—	—	—	c. 1938	1953	
SH 205	—	—	—	—	c. 1938	1953	
SH 206	—	—	—	—	c. 1938	1953	
SH 207	5.94	9.56	US 50 in Manzanola	SH 96 in Crowley	c. 1938	current	
SH 208	—	—	—	—	c. 1938	1953	
SH 209	1.53	2.46	US 50	SH 96 in Boone	c. 1938	current	
SH 210	—	—	—	—	c. 1938	1953	
SH 211	—	—	—	—	c. 1938	1953	
SH 212	—	—	—	—	c. 1938	1953	
SH 213	—	—	—	—	c. 1938	1953	
SH 214	—	—	—	—	c. 1938	1953	
SH 215	—	—	—	—	c. 1938	1953	
SH 216	—	—	—	—	c. 1938	1953	
SH 217	—	—	—	—	c. 1938	c. 1964	decommissioned in 1953, but partially restored in 1954
SH 218	—	—	—	—	c. 1938	c. 1951	
SH 218	—	—	—	—	c. 1951	1953	
SH 219	—	—	—	—	c. 1938	1953	
SH 220	—	—	—	—	c. 1938	1953	
SH 221	—	—	—	—	c. 1938	1953	
SH 222	—	—	—	—	c. 1938	1953	
SH 223	—	—	—	—	c. 1938	1953	
SH 224	3.63	5.84	US 36	US 6/US 85	c. 1938	current	
SH 225	—	—	—	—	c. 1938	1953	
SH 226	—	—	—	—	c. 1938	1953	
SH 227	1.85	2.98	US 50 Bus.	SH 96 in Pueblo	—	—	sections south of US 50 Bus. and north of SH 96 eliminated 1953
SH 228	—	—	—	—	c. 1938	c. 1954	section west of SH 227 removed 1953; rerouted south replacing part of SH 227
SH 229	—	—	—	—	c. 1938	1953	
SH 230	—	—	—	—	c. 1938	c. 1939	
SH 230	—	—	—	—	c. 1940	1953	
SH 231	2.05	3.30	US 50 Bus.	US 50/SH 96 near Pueblo	c. 1938	current	
SH 232	—	—	—	—	c. 1938	1953	
SH 233	—	—	US 50 Bus.	US 50/SH 96 near Pueblo	c. 1938	2017	
SH 234	—	—	—	—	c. 1938	1953	
SH 235	—	—	—	—	c. 1938	1953	
SH 236	—	—	—	—	c. 1938	1953	
SH 237	—	—	—	—	c. 1938	1953	
SH 238	—	—	—	—	c. 1938	1953	
SH 239	3.35	5.39	US 160 in Trinidad	CR 32/CR 75	—	—	section northeast of El Moro removed 1955
SH 240	—	—	—	—	c. 1938	c. 1954	
SH 241	—	—	—	—	c. 1938	1953	
SH 242	—	—	—	—	c. 1938	1982	
SH 243	—	—	—	—	c. 1938	c. 1951	
SH 244	—	—	—	—	c. 1938	1953	
SH 245	—	—	—	—	c. 1938	c. 1961	
SH 246	—	—	—	—	c. 1938	1953	
SH 247	—	—	—	—	c. 1938	1953	
SH 248	—	—	—	—	c. 1938	1982	decommissioned in 1953, but restored in 1954
SH 249	—	—	—	—	c. 1938	1953	
SH 250	19	31	Pikes Peak	US 24 in Cascade	c. 1938	1948	Pikes Peak Highway, now maintained by City of Colorado Springs.
SH 251	—	—	—	—	c. 1938	1953	
SH 252	—	—	—	—	c. 1938	1953	
SH 253	6.04	9.72	SH 1 near Fort Collins	CR 70 near Waverly	c. 1938	1953	Now part of CR 15
SH 254	—	—	—	—	c. 1938	1953	Renumbered as an extension of SH 119
SH 255	—	—	—	—	c. 1938	1953	
SH 256	—	—	SH 60 in Milliken	US 85 in Peckham	c. 1938	2007	Decommissioned in March 2007 as part of the north front range route swap
SH 257	18.48	29.74	SH 60 in Milliken	SH 14 east of Fort Collins	c. 1938	current	
SH 258	6.04	9.72	US 287 in Laporte	US 287 in Fort Collins	c. 1938	1953	This route used Mountain Ave, Laporte Ave, and Overland Trail
SH 259	—	—	—	—	c. 1938	1953	
SH 260	1.85	2.98	SH 14 in Fort Collins	US 87 near Fort Collins	c. 1938	1953	This route used Summit View Dr and Prospect Rd
SH 261	—	—	SH 186 in Masonville	Northwest of Masonville	c. 1938	c. 1951	Now part of CR 27
SH 262	—	—	US 34 in Rocky Mountain National Park	US 34 near Drake	c. 1938	c. 1965	Renumbered as an extension of SH 66
SH 263	2.73	4.39	US 85 in Greeley	Greeley	c. 1938	2021	Entire route decommissioned by 2021. Now E 8th St.
SH 264	—	—	—	—	c. 1938	1953	
SH 265	—	—	—	—	c. 1938	c. 1941	
SH 265	3.62	5.83	I-70 at Denver	US 6/US 85 at Commerce City	c. 1941	current	
SH 266	—	—	—	—	c. 1938	c. 1939	
SH 266	—	—	—	—	c. 1949	c. 1951	
SH 266	11.52	18.54	US 50/SH 17 at Rocky Ford	SH 109 near Cheraw	c. 1951	current	
SH 267	—	—	—	—	c. 1938	1953	
SH 268	—	—	—	—	c. 1938	1953	
SH 269	—	—	—	—	c. 1938	1953	
SH 270	—	—	—	—	c. 1938	1953	
SH 271	—	—	—	—	c. 1938	c. 1939	
SH 271	—	—	—	—	c. 1939	c. 1941	
SH 271	—	—	—	—	c. 1942	1953	
SH 272	—	—	—	—	c. 1938	1953	
SH 273	—	—	—	—	c. 1938	1953	
SH 274	—	—	—	—	c. 1938	1953	
SH 275	—	—	—	—	c. 1938	1953	
SH 276	—	—	—	—	c. 1938	1953	
SH 277	—	—	—	—	c. 1938	1953	
SH 278	—	—	—	—	c. 1938	1986	
SH 279	—	—	SH 119 in Black Hawk	Central City	c. 1938	1999	Originally routed from Mestaa'ėhehe Pass through Idaho Springs to Apex, northwest of Central City
SH 280	—	—	—	—	c. 1938	1953	
SH 281	—	—	—	—	c. 1938	1953	
SH 282	—	—	—	—	c. 1938	1953	
SH 283	—	—	—	—	c. 1938	1953	
SH 284	—	—	—	—	c. 1938	1953	
SH 285	—	—	—	—	c. 1938	1953	
SH 286	—	—	—	—	c. 1938	1953	
SH 287	—	—	—	—	c. 1938	1953	
SH 288	—	—	—	—	c. 1938	1953	
SH 289	—	—	—	—	c. 1938	1953	
SH 290	—	—	—	—	c. 1938	1953	
SH 291	9.14	14.71	US 50 at Salida	US 285	c. 1938	current	
SH 292	—	—	—	—	c. 1938	1953	
SH 293	—	—	—	—	c. 1938	1953	swapped with SH 78/US 6 when Vail Pass was completed
SH 294	—	—	—	—	c. 1938	1953	
SH 295	—	—	—	—	c. 1938	1953	
SH 296	—	—	—	—	c. 1938	1953	
SH 297	—	—	—	—	c. 1938	1953	
SH 298	—	—	—	—	c. 1938	1953	
SH 299	—	—	—	—	c. 1938	1953	
SH 300	3.36	5.41	US 24 near Leadville	Leadville National Fish Hatchery	c. 1938	current	
SH 301	—	—	—	—	c. 1938	1953	
SH 302	—	—	—	—	c. 1938	1953	
SH 303	—	—	—	—	c. 1938	1953	
SH 304	—	—	—	—	c. 1938	1953	
SH 305	—	—	—	—	c. 1938	1953	
SH 306	—	—	SH 135 in Almont	US 24 in Buena Vista	c. 1938	1984	The two ends never met. Western portion turned back in 1953; Eastern portion turned back in 1984. Western portion now CR 742, Eastern portion now CR 306.
SH 307	—	—	—	—	c. 1938	1953	
SH 308	—	—	—	—	c. 1938	1953	
SH 309	—	—	—	—	c. 1938	1953	
SH 310	—	—	—	—	c. 1938	1953	
SH 311	—	—	—	—	c. 1938	1953	
SH 312	—	—	—	—	c. 1938	1953	
SH 313	—	—	—	—	c. 1938	1953	
SH 314	—	—	—	—	c. 1938	1953	
SH 315	—	—	—	—	c. 1938	1953	
SH 316	—	—	—	—	c. 1938	1953	
SH 317	12.24	19.70	SH 13 in Hamilton	CR 29	c. 1938	current	
SH 318	60.46	97.30	Utah state line	US 40 west of Maybell	c. 1938	current	
SH 319	—	—	—	—	c. 1938	c. 1939	
SH 319	—	—	—	—	c. 1939	c. 1941	
SH 319	—	—	—	—	c. 1941	1953	
SH 320	—	—	—	—	c. 1938	1953	
SH 321	—	—	—	—	c. 1938	1953	
SH 322	—	—	—	—	c. 1938	1953	
SH 323	—	—	—	—	c. 1938	1953	
SH 324	—	—	—	—	c. 1938	1953	
SH 325	11.39	18.33	SH 13 north of Rifle	CR 217 in Rifle Mountain Park	c. 1938	current	
SH 326	—	—	—	—	c. 1938	1953	
SH 327	—	—	Crested Butte	SH 133 near Redstone	c. 1938	1953	The two ends never met
SH 328	—	—	US 50 near Doyleville	US 50 near Sargents	c. 1938	1953	This route went through Waunita Hot Springs
SH 329	—	—	—	—	c. 1938	1953	
SH 330	11.39	18.33	SH 65	Grove Creek Road in Collbran	c. 1938	current	
SH 331	—	—	—	—	c. 1938	1953	
SH 332	—	—	—	—	c. 1938	1953	
SH 333	—	—	—	—	c. 1938	1953	
SH 334	—	—	—	—	c. 1938	1953	
SH 335	—	—	—	—	c. 1938	1953	
SH 336	—	—	—	—	c. 1938	c. 1941	
SH 336	—	—	—	—	c. 1942	c. 1954	
SH 337	—	—	—	—	c. 1938	1953	
SH 338	—	—	—	—	c. 1938	1953	
SH 339	—	—	—	—	c. 1938	1953	
SH 340	13.36	21.50	US 6 in Fruita	I-70 Bus. in Grand Junction	c. 1938	current	
SH 341	—	—	Hartman Rocks Parking Area	Baldwin	c. 1938	1953	North of SH 135 is now CR 730
SH 342	—	—	—	—	c. 1938	c. 1948	
SH 342	—	—	—	—	c. 1949	1953	
SH 343	—	—	—	—	c. 1938	1953	
SH 344	—	—	—	—	c. 1938	1953	
SH 345	—	—	—	—	c. 1938	1953	
SH 346	—	—	—	—	c. 1938	1953	
SH 347	5.17	8.32	US 50 near Montrose	Inside Black Canyon of the Gunnison National Park	c. 1938	current	
SH 348	17.05	27.44	US 50 in Delta	US 50 in Olathe	c. 1938	current	
SH 349	—	—	—	—	c. 1938	1953	
SH 350	—	—	—	—	c. 1938	1953	
SH 351	—	—	—	—	c. 1938	1953	
SH 352	—	—	—	—	c. 1938	1953	
SH 353	—	—	—	—	c. 1938	1953	Later became part of SH 110
SH 354	—	—	—	—	c. 1938	1953	
SH 355	—	—	—	—	c. 1938	c. 1951	
SH 355	—	—	—	—	c. 1951	c. 1967	
SH 356	—	—	—	—	c. 1938	1953	
SH 357	—	—	—	—	c. 1938	1953	
SH 358	—	—	—	—	c. 1938	1953	
SH 359	—	—	—	—	c. 1938	1953	
SH 360	—	—	—	—	c. 1938	1953	
SH 361	—	—	—	—	c. 1938	1984	Now FR 853
SH 362	—	—	—	—	c. 1938	1953	
SH 363	—	—	—	—	c. 1938	1953	
SH 364	—	—	—	—	c. 1938	1953	
SH 365	—	—	—	—	c. 1938	1953	
SH 366	—	—	—	—	c. 1938	1953	
SH 367	—	—	—	—	c. 1938	1953	
SH 368	12.33	19.84	SH 370	US 285 near Alamosa	c. 1938	current	
SH 369	—	—	—	—	c. 1938	1953	
SH 370	14.15	22.77	SH 15	US 285 near Alamosa	c. 1938	current	
SH 371	6.07	9.77	SH 15 near La Jara	SH 368	c. 1938	current	
SH 372	—	—	—	—	c. 1938	1953	
SH 373	—	—	—	—	c. 1938	1953	
SH 374	—	—	—	—	c. 1938	1990	
SH 375	—	—	—	—	c. 1938	1953	
SH 376	—	—	—	—	c. 1938	1953	
SH 377	—	—	—	—	c. 1938	1953	
SH 378	—	—	—	—	c. 1938	1953	
SH 379	—	—	—	—	c. 1938	1953	
SH 380	—	—	—	—	c. 1938	1953	
SH 381	—	—	—	—	c. 1946	1953	
SH 382	—	—	—	—	c. 1938	c. 1967	Renumbered to SH 49/US 36 when the Denver-Boulder Turnpike became free
SH 383	—	—	—	—	c. 1946	1953	
SH 384	—	—	—	—	c. 1938	1953	
SH 385	—	—	—	—	c. 1947	1953	
SH 386	—	—	—	—	c. 1947	1953	
SH 387	—	—	—	—	c. 1947	c. 1948	renumbered SH 388
SH 387	—	—	—	—	c. 1948	1953	
SH 388	—	—	—	—	c. 1948	1953	
SH 389	12.65	20.36	New Mexico state line, near Branson	US 160	c. 1949	current	
SH 390	—	—	—	—	c. 1949	1953	
SH 391	9.51	15.30	US 285 in Lakewood	I-70 in Wheat Ridge	c. 1951	current	
SH 392	45.33	72.95	US 287 near Fort Collins	SH 14 near Briggsdale	c. 1949	current	Extended east from CR 55 to SH 14 and west from I-25 to SH 287 in March 2007 as part of the north front range route swap
SH 393	—	—	—	—	c. 1950	1953	
SH 394	9.25	14.89	Victory Way in Craig/US 40	Moffat County–Routt County line	c. 1949	current	
SH 395	—	—	—	—	c. 1950	1953	
SH 396	—	—	—	—	c. 1950	1953	
SH 397	—	—	—	—	c. 1950	1953	
SH 398	—	—	Eldorado Springs	SH 93	c. 1950	1977	Renumbered as an extension of SH 170
SH 399	—	—	—	—	c. 1951	1953	
SH 400	3.96	6.37	US 287 in Fort Collins	US 87 near Fort Collins	c. 1951	c. 1958	Now East Vine Dr
SH 401	—	—	—	—	c. 1951	1953	
SH 402	4.23	6.81	US 287 in Loveland	I-25	c. 1951	current	
SH 403	—	—	—	—	c. 1951	1953	Later restored as part of a longer SH 146
SH 404	—	—	—	—	c. 1951	1953	
SH 470	27.29	43.92	US 6 in Golden	I-25/E-470 in Lone Tree	c. 1970	current	Was originally planned as Interstate 470
SH 789	396	637	US 666 at the New Mexico state line	WYO 789 near Baggs	c. 1954	c. 1984	Was to be part of a proposed US 789 through Colorado, now part of US 491, US 160, US 550, US 50, I-70 and SH 13
Former

== Special routes ==
Number	Length (mi)	Length (km)	Southern or western terminus	Northern or eastern terminus	Formed	Removed	Notes
SH 7 Bus.	1.592	2.562	SH 7 in Allenspark	SH 7 east of Allenspark	1972	current	Follows the old alignment of SH 7
SH 78 Bus.	1.493	2.403	CR 225 (Central Avenue) in Beulah	SH 78 in Beulah Valley	—	—	
SH 82 Bus.	2.41	3.88	SH 82 west of Basalt	SH 82 southeast of Basalt	1988	c. 2007	Turned back to local control between 2005 and 2007
SH 83 Spur	0.5	0.80	SH 83 at N. Academy/Voyager Pkwy. in Colorado Springs	I-25/US 85 in Colorado Springs	—	2007	Northern end of N. Academy Boulevard to I-25. Decommissioned in a October 2007 swap for Powers Boulevard.
SH 109 Spur	0.2	0.32	US 50 in La Junta	SH 109 in La Junta	1939	current	Runs down on Bradish Avenue from US 50 and then on 3rd Street to SH 109 (Adams Avenue)
SH 119 Spur	0.2	0.32	US 6	SH 119	1998	1998	Temporary designation for the current SH 119 at the US 6 intersection during a reconstruction project. SH 119 was planned to be shifted to what is now an abandoned tunnel
SH 145 Spur	3.5	5.6	Colorado State Highway 145 near Telluride, Colorado	Willow St in Telluride	—	—	A spur route that connects to Telluride
SH 257 Spur	1.1	1.8	Barricade near SH 257 south of Windsor	US 34 Bus. near Greeley	1940	current	Disconnected spur route of SH 257. Only indicated at the intersection with US 34 Bus
Former
