= U.S. Route 160 in Colorado =

Section of U.S. Highway in Colorado, United States

U.S. Highway 160
- Map of Colorado with US 160 highlighted in red

Route information
- Maintained by CDOT
- Length: 490.0 mi (788.6 km)
- Existed: 1926–present

Major junctions
- West end: US 160 at the New Mexico state line in Four Corners
- US 491 in Cortez; US 550 in Durango; US 84 in Pagosa Springs; US 285 in Monte Vista; US 285 in Alamosa; I-25 / US 85 / US 87 from Walsenburg to Trinidad; US 350 near Trinidad; US 287 / US 385 in Springfield
- East end: US-160 at the Kansas state line near Manter, KS

Location
- Country: United States
- State: Colorado
- Counties: Montezuma, La Plata, Archuleta, Mineral, Rio Grande, Alamosa, Costilla, Huerfano, Las Animas, Baca

Highway system
- United States Numbered Highway System; List; Special; Divided; Colorado State Highway System; Interstate; US; State; Scenic
← SH 159	→ SH 165

U.S. Route 160 (US 160) is a part of the U.S. Highway System that travels from Tuba City, Arizona, to Poplar Bluff, Missouri. In the state of Colorado, US 160 starts at the New Mexico state line southwest of Cortez and ends at the Kansas state line east of Springfield.

== Route description ==
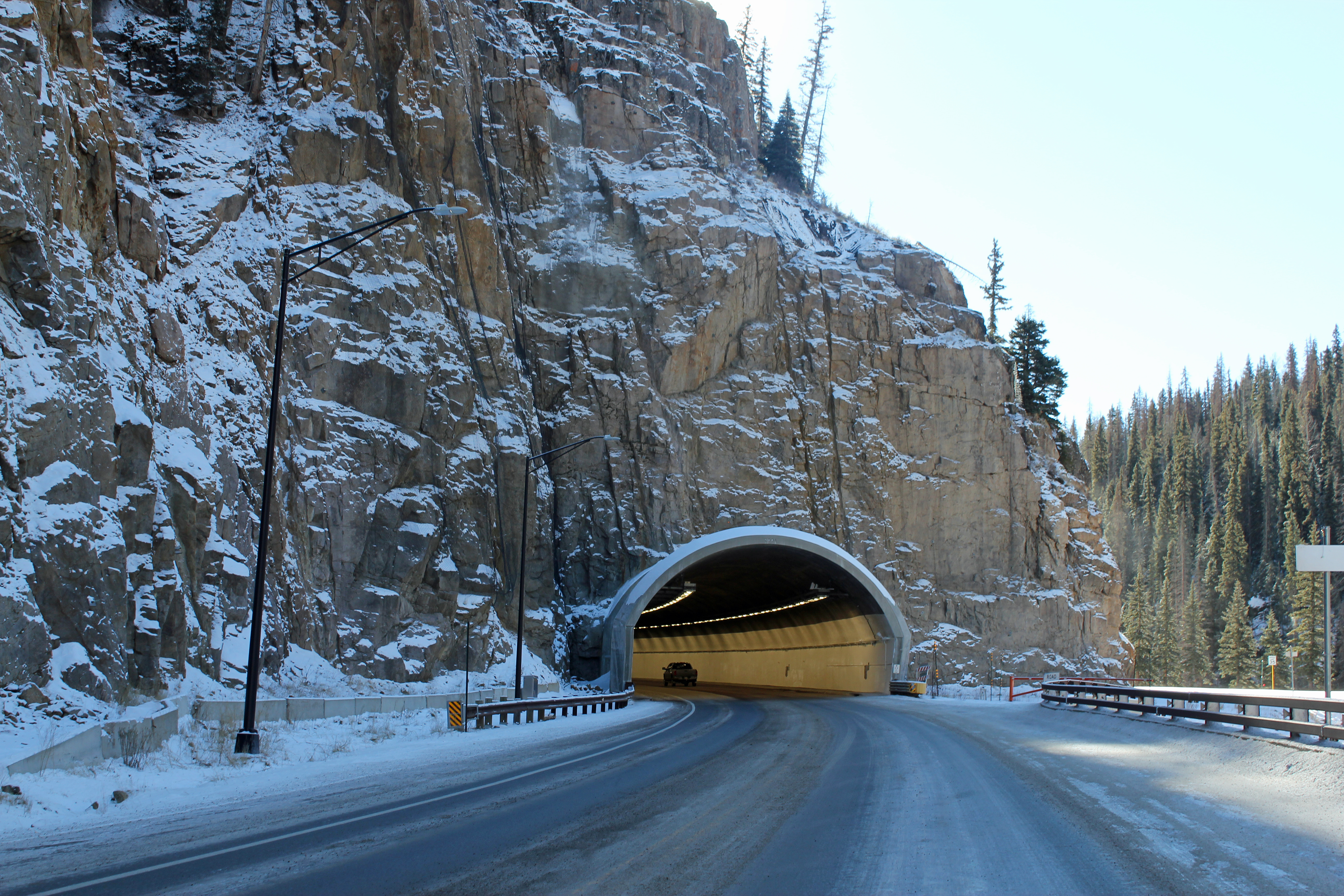
US 160 entering the Wolf Creek Pass tunnel

US 160 enters Colorado near the Four Corners Monument. It goes northeast and intersects US 491, then turns north to enter Cortez with US 491. East of Cortez, a road leads south from US 160 to Mesa Verde National Park. It continues east to Durango, where it intersects US 550. After overlapping with US 550 south of Durango, US 160 turns east and meets US 84 at Pagosa Springs. It then goes northeast and crosses the Continental Divide at Wolf Creek Pass, the area made popular in 1975 in C.W. McCall's album Wolf Creek Pass.

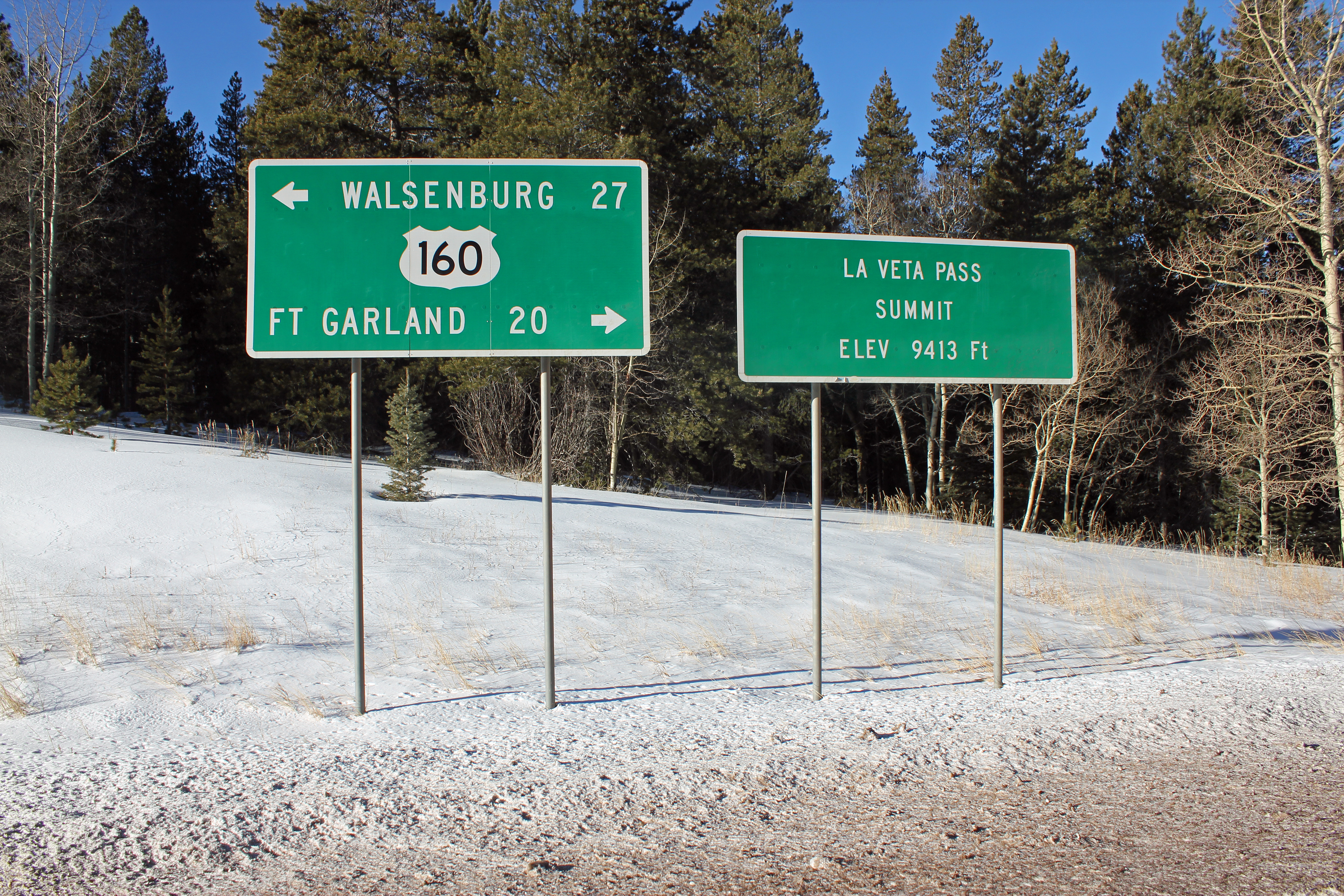
US 160 in La Veta Pass

From Wolf Creek Pass, US 160 continues northeast and turns east at South Fork. At Monte Vista, an overlap begins with US 285, which continues southeast into Alamosa. It turns east, then goes northeast to go through North La Veta Pass, then continues east to Walsenburg, where it intersects Interstate 25 (I-25).

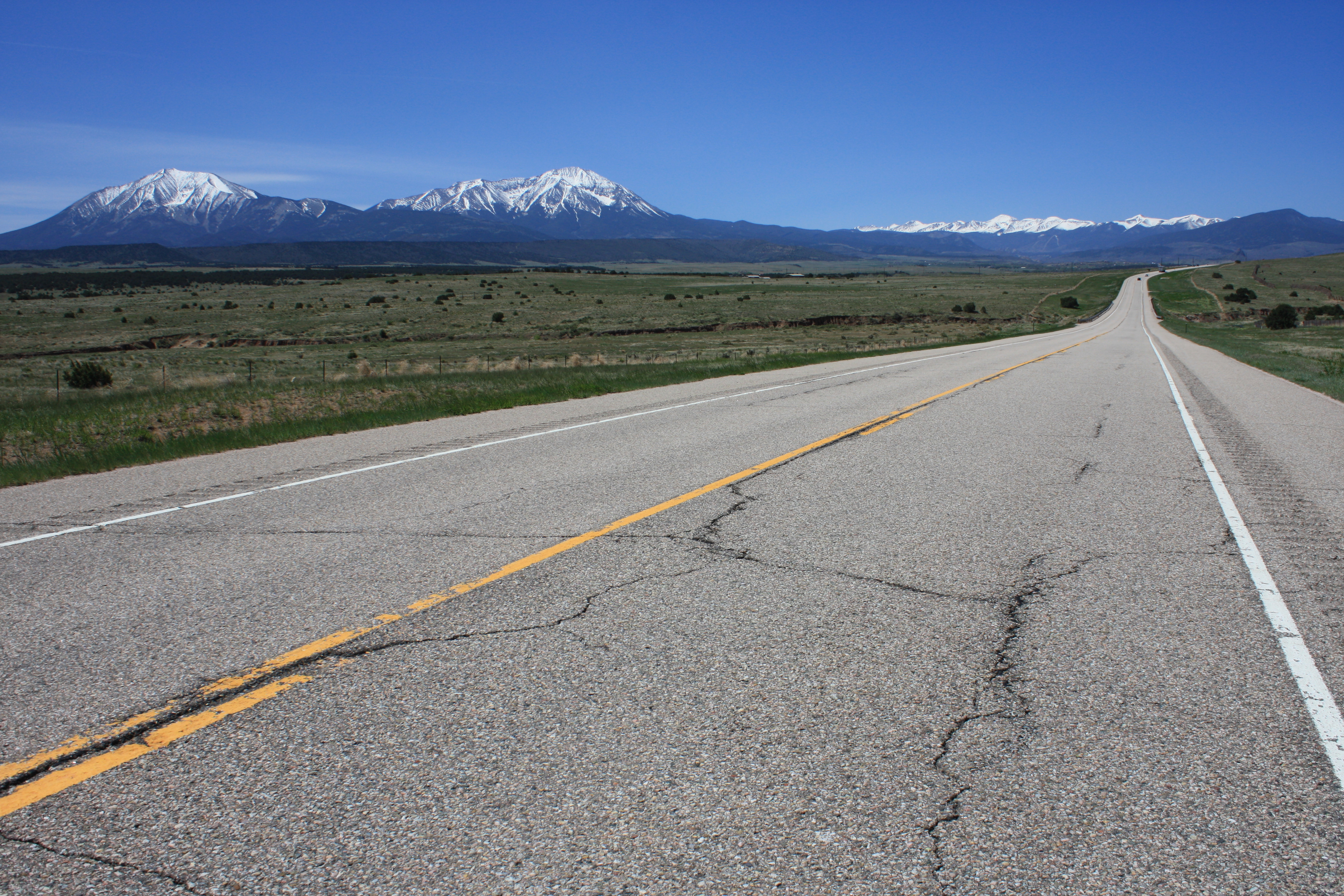
The Spanish Peaks (East Spanish Peak at far left, West Spanish Peak to its right) and Trinchera Peak in the distance, taken from along U.S. 160, about 8 miles (13 km) west of Walsenburg

From Walsenburg, US 160 continues south with I-25 to Trinidad, then turns northeast to intersect US 350. It continues east, passing through the Comanche National Grassland before intersecting the concurrent US 287 and US 385 south of Springfield. It continues east and enters Kansas east of Walsh.

== History ==
U.S. Highway 164
- Location: Flagstaff, AZ–Cortez, CO
- Existed: 1964–1970

As commissioned in 1930 the western terminus was Trinidad. In 1939, US 160 absorbed all of former route U.S. Highway 450 which ran from US 50 at Crescent Junction, Utah to US 85 at Walsenburg.

In 1970, many US Highways in the Four Corners region were realigned. US 160 was diverted southwesterly from Cortez to follow its present route past the Four Corners into Arizona, absorbing the route numbered U.S. Highway 164.

In 2021, the portion of the highway between Walsenburg and the highway's junction with Colorado State Highway 12 was designated a National Scenic Byway. The designation, which includes State Highway 12 and the county roads over Cordova Pass, is called the Scenic Highway of Legends.

== Junction list ==
County	Location	mi	km	Destinations	Notes
Montezuma		0.00	0.00	US 160 west – Four Corners, Flagstaff AZ	Continuation into New Mexico
Montezuma		4.9	7.9	SH 41	Southern Terminus of SH-41
Montezuma		18.2	29.3	US 491 – Shiprock	Western end of US 491 concurrency
Montezuma	Cortez	37.9	61.0	US 491 – Monticello	Eastern end of US 491 concurrency
Montezuma	Cortez	40.3	64.9	SH 145 – Telluride	Southern Terminus of SH-145
Montezuma	Mancos	45	72	Mesa Top Ruins Road – Mesa Verde National Park	Interchange
Montezuma	Mancos	54.6	87.9	US 160 Bus.	
Montezuma	Mancos	56.0	90.1	SH 184 – Dolores	
Montezuma	Mancos	57.0	91.7	US 160 Bus.	
La Plata	Hesperus	72.7	117.0	SH 140 – Kline, Redmesa	
La Plata	Durango	83.2	133.9	US 550 – Silverton	Western end of US 550 concurrency
La Plata	Durango	85.9	138.2	SH 3 north	
La Plata		87.6	141.0	US 550 – Bloomfield	Eastern end of US 550 concurrency
La Plata		90.6	145.8	Wilson Gulch Drive	Interchange; access to Mercy Regional Medical Center
La Plata		90.6	145.8	SH 172 – Oxford	Access to Durango-La Plata County Airport
La Plata	Bayfield	100.6	161.9	US 160 Bus.	
La Plata	Bayfield	102.7	165.3	US 160 Bus.	
Archuleta		126.1	202.9	SH 151 – Arboles	
Archuleta	Pagosa Springs	143.5	230.9	US 84 east – Chama	Western terminus of US 84
Mineral	No major junctions				
Rio Grande	South Fork	184.9	297.6	SH 149 – Rio Grande National Forest	
Rio Grande	Del Norte	200.9	323.3	SH 112 – Center	
Rio Grande	Monte Vista	214.5	345.2	US 285 north (North Broadway) / SH 15 south (South Broadway)	Western end of US 285 concurrency
Alamosa	Alamosa	231.6	372.7	SH 17 south / US 285 – Antonito	Eastern end of US 285 concurrency; western end of SH 17 concurrency
Alamosa	Rio Grande	232.6	374.3	Bridge	
Alamosa	Alamosa East	232.8	374.7	SH 17 north – Salida, Buena Vista	Eastern end of SH 17 concurrency
Costilla		246.7	397.0	SH 150 north – Great Sand Dunes National Park	
Costilla	Fort Garland	257.1	413.8	SH 159 – San Luis	
Huerfano		292.9	471.4	SH 12 – La Veta	
Huerfano	Walsenburg	304.1	489.4	I-25 BL south (Main Street south) to I-25 south	Western end of I-25 Bus. concurrency
Huerfano	Walsenburg	304.3	489.7	Main Street north (I-25 BL north)	Eastern end of I-25 Bus. concurrency
Huerfano	Walsenburg	305.2	491.2	I-25 north (US 85 / US 87 north) / SH 10 east – Pueblo, La Junta	Western end of I-25/US 85/US 87 concurrency; I-25 exit 50; western terminus of SH 10
See I-25
Las Animas	Trinidad	340.4	547.8	I-25 south (US 85 / US 87 south) / Goddard Avenue	Eastern end of I-25/US 85/US 87 concurrency; I-25 exit 15
Las Animas	Trinidad	340.4	547.8	SH 239 north	No access eastbound
Las Animas	Trinidad	341.2	549.1	Main Street / Santa Fe Trail Scenic Byway	Serves Mt. San Rafael Hospital; former US 160 west
Las Animas		346.6	557.8	US 350 east / Santa Fe Trail Scenic Byway – La Junta	Access to Perry Stokes Airport
Las Animas		375.8	604.8	SH 389 – Branson	
Las Animas		409.5	659.0	SH 109 – La Junta	
Baca	Springfield	457.1	735.6	US 287 / US 385 – Amarillo, Odessa, Denver, Lamar	
Baca		465.0	748.3	SH 100 – Vilas	
Baca		490.0	788.6	US-160 east – Johnson City	Continuation into Kansas
1.000 mi = 1.609 km; 1.000 km = 0.621 mi: Concurrency terminus; Incomplete access

== See also ==
- List of U.S. Highways in Colorado

U.S. Route 160
Previous state: New Mexico	Colorado	Next state: Kansas
