= Colorado State Highway 112 =

Highway in Colorado

State Highway 112
- SH 112 highlighted in red

Route information
- Maintained by CDOT
- Length: 27.802 mi (44.743 km)

Major junctions
- West end: US 160 at Del Norte
- US 285 near Center
- East end: SH 17 at Hooper

Location
- Country: United States
- State: Colorado
- Counties: Rio Grande, Saguache, Alamosa

Highway system
- Colorado State Highway System; Interstate; US; State; Scenic
← SH 110	→ SH 113

State Highway 112 (SH 112) is a 27.802-mile-long (44.743 km) state highway in southern Colorado. Built in 1916 and formally defined in 1922, the route begins at its western end in Del Norte at a junction with U.S. Highway 160 (US 160). From there the road travels east crossing US 285 two miles (3.2 km) west of Center before reaching its eastern terminus at Hooper where it meets SH 17.

== Route description ==
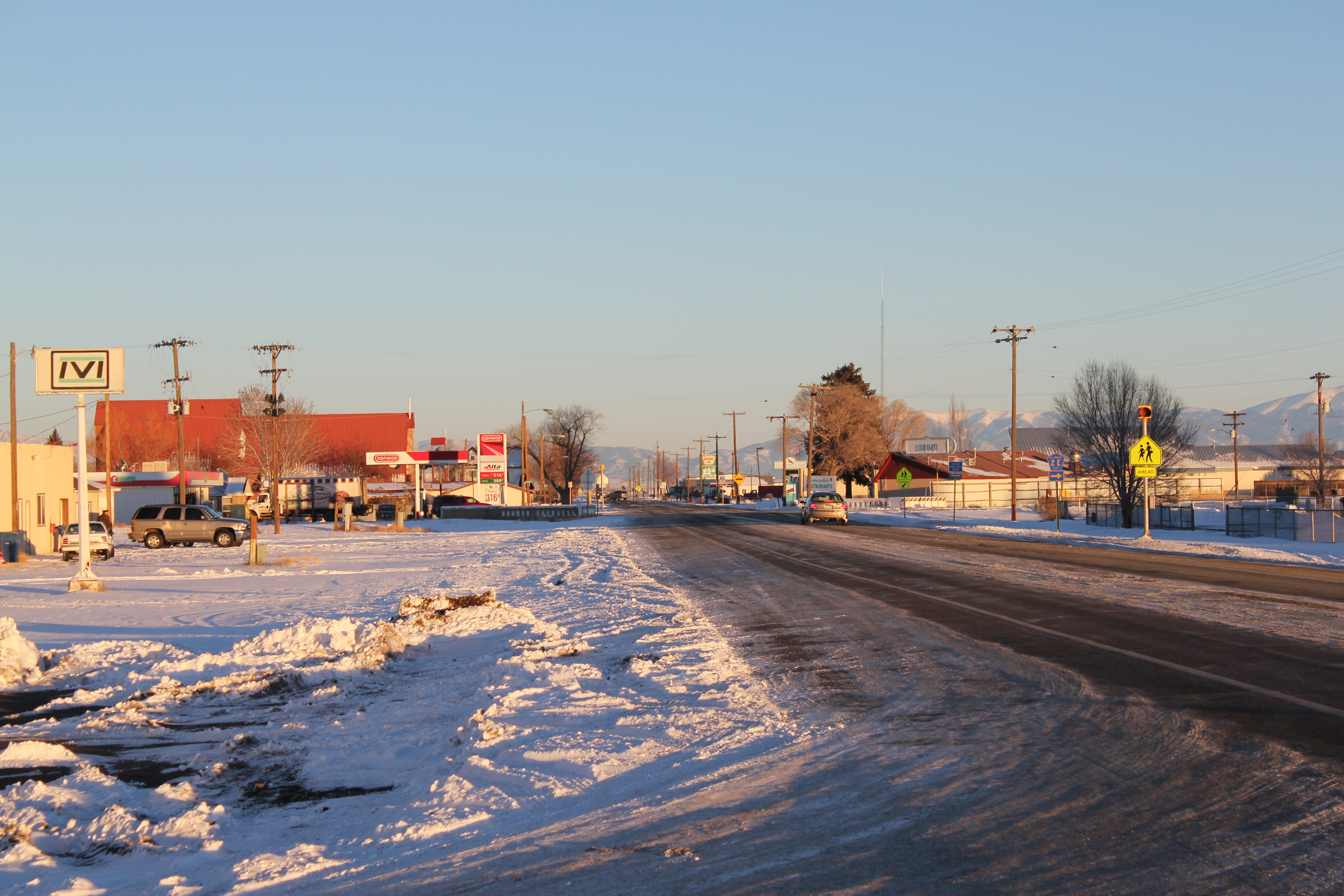
SH 112 in Center

The route begins at US 160 in central Del Norte. Here, it begins northward along Oak Street before crossing the Rio Grande, where the route exits the city and curves northeastward. The highway then straddles the Rio Grande – Saguache county line as it travels in a northeasterly direction. Soon, it intersects County Route 374, which traverses east all the way to US 285. The route then suddenly curves eastward when it meets Twelve Mile Road. As the route continues to meet numerous county roads along its length, the land along the side of the road transitions from plain grassland to circular-shaped fields of crops. The route meets US 285 approximately twelve miles east of Del Norte.

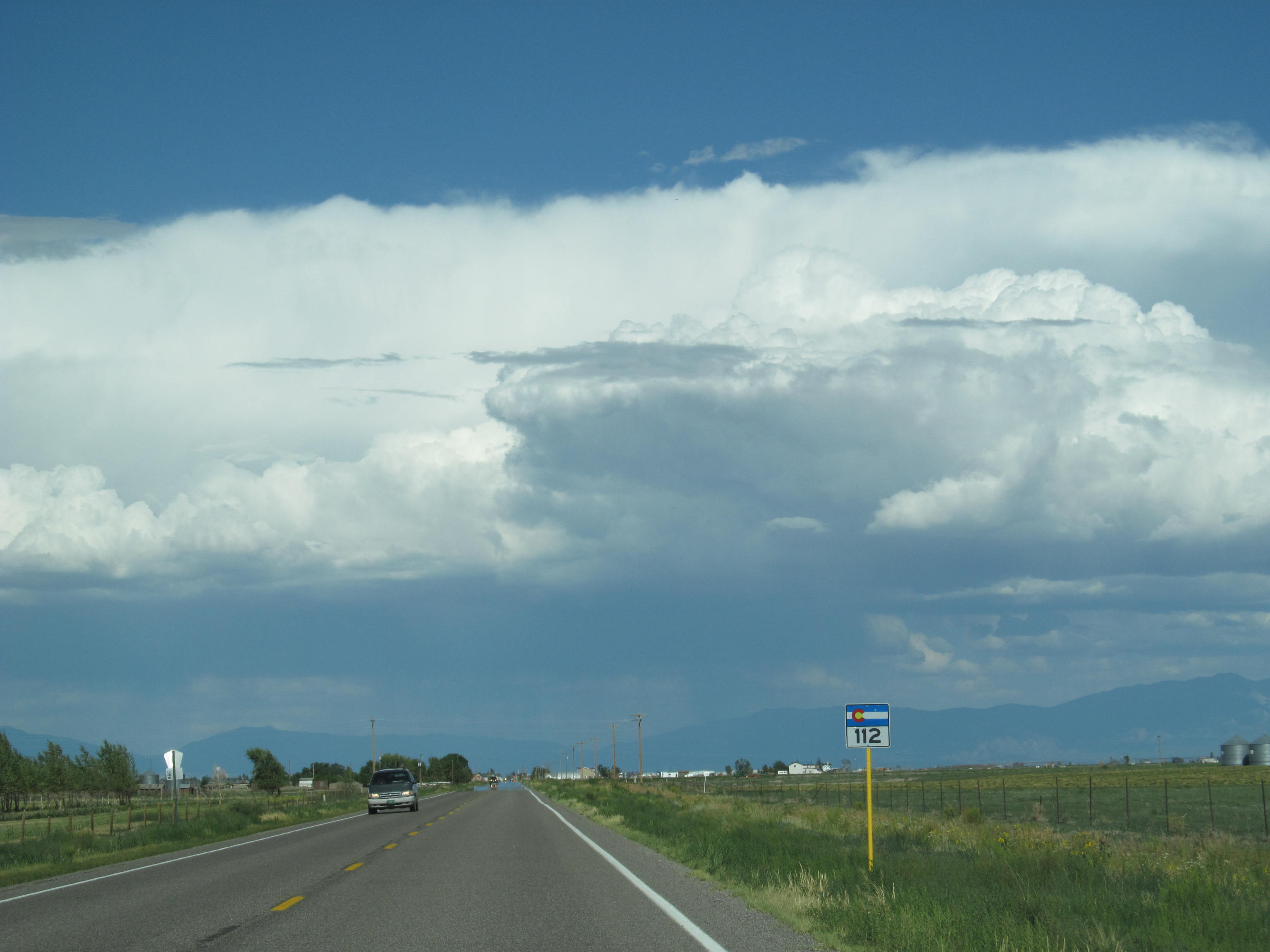
SH 112 with mountains in background

East of US 285, the route enters the town of Center, where it skirts the south side of town as 8th Street. Here, it meets a railroad that connects the town to Sugar Junction farther south. The route moves east through farmland, where it meets County Road 100, which continues south to SH 15. It then skirts along the county line all the way east to SH 17 at the north side of Hooper.

== History ==
In 1916, a 12-mile (19 km) gravel road numbered as 10-S ran from Center to Hooper. Another unsurfaced part of the road continued to Alamosa from Hooper. By the late 1910s, the Highway Department of Colorado had built State Highway 68, which ran from Del Norte to SH 36. When built, the route had a five-mile (6.0 km) gap along the Rio Grande – Saguache county line, on which work began in the 1920s. In 1922, SH 68 was renumbered as SH 112 from Del Norte to Hooper.

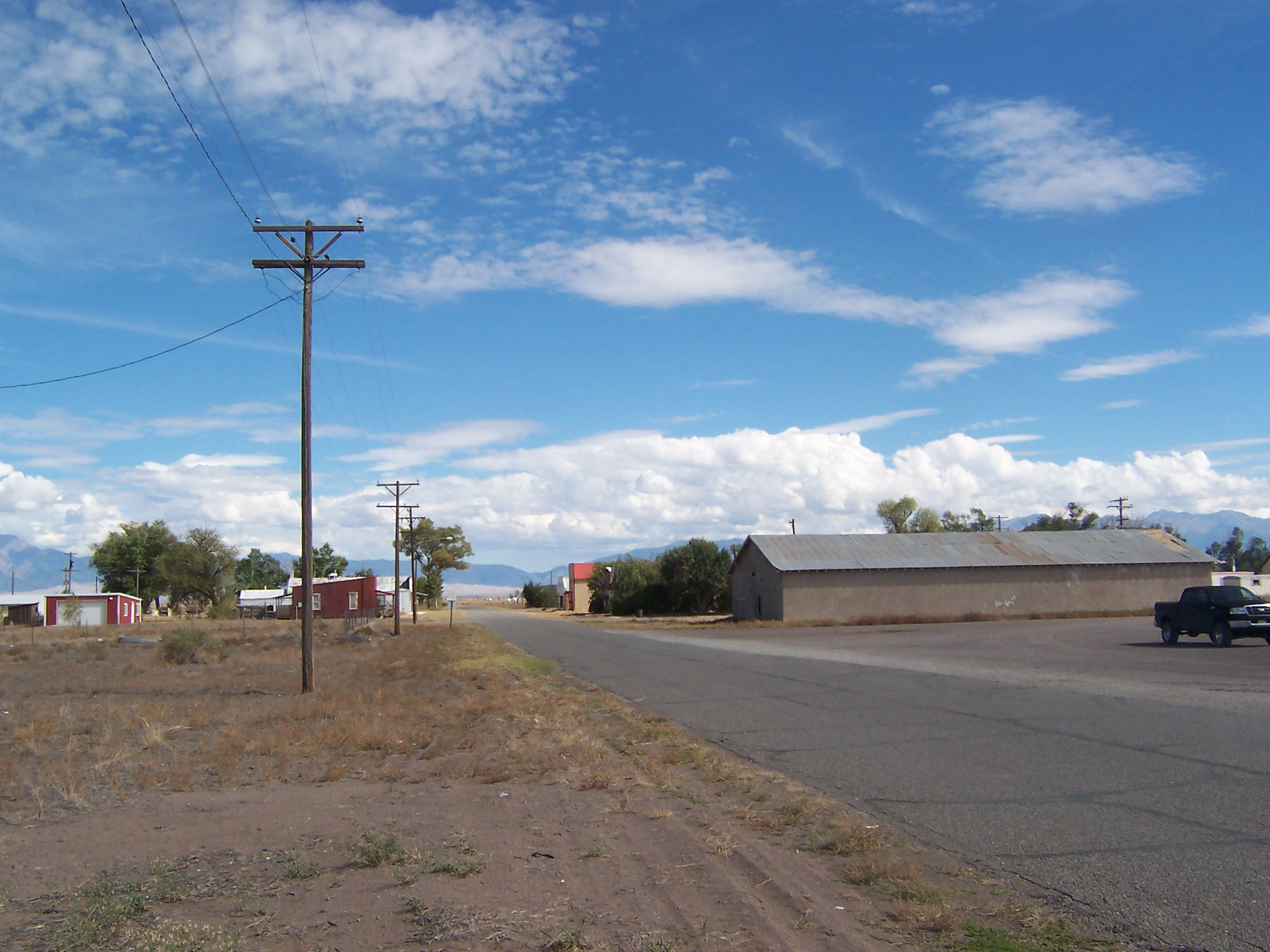
Main Street in Hooper near the SH 112 junction

By 1930, SH 112 had been paved from Del Norte to the county line. Because the residents of San Luis Valley sought better roads, the Department of Highways began improving SH 112 around the area, but the highway was not fully surfaced until 1946. The next year, Rio Grande and Saguache counties paid to resurface the rest of the road in asphalt. Since 1947, there have been no major realignments in the routing.

== Major intersections ==
County	Location	mi	km	Destinations	Notes
Rio Grande	Del Norte	0.000	0.000	US 160 – Monte Vista, Pagosa Springs	Western terminus; serves Rio Grande Hospital; road continues south as Oak Street
Rio Grande–Saguache county line		13.138	21.144	US 285 – Saguache, Monte Vista	
Saguache–Alamosa county line	Hooper	27.802	44.743	SH 17 – Mosca, Alamosa, Moffat, Poncha Springs	Eastern terminus
1.000 mi = 1.609 km; 1.000 km = 0.621 mi

== See also ==
- List of state highways in Colorado
