= Colorado State Highway 239 =

State highway in Colorado, United States

State Highway 239
- SH 239 highlighted in red

Route information
- Maintained by CDOT
- Length: 3.022 mi (4.863 km)

Major junctions
- South end: I-25 / US 85 / US 87 / US 160 in Trinidad
- North end: CR 32 in El Moro

Location
- Country: United States
- State: Colorado
- Counties: Las Animas

Highway system
- Colorado State Highway System; Interstate; US; State; Scenic
← SH 233	→ SH 257

State Highway 239 (SH 239) is a state highway in Las Animas County, Colorado. SH 239's southern terminus is at U.S. Route 160 (US 160) in Trinidad, and the northern terminus is at County Route 32 (CR 32) in El Moro.

== Route description ==
SH 239 runs 3.3 miles (5.3 km), starting at a junction with US 160 in Trinidad. The highway goes north to a ramp for I-25 northbound, then northeast to end at a junction with CR32 and CR75.

== Major intersections ==
The entire route is in Las Animas County.

Location	mi	km	Destinations	Notes
Trinidad	0.000	0.000	I-25 north (US 85 / US 87 north / US 160 west) To US 160 east (Kit Carson Trail) / I-25 south / Freedom Road	Southern terminus; I-25 exit 15
El Moro	3.022	4.863	CR 32 east / Road 75.0	Northern terminus; road continues north as Road 75.0
1.000 mi = 1.609 km; 1.000 km = 0.621 mi

== See also ==
- List of state highways in Colorado
