= Coye Dunn =

American football player (1916–2000)

No. 30
- Position: Defensive back

Personal information
- Born: March 7, 1916; Vilas, Colorado
- Died: February 8, 2000 (aged 83)

Career information
- College: Southern California

Career history
- 1943: Washington Redskins
- Stats at Pro Football Reference

Coye Elvis Dunn (March 7, 1916 – February 8, 2000) was an American football defensive back in the National Football League for the Washington Redskins. He played college football at the University of Southern California in 1936.

== Biography ==
Dunn was born in Vilas, Colorado, and raised in San Diego, California, the son of Joseph Gilbert Dunn and Isabel Harris Dunn. He graduated from San Diego High School and attended the University of Southern California, where he played football in 1936, but had a bout with typhoid fever that prevented him playing in 1937. He returned to spring drills in 1938, but was cut from the team in August when the university denied him admission for disciplinary reasons. During World War II, he was a member of the San Diego Bombers, and he played professional football in 1943, with the Washington Redskins.

Dunn eloped with Phyllis Sue Listmann in 1936. They had two sons. He died in 2000, at the age of 83.
