= Trinchera =

Trinchera may refer to:

- Dominick Trinchera, American mobster
- Trinchera, Colorado, an unincorporated community in Las Animas County, Colorado
- Trinchera Cave Archeological District in Las Animas County, Colorado
- Trinchera Celeste, an independent supporters group of O'Higgins, a football club in the Primera División de Chile
- Trinchera Creek, a tributary of the Rio Grande in Costilla County, Colorado
- Trinchera Creek (Las Animas County, Colorado), a tributary of the Purgatoire River in southeastern Colorado
- Trinchera Peak, a mountain in Colorado
- Trinchera, an archaeological site on Pukara Mountain in Peru
- Trincheras, a town and municipality in Sonora, Mexico
- The Trincheras Formation, a geological formation in Colombia
