= Colorado State Highway 3 =

State highway in Colorado, United States

State Highway 3
- SH 3 highlighted in red

Route information
- Maintained by CDOT
- Length: 2.444 mi (3.933 km)

Major junctions
- South end: US 160 / US 550 in Durango
- North end: Santa Rite Drive in Durango

Location
- Country: United States
- State: Colorado
- Counties: La Plata

Highway system
- Colorado State Highway System; Interstate; US; State; Scenic
| ← SH 2 | → SH 5 |

Colorado State Highway 3 (SH-3) is a short north–south state highway in La Plata County, Colorado, United States (almost entirely within the southern part of the city of Durango). It follows the former alignment of U.S. Route 160 (US 160) and U.S. Route 550 (US 550) south of downtown, lying across the Animas River from the modern highway constructed about 1980.

== Route description ==
SH 3 begins in southern Durango at US 160/US 550 (Camino del Rio), just south of that route's crossing of the Animas River to the Durango Mall. SH 3 travels northward along the former alignment of US 160/US 550 (an even older alignment is now County Road 209, Sawmill Road), following the eastern bank of the Animas River for about 1.75 miles (2.82 km). After leaving and re-entering the city of Durango, SH 3 ends at Santa Rita Drive, which curves to the southwest before meeting US 160/US 550 about 0.25 miles (0.40 km) later. The former alignment of US 160/US 550 does not use Santa Rita Drive, but instead continues north on East Eighth Avenue and turns west on College Drive to Main Avenue, where the two routes used to split.

== History ==
A new alignment of US 160/US 550 was built in 1979-1980, crossing the Animas River twice south of downtown Durango. The old road east of the river was redesignated SH 3 in 1981-1982.

== Major intersections ==
The entire route is in Durango, La Plata County.

| mi | km | Destinations | Notes |
|---|---|---|---|
| 0.000 | 0.000 | US 160 / US 550 (Camino del Rio) – Bayfield, Cedar Hill (New Mexico) | Southern terminus |
| 2.194 | 3.531 | Santa Rita Drive – US 160/US 550 | Northern terminus; road continues north as East Eighth Avenue |
1.000 mi = 1.609 km; 1.000 km = 0.621 mi

== See also ==
- List of state highways in Colorado
- List of highways numbered 3
