= Colorado State Highway 101 =

State highway in Colorado, United States

State Highway 101
- Map of Bent County in southeastern Colorado with SH 101 highlighted in red

Route information
- Maintained by CDOT
- Length: 21.413 mi (34.461 km)

Major junctions
- South end: CR K/CR 14 in Toonerville
- North end: US 50 in Las Animas

Location
- Country: United States
- State: Colorado
- Counties: Bent

Highway system
- Colorado State Highway System; Interstate; US; State; Scenic
← SH 100	→ SH 103

State Highway 101 (SH 101) is a 21.413-mile (34.461 km) state highway in western Bent County, Colorado, United States, that connects CR K and CR 14 in Toonerville with U.S. Route 50 (US 50) in Las Animas.

== Route description ==
SH 101 begins at a junction with CR K and CR 14 in Toonerville. From its southern terminus it heads northerly to cross the Purgatoire River and end at US 50 in Las Animas.

== Major intersections ==
The entire route is in Bent County.

Location	mi	km	Destinations	Notes
Toonerville	0.000	0.000	CR K (County Road K)	Southern terminus
	20.762– 20.798	33.413– 33.471	Bridge over Purgatoire River	
Las Animas	21.413	34.461	US 50 west (Ambassador Thompson Boulevard) – La Junta, Pueblo US 50 east (Ambassador Thompson Boulevard) – Hasty, Lamar	Northern terminus
Las Animas	21.413	34.461	Carson Avenue north	Continuation north beyond northern terminus
1.000 mi = 1.609 km; 1.000 km = 0.621 mi

== See also ==
- List of state highways in Colorado
