= Colorado State Highway 110 =

State highway in Silverton, Colorado, United States

State Highway 110
- SH 110 highlighted in red

Route information
- Maintained by CDOT
- Length: 0.186 mi (299 m)
- Existed: 1920s–present

Major junctions
- West end: US 550 in Silverton
- East end: CDOT maintenance yard in Silverton

Location
- Country: United States
- State: Colorado
- County: San Juan

Highway system
- Colorado State Highway System; Interstate; US; State; Scenic
← SH 109	→ SH 112

State Highway 110 (SH 110) is a state highway in Silverton, Colorado. SH 110's western terminus is at U.S. Route 550 (US 550) in Silverton, and the eastern terminus is at the CDOT maintenance yard.

== Route description ==
The route begins at US 550 in Silverton and runs for 740 feet (230 m) to its terminus at a CDOT maintenance yard.

== History ==
The route was established in the 1920s, when it began at US 550 in Silverton and headed north to Howardsville. SH 110 was extended north to Eureka by 1938. The northern terminus was moved to Gladstone in 1961. Except for the 740 feet (230 m) left today, the entire route was deleted north of Silverton in 2003; signage was removed along the entire route. On November 24, 2006, CDOT no longer called SH 110 a real part of the state highway system; SH 110 still exists.

== Major intersections ==
The entire route is in Silverton, San Juan County.

mi	km	Destinations	Notes
0.000	0.000	US 550 – Durango, Ouray	Western terminus
0.186	0.299	CDOT maintenance yard	Eastern terminus
1.000 mi = 1.609 km; 1.000 km = 0.621 mi

== See also ==
- List of state highways in Colorado
