= Trinchera Peak =

Mountain in Colorado, United States

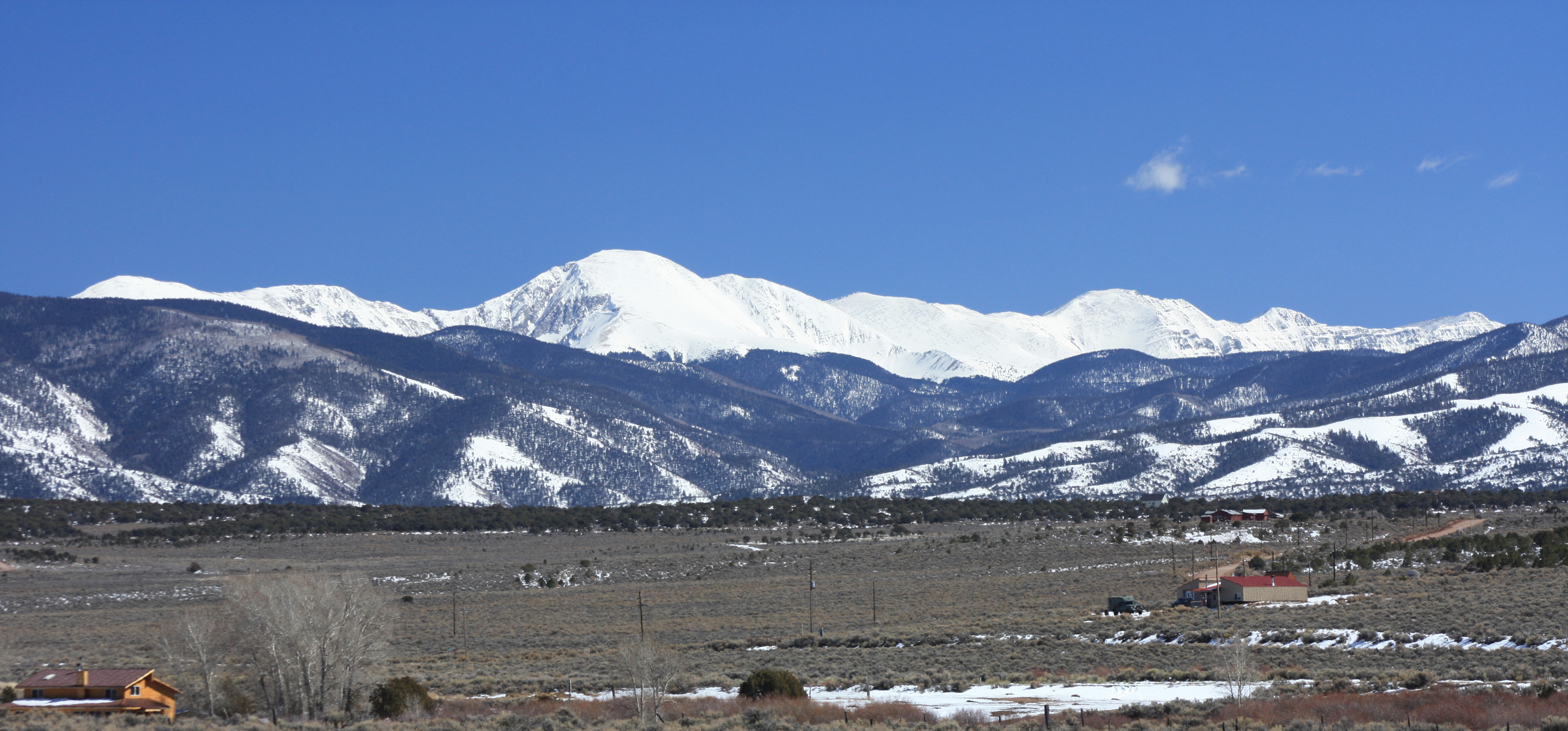
- Trinchera Peak taken from along U.S. Route 160, just northeast of Fort Garland.

Highest point
- Elevation: 13,510 ft (4,120 m)
- Coordinates: 37°17′22″N 105°09′54″W

Geography
- Location within Colorado
- Location: Costilla County and Huerfano County, Colorado, U.S.
- Parent range: Culebra Range
- Topo map: USGS Trinchera Peak

Trinchera Peak is a mountain in Costilla County and Huerfano County in the U.S. state of Colorado. It is located in the Culebra Range.
