= El Moro, Colorado =

Census-designated place in Las Animas County, Colorado, United States

- Census-designated place
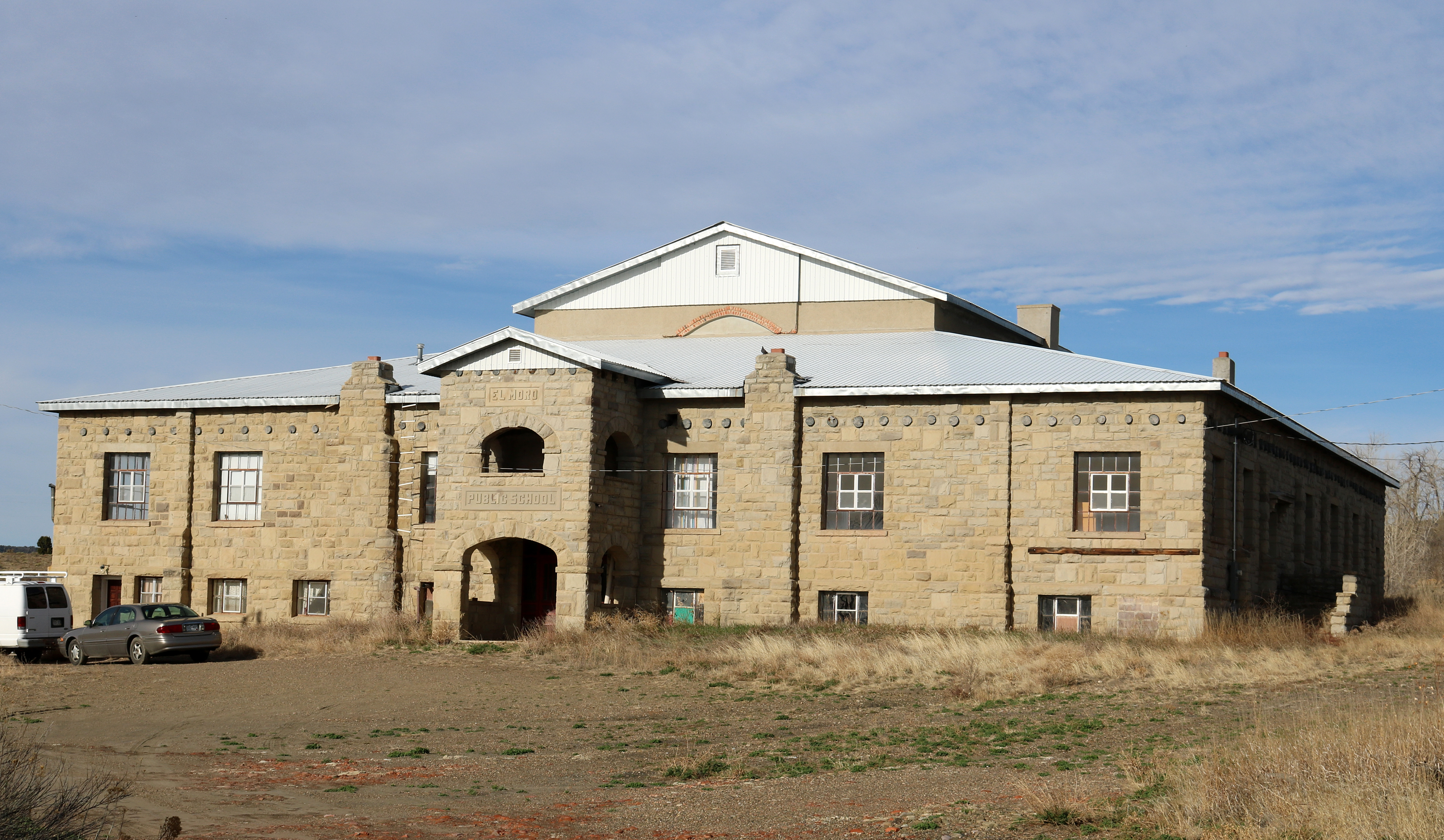
- The former El Moro Public School (now privately held).

- Location of the El Moro CDP in Las Animas County, Colorado
- Coordinates: 37°14′48″N 104°27′01″W
- Country: United States
- State: Colorado
- County: Las Animas

Government
  - Type: Unincorporated community
  - Body: Las Animas County

Area
  - Total: 11.116 sq mi (28.791 km^{2})
  - Land: 11.091 sq mi (28.725 km^{2})
  - Water: 0.025 sq mi (0.066 km^{2})
- Elevation: 5,925 ft (1,806 m)

Population (2020)
  - Total: 216
  - Density: 19.5/sq mi (7.52/km^{2})
- Time zone: UTC−07:00 (MST)
  - Summer (DST): UTC−06:00 (MDT)
- ZIP code: Trinidad 81082
- Area code: 719
- GNIS CDP ID: 2583233
- FIPS code: 08-24290

El Moro is an unincorporated community and a census-designated place (CDP) located in and governed by Las Animas County, Colorado, United States. The population of the El Moro CDP was 216 at the United States Census 2020.

== History ==
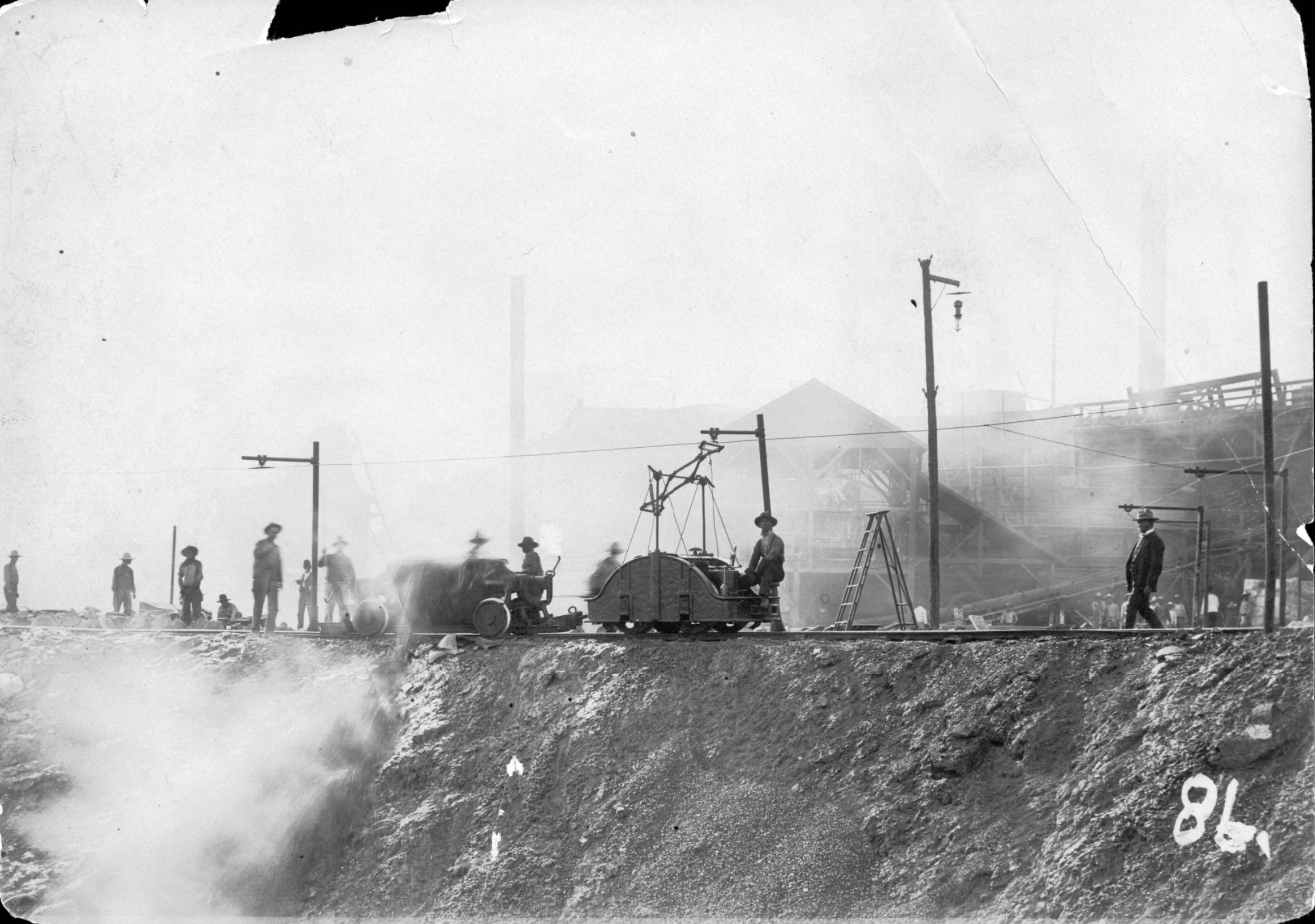
Colorado Fuel & Iron mine at El Moro, c. 1900

The El Moro, Colorado Territory, post office operated from April 17, 1876, until January 1896 The Trinidad, Colorado, post office (ZIP code 81082) now serves the area. El Moro is a name derived from Spanish meaning "the Moor".

After the company was established in 1892, Colorado Fuel & Iron took over the El Moro operation. During its years of operation, 8,063,076 tons of coal were shipped from El Moro on CF&I's narrow gauge railway, connecting them with the Colorado & Southern line.

== Geography ==
El Moro is in west-central Las Animas County, bordering the northeast side of the city of Trinidad, the county seat. U.S. Route 160 runs along the southeast edge of the CDP, leading southwest 3.5 miles (5.6 km) to the center of Trinidad and east 119 miles (192 km) to Springfield. U.S. Route 350 branches off from US 160 at the eastern edge of El Moro and leads northeast 73 miles (117 km) to La Junta. The city of Pueblo is 81 miles (130 km) to the north via Interstate 25, which runs just west of the El Moro CDP. The Purgatoire River runs through the community, flowing northeast toward the Arkansas River.

The El Moro CDP has an area of 7,114 acres (28.791 km^{2}), including 16 acres (0.066 km^{2}) of water.

== Demographics ==
The United States Census Bureau initially defined the El Moro CDP for the United States Census 2010.

El Moro CDP, Colorado
Year	Pop.	±%
2010	221	—
2020	216	−2.3%
Source: United States Census Bureau

== See also ==
- List of census-designated places in Colorado
