= Hooper, Colorado =

Town in Colorado, United States

- Statutory town
- Town of Hooper
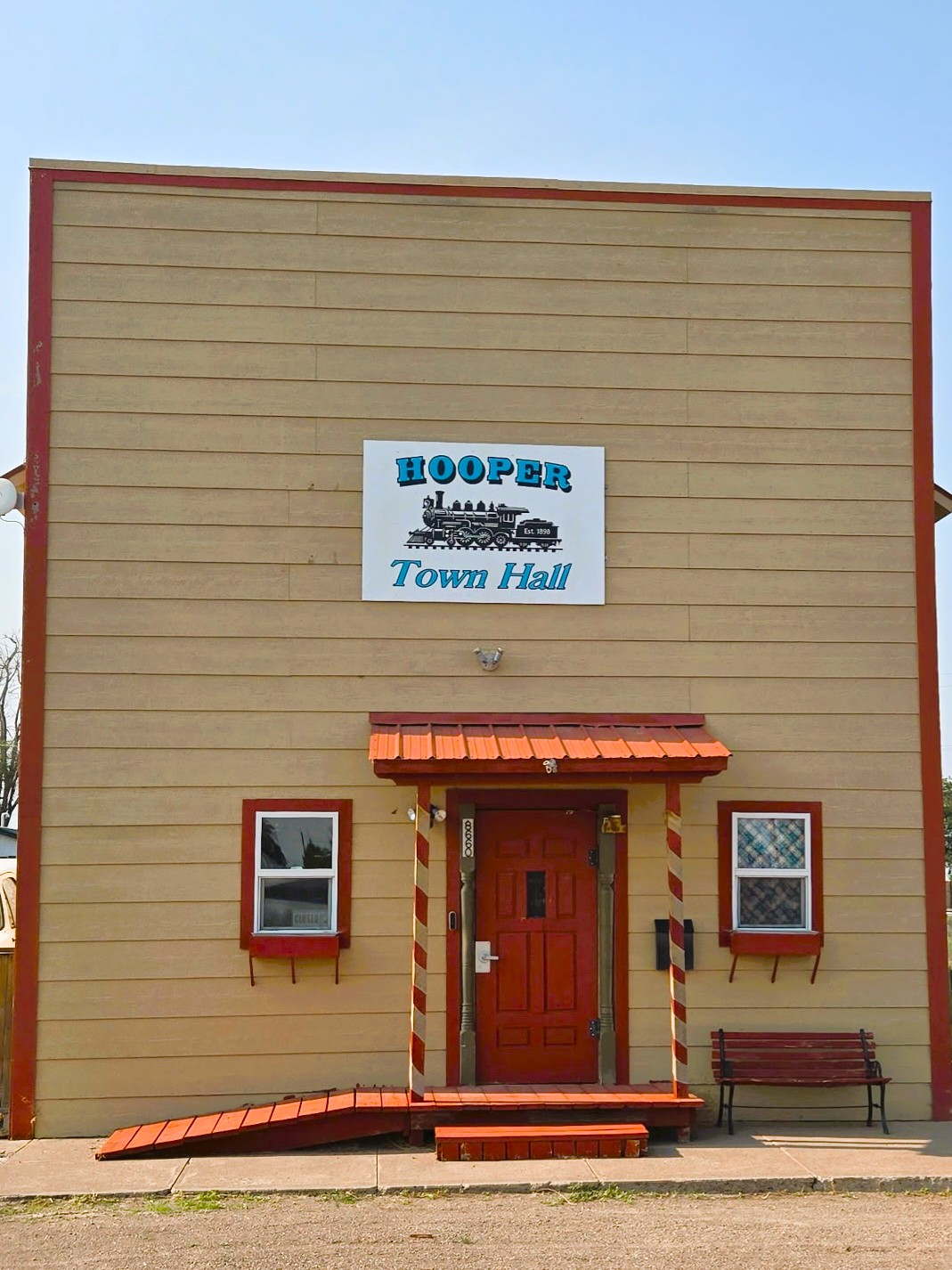
- Hooper Town Hall

- Location of the Town of Hooper in the Alamosa County, Colorado
- Coordinates: 37°44′45″N 105°52′37″W
- Country: United States
- State: Colorado
- County: Alamosa County
- Incorporated (town): May 20, 1898

Government
  - Type: Statutory town

Area
  - Total: 0.25 sq mi (0.65 km^{2})
  - Land: 0.25 sq mi (0.65 km^{2})
  - Water: 0 sq mi (0.00 km^{2})
- Elevation: 7,559 ft (2,304 m)

Population (2020)
  - Total: 81
  - Density: 320/sq mi (120/km^{2})
- Time zone: UTC-7 (MST)
  - Summer (DST): UTC-6 (MDT)
- ZIP code: 81136
- Area code: 719
- FIPS code: 08-37380
- GNIS feature ID: 2412766
- Website: Official website

The Town of Hooper is a statutory town located in the San Luis Valley in Alamosa County, Colorado, United States. The population was 81 at the 2020 census.

== Geography ==
According to the United States Census Bureau, the town has a total area of 0.27 square miles (0.7 km^{2}), all of it land.

Nearby points of interest include the Great Sand Dunes National Park and the town of Crestone.

== History ==
The post office at Hooper was known as Garrison from January 26, 1891, until July 17, 1896. The present name honors Major S. Hooper, a railroad official. Hooper was in Costilla County, Colorado until March 8, 1913, when the formation of Alamosa County was authorized by the state legislature.

In 1964, human remains, believed to be those of a Native American of probable Ute origin, were discovered by a local farmer in Hooper.

== Demographics ==
Historical population
Census	Pop.	Note	%±
1900	177		—
1910	131		−26.0%
1920	156		19.1%
1930	155		−0.6%
1940	170		9.7%
1950	103		−39.4%
1960	58		−43.7%
1970	80		37.9%
1980	71		−11.2%
1990	112		57.7%
2000	123		9.8%
2010	103		−16.3%
2020	81		−21.4%

As of the census of 2000, there were 123 people, 48 households, and 33 families residing in the town. The population density was 493.1 inhabitants per square mile (190.4/km^{2}). There were 57 housing units at an average density of 228.5 units per square mile (88.2 units/km^{2}). The racial makeup of the town was 81.30% White, 3.25% Native American, 11.38% from other races, and 4.07% from two or more races. Hispanic or Latino of any race were 18.70% of the population.

There were 48 households, out of which 35.4% had children under the age of 18 living with them, 56.3% were married couples living together, 8.3% had a female householder with no husband present, and 29.2% were non-families. 25.0% of all households were made up of individuals, and 10.4% had someone living alone who was 65 years of age or older. The average household size was 2.56 and the average family size was 3.12.

In the town, the population was spread out, with 28.5% under the age of 18, 8.9% from 18 to 24, 30.1% from 25 to 44, 19.5% from 45 to 64, and 13.0% who were 65 years of age or older. The median age was 41 years. For every 100 females, there were 108.5 males. For every 100 females age 18 and over, there were 95.6 males.

The median income for a household in the town was $31,964, and the median income for a family was $35,833. Males had a median income of $33,333 versus $19,750 for females. The per capita income for the town was $13,897. There were 12.5% of families and 21.0% of the population living below the poverty line, including 34.9% of under eighteens and 10.0% of those over 64.

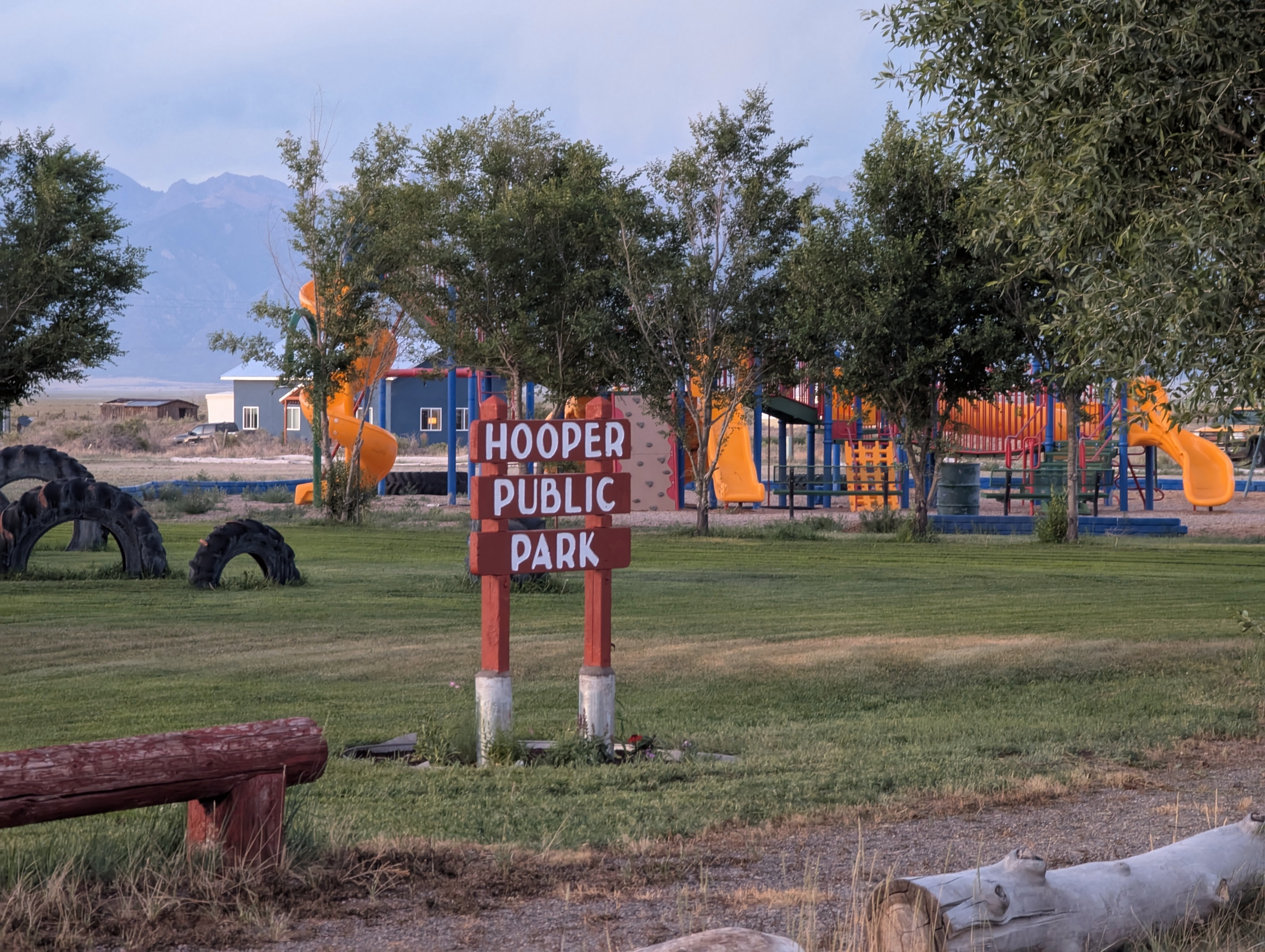
Recently updated with a new playground at the town park

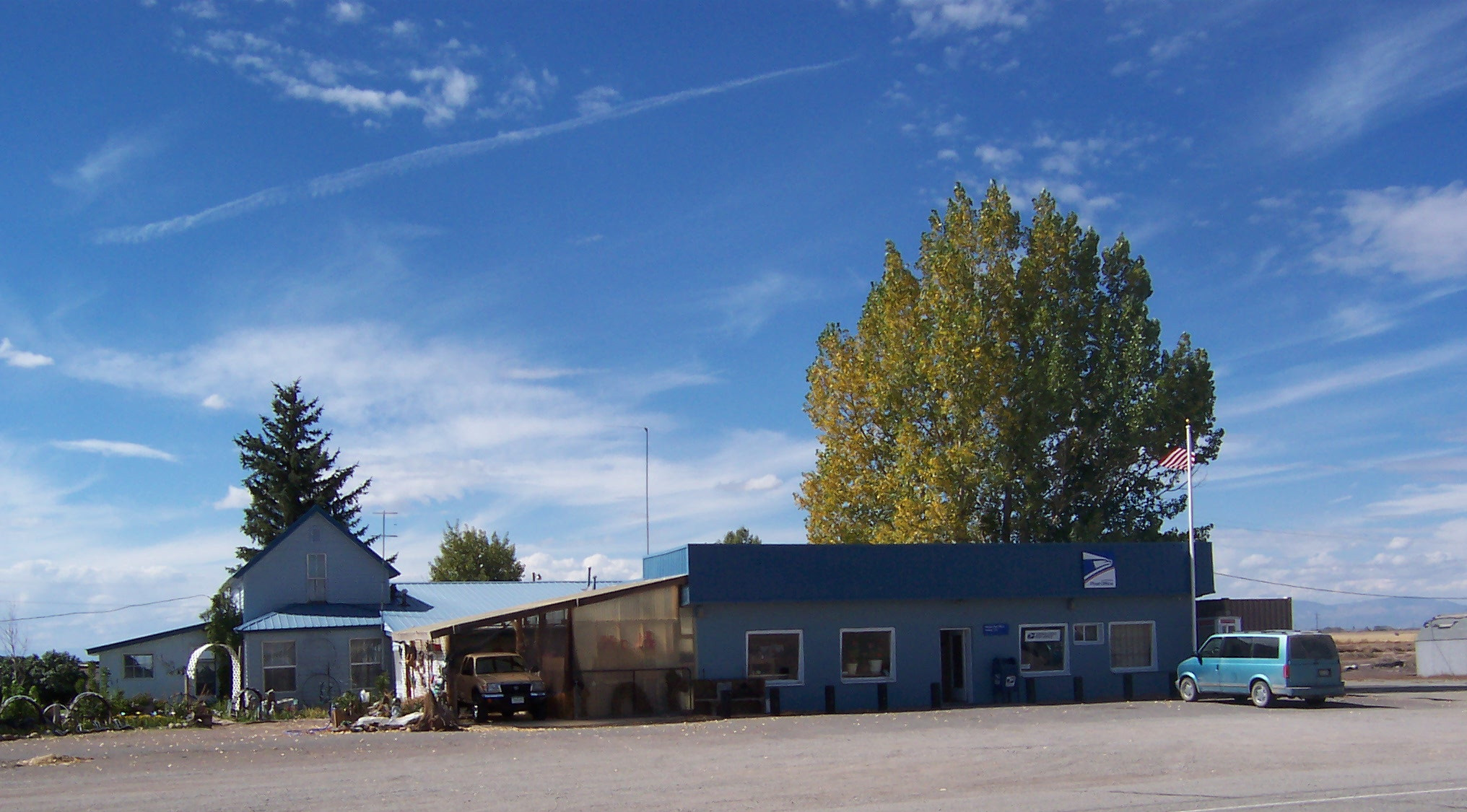
Hooper CO Post Office

== See also ==
- Great Sand Dunes National Park and Preserve
- San Luis Valley
- Sangre de Cristo Range
