= Walsh, Colorado =

Town in Colorado, United States

- Town
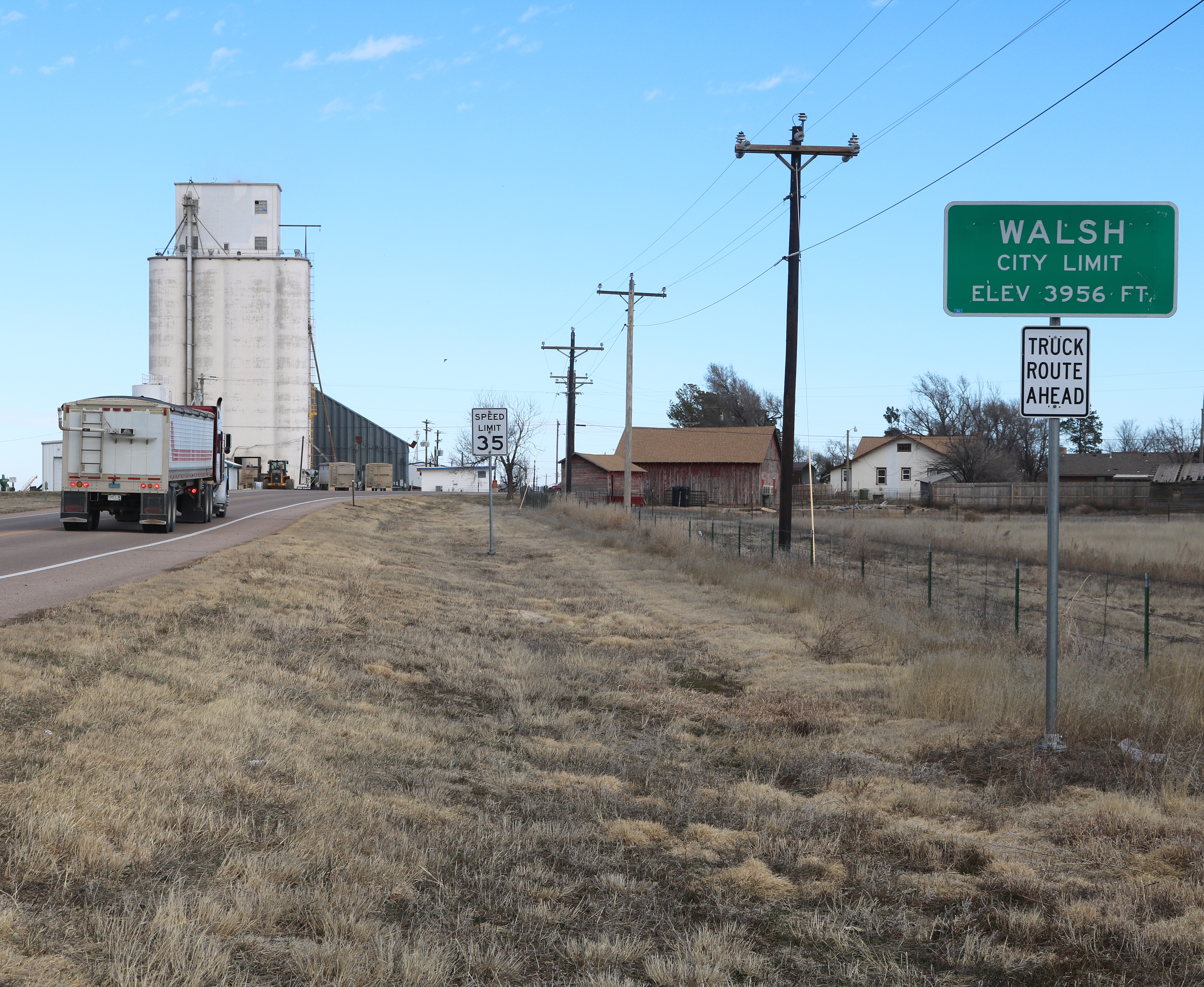
- Entering from the west on Highway 160 (2019)

- Location within Baca County and Colorado
- Coordinates: 37°23′10″N 102°16′48″W
- Country: United States
- State: Colorado
- County: Baca County
- Incorporated: July 19, 1928

Area
  - Total: 0.45 sq mi (1.16 km^{2})
  - Land: 0.45 sq mi (1.16 km^{2})
  - Water: 0 sq mi (0.00 km^{2})
- Elevation: 3,960 ft (1,210 m)

Population (2020)
  - Total: 543
  - Density: 1,210/sq mi (468/km^{2})
- Time zone: UTC−7 (MST)
  - Summer (DST): UTC−6 (MDT)
- ZIP Code: 81090
- Area code: 719
- FIPS code: 08-82460
- GNIS ID: 2413444
- Website: Town of Walsh

Walsh is a statutory town in Baca County, Colorado, United States. The population was 543 at the 2020 census.

== History ==
A post office called Walsh has been in operation since 1926.

The community was named after one Mr. Walsh, an Atchison, Topeka and Santa Fe Railway official.

== Geography ==
Walsh is located in eastern Baca County. U.S. Route 160 passes along the north edge of the town, leading west 20 miles (32 km) to Springfield, the county seat, and east 31 miles (50 km) to Johnson City, Kansas.

According to the United States Census Bureau, the town has a total area of 0.5 square miles (1.3 km^{2}).

=== Climate ===
According to the Köppen Climate Classification system, Walsh has a cold semi-arid climate, abbreviated "BSk" on climate maps. The hottest temperature recorded in Walsh was 110 °F (43.3 °C) on July 28, 2026, while the coldest temperature recorded was −25 °F (−31.7 °C) on January 18, 1984.

Climate data for Walsh, Colorado, 1991–2020 normals, extremes 1967–present
Month	Jan	Feb	Mar	Apr	May	Jun	Jul	Aug	Sep	Oct	Nov	Dec	Year
Record high °F (°C)	80 (27)	85 (29)	97 (36)	96 (36)	102 (39)	108 (42)	110 (43)	106 (41)	105 (41)	98 (37)	88 (31)	80 (27)	110 (43)
Mean maximum °F (°C)	69.0 (20.6)	73.3 (22.9)	81.9 (27.7)	87.4 (30.8)	94.3 (34.6)	101.2 (38.4)	103.0 (39.4)	100.3 (37.9)	97.0 (36.1)	90.1 (32.3)	78.5 (25.8)	69.6 (20.9)	104.0 (40.0)
Mean daily maximum °F (°C)	46.2 (7.9)	50.2 (10.1)	59.5 (15.3)	67.6 (19.8)	77.5 (25.3)	88.4 (31.3)	92.9 (33.8)	89.7 (32.1)	82.6 (28.1)	69.9 (21.1)	56.5 (13.6)	46.5 (8.1)	69.0 (20.5)
Daily mean °F (°C)	32.6 (0.3)	35.7 (2.1)	44.1 (6.7)	52.2 (11.2)	62.3 (16.8)	73.0 (22.8)	77.7 (25.4)	75.3 (24.1)	67.7 (19.8)	54.5 (12.5)	42.3 (5.7)	33.1 (0.6)	54.2 (12.3)
Mean daily minimum °F (°C)	18.9 (−7.3)	21.3 (−5.9)	28.6 (−1.9)	36.7 (2.6)	47.1 (8.4)	57.6 (14.2)	62.5 (16.9)	61.0 (16.1)	52.8 (11.6)	39.2 (4.0)	28.2 (−2.1)	19.8 (−6.8)	39.5 (4.2)
Mean minimum °F (°C)	0.5 (−17.5)	3.7 (−15.7)	10.9 (−11.7)	21.0 (−6.1)	32.6 (0.3)	45.4 (7.4)	53.5 (11.9)	52.2 (11.2)	38.1 (3.4)	22.3 (−5.4)	9.7 (−12.4)	1.0 (−17.2)	−4.8 (−20.4)
Record low °F (°C)	−25 (−32)	−24 (−31)	−6 (−21)	8 (−13)	24 (−4)	38 (3)	45 (7)	41 (5)	20 (−7)	7 (−14)	−9 (−23)	−20 (−29)	−25 (−32)
Average precipitation inches (mm)	0.46 (12)	0.40 (10)	1.06 (27)	1.65 (42)	2.12 (54)	2.60 (66)	3.57 (91)	3.26 (83)	1.43 (36)	1.64 (42)	0.58 (15)	0.76 (19)	19.53 (497)
Average snowfall inches (cm)	4.5 (11)	3.4 (8.6)	4.2 (11)	1.8 (4.6)	0.2 (0.51)	0.0 (0.0)	0.0 (0.0)	0.0 (0.0)	0.0 (0.0)	1.0 (2.5)	2.6 (6.6)	5.3 (13)	23.0 (58)
Average extreme snow depth inches (cm)	4.3 (11)	3.0 (7.6)	3.0 (7.6)	1.7 (4.3)	2.4 (6.1)	0.0 (0.0)	0.0 (0.0)	0.0 (0.0)	0.0 (0.0)	0.8 (2.0)	2.2 (5.6)	4.4 (11)	8.3 (21)
Average precipitation days (≥ 0.01 in)	3.4	3.2	5.3	6.7	8.3	7.6	9.1	8.0	5.1	5.2	3.9	4.2	70.0
Average snowy days (≥ 0.1 in)	2.8	2.2	2.2	0.8	0.1	0.0	0.0	0.0	0.0	0.5	1.4	2.9	12.9
Source 1: NOAA
Source 2: National Weather Service

== Demographics ==
Historical population
Census	Pop.	Note	%±
1930	454		—
1940	406		−10.6%
1950	897		120.9%
1960	856		−4.6%
1970	989		15.5%
1980	884		−10.6%
1990	692		−21.7%
2000	723		4.5%
2010	546		−24.5%
2020	543		−0.5%
U.S. Decennial Census
