= Vilas, Colorado =

Town in Colorado, United States

- Town
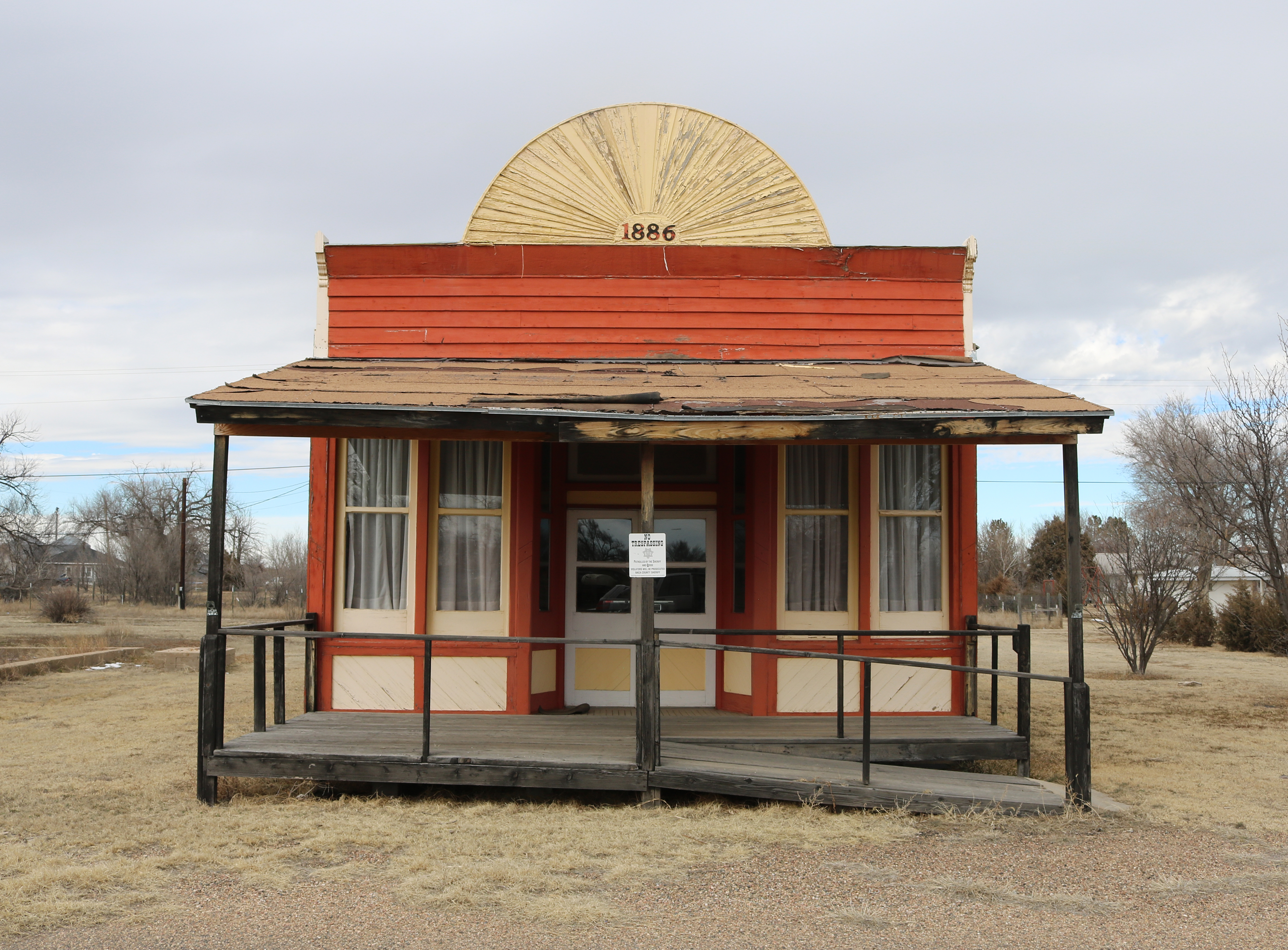
- Former saloon on Main Street (2019)

- Location within Baca County and Colorado
- Coordinates: 37°22′27″N 102°26′51″W
- Country: United States
- State: Colorado
- County: Baca County
- Incorporated: June 25, 1888

Government
  - Type: Statutory Town

Area
  - Total: 0.13 sq mi (0.33 km^{2})
  - Land: 0.13 sq mi (0.33 km^{2})
  - Water: 0 sq mi (0.00 km^{2})
- Elevation: 4,157 ft (1,267 m)

Population (2020)
  - Total: 98
  - Density: 770/sq mi (300/km^{2})
- Time zone: UTC−7 (MST)
  - Summer (DST): UTC−6 (MDT)
- ZIP Code: 81087 (PO Box)
- Area code: 719
- FIPS code: 08-81030
- GNIS ID: 2413433
- Website: Town of Vilas

Vilas is a statutory town in Baca County, Colorado, United States. The population was 98 at the 2020 census.

== History ==
A post office called Vilas has been in operation since 1887.

The community was named after William Freeman Vilas, a United States Senator from Wisconsin.

== Geography ==
Vilas is located in east-central Baca County. U.S. Route 160 passes just to the north of the town, leading west 11 miles (18 km) to Springfield, the county seat, and east 9 miles (14 km) to Walsh.

According to the United States Census Bureau, the town has a total area of 0.1 square miles (0.26 km^{2}), all of it land.

== Demographics ==
Historical population
Census	Pop.	Note	%±
1940	129		—
1950	132		2.3%
1960	107		−18.9%
1970	83		−22.4%
1980	118		42.2%
1990	105		−11.0%
2000	110		4.8%
2010	114		3.6%
2020	98		−14.0%
U.S. Decennial Census
