= Deora, Colorado =

Unincorporated community in Colorado, US

- Unincorporated community
- Location of Deora, Colorado Deora (Colorado)
- Coordinates: 37°34′49″N 102°58′00″W
- Country: United States
- State: Colorado
- County: Baca

Government
  - Type: Unincorporated community
  - Body: Baca County
- Elevation: 4,672 ft (1,424 m)
- Time zone: UTC−07:00 (MST)
  - Summer (DST): UTC−06:00 (MDT)
- ZIP code: 81054 (Las Animas)
- Area code: 719
- GNIS place ID: 196051

Deora is an unincorporated community in Baca County, Colorado, United States.

== History ==
The Deora, Colorado, post office operated from April 21, 1920, until March 1, 1974. The Las Animas, Colorado, post office (ZIP code 81054) now serves Deora postal addresses.

Deora was once a rail siding with a school and store, but little remains today.

=== Early 20th Century ===
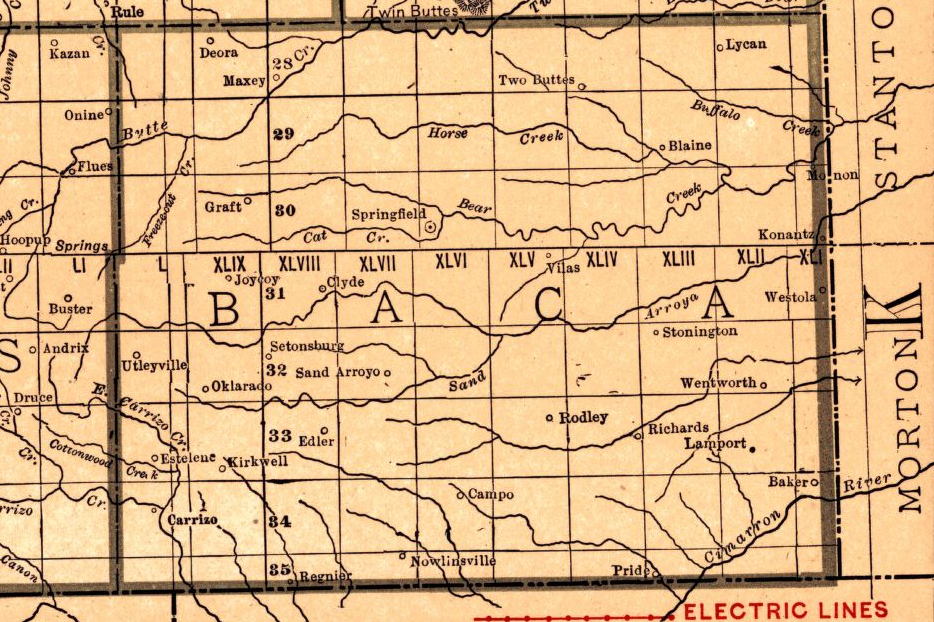
Baca County, Colorado, in 1921, showing the locations of Deora and Maxey in the northwestern part of the county

When a post office was established in 1920, the postmistress suggested naming the settlement de oro, meaning "of gold" in Spanish. Examinations for rural carriers in Stonington and Deora took place in June 1921. The excavation work for what the Springfield Democrat-Herald called a large post office building began in March 1922. Construction began in August.

A graded road between the county seats of Springfield and Las Animas, going through Deora, was completed in September 1923. This was later called a "fine road" in the Democrat-Herald. J.S. Dockum operated the Deora store in the 1920s.

The school in Deora was named Valley View school. In 1927, the teacher assigned to Deora was a student at Colorado State Teachers College.

In 1933, the Big Rock chapter of the 4-H youth club was started in Deora, with 40 members. The chapter still operates, and is the largest 4-H club in the county, although the members now meet in Springfield.

In 1937, the Atchinson, Topeka & Santa Fe Railroad (AT&SF) built a rail line connecting Baca County towns, including Springfield and Campo. A rail siding on the AT&SF called Frick opened 0.7 miles (1.1 km) north of the Deora townsite.

Deora was a small, rural community. In the 1940s, the town of Deora and the Baca County communities of Graft, Edler, and Utleyville were described as "outlets for cream and produce and as centers for the distribution of staple groceries and gasoline." Deora's population remained small, being listed as high as 10, and as low as 4.

=== Later years ===
In the 1950s, Deora still appeared in publications of the Colorado State Planning division, listed alongside Baca communities such as Lycan, Bartlett, and Utleyville. Deora's population was 4 in 1960. The Frick rail station was still operating in 1963.

In 2007, researchers from the University of Colorado Museum of Natural History collected specimens of plants one mile south of Deora. The observers noted Hesperostipa neomexicana (needlegrass), Achnatherum hymenoides (ricegrass), and Chondrosum gracile (grama). These specimens are held by the museum.

Deora gives its name to the Deora quadrangle, a US Geological Survey topographical map.

== Geography ==
Deora is located 23 mi (37 km) northwest of Springfield, the county seat. It is north of the junction of County Road 6 and County Road SS.

== See also ==
- List of populated places in Colorado
- List of post offices in Colorado
