= Colorado State Highway 89 =

State highway in Colorado, United States

State Highway 89
- SH 89 highlighted in red

Route information
- Maintained by CDOT
- Length: 34.340 mi (55.265 km)

Major junctions
- South end: SH 116 at Buckeye Crossroads
- North end: US 50 / US 400 at Holly

Location
- Country: United States
- State: Colorado
- Counties: Baca, Prowers

Highway system
- Colorado State Highway System; Interstate; US; State; Scenic
← SH 88	→ SH 90

State Highway 89 (SH 89) is a 34.340-mile-long (55.265 km) state highway in the rural eastern plains of Colorado. SH 89's southern terminus is at SH 116 at Buckeye Crossroads, and the northern terminus is at U.S. Route 50 (US 50) and US 400 in Holly.

== Route description ==
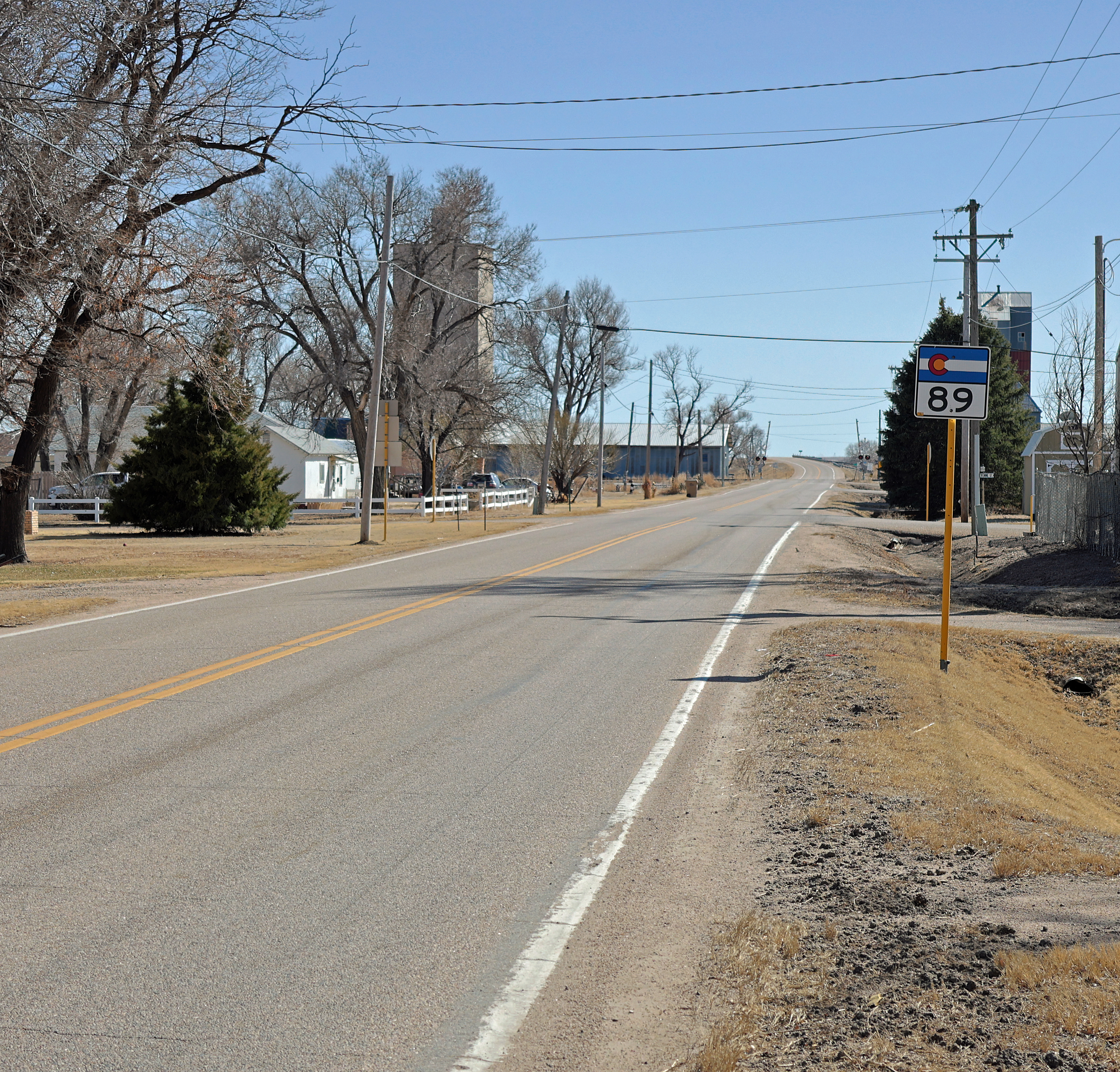
The highway in Holly, Colorado

SH 89 begins in the north at the junction with US 50/400 in Holly and proceeds south out of Holly through rural countryside, isolated from any other towns. Although the highway is the main route from the unincorporated town of Lycan to Holly, there are no major junctions. The highway comes to a stop at the intersection with SH 116 at the small community of Buckeye Crossroads (population: 7). The road continues as an unpaved county road further south after the intersection.

== Major intersections ==
County	Location	mi	km	Destinations	Notes
Baca	Buckeye Crossroads	0.000	0.000	SH 116 – Johnson KS, Two Buttes	Southern terminus
Prowers	Holly	34.340	55.265	US 50 / US 400 – Lamar, Syracuse	Northern terminus
1.000 mi = 1.609 km; 1.000 km = 0.621 mi
