= Utleyville, Colorado =

Unincorporated community in Baca County, CO, USA

- Unincorporated community
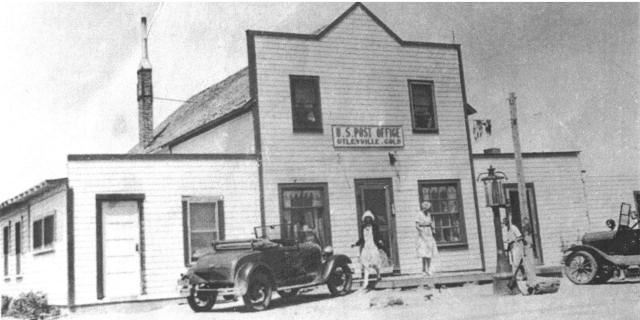
- Utleyville Post Office (1920s)

- Location within Colorado Location within the United States
- Coordinates: 37°16′16″N 103°01′53″W
- Country: United States
- State: Colorado
- County: Baca County
- Elevation: 5,145 ft (1,568 m)
- Time zone: UTC−7 (MST)
  - Summer (DST): UTC−6 (MDT)
- ZIP Code: 81064 (Pritchett)
- Area code: 719
- FIPS code: 08-79985
- GNIS ID: 196210

Utleyville is an unincorporated community in Baca County, Colorado, United States. It is approximately 32 driving miles west-southwest of Springfield.

== History ==
The population of Utleyville was 11 in 1940.

The U.S. Post Office at Pritchett (ZIP Code 81064) now serves Utleyville postal addresses.

== Geography ==
Utleyville is located just south of US Route 160.
