= Buckeye Crossroads, Colorado =

Unincorporated community in Baca County, Colorado, United States

- Unincorporated community
- Location of Buckeye Crossroads, Colorado. Buckeye Crossroads (Colorado)
- Coordinates: 37°23′27″N 102°07′44″W
- Country: United States
- State: Colorado
- County: Baca County

Government
  - Type: unincorporated community
  - Body: Baca County
- Elevation: 3,763 ft (1,147 m)
- Time zone: UTC−07:00 (MST)
  - Summer (DST): UTC−06:00 (MDT)
- Area code: 719
- GNIS pop ID: 203955

Buckeye Crossroads is an unincorporated community in eastern Baca County, Colorado, United States. It is located at the intersection of Colorado State highways 89 and 116. Springfield, Colorado is approximately 37 driving miles east-northeast. Buckeye Crossroads had a population of only 7 in 2000. Buckeye Crossroads never had a post office.

== Geography ==
The community is just over 5 miles from the state border with Kansas.

== See also ==
- List of populated places in Colorado
