= Two Buttes =

Mountain in Colorado, United States

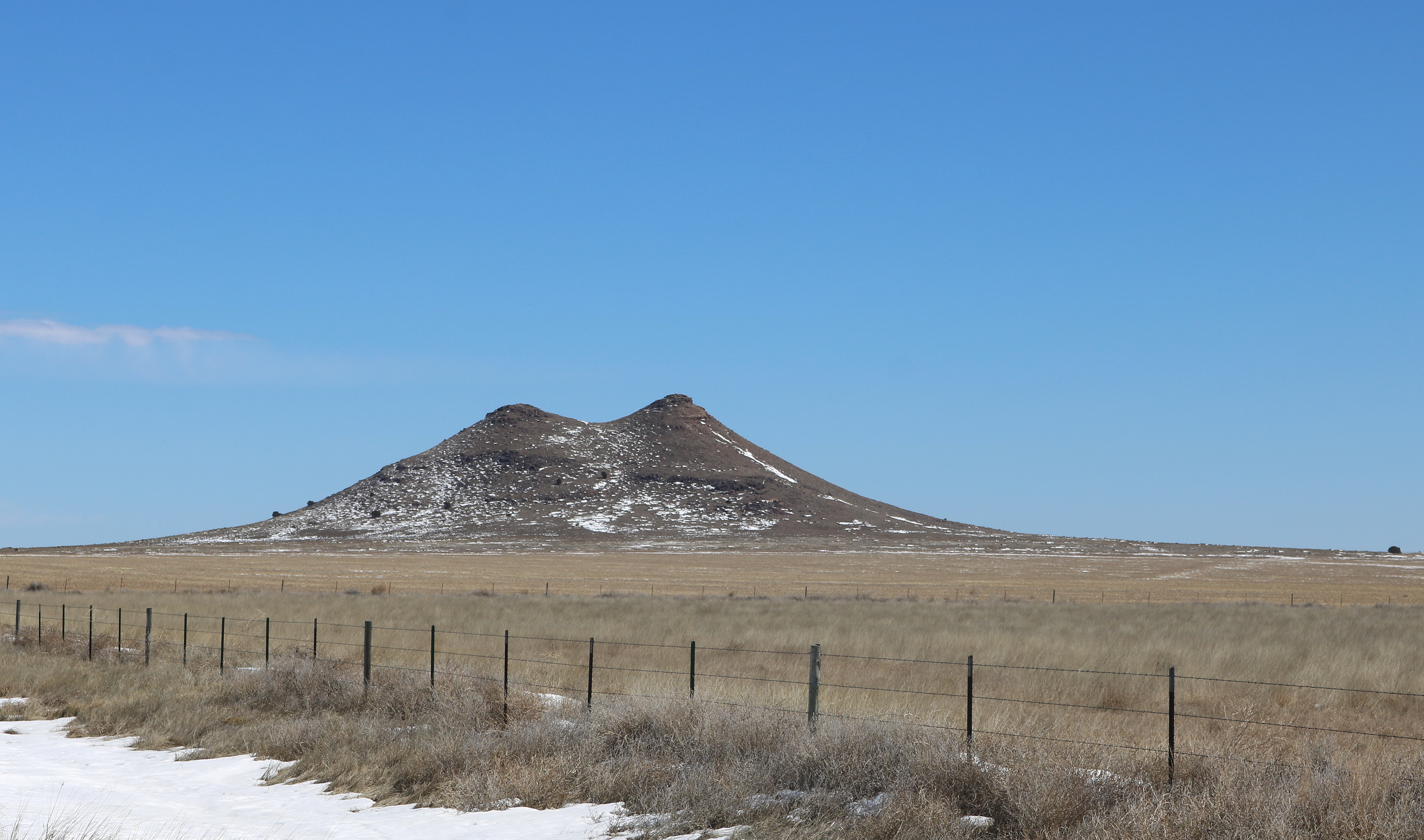
- Two Buttes in 2019

Highest point
- Elevation: 4,701 ft (1,433 m)
- Prominence: 356 ft (109 m)
- Isolation: 16.69 mi (26.86 km)
- Coordinates: 37°39′34″N 102°32′32″W

Geography
- Location within Colorado
- Location: Prowers County, Colorado
- Topo map: Two Buttes Reservoir

Climbing
- Access: Private property

Two Buttes is a dual-peaked mountain in Prowers County, Colorado. The two peaks, which are the highest point in Prowers County, rise about 300 feet (91 m) above the mostly flat Great Plains that surround them, making them visible for miles. The south peak is about 30 feet (9.1 m) higher than the north one, and both are connected by a saddle.

The peaks, on private land, are located just north of the Two Buttes Reservoir State Wildlife Area, located across the border in Baca County just to the south. They are located just east of Highway 385/287. The town of Two Buttes is also located in Baca County, to the south of the peaks.
