= Felipe Baca =

American farmer and politician (1828–1874)

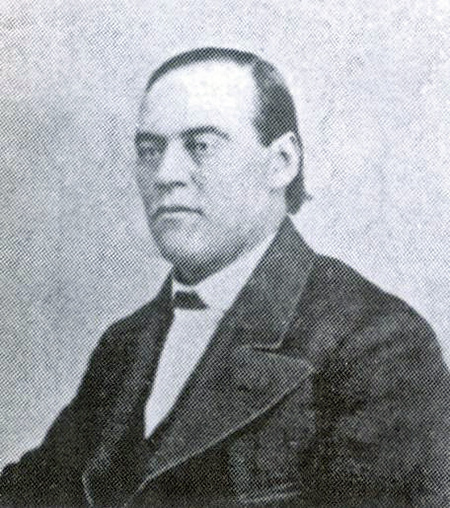
- Born: 1828; Taos, New Mexico
- Died: 1874 (aged 45–46); Trinidad, Colorado, United States
- Occupations: Politician and businessman. Founder of Trinidad.
- Spouse: María Dolores Gonzáles

Luis Felipe de Jesús Baca (1828–1874) was an American farmer, rancher, and politician. He founded the city of Trinidad in the state of Colorado. Baca County, Colorado is named for him.

== Biography ==
He was born in Taos, New Mexico in 1828. During the 29 years that he lived there, he became a prosperous farmer and rancher, dedicated mainly to raising sheep. In his hometown he married María Dolores Gonzáles, with whom he had nine children.

== Founder of Trinidad ==
Baca used to travel to Denver and Santa Fe to sell his produce. In 1860, when he was transporting a shipment of flour, he came across a fertile valley beside the Purgatoire River. Back home, he examined the land's potential for farming and grazing. In the fall of that year, he and his family moved to that valley, reclaiming a portion of the lowlands and waiting for spring to plant their first crops.

Harvesting the first crops (mainly melons and grains), he transported them back to Taos to show his neighbors, who quickly perked up. In 1862, 12 families from Taos made their way through Raton Pass to join the Baca family in the new settlement.

Living in the heart of the town, Baca exercised leadership among all its inhabitants. In 1866, along with William Hoehne, he founded the Trinidad Town Company, the first general store in the area. That same year, the town would have a school and a catholic church, forged on land and with money donated by the Baca family.

== Political career ==
After building Trinidad, he became involved in territorial politics. In 1870, he won a seat as a Republican representative in the territorial legislature, which he held for two years. He was against Colorado statehood, believing that the southern part of the state would be dwarfed by Denver. The Anglo majority in the legislature disagreed, and Colorado became a state in 1876.

== Death ==
He died in 1874 at the age of 46 in the town he founded, Trinidad. His will, which was executed a few days later, noted him as a wealthy man in both possessions and money. The entire fortune was shared among his wife and nine children.

He is buried in the Trinidad Catholic Cemetery.

== Legacy ==
In 1889, the state legislature approved the establishment of a 2,500-square-mile (6,500-square-kilometer) tract of land in the southeast corner of the state as Baca County, in honor of Trinidad's founder.

In 1970, the house he and his wife occupied was listed on the National Register of Historic Places as Baca House and Outbuilding, which has been in operation as a museum since that date. The property was purchased in 1873, a year before his death, in exchange for 22,000 pounds (10,000 kg) of wool.
