= Edler, Colorado =

Unincorporated community in Baca County, Colorado, United States

- Unincorporated community
- Location of Edler, Colorado. Edler (Colorado)
- Coordinates: 37°10′35″N 102°46′42″W
- Country: United States
- State: Colorado
- County: Baca

Government
  - Type: unincorporated community
  - Body: Baca County
- Elevation: 4,652 ft (1,418 m)
- Time zone: UTC−07:00 (MST)
  - Summer (DST): UTC−06:00 (MDT)
- ZIP code: Springfield 81073
- Area code: 719
- GNIS place ID: 196261

Edler is an unincorporated community located in and governed by Baca County, Colorado, United States.

== History ==
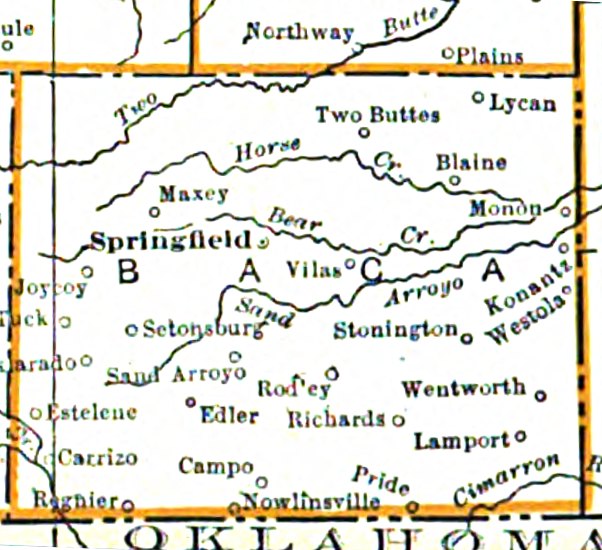
Baca County, Colorado, in 1925, showing the location of Edler

Edler was named for Dr. Edler, one of the first homesteaders in the community.

The Edler, Colorado, post office operated from February 16, 1916, until December 31, 1947. The Springfield, Colorado, post office (ZIP code 81073) now serves the area. Edler was two miles northwest of Holmes City.

In the 1920s, Edler had two mercantiles and a blacksmith shop. The Edler area was noted for its dairy industry, and two cream stations had been established in Edler.

In the 1930s, the community of Edler was the location of several petroleum test sites. In 1936, William A. Arbuthnot organized the Edler Grange. The Edler Grange was #426.

In 1940, Edler's population was 24.

By the 1950s, there was a school and bus barn and the Edler Community Church. Edler's population was 30 in 1960.

By the 1990s, Edler was stated to be "surrounded by sand sagebrush, yucca, blue grama, buffalo grass, side-oats grama, and red threeawn. The population is 25."

== Geography ==
Edler is located within the Comanche National Grassland in southern Baca County. It is located at the junction of County Road P and County Road 17.

== See also ==
- List of populated places in Colorado
- List of post offices in Colorado
