= Springfield Schoolhouse =

- U.S. National Register of Historic Places
- Colorado State Register of Historic Properties
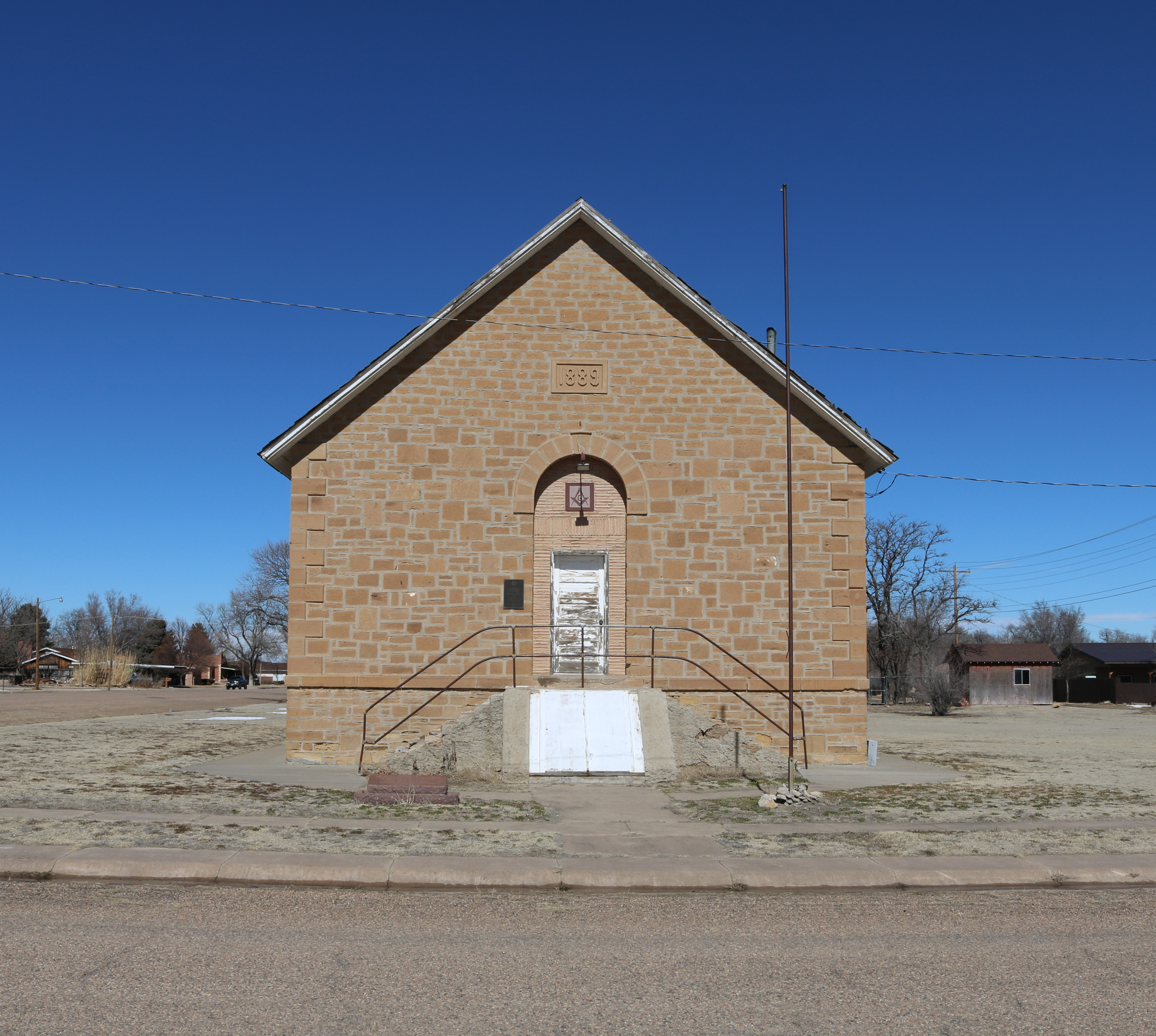
- The Springfield Schoolhouse in 2019.

- Location within Colorado Location within the United States
- Location: 281 W. 7th Ave., Springfield, Colorado
- Coordinates: 37°24′25.58″N 102°37′8.01″W
- Area: less than one acre
- Built: 1889
- MPS: Rural School Buildings in Colorado MPS
- NRHP reference No.: 77000363
- CSRHP No.: 5BA.313
- Added to NRHP: October 5, 1977

The Springfield Schoolhouse, in Springfield, Colorado, is an 1889 rural schoolhouse built with sandstone quarried east of town. It is 53 by 33 feet (16 m × 10 m) in plan. It served as a school until 1920 when it became a Masonic Lodge. It has been known as Springfield Masonic Temple. It originally had a belfrey with school bell, but these elements were lost at some undetermined time.

It was listed on the National Register of Historic Places in 1977, as part of the Rural School Buildings in Colorado Multiple Property Submission.

It was acquired by the Springfield Masonic Temple Association during 1921–25.

The main floor of the building has been used for meetings of Masonic groups, and there is a kitchen and dining area below. By 1976, the stairway down to the lower level had been covered over and was no longer in use.

== See also ==
- National Register of Historic Places listings in Baca County, Colorado
