= Colorado State Highway 116 =

State highway in Colorado, United States

State Highway 116
- SH 116 highlighted in red

Route information
- Maintained by CDOT
- Length: 32.2 mi (51.8 km)

Major junctions
- West end: US 287 / US 385 near Springfield
- SH 89 at Buckeye Crossroads
- East end: W Road 12 at Kansas state line

Location
- Country: United States
- State: Colorado
- Counties: Baca

Highway system
- Colorado State Highway System; Interstate; US; State; Scenic
← SH 115	→ SH 119

State Highway 116 (SH 116) is a fairly isolated state highway in Colorado that runs from the Kansas state line in the south eastern corner of the state. SH 116's western terminus is at U.S. Route 287 (US 287) and US 385 near Springfield, and the eastern terminus is at W Road 12 at the Kansas state line.

== Route description ==
The highway gives service though the very rural country in Baca County through Two Buttes to the junction with US 287 and US 385 about 7 miles north of Springfield. The highway's maintenance is served by Two Buttes, the only town on its route. The town is the largest town for many miles in any direction.

== Major intersections ==
The entire route is in Baca County.

Location	mi	km	Destinations	Notes
	0.000	0.000	US 287 / US 385 – Springfield, Lamar	Western terminus
	27.020	43.484	SH 89 north – Holly	Southern terminus of SH 89
	32.322	52.017	W Road 12 – Johnson City	Continuation beyond Kansas state line
1.000 mi = 1.609 km; 1.000 km = 0.621 mi

== See also ==
- List of state highways in Colorado
