= Pritchett, Colorado =

Town in Colorado, United States

- Town
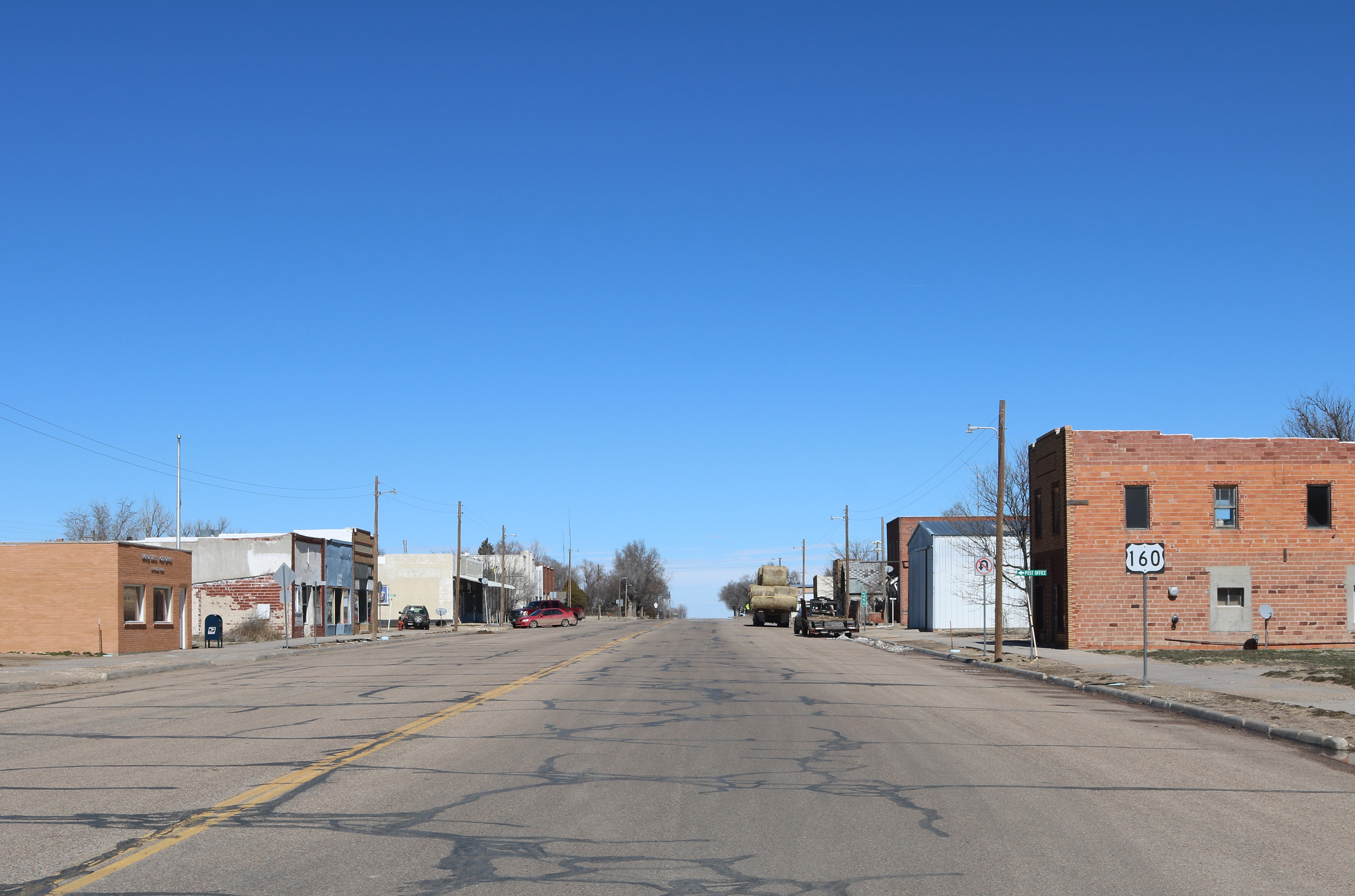
- Looking north along Randolph Street (2019)

- Location within Baca County and Colorado
- Coordinates: 37°22′12″N 102°51′32″W
- Country: United States
- State: Colorado
- County: Baca
- Incorporated: 1923

Government
  - Type: Statutory Town

Area
  - Total: 0.23 sq mi (0.60 km^{2})
  - Land: 0.23 sq mi (0.60 km^{2})
  - Water: 0 sq mi (0.00 km^{2})
- Elevation: 4,826 ft (1,471 m)

Population (2020)
  - Total: 112
  - Density: 480/sq mi (190/km^{2})
- Time zone: UTC−7 (MST)
  - Summer (DST): UTC−6 (MDT)
- ZIP Code: 81064
- Area code: 719
- GNIS ID: 2412509
- FIPS code: 08-61315
- Website: Town of Pritchett

Pritchett is a statutory town in Baca County, Colorado, United States. The population was 112 at the 2020 census.

== History ==
A post office called Pritchett has been in operation since 1927. The community was named after Henry S. Pritchett, a railroad official.

== Geography ==
Pritchett is located in western Baca County. U.S. Route 160 passes through the town, leading east 16 miles (26 km) to Springfield, the county seat, and west 106 miles (171 km) to Trinidad.

According to the United States Census Bureau, the town has a total area of 0.2 square miles (0.52 km^{2}), all of it land.

== Demographics ==
Historical population
Census	Pop.	Note	%±
1930	451		—
1940	495		9.8%
1950	286		−42.2%
1960	247		−13.6%
1970	170		−31.2%
1980	183		7.6%
1990	153		−16.4%
2000	137		−10.5%
2010	140		2.2%
2020	112		−20.0%
U.S. Decennial Census

== Popular culture ==
The film The Hi-Lo Country, a 1998 drama/western film directed by Stephen Frears was filmed in part in the town of Pritchett.

== See also ==
- Baca County, Colorado
