= Campo, Colorado =

Statutory town in Baca County, Colorado, USA

- Statutory town
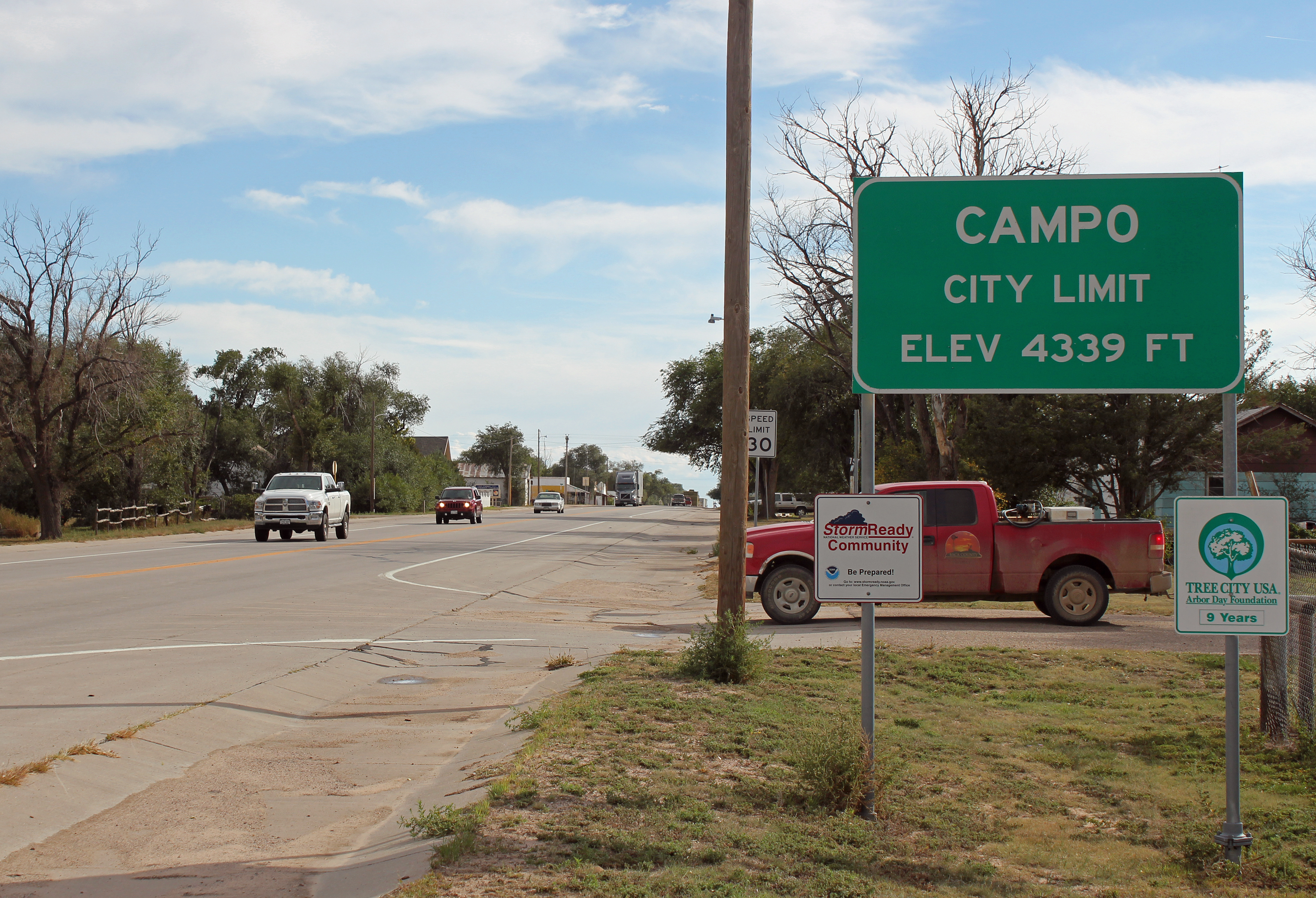
- Entering Campo from the north on U.S. Route 287/385 (2015)

- Location within Baca County and Colorado
- Coordinates: 37°06′17″N 102°34′44″W
- Country: United States
- State: Colorado
- County: Baca
- Incorporated: March 6, 1950

Government
  - Type: statutory town

Area
  - Total: 0.144 sq mi (0.374 km^{2})
  - Land: 0.144 sq mi (0.374 km^{2})
  - Water: 0 sq mi (0.000 km^{2})
- Elevation: 4,344 ft (1,324 m)

Population (2020)
  - Total: 103
  - Density: 713/sq mi (275/km^{2})
- Time zone: UTC−07:00 (MST)
  - Summer (DST): UTC−06:00 (MDT)
- ZIP code: 81029
- Area code: 719
- GNIS town ID: 2413155
- FIPS code: 08-11645
- Website: Town Website

Campo is a statutory town located in Baca County, Colorado, United States. The town population was 103 at the 2020 United States census. The town is situated on the High Plains, straddling U.S. Route 287/385.

== History ==
Campo is a name derived from a Spanish word meaning "field". The Campo, Colorado, post office opened on April 10, 1913, and the town grew around it.

== Geography ==
Campo is located just north of the Oklahoma border in southern Baca County. Via U.S. Route 287/385 it is 21 miles (34 km) north to Springfield, the county seat, and 27 miles (43 km) south to Boise City, Oklahoma.

At the 2020 United States census, the town had a total area of 92 acres (0.374 km^{2}), all of it land.

Picture Canyon, in the Comanche National Grassland, is to the southwest. The canyon includes scenic vistas, unique rock formations, rolling hills, and rock art from Plains Indian cultures.

== Climate ==
According to the Köppen Climate Classification system, Campo has a cold semi-arid climate, abbreviated "BSk" on climate maps. The hottest temperature recorded in Campo was 110 °F (43.3 °C) on July 31, 1987, while the coldest temperature recorded was −26 °F (−32.2 °C) on December 21, 1983 and February 3, 1996.

Climate data for Campo, Colorado, 1991–2020 normals, extremes 1970–present
| Month | Jan | Feb | Mar | Apr | May | Jun | Jul | Aug | Sep | Oct | Nov | Dec | Year |
|---|---|---|---|---|---|---|---|---|---|---|---|---|---|
| Record high °F (°C) | 82 (28) | 85 (29) | 99 (37) | 98 (37) | 102 (39) | 109 (43) | 110 (43) | 106 (41) | 106 (41) | 98 (37) | 88 (31) | 81 (27) | 110 (43) |
| Mean maximum °F (°C) | 71.7 (22.1) | 75.3 (24.1) | 83.4 (28.6) | 88.1 (31.2) | 94.7 (34.8) | 101.0 (38.3) | 102.8 (39.3) | 99.9 (37.7) | 97.0 (36.1) | 91.2 (32.9) | 80.8 (27.1) | 72.1 (22.3) | 104.0 (40.0) |
| Mean daily maximum °F (°C) | 49.1 (9.5) | 52.4 (11.3) | 60.9 (16.1) | 68.9 (20.5) | 77.8 (25.4) | 88.1 (31.2) | 92.1 (33.4) | 89.2 (31.8) | 82.8 (28.2) | 71.0 (21.7) | 58.6 (14.8) | 49.2 (9.6) | 70.0 (21.1) |
| Daily mean °F (°C) | 33.9 (1.1) | 36.6 (2.6) | 44.4 (6.9) | 52.5 (11.4) | 62.2 (16.8) | 72.3 (22.4) | 77.0 (25.0) | 74.7 (23.7) | 66.8 (19.3) | 54.5 (12.5) | 42.9 (6.1) | 34.3 (1.3) | 54.3 (12.4) |
| Mean daily minimum °F (°C) | 18.7 (−7.4) | 20.9 (−6.2) | 28.0 (−2.2) | 36.1 (2.3) | 46.6 (8.1) | 56.5 (13.6) | 61.9 (16.6) | 60.2 (15.7) | 50.8 (10.4) | 38.0 (3.3) | 27.2 (−2.7) | 19.3 (−7.1) | 38.7 (3.7) |
| Mean minimum °F (°C) | 1.8 (−16.8) | 6.0 (−14.4) | 12.2 (−11.0) | 22.0 (−5.6) | 33.1 (0.6) | 45.3 (7.4) | 53.3 (11.8) | 51.8 (11.0) | 37.7 (3.2) | 22.0 (−5.6) | 12.0 (−11.1) | 4.4 (−15.3) | 1.4 (−17.0) |
| Record low °F (°C) | −22 (−30) | −26 (−32) | 2 (−17) | 10 (−12) | 24 (−4) | 35 (2) | 47 (8) | 42 (6) | 27 (−3) | 9 (−13) | −5 (−21) | −26 (−32) | −26 (−32) |
| Average precipitation inches (mm) | 0.34 (8.6) | 0.32 (8.1) | 0.82 (21) | 1.35 (34) | 1.82 (46) | 2.01 (51) | 2.93 (74) | 3.33 (85) | 1.41 (36) | 1.32 (34) | 0.44 (11) | 0.52 (13) | 16.61 (421.7) |
| Average snowfall inches (cm) | 4.3 (11) | 2.6 (6.6) | 3.9 (9.9) | 1.8 (4.6) | 0.0 (0.0) | 0.0 (0.0) | 0.0 (0.0) | 0.0 (0.0) | 0.0 (0.0) | 1.6 (4.1) | 3.4 (8.6) | 7.3 (19) | 24.9 (63.8) |
| Average precipitation days (≥ 0.01 in) | 3.0 | 2.9 | 4.3 | 5.4 | 7.2 | 6.9 | 8.3 | 8.0 | 4.5 | 4.1 | 3.1 | 3.5 | 61.2 |
| Average snowy days (≥ 0.1 in) | 2.0 | 1.7 | 1.5 | 0.8 | 0.0 | 0.0 | 0.0 | 0.0 | 0.0 | 0.4 | 1.2 | 2.5 | 10.1 |
Source 1: NOAA
Source 2: xmACIS2

== Demographics ==
Historical population
| Census | Pop. | Note | %± |
|---|---|---|---|
| 1950 | 266 | | — |
| 1960 | 235 | | −11.7% |
| 1970 | 206 | | −12.3% |
| 1980 | 185 | | −10.2% |
| 1990 | 121 | | −34.6% |
| 2000 | 150 | | 24.0% |
| 2010 | 109 | | −27.3% |
| 2020 | 103 | | −5.5% |
U.S. Decennial Census

As of the census of 2000, there were 150 people, 55 households, and 44 families residing in the town. The population density was 1,086.4 inhabitants per square mile (419.5/km^{2}). There were 79 housing units at an average density of 572.2 per square mile (220.9/km^{2}). The racial makeup of the town was 95.33% White, 3.33% Native American, and 1.33% from two or more races. Hispanic or Latino of any race were 4.67% of the population.

There were 55 households, out of which 40.0% had children under the age of 18 living with them, 70.9% were married couples living together, 5.5% had a female householder with no husband present, and 20.0% were non-families. 18.2% of all households were made up of individuals, and 10.9% had someone living alone who was 65 years of age or older. The average household size was 2.73 and the average family size was 3.11.

In the town, the population was spread out, with 30.7% under the age of 18, 4.7% from 18 to 24, 25.3% from 25 to 44, 22.7% from 45 to 64, and 16.7% who were 65 years of age or older. The median age was 38 years. For every 100 females, there were 105.5 males. For every 100 females age 18 and over, there were 92.6 males.

The median income for a household in the town was $20,875, and the median income for a family was $21,375. Males had a median income of $19,167 versus $19,375 for females. The per capita income for the town was $7,818. There were 33.3% of families and 45.6% of the population living below the poverty line, including 73.2% of under eighteens and 8.3% of those over 64.

== See also ==
- List of municipalities in Colorado
