= Springfield Municipal Airport (Colorado) =

Airport in Colorado, United States

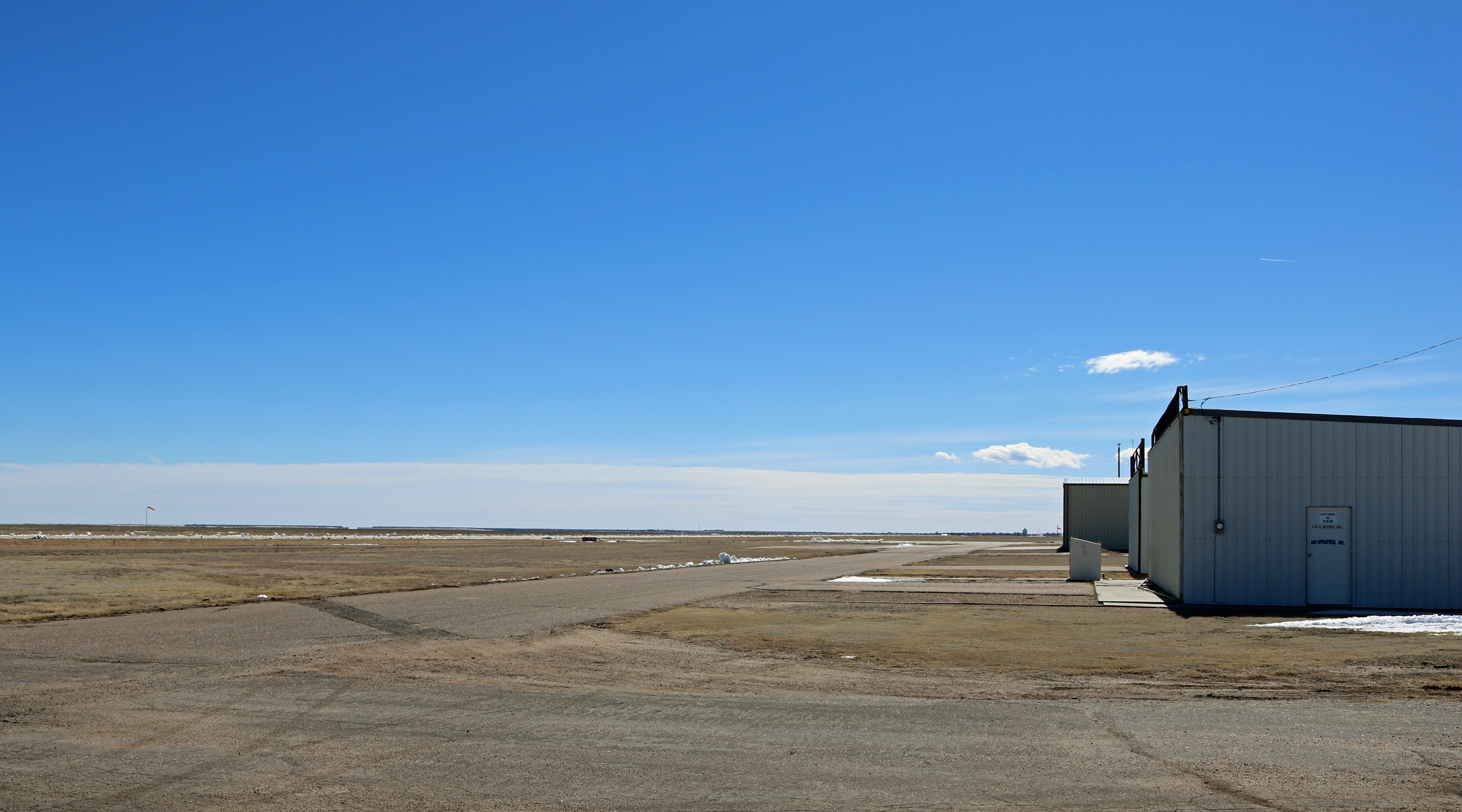
- The airport in 2019
- IATA: none; ICAO: KSPD; FAA LID: 8V7

Summary
- Airport type: Public
- Owner: Town of Springfield
- Serves: Springfield, Colorado
- Elevation AMSL: 4,390 ft / 1,338 m
- Coordinates: 37°27′31″N 102°37′05″W
- Website: Official website

Map
- Location of airport in Colorado

Runways
Direction	Length		Surface
Direction	ft	m	Surface
17/35	5,000	1,524	Concrete

Statistics (2015)
- Aircraft operations: 3,250
- Based aircraft: 10
- Source: Federal Aviation Administration

Springfield Municipal Airport (ICAO: KSPD, FAA LID: 8V7) is a town owned, public use airport located four nautical miles (5 mi, 7 km) north of the central business district of Springfield, a town in Baca County, Colorado, United States.

== Facilities and aircraft ==
Springfield Municipal Airport covers an area of 40 acres (16 ha) at an elevation of 4,390 feet (1,338 m) above mean sea level. It has one runway designated 17/35 with a concrete surface measuring 5,000 by 60 feet (1,524 x 18 m).

For the 12-month period ending December 31, 2015, the airport had 3,250 general aviation aircraft operations, an average of 62 per week. At that time there were 10 aircraft single-engine based at this airport.

== See also ==
- List of airports in Colorado
