= Lycan, Colorado =

Unincorporated community in Baca County, CO, USA

- Unincorporated community
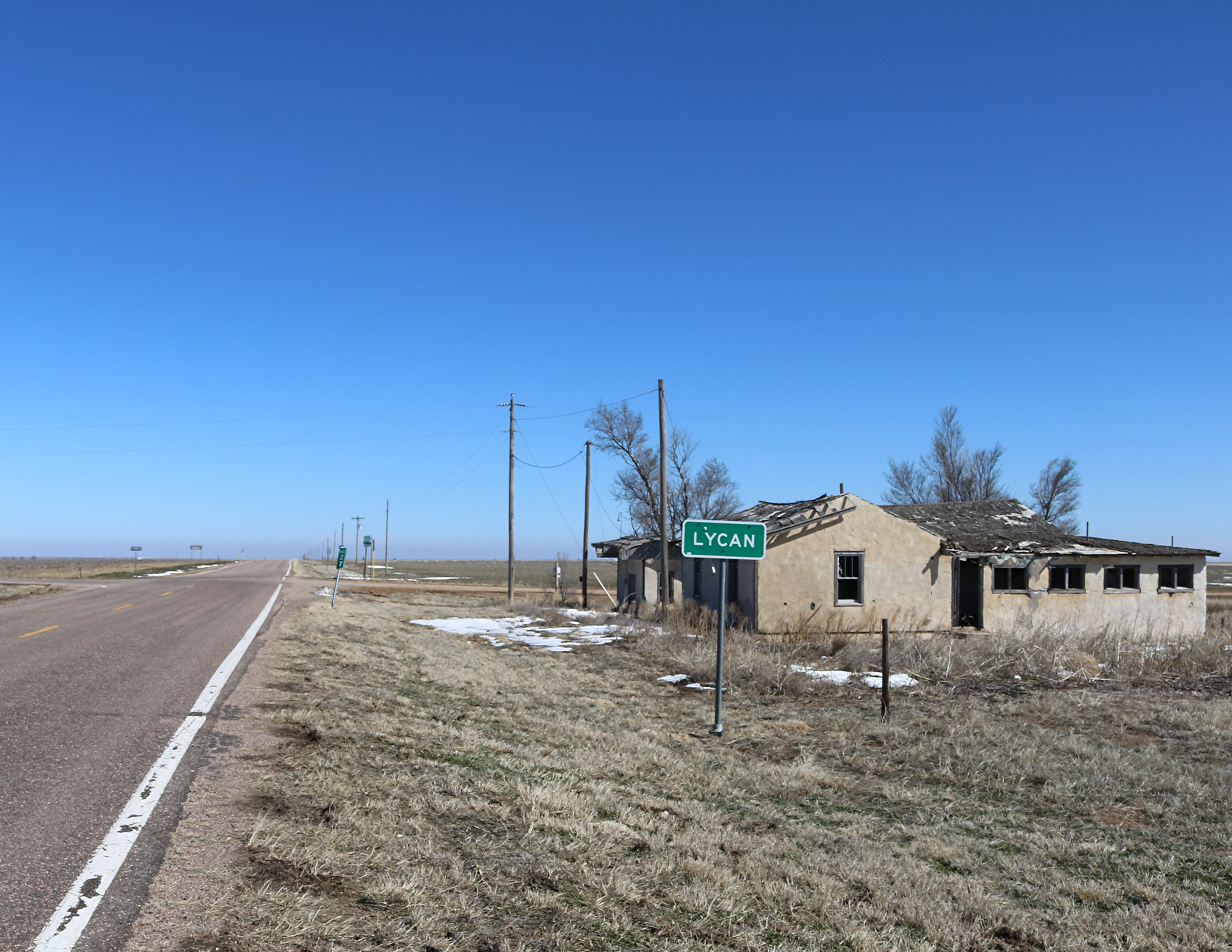
- Looking east along State Highway 116 in Lycan

- Location within Colorado Location within the United States
- Coordinates: 37°36′55″N 102°12′03″W
- Country: United States
- State: Colorado
- County: Baca
- Elevation: 3,862 ft (1,177 m)
- Time zone: UTC−7 (MST)
  - Summer (DST): UTC−6 (MDT)
- ZIP Code: 81084 (Two Buttes)
- Area code: 719
- FIPS code: 08-46960
- GNIS ID: 196066

Lycan is an unincorporated community in Baca County, Colorado, United States. It is located approximately 37 driving miles east-northeast of Springfield. Lycan has also been called Buckeye and Buckeye Crossroads. The community was probably named "Lycan" after the name of its female postmaster.

== History ==
The Lycan postoffice was open from 1913 to 1975. The U.S. Post Office at Two Buttes (ZIP Code 81084) now serves Lycan postal addresses.

== Geography ==
Lycan is located at the junction of Colorado highways 89 and 116. The community is just over five miles from the state border with Kansas.
