= Stonington, Colorado =

Unincorporated community in Baca County, CO, USA

- Unincorporated community
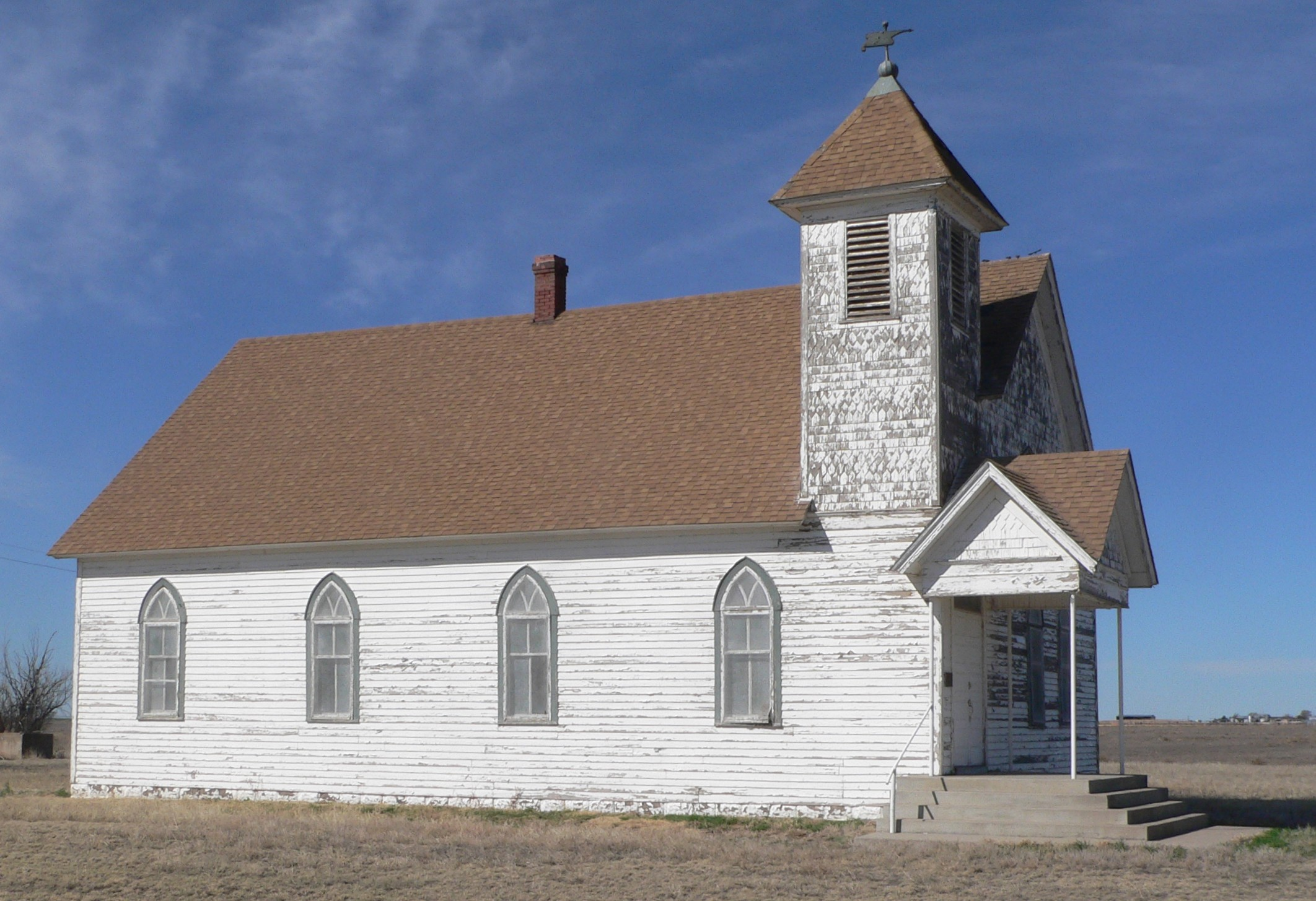
- Methodist Church in Stonington (2015)

- Location within Colorado Location within the United States
- Coordinates: 37°17′37.07″N 102°11′14.65″W
- Country: United States
- State: Colorado
- County: Baca County
- Elevation: 3,809 ft (1,161 m)
- Time zone: UTC−7 (MST)
  - Summer (DST): UTC−6 (MDT)
- ZIP Code: 81090
- Area code: 719
- FIPS code: 08-74320
- GNIS ID: 196221

Stonington is an unincorporated community in eastern Baca County, Colorado, United States. Stonington lies east of the Comanche National Grassland and is the southeasternmost community in Colorado.

== History ==
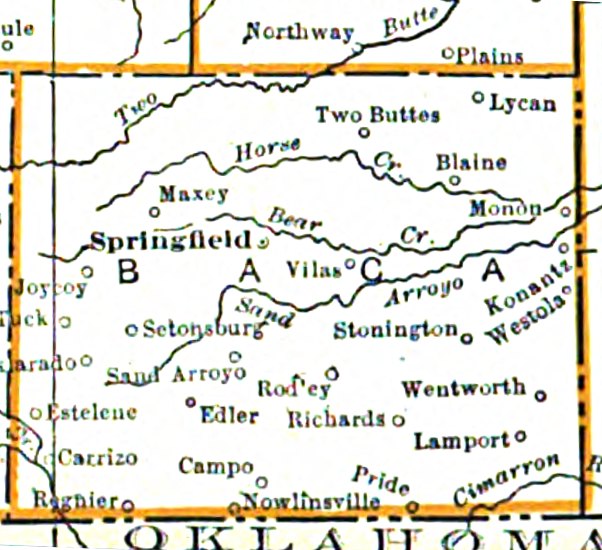
Baca County, Colorado, in 1925, showing the location of Stonington

The Stonington post office operated from 1888 until 1992. Stonington addresses are now served by the Walsh post office with the ZIP code 81090.

In 1940, Stonington's population was 65.

On May 17, 1962, an F1 tornado hit Stonington, destroying several farms.

== Climate ==
According to the Köppen Climate Classification system, Stonington has a semi-arid climate, abbreviated "BSk" on climate maps.

== See also ==
- List of places in Colorado
