= Two Buttes, Colorado =

Town in Colorado, United States

- Town
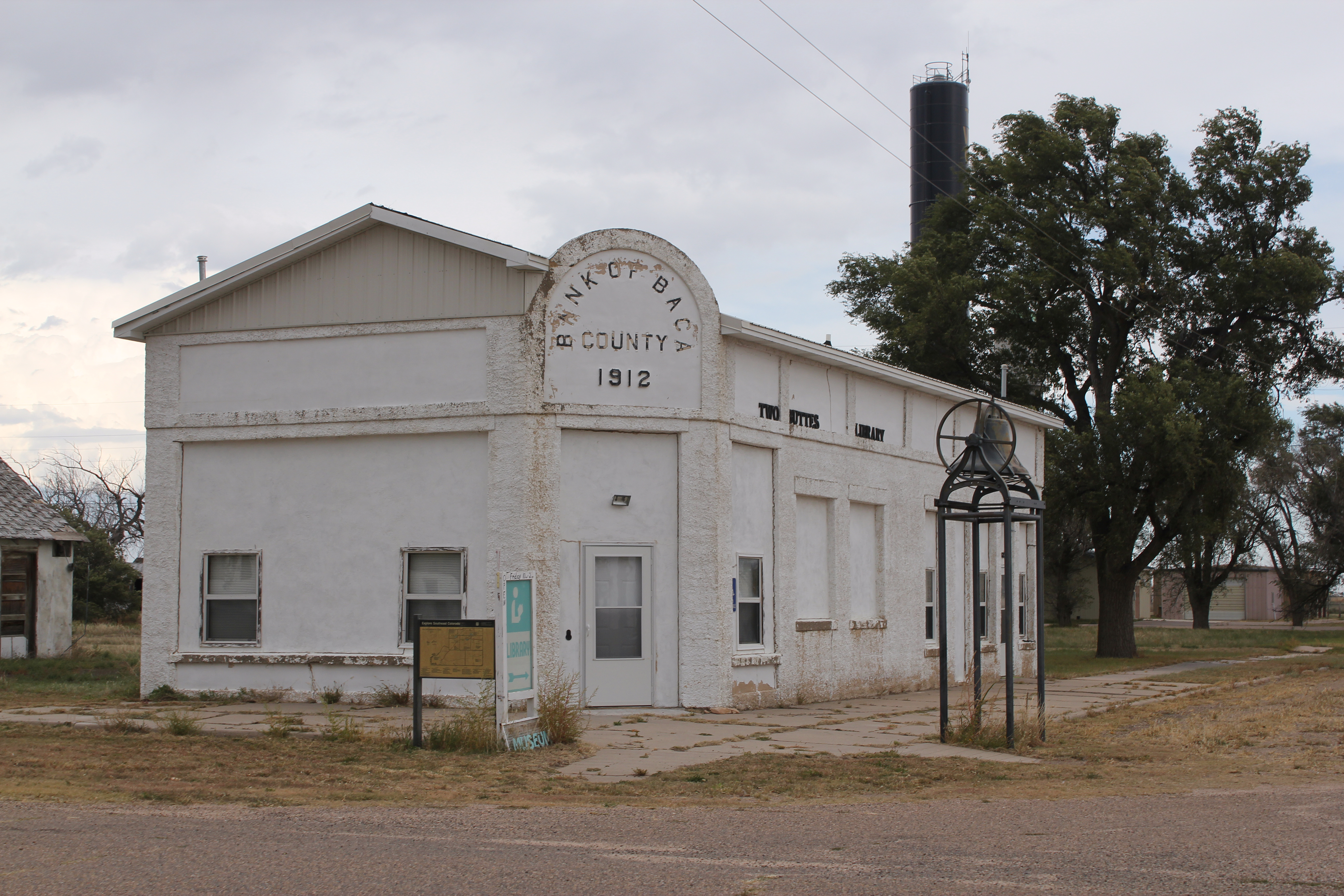
- Two Buttes Library (2015)

- Location within Baca County and Colorado
- Coordinates: 37°33′38″N 102°23′47″W
- Country: United States
- State: Colorado
- County: Baca County
- Incorporated: Oct 19, 1911

Government
  - Type: Statutory Town

Area
  - Total: 0.25 sq mi (0.64 km^{2})
  - Land: 0.25 sq mi (0.64 km^{2})
  - Water: 0 sq mi (0.00 km^{2})
- Elevation: 4,105 ft (1,251 m)

Population (2020)
  - Total: 34
  - Density: 140/sq mi (53/km^{2})
- Time zone: UTC−7 (MST)
  - Summer (DST): UTC−6 (MDT)
- ZIP Code: 81084
- Area code: 719
- FIPS code: 08-79270
- GNIS ID: 2413409
- Website: Town of Two Buttes

Two Buttes is a statutory town located in Baca County, Colorado, United States. The population was 34 at the 2020 census.

== Geography ==
Two Buttes is located in northeast Baca County. The hill known as Two Buttes is 8 miles (13 km) to the northwest of the town, overlooking Two Buttes Reservoir on Two Butte Creek, a tributary of the Arkansas River.

The town of Two Buttes is on State Highway 116 and is 23 miles (37 km) by road northeast of Springfield, the Baca County seat. East on Highway 116 it is 20 miles (32 km) to the Kansas border.

According to the United States Census Bureau, the town has a total area of 0.2 square miles (0.52 km^{2}), all of it land.

=== Climate ===
The Köppen Climate system classifies the weather as semi-arid, abbreviated as BSk.

Climate data for Two Buttes, Colorado
Month	Jan	Feb	Mar	Apr	May	Jun	Jul	Aug	Sep	Oct	Nov	Dec	Year
Mean daily maximum °C (°F)	8 (46)	10 (50)	14 (58)	20 (68)	26 (79)	33 (91)	40 (104)	33 (91)	28 (83)	22 (72)	14 (57)	9 (48)	21 (69)
Mean daily minimum °C (°F)	−9 (16)	−7 (20)	−3 (26)	2 (36)	8 (46)	13 (56)	17 (62)	16 (60)	11 (51)	4 (39)	−3 (26)	−7 (19)	3 (38)
Average precipitation mm (inches)	7.6 (0.3)	10 (0.4)	20 (0.8)	33 (1.3)	56 (2.2)	58 (2.3)	51 (2)	46 (1.8)	30 (1.2)	20 (0.8)	13 (0.5)	10 (0.4)	350 (13.9)
Source: Weatherbase

== Demographics ==
Historical population
Census	Pop.	Note	%±
1920	93		—
1930	158		69.9%
1940	158		0.0%
1950	121		−23.4%
1960	111		−8.3%
1970	138		24.3%
1980	84		−39.1%
1990	63		−25.0%
2000	67		6.3%
2010	43		−35.8%
2020	34		−20.9%
U.S. Decennial Census

== Notable people ==
- Clare Dunn, (b. 1987), country music artist

== See also ==
Memoir, An Owl on Every Post, by Sanora Babb: description of Two Buttes in 1913 from homesteader perspective.
