= Baca County, Colorado =

County in Colorado, United States

- County
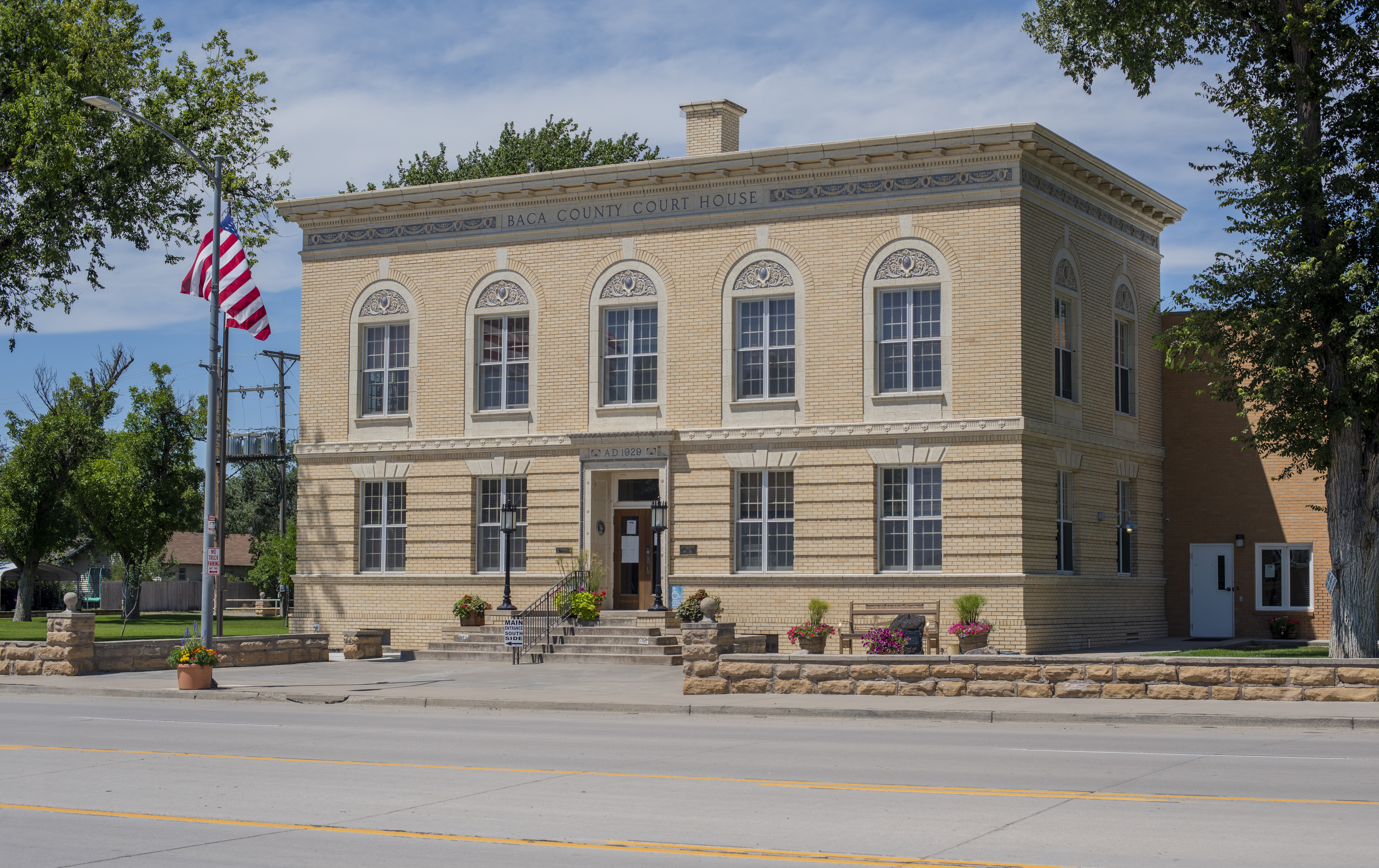
- The Baca County Courthouse in Springfield.

- Location within the U.S. state of Colorado
- Coordinates: 37.32°N 102.56°W
- Country: United States
- State: Colorado
- Founded: April 16, 1889
- Named for: Felipe Baca
- Seat: Springfield
- Largest town: Springfield

Area
  - Total: 2,557 sq mi (6,620 km^{2})
  - Land: 2,555 sq mi (6,620 km^{2})
  - Water: 2.4 sq mi (6.2 km^{2}) 0.09%

Population (2020)
  - Total: 3,506
  - Estimate (2025): 3,347 ▼
  - Density: 1.372/sq mi (0.5298/km^{2})
- Time zone: UTC−7 (Mountain)
  - Summer (DST): UTC−6 (MDT)
- Congressional district: 4th
- Website: bacacountyco.gov

Baca County is a county located in the U.S. state of Colorado. As of the 2020 census, the population was 3,506. The county seat is Springfield. Located at the southeast corner of Colorado, the county shares state borders with Kansas, New Mexico, and Oklahoma.

== History ==
Baca County was created by the Colorado legislature on April 16, 1889, out of eastern portions of Las Animas County. Baca County was named in honor of pioneer and Colorado territorial legislator Felipe Baca.

Prior to the 1880s there was little activity in the county, other than along the Cutoff Branch of the Santa Fe Trail that crosses its extreme southeastern corner. The 1910s saw wet years and expansion due to the increase in acreage that could be homesteaded. World War I also brought increased demand for agricultural products. The arrival of the Santa Fe Railroad in 1926 created new towns and a population increase.

The Dust Bowl arrived in the 1930s, with Baca County being one of the hardest hit areas. This prompted soil conservation efforts by the federal government. Part of this effort was the purchase of cultivated land by the government in order to return it to grassland. Today the U.S. Forest Service supervises 220,000 acres of Comanche National Grassland which was purchased in the 1930s. These areas include East and West Carrizo Creeks and Picture Canyon. Colorado Parks and Wildlife maintains the recreational areas at Two Buttes Lake and Turk's Pond.

On May 18, 1977, an F4 tornado struck the southeastern portion of Baca County, causing an estimated $2.5 million in damage. It tracked from Keyes, Oklahoma, where damage was estimated at $25,000. As of 2020, this is the only F4/EF4 tornado ever recorded in Colorado since 1950.

== Geography ==
According to the U.S. Census Bureau, the county has a total area of 2,557 square miles (6,620 km^{2}), of which 2,555 square miles (6,620 km^{2}) is land and 2.4 square miles (6.2 km^{2}) (0.09%) is water.

=== Adjacent counties ===
- Prowers County, Colorado (north)
- Stanton County, Kansas (east/Central Time border)
- Morton County, Kansas (east/Central Time border)
- Cimarron County, Oklahoma (south/Central Time border)
- Union County, New Mexico (southwest)
- Las Animas County, Colorado (west)
- Bent County, Colorado (northwest)

=== Major highways ===
- U.S. Highway 160
- U.S. Highway 385
- State Highway 116
- CR M (East of US 385 to the Kansas border)

=== National historic trail ===
- Santa Fe National Historic Trail

== Demographics ==
Historical population
Census	Pop.	Note	%±
1890	1,479		—
1900	759		−48.7%
1910	2,516		231.5%
1920	8,721		246.6%
1930	10,570		21.2%
1940	6,207		−41.3%
1950	7,964		28.3%
1960	6,310		−20.8%
1970	5,674		−10.1%
1980	5,419		−4.5%
1990	4,556		−15.9%
2000	4,517		−0.9%
2010	3,788		−16.1%
2020	3,506		−7.4%
2025 (est.)	3,347	▼	−4.5%
U.S. Decennial Census; 1790-1960 1900-1990; 1990-2000 2010-2020

=== 2020 census ===
As of the 2020 census, the county had a population of 3,506. Of the residents, 21.5% were under the age of 18 and 25.4% were 65 years of age or older; the median age was 45.5 years. For every 100 females there were 104.2 males, and for every 100 females age 18 and over there were 102.3 males. 0.0% of residents lived in urban areas and 100.0% lived in rural areas.

Baca County, Colorado – Racial and ethnic composition Note: the US Census treats Hispanic/Latino as an ethnic category. This table excludes Latinos from the racial categories and assigns them to a separate category. Hispanics/Latinos may be of any race.
Race / Ethnicity (NH = Non-Hispanic)	Pop 2000	Pop 2010	Pop 2020	% 2000	% 2010	% 2020
White alone (NH)	4,084	3,323	2,916	90.41%	87.72%	83.17%
Black or African American alone (NH)	1	20	19	0.02%	0.53%	0.54%
Native American or Alaska Native alone (NH)	46	39	38	1.02%	1.03%	1.08%
Asian alone (NH)	7	6	8	0.15%	0.16%	0.23%
Pacific Islander alone (NH)	4	0	0	0.09%	0.00%	0.00%
Other race alone (NH)	0	6	37	0.00%	0.16%	1.06%
Mixed race or Multiracial (NH)	58	46	142	1.28%	1.21%	4.05%
Hispanic or Latino (any race)	317	348	346	7.02%	9.19%	9.87%
Total	4,517	3,788	3,506	100.00%	100.00%	100.00%

The racial makeup of the county was 86.8% White, 0.7% Black or African American, 1.2% American Indian and Alaska Native, 0.4% Asian, 0.0% Native Hawaiian and Pacific Islander, 4.3% from some other race, and 6.6% from two or more races. Hispanic or Latino residents of any race comprised 9.9% of the population.

There were 1,575 households in the county, of which 26.1% had children under the age of 18 living with them and 25.4% had a female householder with no spouse or partner present. About 35.5% of all households were made up of individuals and 17.5% had someone living alone who was 65 years of age or older.

There were 1,972 housing units, of which 20.1% were vacant. Among occupied housing units, 70.5% were owner-occupied and 29.5% were renter-occupied. The homeowner vacancy rate was 2.9% and the rental vacancy rate was 9.6%.

=== 2000 census ===
As of the 2000 census, there were 4,517 people, 1,905 households, and 1,268 families residing in the county. The population density was 2 people per square mile (0.77 people/km^{2}). There were 2,364 housing units at an average density of 1 per square mile (0.39/km^{2}). The racial makeup of the county was 93.73% White, 0.04% Black or African American, 1.20% Native American, 0.15% Asian, 0.09% Pacific Islander, 2.99% from other races, and 1.79% from two or more races. 7.02% of the population were Hispanic or Latino of any race.

There were 1,905 households, out of which 28.40% had children under the age of 18 living with them, 56.80% were married couples living together, 7.50% had a female householder with no husband present, and 33.40% were non-families. 30.40% of all households were made up of individuals, and 15.70% had someone living alone who was 65 years of age or older. The average household size was 2.33 and the average family size was 2.90.

In the county, the population was spread out, with 24.50% under the age of 18, 5.90% from 18 to 24, 22.70% from 25 to 44, 24.50% from 45 to 64, and 22.40% who were 65 years of age or older. The median age was 43 years. For every 100 females, there were 99.00 males. For every 100 females age 18 and over, there were 95.50 males.

The median income for a household in the county was $28,099, and the median income for a family was $34,018. Males had a median income of $23,169 versus $18,292 for females. The per capita income for the county was $15,068. About 12.90% of families and 16.90% of the population were below the poverty line, including 21.60% of those under age 18 and 13.30% of those age 65 or over.

== Infrastructure ==
The town is served by the Southeast Colorado Hospital. Springfield Municipal Airport is located a few miles north of Springfield.

== Politics ==
Like all of the High Plains, Baca County has long been overwhelmingly Republican. The last Democrat to carry the county was Lyndon Johnson in his 1964 landslide – when he carried all but three Colorado counties. The Republican tilt has been increasing in recent elections; in 2016, 2020, and 2024, Donald Trump's performance was each time the best by any Republican in county history.

United States presidential election results for Baca County, Colorado
Year	Republican		Democratic		Third party(ies)	
Year	No.	%	No.	%	No.	%
1892	157	39.55%	0	0.00%	240	60.45%
1896	125	47.71%	135	51.53%	2	0.76%
1900	157	53.95%	134	46.05%	0	0.00%
1904	203	60.60%	130	38.81%	2	0.60%
1908	215	53.48%	179	44.53%	8	1.99%
1912	318	28.24%	430	38.19%	378	33.57%
1916	826	35.03%	1,294	54.88%	238	10.09%
1920	1,615	63.21%	695	27.20%	245	9.59%
1924	1,174	46.35%	653	25.78%	706	27.87%
1928	2,108	78.48%	524	19.51%	54	2.01%
1932	1,349	34.02%	2,247	56.67%	369	9.31%
1936	1,288	39.46%	1,797	55.06%	179	5.48%
1940	1,567	56.53%	1,167	42.10%	38	1.37%
1944	1,528	61.89%	941	38.11%	0	0.00%
1948	1,260	47.51%	1,368	51.58%	24	0.90%
1952	2,122	65.57%	1,094	33.81%	20	0.62%
1956	1,715	59.63%	1,150	39.99%	11	0.38%
1960	1,815	65.48%	952	34.34%	5	0.18%
1964	1,241	47.40%	1,366	52.18%	11	0.42%
1968	1,441	57.55%	719	28.71%	344	13.74%
1972	1,645	73.93%	527	23.69%	53	2.38%
1976	1,303	51.97%	1,164	46.43%	40	1.60%
1980	1,999	74.26%	551	20.47%	142	5.27%
1984	1,903	75.85%	580	23.12%	26	1.04%
1988	1,670	65.34%	851	33.29%	35	1.37%
1992	1,240	47.29%	726	27.69%	656	25.02%
1996	1,321	59.53%	659	29.70%	239	10.77%
2000	1,663	73.00%	531	23.31%	84	3.69%
2004	1,680	76.85%	483	22.10%	23	1.05%
2008	1,572	72.28%	536	24.64%	67	3.08%
2012	1,559	74.03%	467	22.17%	80	3.80%
2016	1,753	81.42%	283	13.14%	117	5.43%
2020	1,867	83.91%	317	14.25%	41	1.84%
2024	1,686	84.13%	275	13.72%	43	2.15%

United States Senate election results for Baca County, Colorado2
Year	Republican		Democratic		Third party(ies)	
Year	No.	%	No.	%	No.	%
2020	1,816	82.70%	329	14.98%	51	2.32%

United States Senate election results for Baca County, Colorado3
Year	Republican		Democratic		Third party(ies)	
Year	No.	%	No.	%	No.	%
2022	1,303	74.67%	371	21.26%	71	4.07%

Colorado Gubernatorial election results for Baca County
Year	Republican		Democratic		Third party(ies)	
Year	No.	%	No.	%	No.	%
2022	1,103	63.14%	298	17.06%	346	19.81%

== Communities ==
=== Towns ===
- Campo
- Pritchett
- Springfield (county seat)
- Two Buttes
- Vilas
- Walsh

=== Unincorporated communities ===
- Bartlett
- Buckeye Crossroads
- Deora
- Edler
- Lycan
- Stonington
- Stuart
- Utleyville

== Gallery ==
Area affected by 1930s Dust Bowl

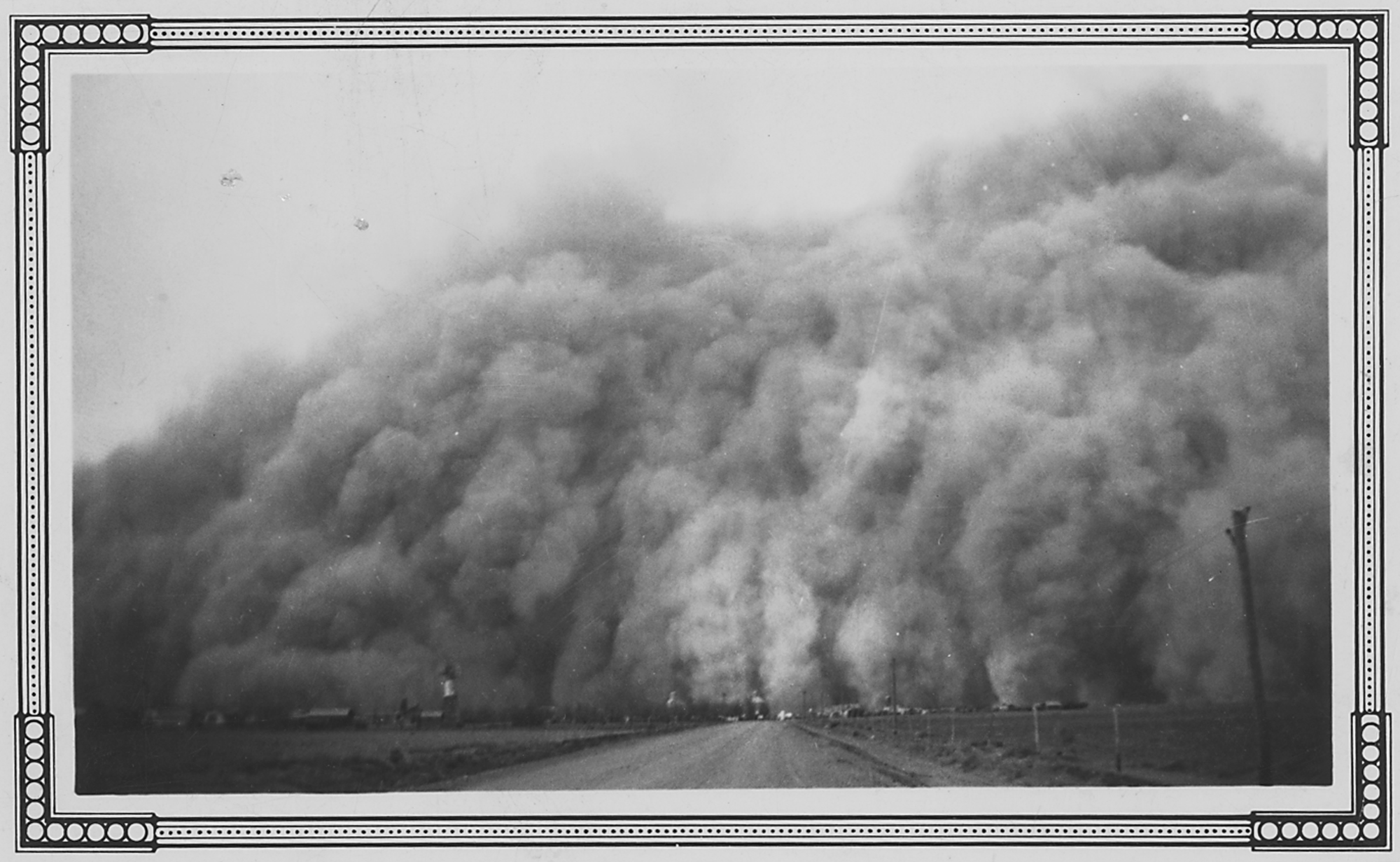
Dust Storm in Baca County, 1935.

== See also ==
- Bibliography of Colorado
- Geography of Colorado
- History of Colorado
  - National Register of Historic Places listings in Baca County, Colorado
- Index of Colorado-related articles
- List of Colorado-related lists
  - List of counties in Colorado
- Outline of Colorado
