= Springfield, Colorado =

Town in Colorado, United States

- Town
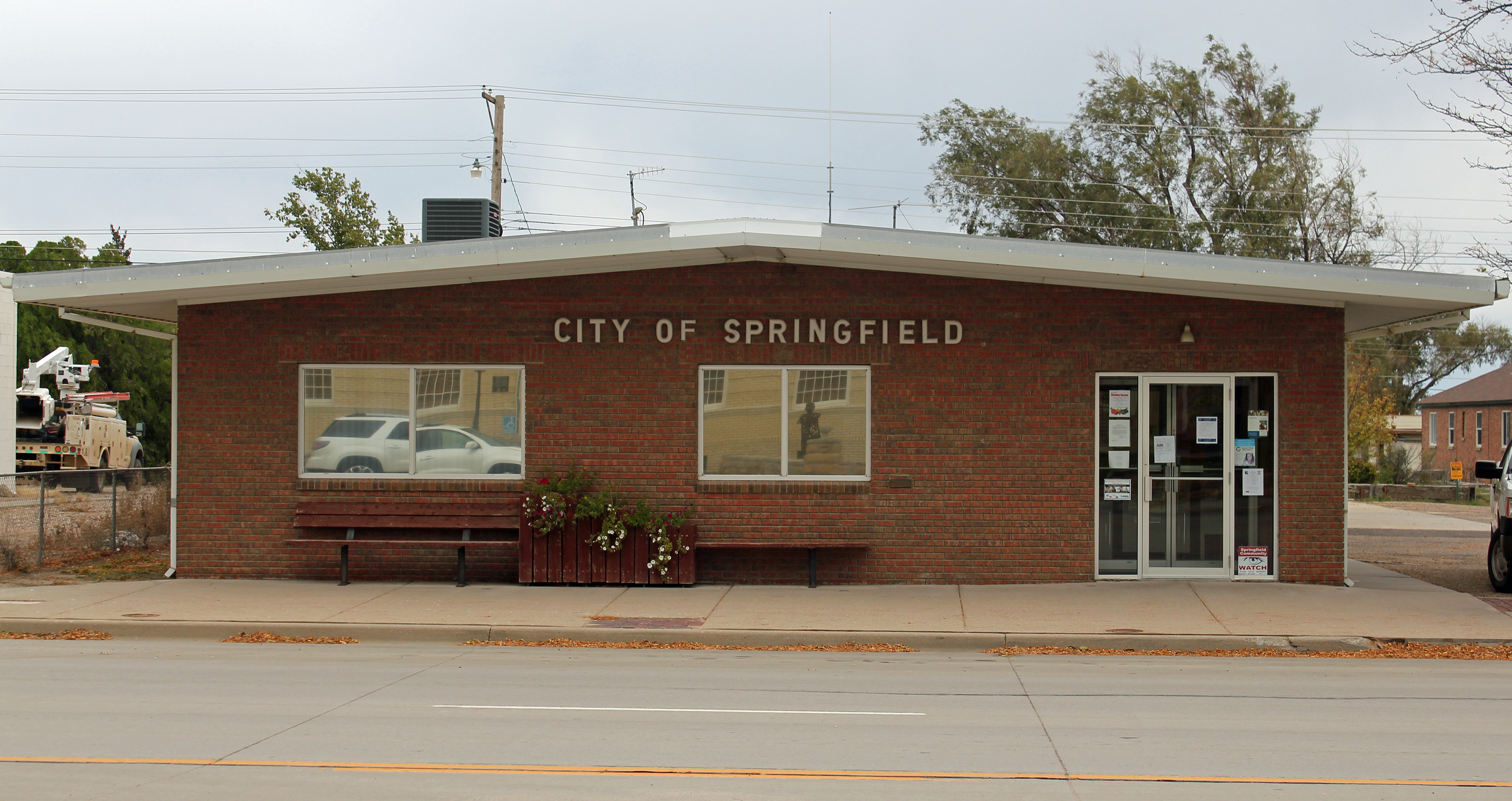
- Springfield town hall (2015)

- Seal

- Location within Baca County and Colorado
- Coordinates: 37°24′29″N 102°37′28″W
- Country: United States
- State: Colorado
- County: Baca
- Founded: 1888
- Incorporated: January 16, 1889

Government
  - Type: Statutory Town

Area
  - Total: 1.13 sq mi (2.92 km^{2})
  - Land: 1.13 sq mi (2.92 km^{2})
  - Water: 0 sq mi (0.00 km^{2})
- Elevation: 4,370 ft (1,330 m)

Population (2020)
  - Total: 1,325
  - Density: 1,180/sq mi (454/km^{2})
- Time zone: UTC−7 (MST)
  - Summer (DST): UTC−6 (MDT)
- ZIP Code: 81073
- Area code: 719
- FIPS code: 08-73330
- GNIS ID: 2413324
- Website: springfieldco.gov

Springfield is a statutory town in, the county seat of, and the most populous town in Baca County, Colorado, United States. The population was 1,325 at the 2020 census.

== History ==
Frank and Jim Tipton settled in Las Animas, Colorado in 1886. In 1888 or 1889, the Tiptons secured the title to 80 acres which was the original townsite. They did this using a "soldiers script" and named the town after Springfield, Missouri, since this is where the Tipton brothers had come from.

== Geography ==
Springfield is located in north-central Baca County, approximately 30 miles north of the Oklahoma state line.

U.S. Routes 287 and 385 pass through the center of the town, leading north 47 miles (76 km) to Lamar, Colorado, and south 49 miles (79 km) to Boise City, Oklahoma. U.S. Route 160 passes just to the south of the town, leading west 120 miles (190 km) to Trinidad, Colorado, and east 50 miles (80 km) to Johnson City, Kansas.

Springfield Municipal Airport (FAA ID: 8V7) is four miles north.

According to the United States Census Bureau, the town has a total area of 1.1 square miles (2.9 km^{2}), all of it land.

=== Climate ===
Springfield has a cool semi-arid climate (Köppen BSk) with hot summers featuring mild mornings and occasional heavy thunderstorm rains, and highly variable winters that range from very warm and windy to frigid and relatively still.

Climate data for Springfield 7 WSW, Colorado (1971 to 2000; extremes 1956 to 2001)
Month	Jan	Feb	Mar	Apr	May	Jun	Jul	Aug	Sep	Oct	Nov	Dec	Year
Record high °F (°C)	79 (26)	83 (28)	90 (32)	97 (36)	104 (40)	111 (44)	109 (43)	104 (40)	101 (38)	95 (35)	86 (30)	78 (26)	111 (44)
Mean daily maximum °F (°C)	44.9 (7.2)	50.1 (10.1)	57.8 (14.3)	66.3 (19.1)	75.0 (23.9)	86.3 (30.2)	91.3 (32.9)	88.8 (31.6)	80.2 (26.8)	69.7 (20.9)	54.4 (12.4)	45.3 (7.4)	67.5 (19.7)
Mean daily minimum °F (°C)	14.9 (−9.5)	18.4 (−7.6)	24.1 (−4.4)	32.7 (0.4)	43.2 (6.2)	54.2 (12.3)	58.4 (14.7)	57.4 (14.1)	48.4 (9.1)	36.8 (2.7)	24.1 (−4.4)	16.7 (−8.5)	35.8 (2.1)
Record low °F (°C)	−23 (−31)	−22 (−30)	−10 (−23)	5 (−15)	20 (−7)	37 (3)	44 (7)	40 (4)	21 (−6)	6 (−14)	−11 (−24)	−18 (−28)	−23 (−31)
Average precipitation inches (mm)	0.47 (12)	0.48 (12)	1.16 (29)	1.64 (42)	2.86 (73)	2.00 (51)	2.49 (63)	2.46 (62)	1.37 (35)	0.96 (24)	0.73 (19)	0.42 (11)	17.04 (433)
Average snowfall inches (cm)	5.4 (14)	4.4 (11)	7.7 (20)	3.3 (8.4)	1.0 (2.5)	0.0 (0.0)	0.0 (0.0)	0.0 (0.0)	0.4 (1.0)	1.8 (4.6)	4.4 (11)	5.1 (13)	33.5 (85.5)
Average precipitation days (≥ 0.01 inch)	3.8	3.5	5.8	5.6	9.0	6.8	8.1	7.4	5.3	4.0	3.7	3.7	66.7
Average snowy days (≥ 0.1 inch)	3.8	3.2	3.5	1.4	0.3	0.0	0.0	0.0	0.2	0.7	2.7	3.4	19.2
Source: NOAA

== Demographics ==
Historical population
Census	Pop.	Note	%±
1920	295		—
1930	1,393		372.2%
1940	1,082		−22.3%
1950	2,131		97.0%
1960	1,791		−16.0%
1970	1,660		−7.3%
1980	1,657		−0.2%
1990	1,475		−11.0%
2000	1,562		5.9%
2010	1,451		−7.1%
2020	1,325		−8.7%
U.S. Decennial Census

=== 2020 census ===
As of the 2020 census, Springfield had a population of 1,325. The median age was 44.1 years. 20.3% of residents were under the age of 18 and 25.5% of residents were 65 years of age or older. For every 100 females there were 98.1 males, and for every 100 females age 18 and over there were 95.6 males age 18 and over.

0.0% of residents lived in urban areas, while 100.0% lived in rural areas.

There were 624 households in Springfield, of which 25.6% had children under the age of 18 living in them. Of all households, 38.8% were married-couple households, 23.4% were households with a male householder and no spouse or partner present, and 31.3% were households with a female householder and no spouse or partner present. About 40.9% of all households were made up of individuals and 21.0% had someone living alone who was 65 years of age or older.

There were 737 housing units, of which 15.3% were vacant. The homeowner vacancy rate was 2.3% and the rental vacancy rate was 12.8%.

Racial composition as of the 2020 census
Race	Number	Percent
White	1,136	85.7%
Black or African American	10	0.8%
American Indian and Alaska Native	21	1.6%
Asian	9	0.7%
Native Hawaiian and Other Pacific Islander	0	0.0%
Some other race	48	3.6%
Two or more races	101	7.6%
Hispanic or Latino (of any race)	158	11.9%

=== 2010 census ===
As of the census of 2010, there were 1,451 people, 715 households, and 409 families residing in the town. The population density was 1,793.8 inhabitants per square mile (692.6/km^{2}). There were 838 housing units at an average density of 962.4 units per square mile (371.6 units/km^{2}). The racial makeup of the town was 94.88% White, 1.15% Native American, 0.19% Asian, 2.56% from other races, and 1.22% from two or more races. Hispanic or Latino of any race were 5.83% of the population.

There were 715 households, out of which 23.1% had children under the age of 18 living with them, 44.8% were married couples living together, 9.9% had a female householder with no husband present, and 42.7% were non-families. 38.6% of all households were made up of individuals, and 20.6% had someone living alone who was 65 years of age or older. The average household size was 2.10 and the average family size was 2.80.

In the town, the population was spread out, with 21.4% under the age of 18, 6.7% from 18 to 24, 22.1% from 25 to 44, 23.7% from 45 to 64, and 26.2% who were 65 years of age or older. The median age was 45 years. For every 100 females, there were 88.9 males. For every 100 females age 18 and over, there were 86.3 males.

The median income for a household in the town was $28,099, and the median income for a family was $34,107. Males had a median income of $25,385 versus $16,339 for females. The per capita income for the town was $13,890. About 14.4% of families and 16.8% of the population were below the poverty line, including 18.6% of those under age 18 and 17.8% of those age 65 or over.

== Education ==
Springfield School District RE-4 is served by two schools:

- Springfield Elementary School
- Springfield Junior/Senior High School

The town has a library.

== Notable people ==
Notable individuals who were born in or have lived in Springfield include:

- Alfred A. Arraj (1906–1992), U.S. federal judge

== See also ==
- Springfield Schoolhouse
