= Frontier Pathways Scenic and Historic Byway =

Colorado Scenic and Historic Byway

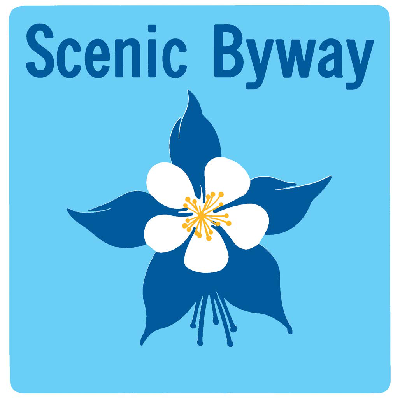
Frontier Pathways Scenic and Historic Byway

Route information
- Maintained by CDOT
- Length: 103 mi (166 km)
- Existed: 1998–present

Major junctions
- East end: I-70 / SH 96 Pueblo or I-70 / SH 165 Colorado City
- West end: SH 96 / SH 69 Westcliffe

Location
- Country: United States
- State: Colorado
- Counties: Custer, Pueblo

Highway system
- Scenic Byways; National; National Forest; BLM; NPS; Colorado State Highway System; Interstate; US; State; Scenic

The Frontier Pathways is a 103-mile (166 km) National Scenic Byway and Colorado Scenic and Historic Byway located in Custer and Pueblo counties, Colorado, US.

== Route ==
The western end of the byway begins in Westcliffe in Custer County and heads east on State Highway 96 (SH 96) towards Silver Cliff and the Wet Mountains. Sixteen miles (26 km) east of Westcliffe, the route approaches Hardscrabble Mountain and the junction with SH 165, where the route diverges on to southern and eastern sections.

The southern route follows SH 165 through a section of San Isabel National Forest, also passing Bishop Castle. The byway continues southeast through Fairview and San Isabel, then making an easterly turn towards Rye while leaving the national forest. The terminus of the southern section of the byway is in Colorado City.

The eastern route continues to follow SH 96 through Hardscrabble Pass and the San Isabel National Forest. As the byway descends from the mountains, it passes through Wetmore on its way east. The byway skirts Pueblo Reservoir within Lake Pueblo State Park before reaching its eastern terminus in Pubelo.

== Gallery ==
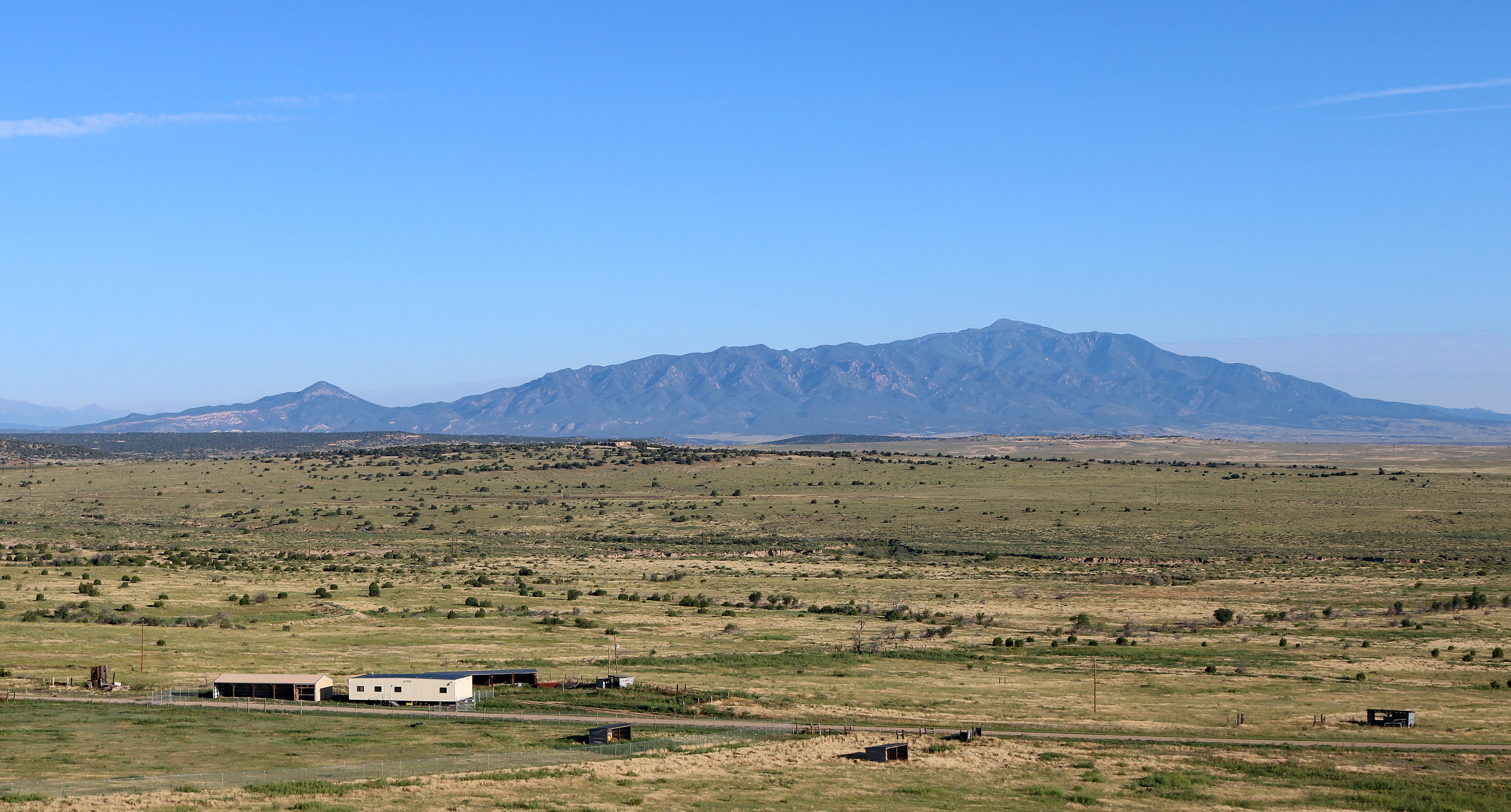
Greenhorn Mountain

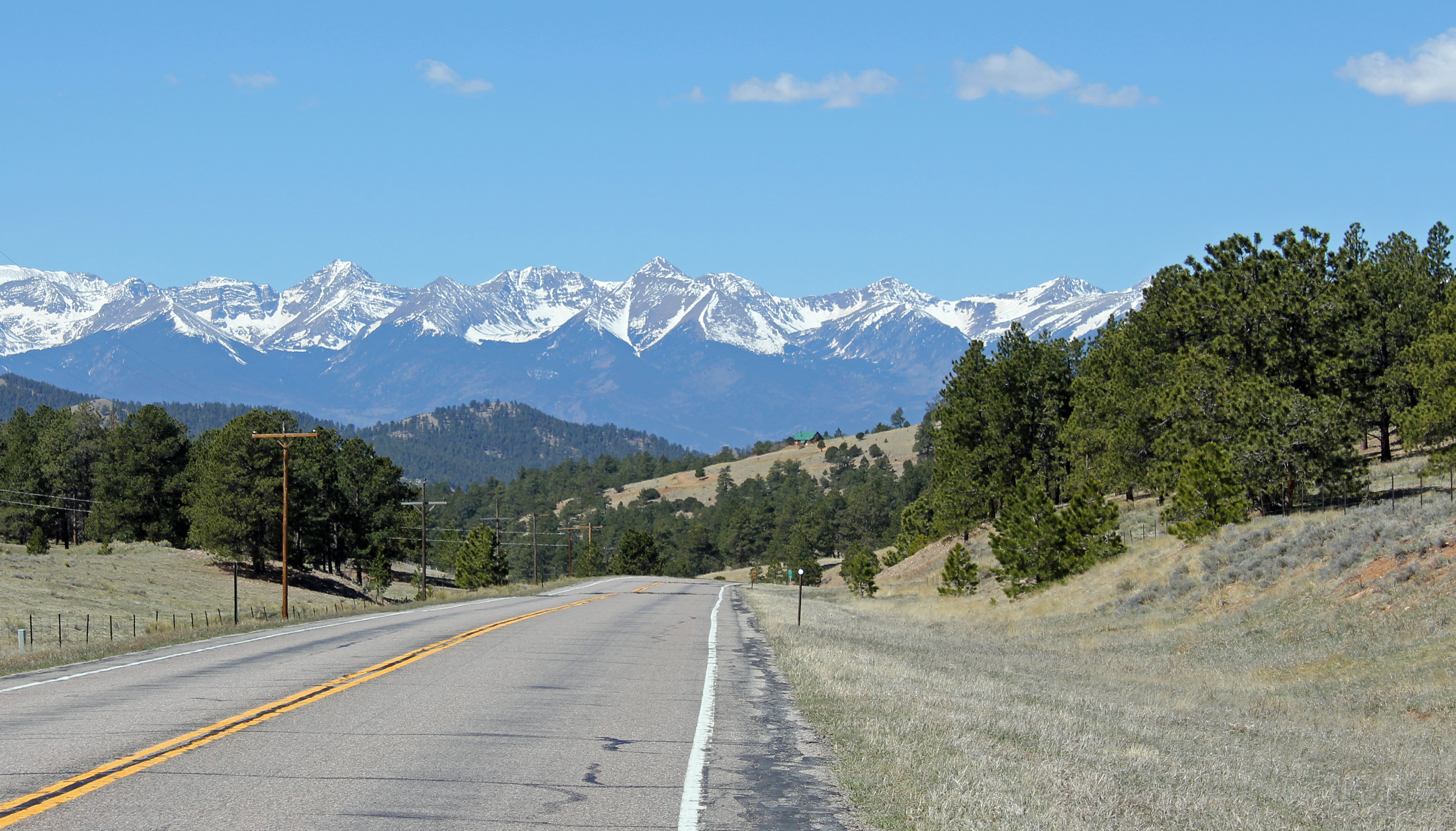
Hardscrabble Pass

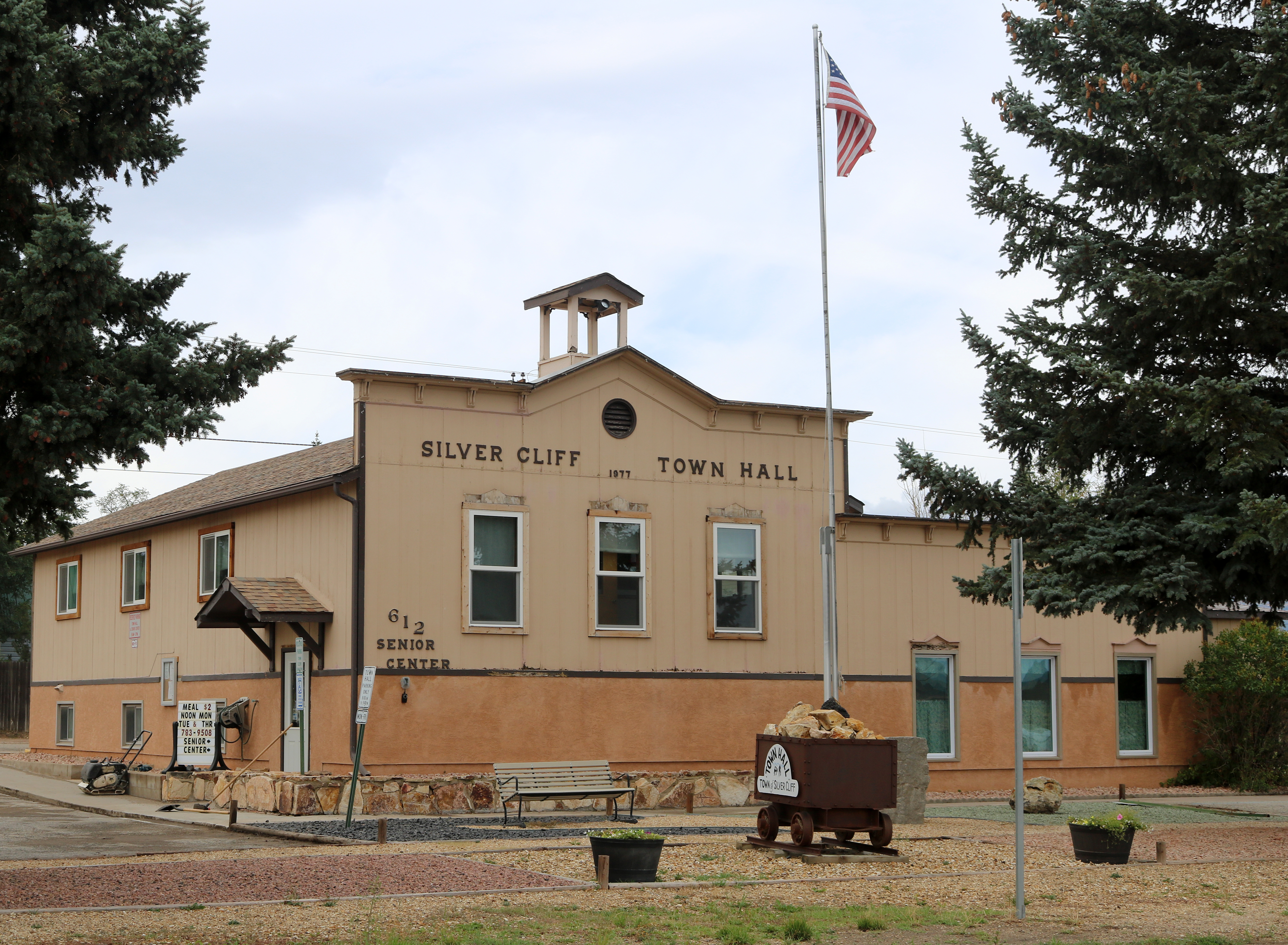
The Silver Cliff Town Hall

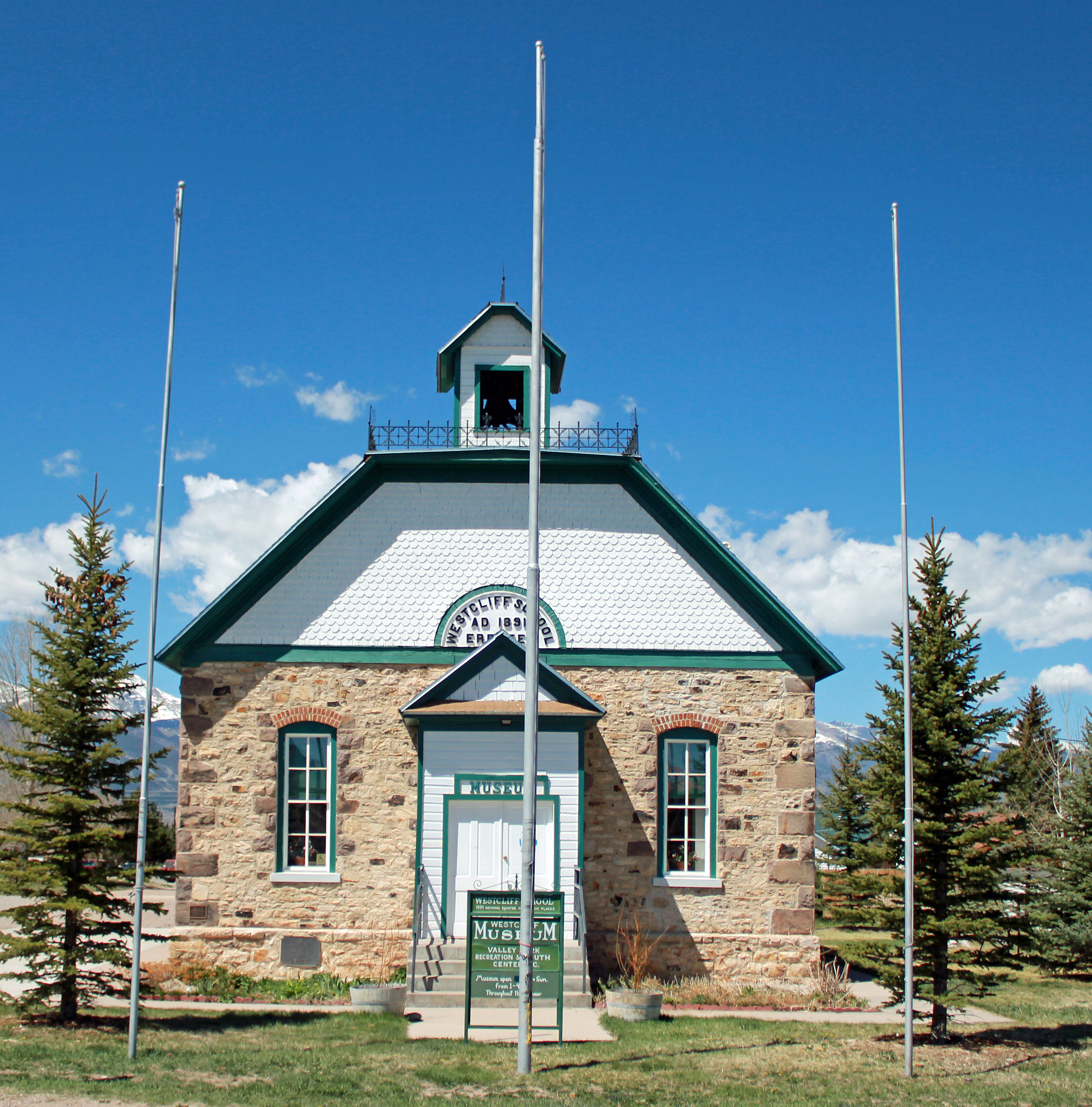
The Westcliffe School in Westcliffe

== See also ==
- History Colorado
