= Colorado State Highway 96 =

State highway in Colorado, United States

State Highway 96
- Map of eastern Colorado with SH 96 highlighted in red

Route information
- Maintained by CDOT
- Length: 207.45 mi (333.86 km)

Major junctions
- West end: SH 69 in Westcliffe
- I-25 / US 85 / US 87 in Pueblo; US 50 in Pueblo; US 287 near Eads; US 385 in Sheridan Lake
- East end: K-96 at the Kansas border in Towner

Location
- Country: United States
- State: Colorado
- Counties: Custer, Pueblo, Otero, Crowley, Kiowa

Highway system
- Colorado State Highway System; Interstate; US; State; Scenic
← SH 95	→ SH 97

State Highway 96 (SH 96) is a state highway in eastern Colorado. Its western terminus is an intersection with SH 69 in Westcliffe. Its eastern terminus is at the Kansas state line, east of Towner, where it continues as K-96.

== Frontier Pathways Scenic and Historic Byway ==
The section of the highway between Pueblo and Silver Cliff is designated as part of the Frontier Pathways Scenic and Historic Byway.

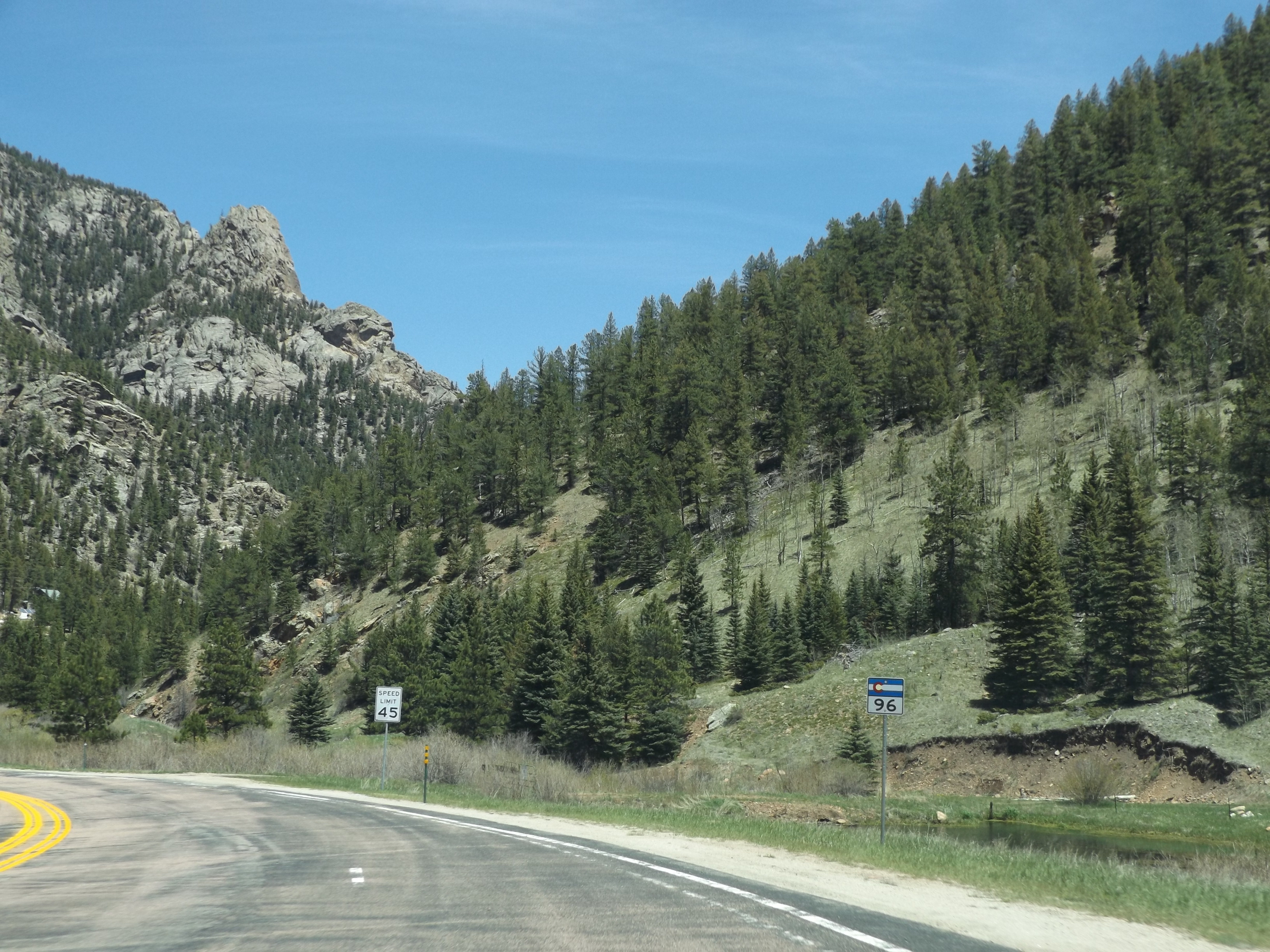
SH 96 in the mountains

The highway passes and intersects many major highways and several state highways along its 207-mile route. In Custer County, Highway 96 crosses the Wet Mountains and passes through the San Isabel National Forest. Its highest point is Hardscrabble Pass at 9,085 feet.

== History ==
The route was established in the 1920s, when the routing was exactly as it is today. Several portions were paved by 1946 including the segment from Pueblo to Boone, Olney Springs to Sugar City, and from Haswell to the Kansas state line. The segment of SH 96 concurrent with US 50 was constructed as an expressway by 1957. The entire route was paved by 1964.

== Major intersections ==
County	Location	mi	km	Destinations	Notes
Custer	Westcliffe	0	0.0	SH 69 – Walsenburg, Salida	Western terminus
Custer		16.5	26.6	SH 165 south – Rye, Colorado City	Northern terminus of SH 165
Custer	Wetmore	26	42	SH 67 north – Florence	Southern terminus of SH 67
Pueblo	Pueblo	52	84	SH 45 (Pueblo Boulevard)	
Pueblo	Pueblo			US 50 Bus.	
Pueblo	Pueblo			N. Bradford Street To I-25 / US 85 / US 87 north	
Pueblo	Pueblo	56	90	SH 227 south – Salt Creek	Northern terminus of SH 227
Pueblo	Pueblo	58	93	SH 47 west	Eastern terminus of SH 47
Pueblo	Pueblo	58	93	US 50 west – Cañon City	Western terminus of US 50 concurrency
Pueblo	Pueblo	61	98	– Pueblo Memorial Airport	
Pueblo	Pueblo	61.5	99.0	SH 233 south (Baxter Road)	Northern terminus of SH 233
Pueblo		64	103	SH 231 south	Northern terminus of SH 231
Pueblo		70	110	US 50 east – La Junta	Eastern end of US 50 concurrency
Pueblo	Boone	75	121	SH 209 south	Northern terminus of SH 209
Crowley				SH 167 south – Fowler	Northern terminus of SH 167
Crowley	Crowley	99	159	SH 207 south – Manzanola	Northern terminus of SH 207
Crowley	Ordway	105	169	SH 71 south – Rocky Ford	Western end of SH 71 concurrency
Crowley	Ordway			SH 71 north – Punkin Center	Eastern end of SH 71 concurrency
Kiowa	Eads	165	266	US 287 north – Kit Carson	Western end of US 287 concurrency
Kiowa		168	270	US 287 south – Lamar	Eastern end of US 287 concurrency
Kiowa				US 385 south – Lamar	Western end of US 385 concurrency
Kiowa	Sheridan Lake	193	311	US 385 north – Cheyenne Wells	Eastern end of US 385 concurrency
Kansas state line
Greeley		207.5	333.9	K-96 east – Tribune	Eastern terminus; continuation into Kansas as K-96
1.000 mi = 1.609 km; 1.000 km = 0.621 mi: Concurrency terminus

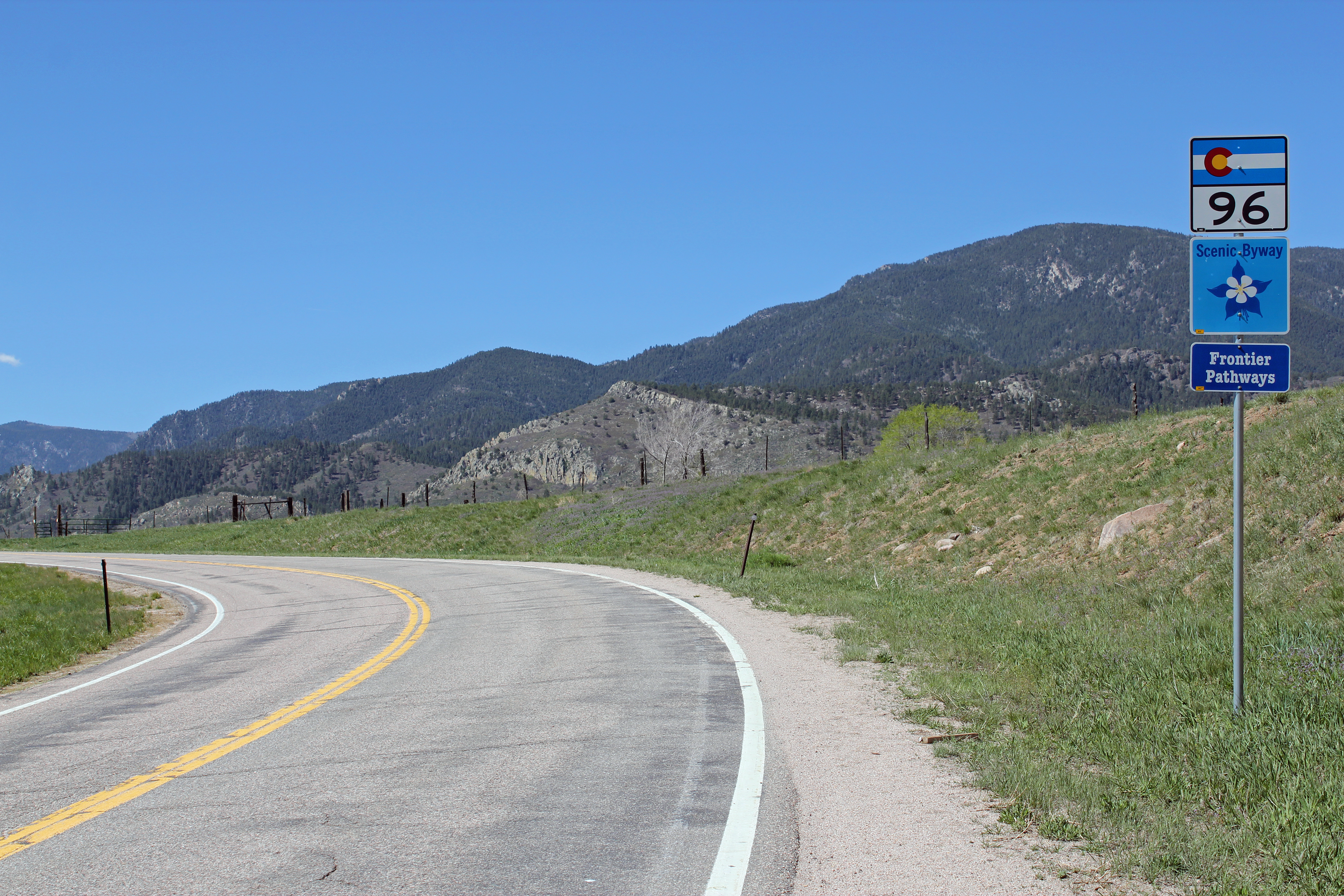
The highway just west of Wetmore.

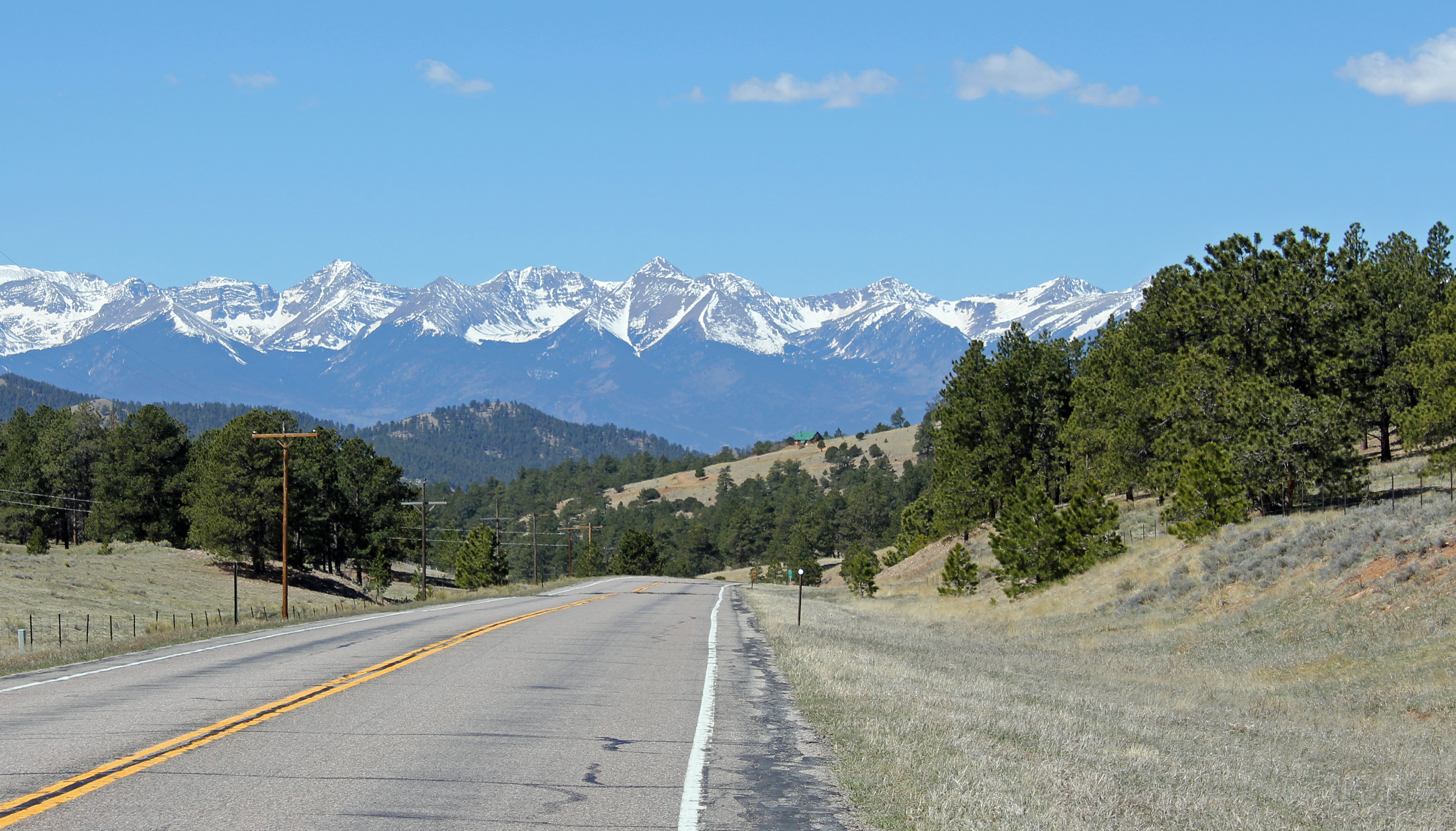
Hardscrabble Pass, the highest point on the highway.

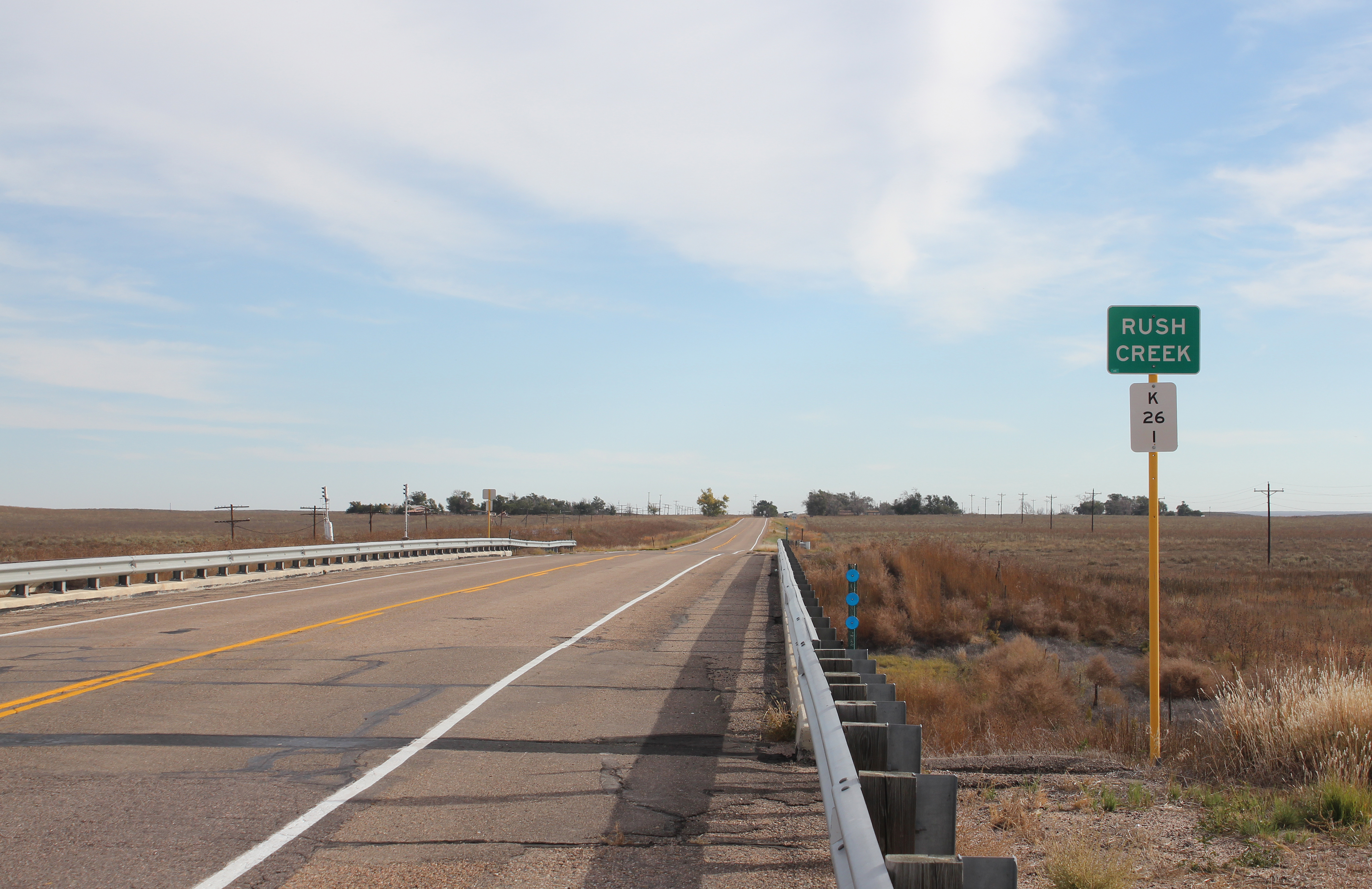
The highway passes over Rush Creek in Kiowa County.
