= Beulah Valley, Colorado =

Census-designated place in Pueblo County, Colorado, United States

- Census-designated place
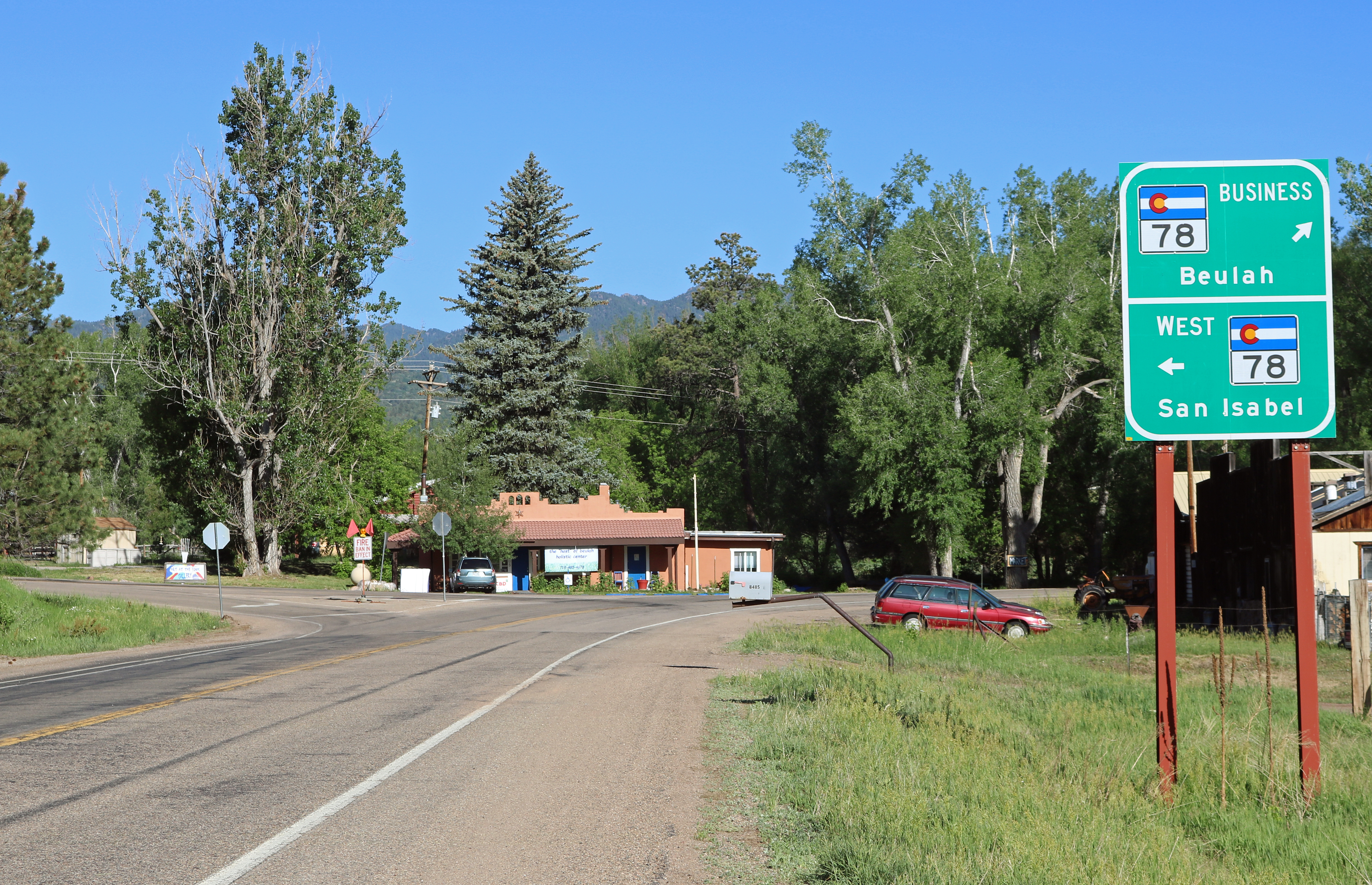
- Entering the Beulah Valley from the east on Colorado State Highway 78

- Location of the Beulah Valley CDP in Pueblo County, Colorado
- Coordinates: 38°04′23″N 104°59′25″W
- Country: United States
- State: Colorado
- County: Pueblo
- Settled: 1862

Government
  - Type: Unincorporated community
  - Body: Pueblo County

Area
  - Total: 2.572 sq mi (6.662 km^{2})
  - Land: 2.571 sq mi (6.660 km^{2})
  - Water: 0.00077 sq mi (0.002 km^{2})
- Elevation: 6,172 ft (1,881 m)

Population (2020)
  - Total: 518
  - Density: 201/sq mi (77.8/km^{2})
- Time zone: UTC−07:00 (MST)
  - Summer (DST): UTC−06:00 (MDT)
- ZIP Code: Beulah 81023
- Area code: 719
- GNIS town ID: 2407835
- FIPS code: FIPS 08 06602

Beulah Valley is a census-designated place (CDP) in Pueblo County, Colorado, United States. The CDP is a part of the Pueblo, CO Metropolitan Statistical Area. The population of the Beulah Valley CDP was 518 at the United States Census 2020. The Beulah post office (Zip Code 81023) serves the area.

== History ==
The town of Mace's Hole was settled in 1862. The town was named for Juan Maes, anglicized to "Mace," a bandit who used the valley for a hideout. The Mace's Hole, Colorado Territory, post office opened on April 23, 1873, and Colorado became a state on August 1, 1876. A local preacher took umbrage at the town's name and suggested the biblical name Beulah as a more wholesome alternative. The Mace's Hole post office was renamed Beulah on October 25, 1876. The name is a reference to Isaiah 62:4; it comes from the Hebrew for "married."

Bishop Castle, constructed by Jim Bishop, otherwise known as a "one man castle", is located between Beulah and San Isabel, Colorado.

== Geography ==
At the 2020 United States census, the Beulah Valley CDP had an area of 1,646 acres (6.662 km^{2}), including 0.49 acres (0.002 km^{2}) of water.

== Demographics ==
Beulah Valley CDP, Colorado
Year	Pop.	±%
2000	1,164	—
2010	556	−52.2%
2020	518	−6.8%
Source: United States Census Bureau

As of the census of 2000, there were 1,164 people, 497 households, and 356 families residing in the CDP. The population density was 10.6 people per square mile (4.1 people/km^{2}). There were 718 housing units at an average density of 6.5 per square mile (2.5/km^{2}). The racial makeup of the CDP was 95.96% White, 0.26% African American, 0.77% Native American, 1.46% from other races, and 1.55% from two or more races. Hispanic or Latino of any race were 6.01% of the population.

There were 497 households, out of which 23.5% had children under the age of 18 living with them, 64.4% were married couples living together, 4.2% had a female householder with no husband present, and 28.2% were non-families. 23.7% of all households were made up of individuals, and 8.0% had someone living alone who was 65 years of age or older. The average household size was 2.34 and the average family size was 2.77.

In the CDP, the population was spread out, with 21.0% under the age of 18, 4.0% from 18 to 24, 22.7% from 25 to 44, 37.2% from 45 to 64, and 15.1% who were 65 years of age or older. The median age was 46 years. For every 100 females, there were 102.1 males. For every 100 females age 18 and over, there were 102.2 males.

The median income for a household in the CDP was $46,369, and the median income for a family was $58,259. Males had a median income of $37,031 versus $33,750 for females. The per capita income for the CDP was $23,252. About 1.6% of families and 6.5% of the population were below the poverty line, including 7.2% of those under age 18 and none of those age 65 or over.

The United States Census Bureau initially defined the Beulah Valley CDP for the United States Census 2000.

== Education ==
It is in the Pueblo County School District 70. Zoned schools include Beulah Elementary School, Beulah Middle School, and Rye High School.

== See also ==
- Front Range Urban Corridor
