= Colorado State Highway 45 =

State highway in Pueblo, Colorado, United States

State Highway 45
- Pueblo Boulevard
- SH 45 highlighted in red

Route information
- Maintained by CDOT
- Length: 9.126 mi (14.687 km)
- Existed: 1964–present

Major junctions
- South end: I-25 in Pueblo
- SH 78 in Pueblo; SH 96 in Pueblo
- North end: US 50 in Pueblo West

Location
- Country: United States
- State: Colorado
- Counties: Pueblo

Highway system
- Colorado State Highway System; Interstate; US; State; Scenic
← SH 44	→ SH 46

State Highway 45 (SH 45), also known as Pueblo Boulevard, is an expressway in the city of Pueblo. It is 9.126 miles (14.687 km) long. Its southern terminus is at Interstate 25 (I-25) and its northern terminus is U.S. Route 50 (US 50). Plans are waiting to be approved to expand the expressway to six lanes, build a new interchange with US 50, and fix lane narrowing.

== Route description ==
The route begins at I-25. It traverses just south of Lake Minnequa and the Minnequa Business District in southern Pueblo. It intersects SH 78 and SH 96. The route then continues, intersecting several other city streets. The road comes to an end at US 50. The street continues northwest as Wildhorse Road in Pueblo West.

== History ==
The route started as a rural highway in the 1960s, with the first section from I-25 northwest to SH 96 opening by 1966. By 1973, it was extended north to 11th Street, and was completed north to US 50 by 1975.

== Future ==
Because of growing population in Pueblo, especially in the western side around SH 96, an extension of Highway 45 into a major highway in the area has been proposed. In theory, it would be useful to alleviate traffic jams in the area. SH 45 is planned to eventually continue northeast from US 50 to I-25 around Milepost 103.

== Major intersections ==
The entire route is in Pueblo County.

Location	mi	km	Destinations	Notes
Pueblo	0.000– 0.218	0.000– 0.351	I-25 / US 87 – Colorado Springs, Walsenburg	Southern terminus; I-25 exit 94
Pueblo	3.306	5.320	SH 78 south (Northern Avenue) – Beulah	Northern terminus of SH 78
Pueblo	4.918– 4.920	7.915– 7.918	SH 96 (Thatcher Avenue) – Westcliffe	
Pueblo West	9.038	14.545	US 50 – Cañon City, Pueblo	Northern terminus; Road continues north as Wildhorse Rd.
1.000 mi = 1.609 km; 1.000 km = 0.621 mi
