= Star Caywood =

American politician

Member of the Colorado House of Representatives from the 24th district
- In office January 11, 1967 – July 19, 1968
- Preceded by: M. Keith Singer
- Succeeded by: Virla Caywood

Member of the Colorado House of Representatives from the 63rd district
- In office January 1965 – January 1967
- Preceded by: District established
- Succeeded by: Clarence Quinlan

Member of the Colorado House of Representatives from the Huerfano County district
- In office January 1963 – January 1965
- Preceded by: Albert J. Tomsic
- Succeeded by: District disestablished

Personal details
- Born: Star Berton Caywood; October 6, 1915 Salida, Colorado
- Died: July 19, 1968 (aged 52) Walsenburg, Colorado
- Party: Democratic
- Spouse: Virla Ruth Caywood (née Smallwood)
- Children: None
- Profession: Abstractor; Insurance agent Real estate agent

Star Berton Caywood (October 6, 1915 – July 19, 1968) was a Democratic member of the Colorado House of Representatives. He served two complete two-year terms and part of a third term in the State House, serving from 1963 until his death in 1968.

== Early life and career ==
Caywood was born in Salida, Colorado in 1915. He attended the University of Denver but did not graduate. During World War II, he enlisted in the United States Army on October 26, 1943, and joined the 185th Replacement Company. He was stationed in the South Pacific, eventually became a staff sergeant, and was discharged on January 13, 1946.

Following the war, he moved to Walsenburg, Colorado, U.S. and worked as an abstractor, an insurance agent, and a real estate broker. In 1950, he was elected to the Walsenburg City Council.

== Elections ==
Caywood was first elected as a state representative in 1962 and was sworn in in January 1963. At the time, state representative districts were by county; he represented Huerfano County. He was re-elected in 1964, when the state established numbered districts for state representatives — districts not based on county boundaries. Caywood represented District 63 from 1965 to 1967. In 1966, he was elected to represent District 24 and began his final term in January 1967.

== Personal life ==
Caywood married Virla Ruth Smallwood in 1940. They had no children together, but she had a son from a previous relationship.

== Death ==
Caywood died in a boating accident on July 19, 1968. The accident occurred on Lake Martin in what is now Lathrop State Park, west of Walsenburg. Fishing with his wife and a friend in a small boat, Caywood drowned after the boat overturned in heavy winds. He tried swimming to shore but then turned around and began heading back to the boat when he went under. Pueblo Police Department divers found his body the next morning.

== State House succession ==
Following Caywood's death, a Democratic Party vacancy committee selected his wife, Virla Caywood, to fill out the remainder of his term. The committee chose Alamosa resident George W. Woodard to replace Caywood as a candidate in the fall 1968 statehouse elections.
