= Wet Mountains =

Mountain range in southern Colorado, United States

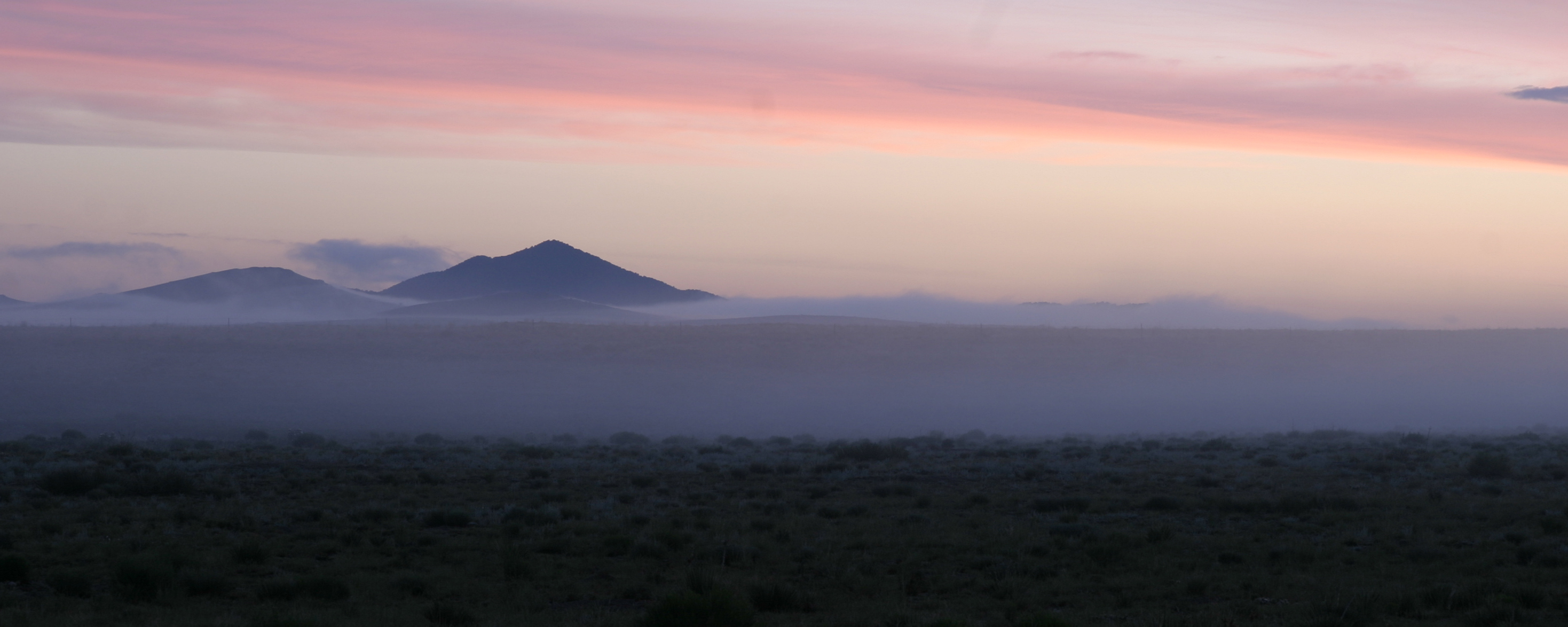
- View of Wet Mountain Valley, west of mountain range

Highest point
- Peak: Greenhorn Mountain
- Elevation: 3,763 m (12,346 ft)
- Coordinates: 37°52′53″N 105°00′48″W

Dimensions
- Length: 20 mi (32 km) Nw-SE

Naming
- Native name: Sierra Mojada (Spanish)

Geography
- Location within Colorado
- Country: United States
- State: Colorado
- Counties: Custer, Fremont, Huerfano and Pueblo
- Range coordinates: 38°10′N 105°12′W
- Parent range: Sangre de Cristo Mountains, Rocky Mountains

The Wet Mountains are a small mountain range in southern Colorado, named for the amount of snow they receive in the winter as compared to the dry Great Plains to the east. They are a sub-range of the Sangre de Cristo Mountains, in the southern Rocky Mountains System. There are three variant names of mountain range: Cuerno Verde, Greenhorn Mountains, and Sierra Mojada.

== Geography ==
Most of the Wet Mountains are within Custer County, stretching into Fremont County to the north, Huerfano County to the south, and Pueblo County to the east. The range runs approximately north to south from U.S. Highway 50 to Walsenburg a distance of more than 40 miles (64 km). The range is up to about 12 miles (19 km) wide and is bordered on the east by the Great Plains and on the west by the Wet Mountain Valley. The highest point is known as Greenhorn Mountain, which has multiple peaks, the highest of which reaches 12,346 feet (3,763 m). Greenhorn Peak, St. Charles Peak, and North Peak all reach above tree line. Most of the Wet Mountains are within the San Isabel National Forest.

=== Settlements ===
To the west the adjacent Wet Mountain Valley contains the small towns of Westcliffe and Silver Cliff. Within the mountains, Highway 96 weaves its way down to Wetmore by way of Hardscrabble Canyon and is one of only three main exits from the valley. The only other highway in the range is Highway 165, which travels through the range to Rye and Colorado City, and can also be noted for Lake Isabel and Bishop's Castle.

Other towns/communities in the small range include Beulah and Rosita, which is now a ghost town after a period of gold and silver mining over the past two centuries.

=== Transport ===
The summit of SH 96 in Hardscrabble Canyon has no official name, but is known locally as Hardscrabble Pass, elevation 9085 ft (2769 m). Its broad saddle is just east of Silver Cliff. The summit of SH 165 is Bigelow Divide, elevation 9403 ft (2866 m), near Ophir Creek Campground. The intersection of the two highways, between Silver Cliff and Wetmore, is McKenzie Junction, elevation 8359 ft. The gravel road that connects SH 78 from Beulah to SH 165 is known locally as Bathtub Pass, for a discarded roadside clawfoot bathtub.

== Geology ==
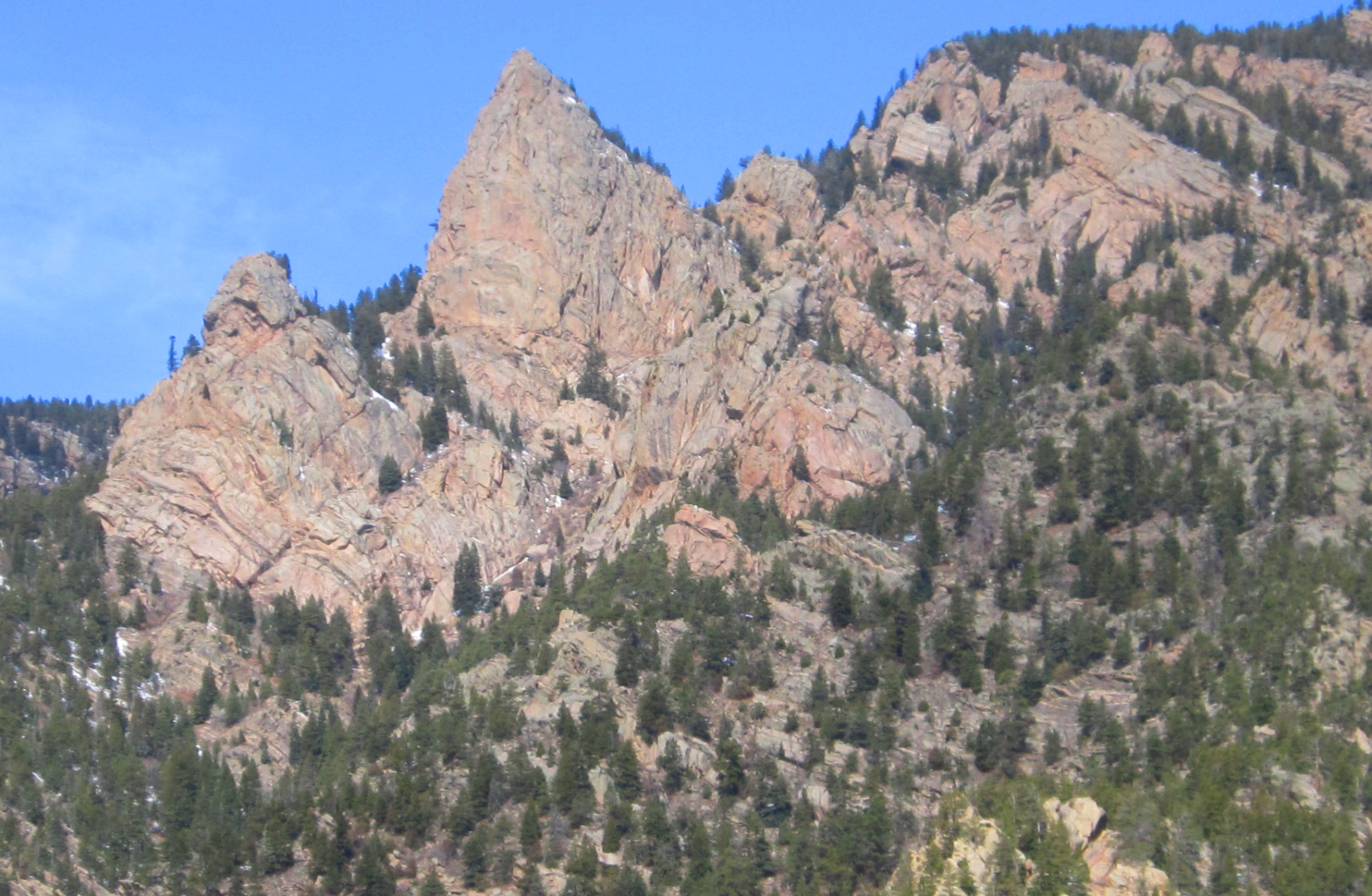
Granite rock formation in the Wet Mountains.

The Wet Mountains are the east flank of an uplifted faulted anticline. The core of the range consists of Precambrian granitic rocks with Paleozoic and Mesozoic strata in fault contact around the southern end and in the northwest. The range lies on the southeast end of the Central Colorado volcanic field and contains Eocene to Oligocene (38–29 Ma) volcanic rocks and carbonatites.

== See also ==
- List of articles on Sangre de Cristo Mountains
- Mountain ranges of Colorado
