= Colorado State Highway 76 =

In Colorado, State Highway 76 may refer to:

- Interstate 76 in Colorado, the only Colorado highway numbered 76 since 1976
- Colorado State Highway 76 (1923-1976) west of Pueblo, now SH 78
