= Tomšič =

Tomšič, Tomsic is a Slovene surname. Notable people with the surname include:

- Albert J. Tomsic (1925–2012), politician, attorney, and judge from Colorado, U.S.
- Jeff Tomsic, American film producer, writer and director
- Ron Tomsic (born 1933), American former basketball player
- Tomaž Tomšič (born 1972), Slovenian handball player
- Vida Tomšič (1913–1998), Slovenian partisan fighter during World War II
