= Fred Walsen =

American politician and businessman

5th Treasurer of Colorado
- In office January 10, 1883 – January 13, 1885
- Governor: James Benton Grant
- Preceded by: W. C. Sanders
- Succeeded by: George R. Swallow

Personal details
- Born: Henrich Anton Fredrich Walsen; June 14, 1841 Petershagen, Germany
- Died: February 15, 1906 (aged 64) Denver, Colorado
- Party: Republican
- Spouse(s): Emilie F. Sporleder (1867-1896); Emma Storck (1897-1906, his death)
- Children: Four
- Profession: Banker, businessman, landowner, politician

Fred Walsen (June 14, 1841 – February 15, 1906) was a banker, businessman, landowner and politician from Colorado, U.S. The city of Walsenburg, Colorado is named for him, and he was the city's first mayor. He served as the fifth treasurer of the state of Colorado, from 1883 to 1885.

== Early life ==
Henrich Anton Fredrich Walsen was born in Petershagen, Germany on June 14, 1841. When he turned 18, he emigrated to the United States, sailing from Germany to New Orleans. From there, he traveled up the Mississippi River to St. Louis and opened a cigar shop there. Upon the outbreak of the Civil War, Walsen enlisted in the Union Army on April 12, 1861, joining the Missouri Volunteer Militia, and later, the Missouri National Guard. In 1864, he headed west and settled in Fort Garland, Colorado. In Fort Garland, he worked as a store clerk, and by 1867 he had become a part-owner of the store.

== Walsenburg ==
In 1870, with money saved from his business in Fort Garland, he moved to what is now Walsenburg. He soon became a leader in the town, and it was incorporated as a city in 1873 and named for him. The original spelling was "Walsenburgh", but the final "h" was eventually dropped. He was elected the city's first mayor and served on the city's board of trustees. Over time in southern Colorado, Walsen accumulated large holdings of land and large herds of livestock, including sheep and cattle. In 1889, he started Walsenburg's first bank, eventually selling it in 1904. In addition, he was in the railroad tie business, selling ties and utility poles to railroads laying new track in southern Colorado and New Mexico.

== Colorado State Treasurer ==
Building on the expertise he acquired as a banker, in 1882 Walsen ran as a Republican for the office of Colorado State Treasurer. In the general election, he defeated his two opponents, getting 31,085 votes. Democrat Dennis Sullivan got 28,930 votes, and a third candidate, J. L. Heirzinger, received 1,231 votes. He took office on January 10, 1883 and began serving the two-year term. He was Colorado's fifth treasurer after statehood.

== Denver ==
In 1883, upon being sworn in as state treasurer, Walsen moved his family from Walsenburg to Denver. He built a house at 1805 Grant Avenue (now Grant Street) and lived there the remainder of his life.

== Personal life and death ==
Walsen married Emilie F. Sporleder on July 18, 1867 in St. Louis. Together, they had four children, three girls and a boy. Emilie died on December 21, 1896. About one year later, on December 28, 1897, Walsen married St. Louis resident Emma Storck. They had no children.

Fred Walsen died of dropsy in Denver on February 15, 1906, aged 64.

The Denver Public Library holds the Fred Walsen Papers, a small collection of eight items.

Political offices
Preceded by W. C. Sanders	Treasurer of Colorado; 1883–1885	Succeeded by George R. Swallow
