= John R. Petrus =

American politician

John R. Petrus (October 23, 1923 - October 2, 2013) was an American politician. He was a member of the Wisconsin State Assembly.

== Biography ==
Petrus was born in Walsenburg, Colorado. He graduated from the University of Wisconsin-Madison.

== Career ==
Petrus was elected to the Assembly in 1952. He was a Republican.
