= Hardscrabble Pass =

Mountain pass in Colorado, USA

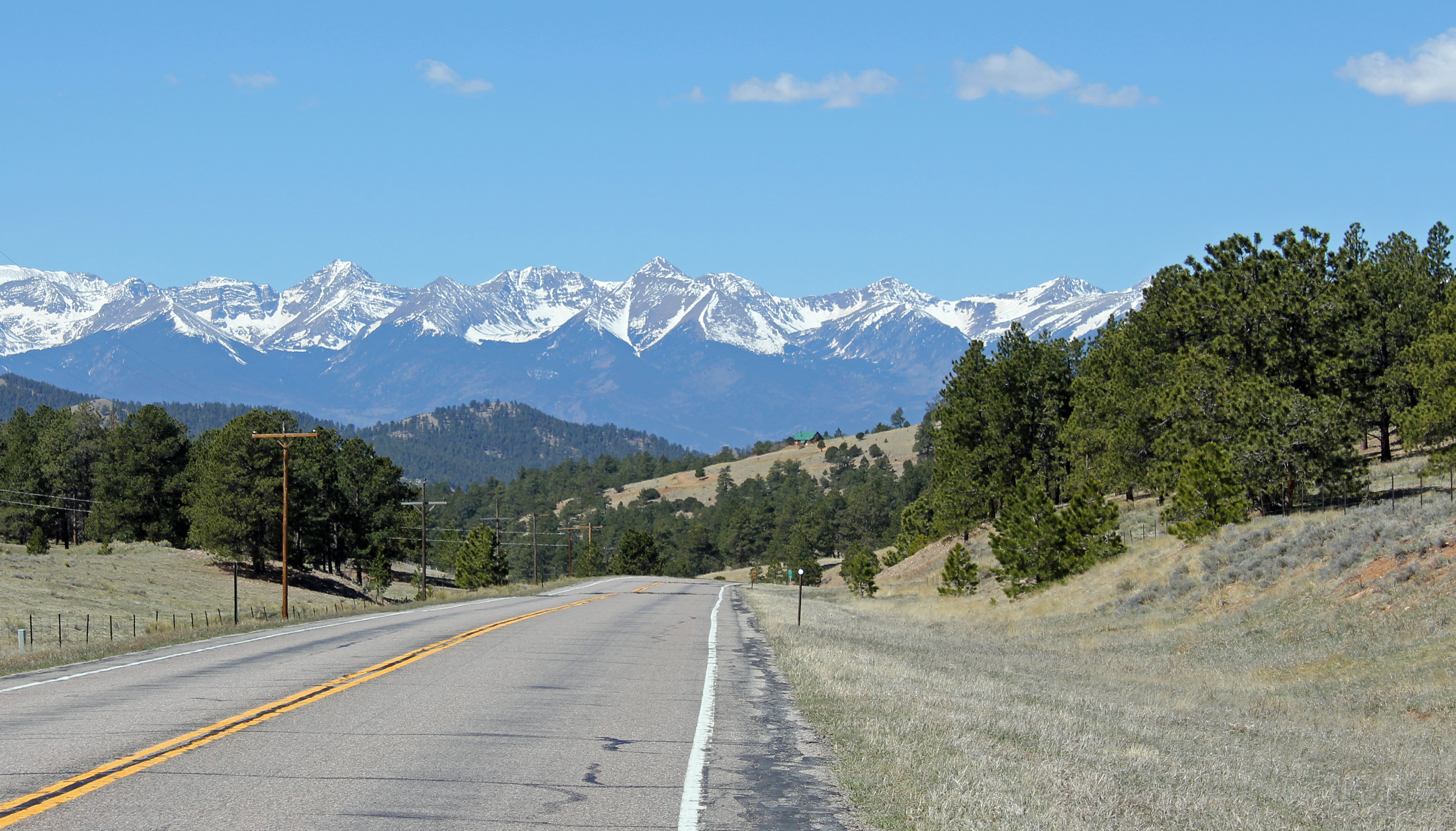
- Looking west towards the Sangre de Cristo Mountains from the top of the pass.
- Interactive map of Hardscrabble Pass
- Elevation: 9,085 ft (2,769 m)
- Traversed by: State Highway 96

Third Approach
- Location: Custer County, Colorado, United States
- Coordinates: 38°09′52″N 105°17′00″W

Hardscrabble Pass (9,085 ft; 2,769 m) is a mountain pass in South-Central Colorado (USA). It lies between the Wet Mountain Valley to the west and the valley of the Arkansas River to the east. The pass traverses the Wet Mountains. State Highway 96 runs over the pass, linking the towns of Wetmore to the east and Westcliffe to the west.

The pass forms part of the Frontier Pathways Scenic and Historic Byway. Hardscrabble Pass goes through the San Isabel National Forest.
