= Lake Isabel (Colorado) =

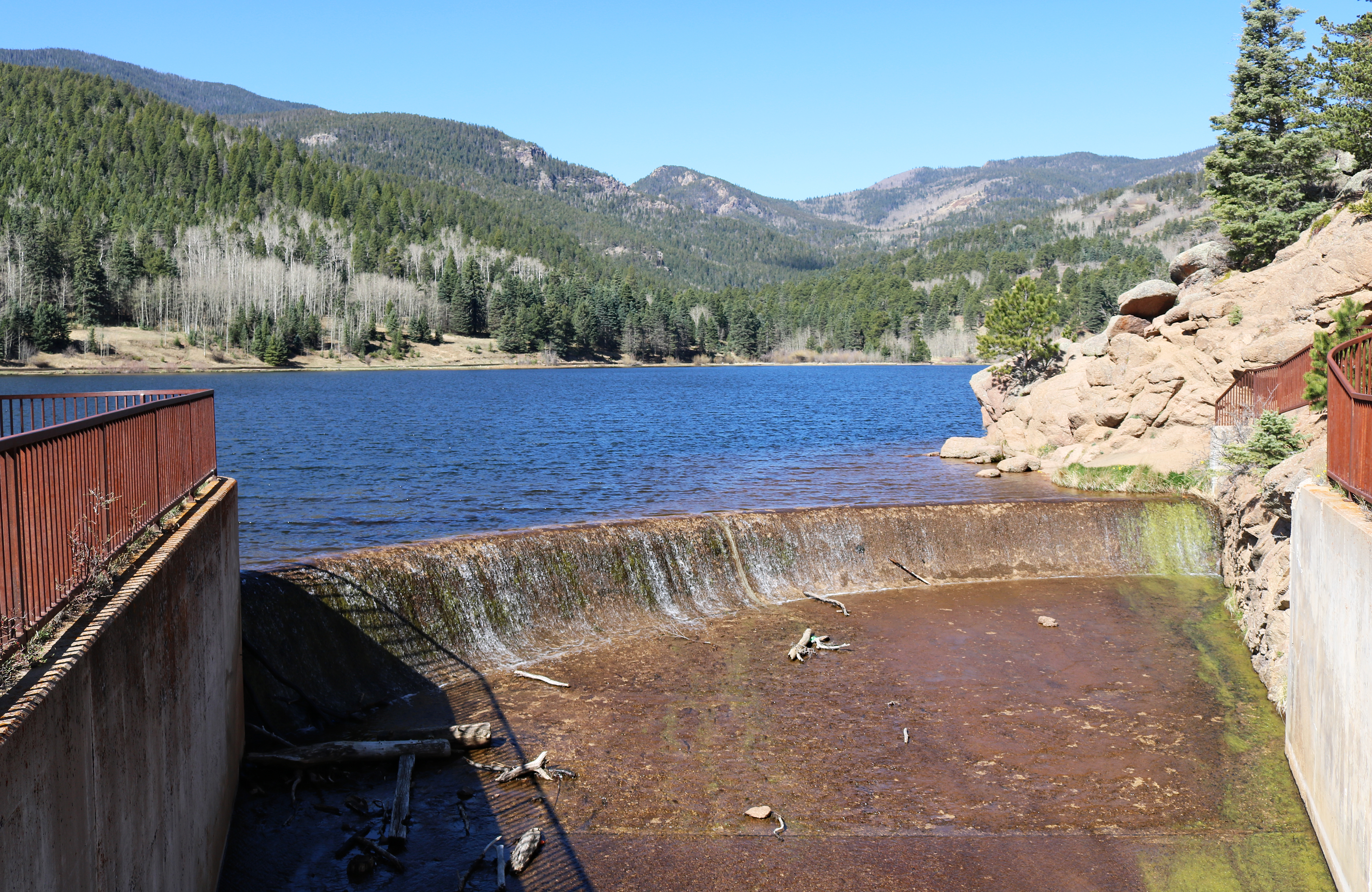
- The lake and spillway in 2018.

- Location in Colorado
- Location: Pueblo County and Custer County, Colorado
- Coordinates: 37°59′05″N 105°03′09″W
- Type: reservoir
- Primary inflows: Saint Charles River
- Primary outflows: Saint Charles River, evaporation
- Basin countries: United States
- Surface area: 35.7 acres (14.4 ha)
- Water volume: 969.8 acre-feet (1,196,200 cubic meters)
- Surface elevation: 2,585 meters (8,481 feet)
- Frozen: The lake freezes in winter and ice-fishing is possible.

Lake Isabel is a reservoir located in the San Isabel National Forest in Pueblo and Custer counties, in Colorado, United States. The lake is in the Wet Mountains. The lake is open to fishing year round and is regularly stocked by Colorado Parks and Wildlife. Available activities include fishing, hiking, camping and sledding in the winter.

The community of San Isabel lies on the north side of the lake, in Custer County. The border between Pueblo and Custer counties runs north–south through the east side of the lake, such that most of the dam is in Pueblo County (on the east side), and most of the reservoir itself is in Custer County (on the west side).

== History ==
The earthen dam and reservoir were built in the 1930s to store water for the CF&I Steel plant in Pueblo. Now the lake and the area surrounding it are managed by the United States Forest Service as the Lake Isabel Recreation Area.
