= Colorado State Highway 165 =

State highway in Colorado, United States

State Highway 165
- SH 165 highlighted in red

Route information
- Maintained by CDOT
- Length: 36.894 mi (59.375 km)

Major junctions
- West end: SH 96 east of Silver Cliff
- SH 78 near San Isabel
- East end: I-25 / US 85 / US 87 near Colorado City

Location
- Country: United States
- State: Colorado
- Counties: Custer, Pueblo

Highway system
- Colorado State Highway System; Interstate; US; State; Scenic
← US 160	→ SH 167

State Highway 165 (SH 165) is a 36.894-mile (59.375 km) state highway in southern Colorado. SH 165's western terminus is at SH 96 east of Silver Cliff, and the eastern terminus is at Interstate 25 (I-25), U.S. Route 85 (US 85) and US 87 near Colorado City.

== Route description ==
SH 165 begins in the west at a junction with SH 96 roughly fifteen miles east of Silver Cliff. From there the road proceeds to the southeast through portions of San Isabel National Forest. One notable attraction on the route is Bishop Castle, about 12 miles (19 km) south of SH 96.

After Fairview, the highway meets the southwest end of SH 78 near San Isabel, through which SH 165 also passes. After San Isabel, the highway turns more nearly easterly and passes out of the national forest and though Rye. The route continues east through Colorado City before reaching its eastern terminus at exit 74 of I-25.

The highway forms part of the Frontier Pathways Scenic and Historic Byway.

== Major intersections ==
County	Location	mi	km	Destinations	Notes
Custer		0.000	0.000	SH 96 – Westcliffe, Pueblo	Western terminus
Custer	Greenhill Divide	15.310	24.639	SH 78 east – Beulah	Western terminus of SH 78
Pueblo		36.894	59.375	I-25 / US 85 / US 87 – Pueblo, Trinidad	Eastern terminus; I-25 exit 74
1.000 mi = 1.609 km; 1.000 km = 0.621 mi
