= Greenhill Divide =

- Location within Colorado
- Elevation: 9,347 feet (2,849 m)
- Traversed by: Colorado State Highway 165

Third Approach
- Location: Custer County, Colorado, USA
- Coordinates: 38°01′42″N 105°04′51″W
- Topo map: Saint Charles Peak

Greenhill Divide is a wind gap located in the San Isabel National Forest in the U.S. state of Colorado. It is located by the intersection of Colorado State Highway 165 and Colorado State Highway 78.
