= Charles Conklin =

American politician from Colorado

Charles R. Conklin

Speaker of the Colorado House of Representatives
- In office 1957–1960
- Preceded by: David A. Hamil
- Succeeded by: Albert J. Tomsic

Member of the Colorado House of Representatives from the Delta district
- In office 1954–1960

Personal details
- Born: June 23, 1920 Delta, Colorado
- Died: November 16, 1996 (aged 76) Honolulu, Hawaii
- Party: Democratic
- Education: Harvard College (BA); Harvard Law School (LLB)

Charles R. Conklin (June 23, 1920 – November 16, 1996) was an American politician who served in the Colorado House of Representatives from the Delta district from 1954 to 1960. He served as Speaker of the Colorado House of Representatives from 1957 to 1960.
