= Punkin Center, Colorado =

Unincorporated community in Lincoln County, CO, USA

- Unincorporated community
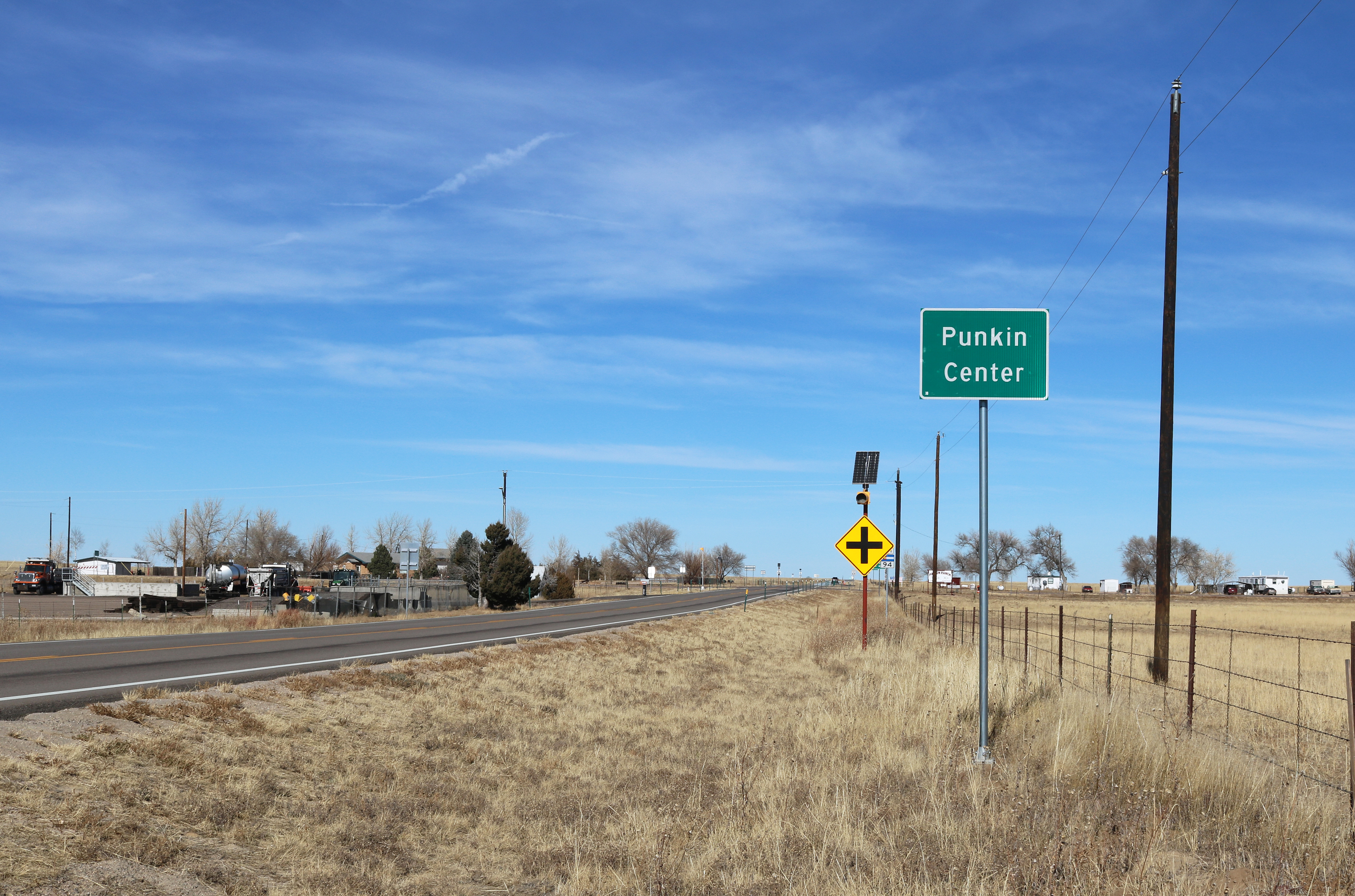
- Looking north along State Highway 71 from a point south of its intersection with State Highway 94 (2021)

- Location within Colorado Location within the United States
- Coordinates: 38°51′07″N 103°42′02″W
- Country: United States
- State: Colorado
- County: Lincoln
- Elevation: 5,364 ft (1,635 m)
- Time zone: UTC−7 (MST)
  - Summer (DST): UTC−6 (MDT)
- ZIP Code: 81063 (Ordway), 80821 (Hugo)
- Area code: 719
- GNIS ID: 195180

Punkin Center is an unincorporated community in Lincoln County, Colorado, United States, located at the junction of State Highway 94 and State Highway 71.

== History ==
John Stevens built the first store at the farmers crossroads in 1920. He painted each new building a pumpkin color, inspiring the name. Everything burned in the 1950s.

The Post Offices at Hugo (ZIP Code 80821) and Ordway (ZIP 81063) serve Punkin Center postal addresses.

There is a communication tower near the intersection of the highways, and a larger communication tower about 3 miles (4.8 km) southwest of the intersection.

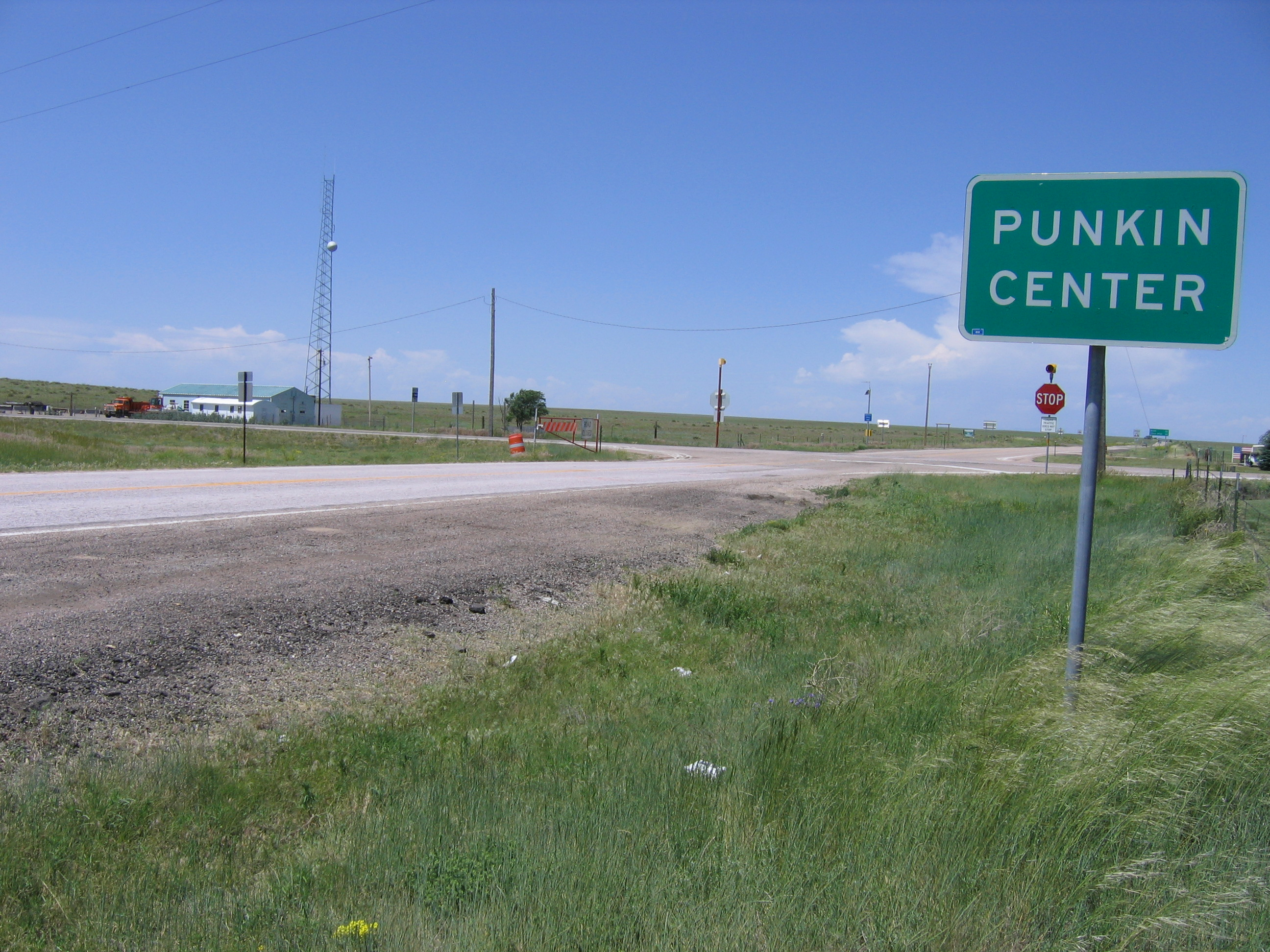
Looking west on Highway 94 (2007)
