= Lathrop State Park =

State park in Huerfano County, Colorado

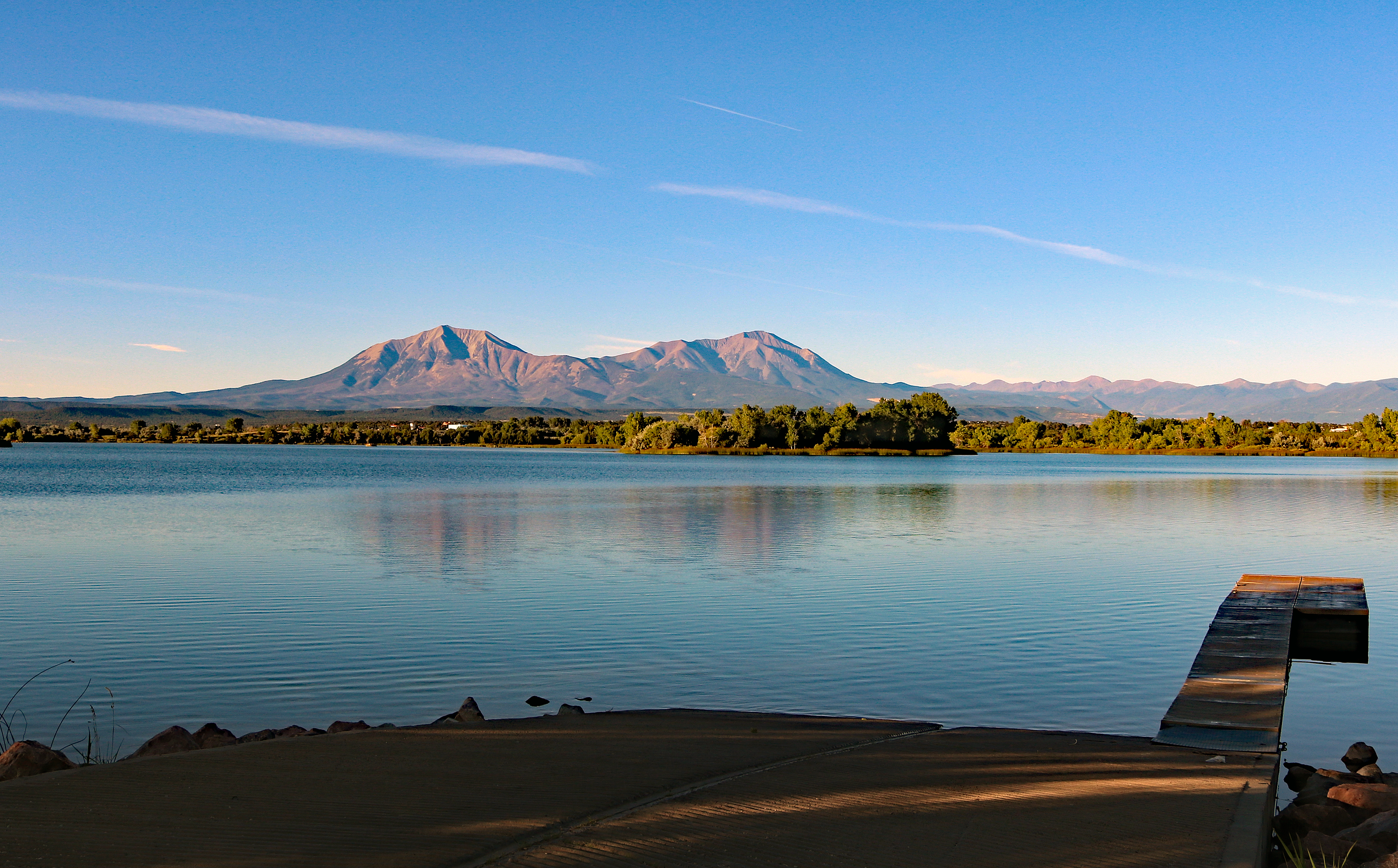
- Horseshoe Lake and the Spanish Peaks

- Location within Colorado
- Location: Huerfano County, Colorado, U.S.
- Nearest city: Walsenburg, Colorado
- Coordinates: 37°36′10″N 104°49′59″W
- Area: 1,594 acres (6.45 km^{2})
- Established: 1962
- Named for: Harold Lathrop
- Visitors: 121,000 (in 2023)
- Governing body: Colorado Parks and Wildlife

Lathrop State Park is a Colorado state park located 3 miles (4.8 km) west of Walsenburg. The state purchased the property in 1962 and opened Colorado's first state park here later that same year. It is named after Harold Lathrop, the first director of state parks. The park features two lakes, Martin Lake and Horseshoe Lake, that offer fishing for tiger muskie (46-inch, 25-pound examples have been caught here), rainbow trout, bass, catfish, northern pike, blue gill, saugeye, and wipers.

== Activities ==
In addition to fishing, the park also offers a beach, boating, water skiing, wind surfing, jet skiing, picnicking, hiking, wildlife viewing, camping, and a nine-hole golf course.

=== Golf course ===
Lathrop is the only Colorado state park with its own golf course. The Walsenburg Golf Course was founded in 1965 and after two years of construction opened in 1967. It was built by 50 Walsenburg citizens and many local volunteers in a public/private partnership. The course's restaurant/lounge overlooks the lakes and the National Natural Landmark Spanish Peaks.

=== Mountain bike trails ===
In 2024, the park added 4.5 miles (7.2 kilometers) of mountain bike trails. The dirt trails, which are also open to hikers, are in a 160-acre (65-hectare) parcel of land on the park's north side. The park also allows class 1 and 2 e-bikes to use the trails.

== Visitors ==
The park reported about 121,000 visitors in 2023.
