= Albert J. Tomsic =

American politician and attorney

Speaker of the Colorado House of Representatives
- In office January 1961 – January 1963
- Preceded by: Charles Conklin
- Succeeded by: John D. Vanderhoof

Member of the Colorado House of Representatives from the Huerfano County district
- In office January 1953 – January 1963
- Preceded by: J. M. McMath
- Succeeded by: Star Caywood

Personal details
- Born: Albert Jack Tomsic; April 26, 1925 Delagua, Colorado
- Died: July 7, 2012 (aged 87) Walsenburg, Colorado
- Party: Democratic
- Spouse: Patricia Tomsic
- Children: One son, one daughter
- Education: University of Colorado Boulder; University of Colorado Law School
- Profession: Attorney judge

Albert J. Tomsic (April 26, 1925 – July 7, 2012) was an attorney and Democratic member of the Colorado House of Representatives. He served five terms in the State House, from 1953 to 1963. During his last term, he served as Speaker of the House. Following his State House service, from 1965 to 1986, he worked as a district court judge for Colorado's Third Judicial District in Walsenburg.

== Early life and career ==
Born in 1925 in the coal mining town of Delagua, now a ghost town, Tomsic attended elementary and high school in Walsenburg. He served in the United States Army Air Corps from 1943 to 1946. Following his military service, he attended the University of Colorado Boulder, graduating with a bachelor's degree in 1948. He then attended the University of Colorado Law School, graduating in 1951. Following law school, he opened a law office in Walsenburg. He worked as the county attorney for Huerfano County from 1957 to 1964 and in 1958 as an attorney for Colorado's Third Judicial District. Tomsic served from 1965 to 1985 as a judge in the Third Judicial District.

== Elections ==
Tomsic was first elected to the Colorado house of Representatives in 1952 and sworn in in 1953. He was re-elected four times, serving a total of ten years. In 1962, he ran for U.S. Congress, seeking to represent Colorado's 3rd congressional district. He was unopposed in the Democratic primary election. In the general election, he was defeated by Republican J. Edgar Chenoweth.

== House leadership positions ==
From 1957 to 1958, Tomsic served as the House Majority Leader, the first time the position was held by a Democrat in twenty years. He served as Speaker of the Colorado House of Representatives from 1961 to 1963.

== Personal life and death ==
Tomsic was married to Patricia Tomsic for 57 years. Together, they had one son and one daughter. He died on July 7, 2012, aged 87.
