= San Isabel, Colorado =

Unincorporated community in Custer County, CO, USA

- Unincorporated community
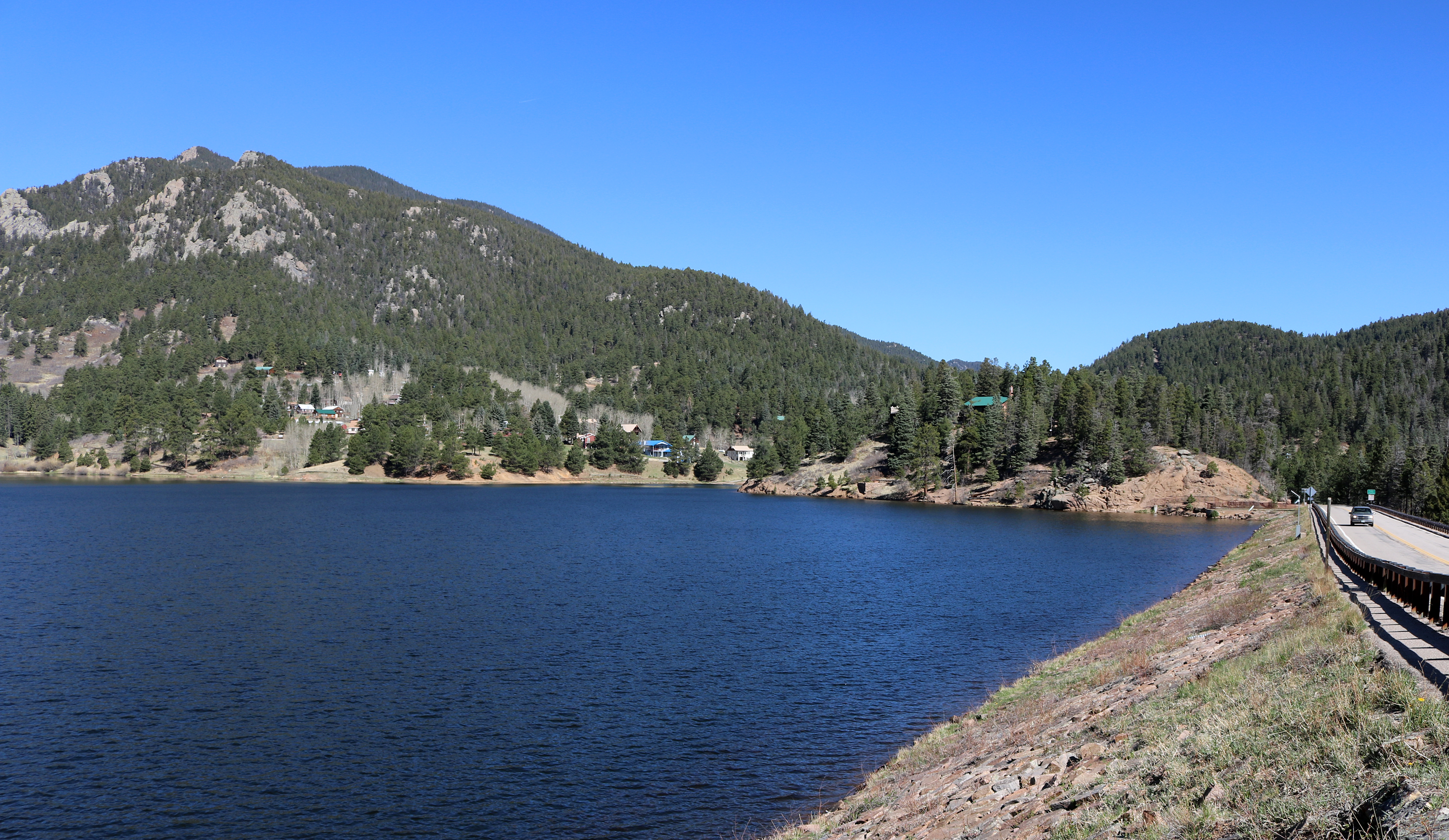
- San Isabel, with Lake Isabel in the foreground.

- Location within the state of Colorado
- Coordinates: 37°59′15″N 105°03′16″W
- Country: United States
- State: Colorado
- County: Custer
- Elevation: 8,514 ft (2,595 m)
- Time zone: UTC-7 (MST)
  - Summer (DST): UTC-6 (MDT)
- ZIP code: 81069
- GNIS feature ID: 192524

San Isabel is an unincorporated community in Custer County, Colorado, United States. The town is located on the north side of Lake Isabel and alongside Colorado State Highway 165. Businesses in town cater to visitors to the adjacent Lake Isabel Recreation Area.

== Geography ==
San Isabel is located in Colorado's Wet Mountains and is surrounded by the San Isabel National Forest.
