= Colorado State Highway 78 =

State highway in Colorado, United States

State Highway 78
- SH 78 highlighted in red

Route information
- Maintained by CDOT
- Length: 33.272 mi (53.546 km)

Major junctions
- West end: SH 165 at Greenhill Divide
- East end: SH 45 in Pueblo

Location
- Country: United States
- State: Colorado
- Counties: Custer, Pueblo

Highway system
- Colorado State Highway System; Interstate; US; State; Scenic
| ← SH 75 | → SH 79 |

State Highway 78 (SH 78) is a state highway connecting Pueblo to the town of Beulah and the San Isabel National Forest. The western terminus is at SH 165 at Greenhill Divide in the San Isabel National Forest. and the eastern terminus is at SH 45 in Pueblo.

== Route description ==
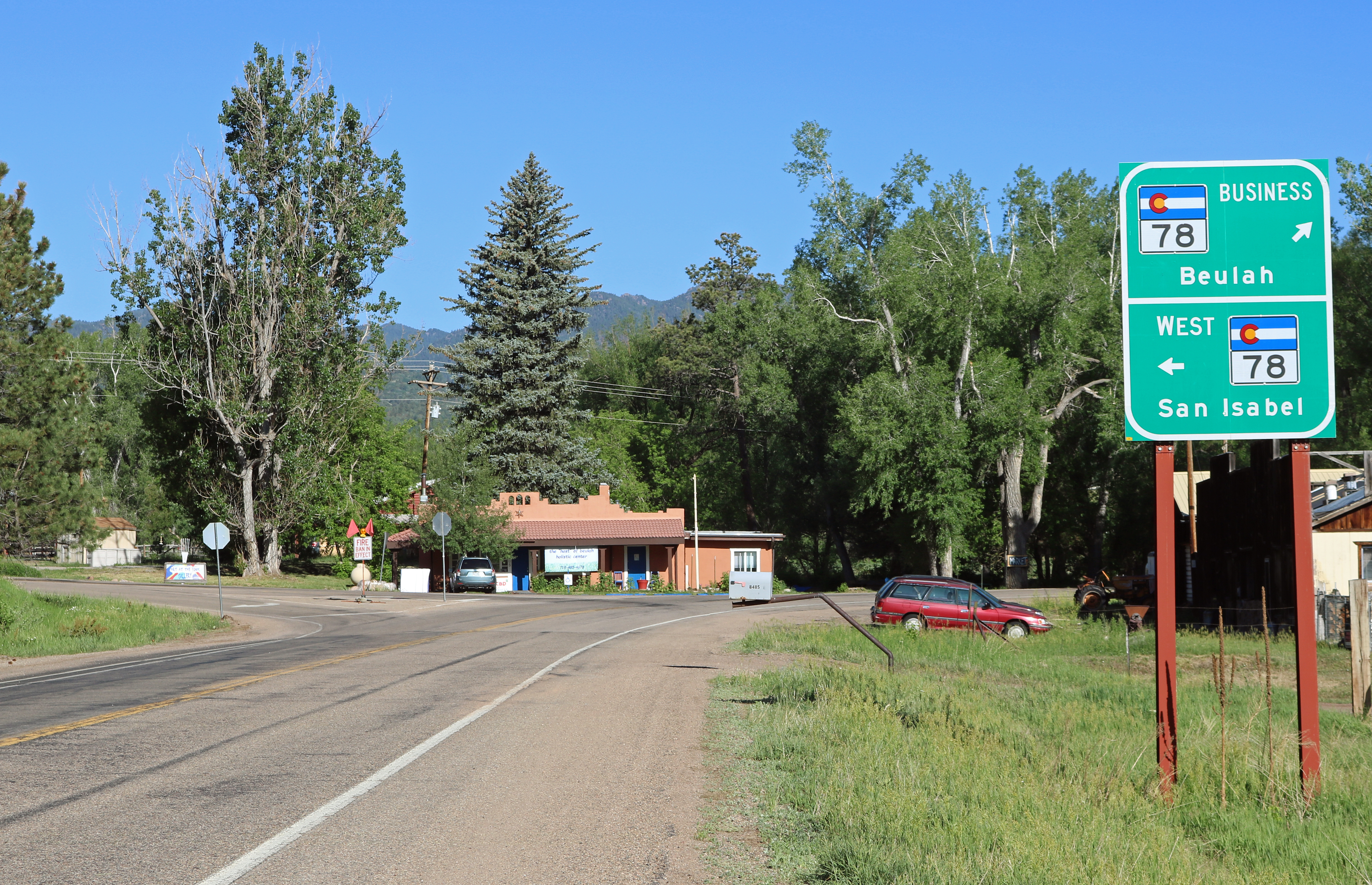
The highway in Beulah where it splits

SH 78 runs 33.2 miles (53.4 km), starting at a junction with SH 165 at Greenhill Divide in the San Isabel National Forest, and ending at a junction with SH 45 in Pueblo. A short spur route, marked as SH 78 Bus. runs 1.5 miles (2.4 km) from the main highway in Beulah Valley, and ending at the intersection of Grand and Pennsylvania avenues in Beulah.

== Major intersections ==
| County | Location | mi | km | Destinations | Notes |
|---|---|---|---|---|---|
| Custer | Greenhill Divide | 0.000 | 0.000 | SH 165 | Western terminus |
| Pueblo | Beulah Valley | 12.710 | 20.455 | SH 78 Bus. west – Beulah | Eastern terminus of SH 78 Bus. |
| Pueblo | Pueblo | 33.273 | 53.548 | SH 45 | Eastern terminus |
1.000 mi = 1.609 km; 1.000 km = 0.621 mi

== Related route ==
State Highway 78 Business
- Location: Beulah Valley–Beulah
- Length: 1.493 mi (2.403 km)

Colorado State Highway 78 Business (SH 78 Bus.) is a 1.493-mile-long (2.403 km) north–south state highway in the U.S. state of Colorado. SH 78 Bus.'s eastern terminus is at SH 78 in Beulah Valley, and the western terminus is at County Route 225 (CR 225) in Beulah. SH 78 Bus. mainly serves as a connector route between Beulah and the main SH 78

The entire route is in Pueblo County.

| Location | mi | km | Destinations | Notes |
|---|---|---|---|---|
| Beulah Valley | 0.000 | 0.000 | SH 78 | Eastern terminus |
| Beulah | 1.493 | 2.403 | CR 225 (Central Avenue) | Western terminus |
1.000 mi = 1.609 km; 1.000 km = 0.621 mi
