= Bishop Castle =

Roadside attraction near Pueblo, Colorado, US

Coordinates: 38°3′41.22″N 105°5′39.87″W

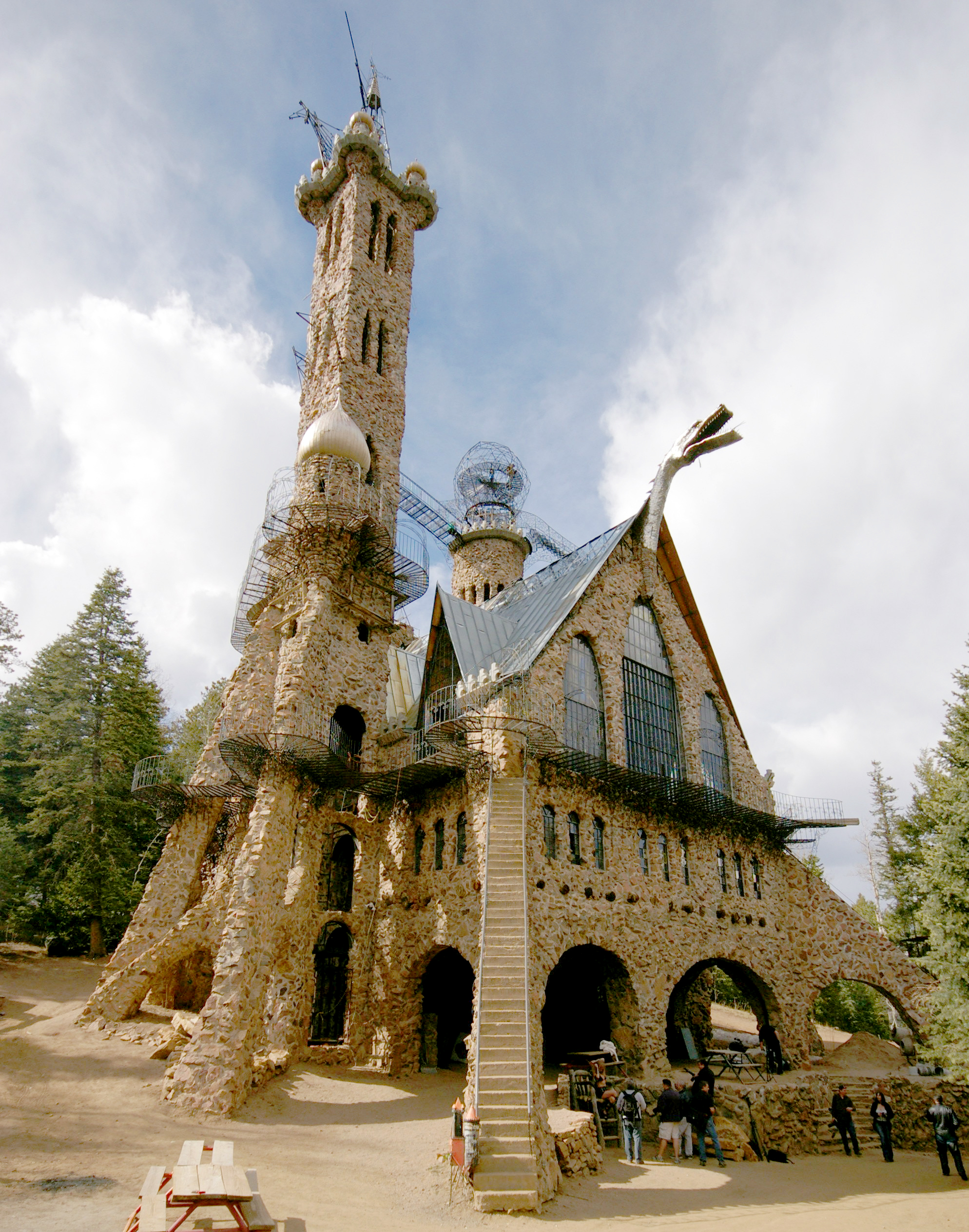
The front half of Bishop Castle from the south. The main tower is over 160 ft (49 m) tall.

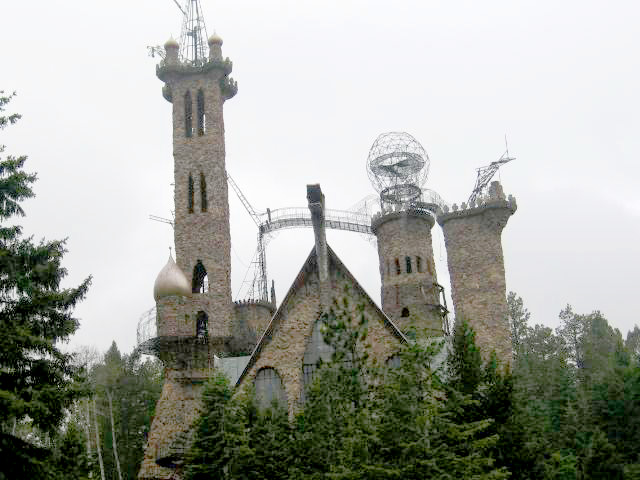
The front of the castle with view of towers.

Bishop Castle is an "elaborate and intricate" "one-man project" named after its constructor, the late Jim Bishop, that has become a roadside attraction in central Colorado.

The "castle" is located in south central Colorado, on State Highway 165, in the Wet Mountains of Southern Colorado, in the San Isabel National Forest, southwest of Pueblo, Colorado.

== Overview ==
James Roland "Jim" Bishop was born in Honolulu in 1944. He moved to Colorado at a young age. Him and his wife raised four children, including a son named Dan. Bishop bought the land for the site for $1,250 when he was 15, and construction on what was originally intended to be a family project to build a cottage started in 1969. When Bishop got a water tower he decided to cover it with rocks. Several neighbors said it reminded them of a castle and Bishop noted it looked like a turret. Bishop took this into consideration and soon began building.

In 1988, Bishop's third child, four year old Roy was killed in a logging accident at the castle site. When Bishop was asked in 2016 why he continued to build the castle, he replied, "Well, what am I gonna run to?! He loved this place."

According to Roadsideamerica, "for most" of the 40 years he had worked on the castle "Bishop was engaged in a running battle with Washington bureaucrats over the rocks that he used", which came from the National Forest surrounding his property. "Bishop felt that they were his for the taking, the government wanted to charge him per truckload." That dispute was settled. In 1996, he was challenged by the local and state government over unsanctioned road signs that pointed to the site. They settled the dispute by issuing official road signs.

The site has become a tourist attraction. RoadsideAmerica.com devoted a chapter to the castle and rated it "major fun" and describing it as, "one man's massive-obsessive labor of medieval fantasy construction". But it also issued a "parent's alert", warning potential visitors that Jim Bishop was "a tough-talking man with strong, extreme beliefs, and sometimes he expresses them bluntly and loudly. If you and your children want to avoid potentially offensive rants (involving politics), you may want to steer clear."

In the winter of 2014–15 a dispute developed over control of the castle after Jim Bishop and his wife Phoebe were both diagnosed with cancer, and David Merrill, who Jim "considered a friend", was made a trustee of Bishop Castle. According to Westword.com website, Merrill turned the site into "Castle Church—for the Redemption", according to the Custer County Clerk and Recorder's Office. The Bishops "spent $20,000 trying to get a clear title to Bishop Castle, and to get Merrill's name off all paperwork." This was resolved with Merrill no longer on the paperwork.

Drone views of the castle in 2019.

A song about the castle, called "Fire Breathing Dragon", is featured on the 2017 album The Castle Builder by English musician Kid Carpet.

On March 28, 2018, a fire occurred on the Bishop Castle property, destroying the gift shop and a guest house. The fire is speculated to have been caused by an electrical fault. It did not damage the castle itself (which is mostly made of stone). Despite the fire, the attraction re-opened to the public later that week, while being supported with donations and volunteer labor.

Jim Bishop died on November 21, 2024, in Pueblo, Colorado, at the age of 80. His son Dan took over as the castle's caretaker.

On June 29, 2026, Bishop Castle was evacuated due to the Aspen Acres Fire but emerged almost entirely unscathed and re-opened to visitors on Aug 7, 2026.

=== Gallery ===
Views of Bishop Castle
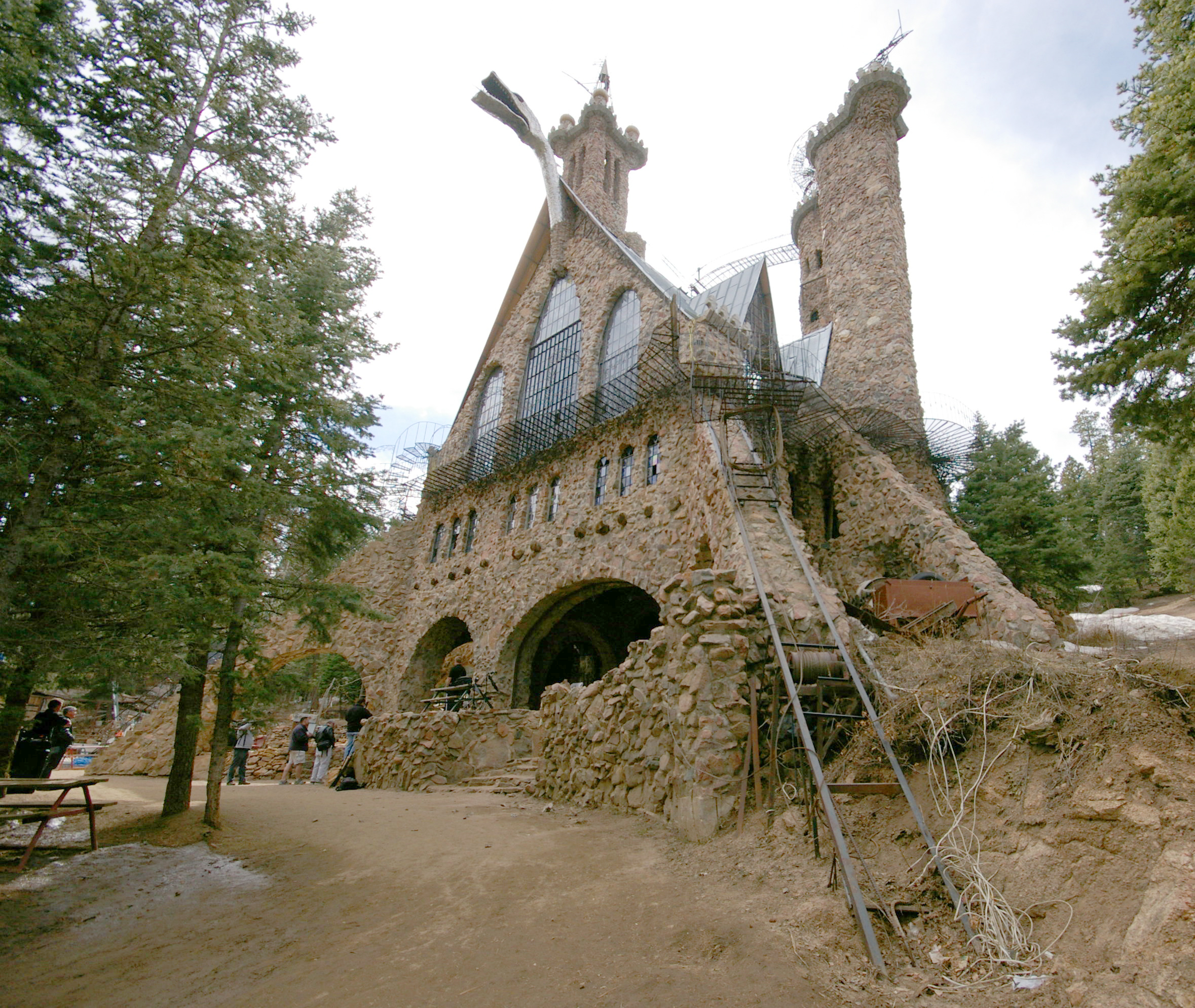
The front half of Bishop Castle from the north. The main tower is over 160 ft (49 m) tall.

Arched windows with a mountain view inside Bishop Castle.

A rocky twist and turn along a soaring tower of Bishop Castle.

A rubble pile outside Bishop Castle
