= Beulah, Colorado =

Unincorporated community in Pueblo County, Colorado, United States

- Unincorporated community
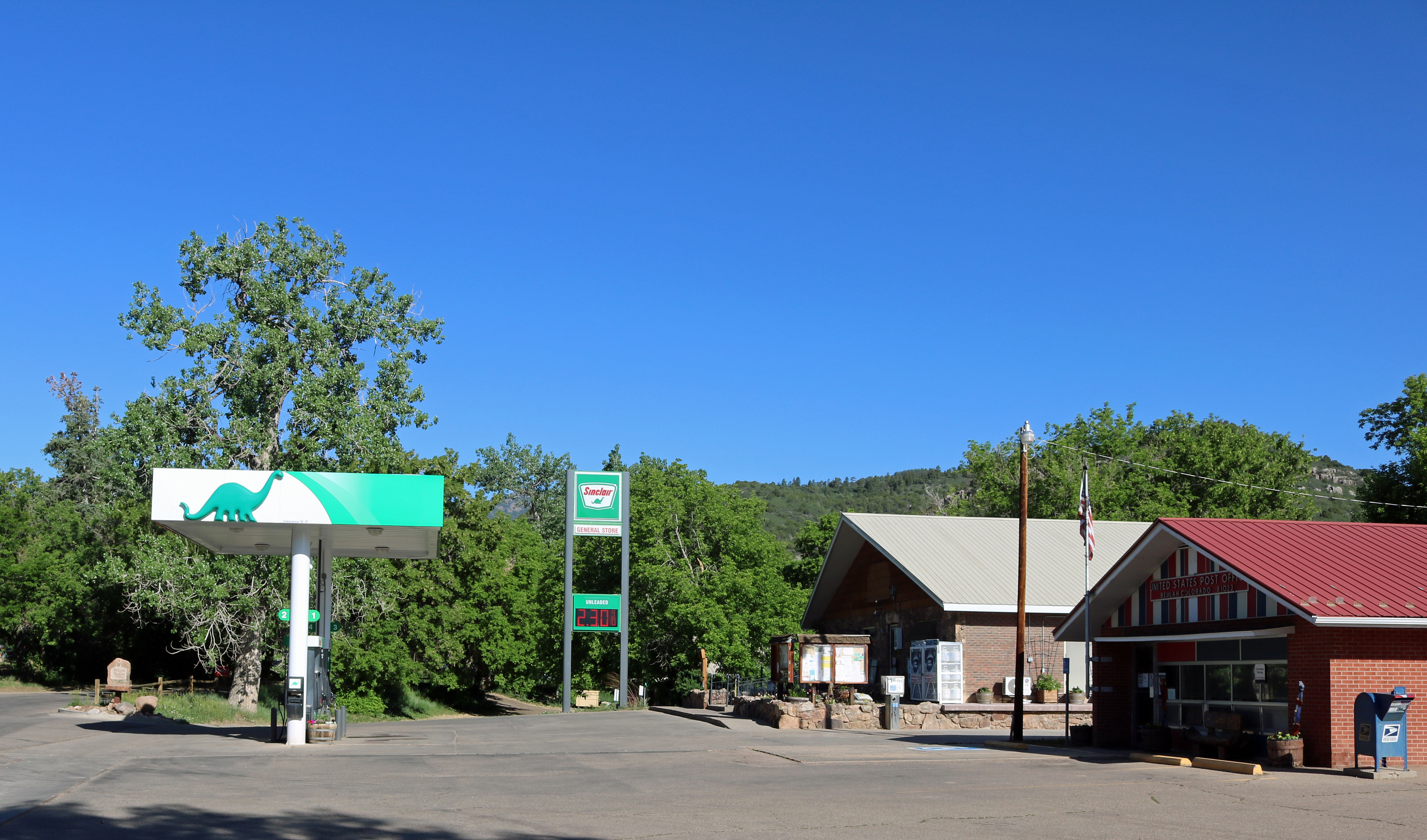
- Beulah's gas station, general store, and post office

- Location of Beulah, Colorado. Beulah (Colorado)
- Coordinates: 38°04′30″N 104°59′12″W
- Country: United States
- State: Colorado
- County: Pueblo
- Settled: 1862

Government
  - Type: Unincorporated community
  - Body: Pueblo County
- Elevation: 6,382 ft (1,945 m)
- Time zone: UTC−07:00 (MST)
  - Summer (DST): UTC−06:00 (MDT)
- ZIP Code: 81023
- Area code: 719
- GNIS pop ID: 204803
- FIPS code: FIPS 08 06602

Beulah is an unincorporated community and a post office located within the Beulah Valley census-designated place in Pueblo County, Colorado, United States. The Beulah Post Office has the ZIP code 81023. Beulah is a part of the Beulah Valley CDP (census-designated place). Beulah lies along State Highway 78 about 21 miles southwest of Pueblo, in the foothills of the Wet Mountains.

== History ==
The town of Mace's Hole was settled in 1862. The town was named for Juan Maes, anglicized to "Mace," a bandit who used the valley for a hideout. The Mace's Hole, Colorado Territory, post office opened on April 23, 1873, and Colorado became a state on August 1, 1876. A local preacher took umbrage at the town's name and suggested the biblical name Beulah as a more wholesome alternative. The Mace's Hole post office was renamed Beulah on October 25, 1876. The name is a reference to Isaiah 62:4; it comes from the Hebrew for "married."

In late June to Mid-July, Beulah was significantly impacted by the Aspen Acres Fire, making the area surrounding it unrecognizable. However, heroic firefighting helped save core infrastructure, like the local school and its town hall. In total, over more than 400+ buildings were with some type of damage or completely burned down. One of Beulah's attractions, the Horseshoe Lodge at Beulah Mountain Park was completely totaled and leveled.

== Geography and climate ==
Beulah lies within a valley bordered by the Wet Mountains to the west, Mt. Signal to the south and southeast, and a prominent ridge that forms the north through east sides of the valley. Elevations within the open valley itself range from about 6,150 to 7,100 feet (1,875 to 2,165 m.) Four creeks, North Creek, Middle Creek, Squirrel Creek, and South Creek flow through the valley. They all converge as they flow eastward; eventually combining into one at the valley's eastern end as the North St. Charles River, which flows into the St. Charles River southeast of Beulah and drains into the Arkansas River just west of Vineland.

Due to its location along the east-facing foothills of the Wet Mountains, Beulah is prone to significant orographic enhancement of precipitation in the form of heavy cold-season snowfall as well as significant rain in warm months mostly (in the latter case) due to effects of the North American Monsoon. Per the Köppen climate classification, Beulah has a humid continental climate (Dfb) but closely borders on up to four other subcategories depending on temperature and precipitation patterns. The average temperature in July is 71.0 °F (21.7 °C), putting it just below the 22 °C threshold for a Dfa designation. December and January average just below freezing (31.4 °F); by many American interpretations of the Köppen climate system this makes it just barely too cold to qualify as a Cfa or Cfb humid subtropical or subtropical highland climate, though such climates do exist especially to the immediate south and southeast in areas including the neighboring towns at similar elevations of Rye and Colorado City. Per the Trewartha climate classification system, Beulah clearly falls into class D (Dcb or Dcbo) as only five months of the year have a mean temperature above 10 °C and like Köppen is too wet to be classified as semi-arid or steppe (Köppen BSk) found over the vast majority of eastern Colorado and the High Plains.

Summers are mild with cool nights; daily minimum temperatures at or above 60 °F occur on only about six days per year. High temperatures of 90 °F or higher occur on about 33 days. The growing season is about 140 days in length from the first half of May until the end of September. Winters are mild and can feature days with temperatures exceeding 70 °F - the most recent of which occurred February 6, 2015 (high of 72 °F) - but periods of several consecutive days below freezing can occur and snow can fall from September through late May. Thunderstorms are common in warm months, averaging 42 days per year; hail falls on about five days. Severe thunderstorms can affect the valley, mostly with large hail (notably June 20, 2001, with hail to over two inches in diameter falling in the valley) but tornadoes have been sighted near the valley, especially in the moist months of July and August. As of June 2015 no tornado has directly struck Beulah itself.

The record high in Beulah is 101 °F, set June 26, 1994 and tied August 2, 2008. The record low is −18 °F, set on February 2, 2011; though colder temps are much more likely from lower creek-bottom locations within the valley. Annual average precipitation is about 19.3 inches (580 mm) while average yearly/seasonal snowfall is about 120 inches (305 cm.)

== Gallery ==
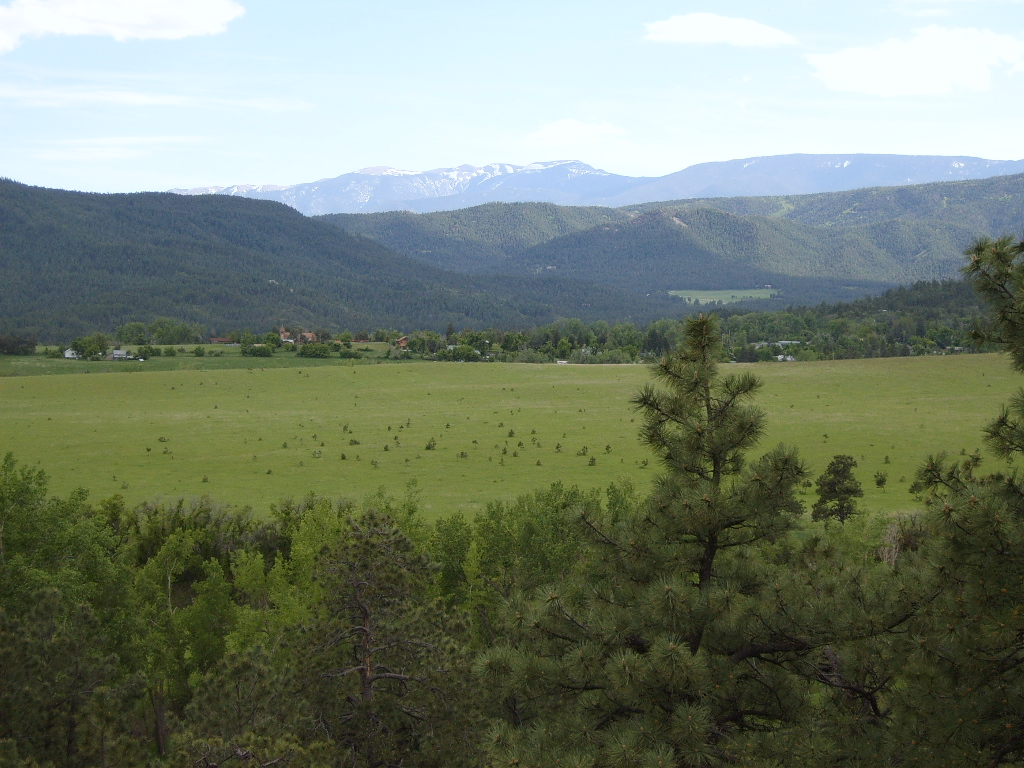
A picture of the town taken from the south facing mountain.

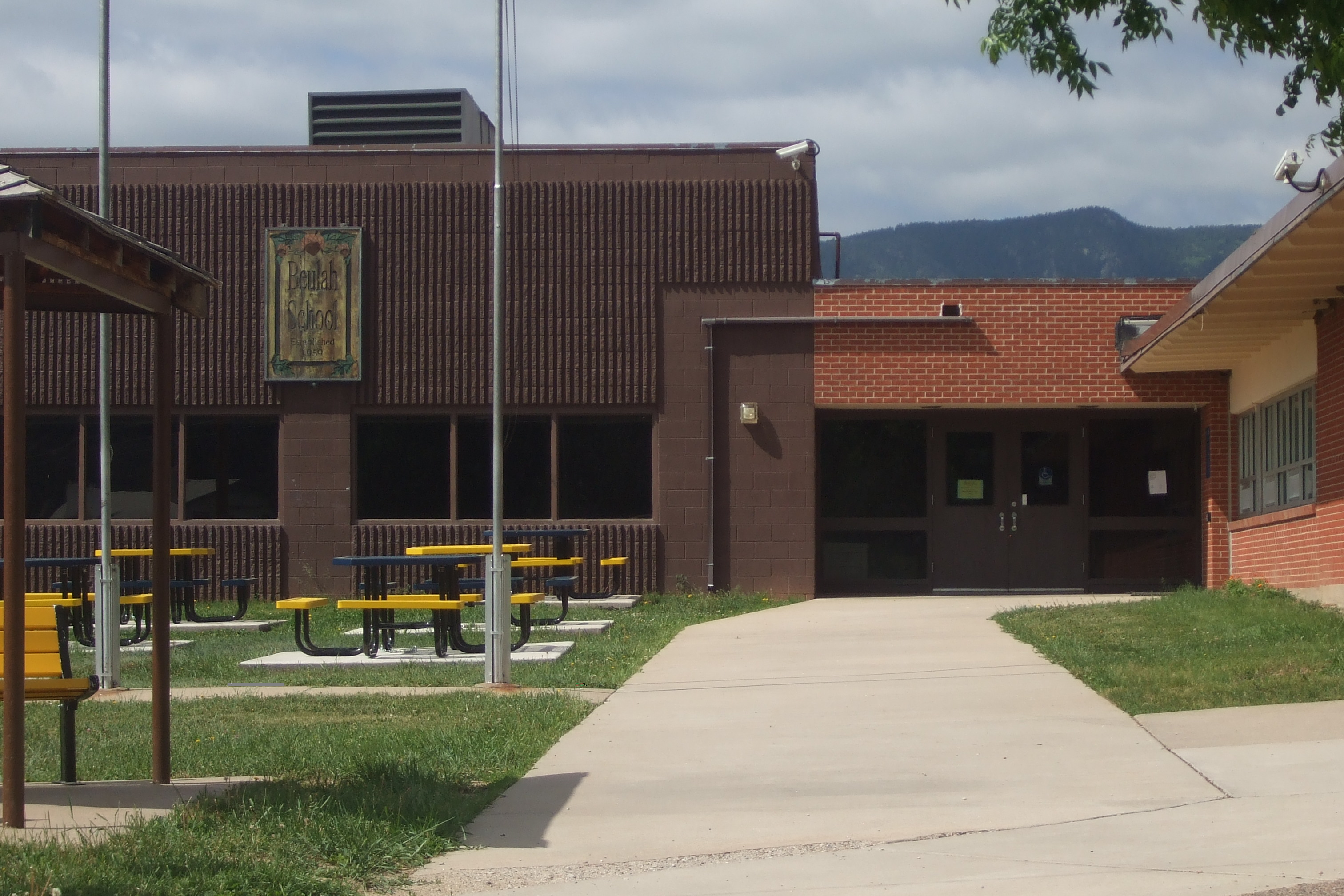
The local K-8 magnet school, Beulah School of Natural Sciences.

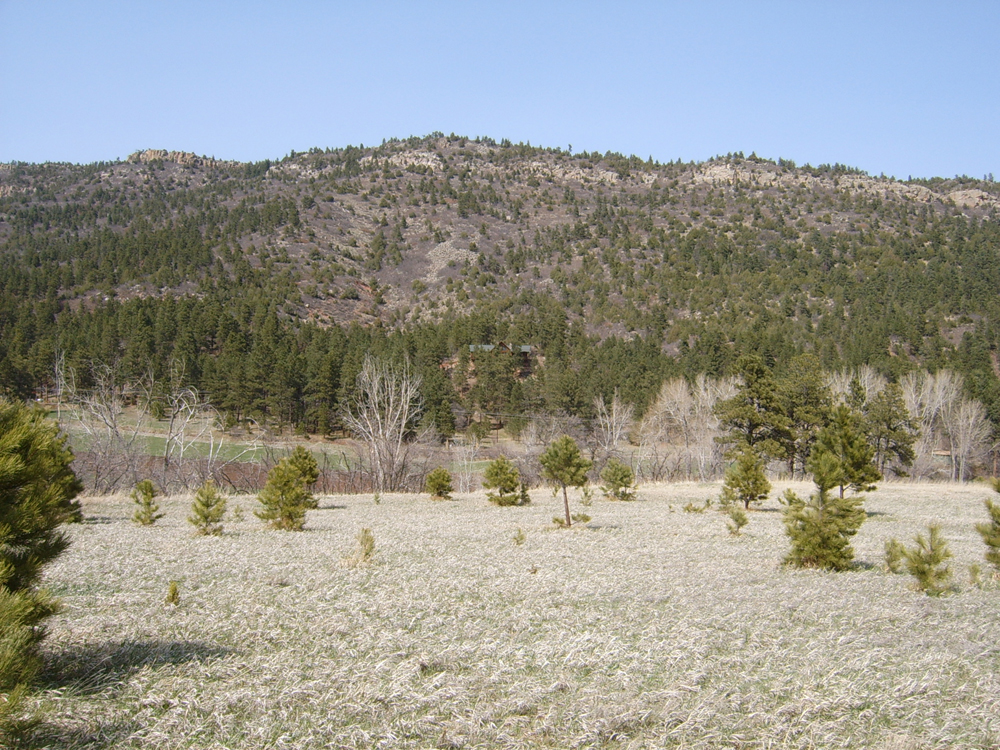
The Northcreek mountain range.

== See also ==
- List of post offices in Colorado
- Pueblo, CO Metropolitan Statistical Area
