= Walsenburg, Colorado =

City in Colorado, United States

Walsenburg, Colorado La Plaza de los Leones (Plaza of the Leons)
- Statutory City
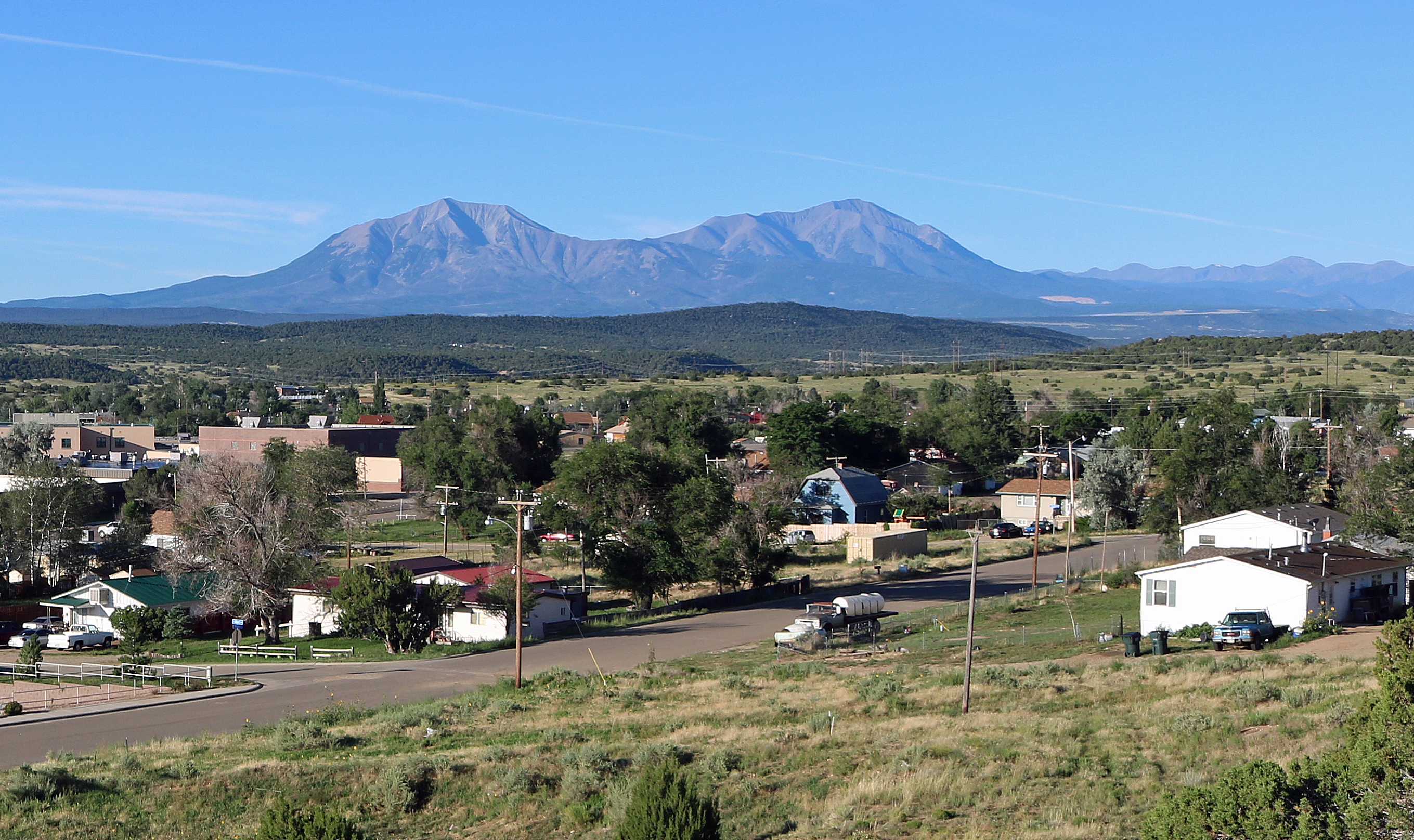
- Walsenburg with the Spanish Peaks in the background.

- Location of the City of Walsenburg in Huerfano County, Colorado
- Coordinates: 37°37′36″N 104°46′44″W
- Country: United States
- State: Colorado
- County: Huerfano County
- City: Walsenburg
- <-- Incorporated (town) -->: 1873
- Incorporated: June 16, 1873
- Named for: Fred Walsen

Government
  - Type: Statutory City
  - Mayor: Gary M. Vezzani
  - City administrator: Roger Tinklenberg

Area
  - Total: 2.99 sq mi (7.74 km^{2})
  - Land: 2.99 sq mi (7.74 km^{2})
  - Water: 0 sq mi (0.00 km^{2})
- Elevation: 6,300 ft (1,900 m)

Population (2020)
  - Total: 3,049
  - Density: 1,020/sq mi (394/km^{2})
- Demonym: Walsenburger
- Time zone: UTC−7 (Mountain (MST))
  - Summer (DST): UTC−6 (MDT)
- ZIP code: 81089
- Area code: 719
- FIPS code: 08-82350
- GNIS feature ID: 2412176
- Website: www.walsenburg.org

Walsenburg is the statutory city that is the county seat of and the most populous municipality in Huerfano County, Colorado, United States. The city population was 3,049 at the 2020 census, down from 3,068 in 2010.

== History ==
Walsenburg was originally settled under the name of La Plaza de los Leones in 1859. The settlement was named after settler Don Miguel Antonio de Leon, who came along with others from New Mexico. A post office called Walsenburg has been in operation since 1870. The community was named after Fred Walsen, an early settler. Robert Ford, the famous gunman, operated a combination saloon and gambling house in Walsenburg; his home at 320 West 7th Street still stands. The town is also remembered in sports history due to a famous newspaper gaffe ("Will Overhead") after the 1933 Indianapolis 500.

=== Colorado Coalfield War ===
Walsenburg Mining Museum

Walsenburg played a central role in the 1913-1914 Strike of the United Mine Workers of America against the Rockefeller-owned Colorado Fuel and Iron, an event better known as the Colorado Coalfield War. The town was the site of a Colorado and Southern Railway stop and location of several gun-battles before and after the April 20, 1914 Ludlow Massacre that killed over a dozen women and children when Colorado National Guard opened fire on a striker encampment at Ludlow, 22 miles south of Walsenburg. Among the first instances of violence in Walsenburg during the coal strikes is known as the Seventh Street Massacre, which saw three miners die in a shooting perpetrated by newly minted Walsenburg deputies.

The Battle of Walsenburg (April 28–29, 1914) was the penultimate engagement of National Guard and militia against pro-strikers during the 10-Day War stage of the conflict. Several men on both sides, as well as at least one uninvolved civilian, were killed before strikers withdrew.

Walsenburg is mentioned in the Woody Guthrie song "Ludlow Massacre".

=== 1927-1928 Colorado Coal Strike ===
In 1927 the coal mines in Walsenburg were one of the many shutdown during the statewide strike led by the IWW.

=== 21st century ===
On June 19, 2013, Boy Scouts at Spanish Peaks Scout Ranch noticed an uncontrolled fire near East Spanish Peak which rapidly grew over the next few days, growing into the East Peak Fire. The entirety of Walsenburg was placed under a pre-evacuation notice. The fire burned 13,572 acres (54.92 km^{2}) and was contained on July 9.

== Geography and climate ==
Walsenburg is located in east-central Huerfano County, on the north side of the Cucharas River, at the eastern edge of the foothills of the Sangre de Cristo Mountains. Interstate 25 runs along the eastern edge of the city, with access from Exits 49, 50, and 52. I-25 leads north 48 miles (77 km) to Pueblo and south 36 miles (58 km) to Trinidad. U.S. Route 160 passes through the center of Walsenburg, leading west across North La Veta Pass 72 miles (116 km) to Alamosa and south with I-25 to Trinidad. Colorado State Highway 10 leads northeast from Walsenburg 73 miles (117 km) to La Junta.

According to the United States Census Bureau, Walsenburg has a total area of 3.2 square miles (8.2 km^{2}), all of it land.

The Spanish Peaks Regional Health Center is located 2 miles (3 km) west of Walsenburg on US 160, opposite the entrance to Lathrop State Park. The building houses a state-operated veterans' retirement home and a community hospital that serves the area.

Because of its elevation near 6,170 ft (1880 m), Walsenburg has a cold semi-arid climate (cold steppe - Köppen classification BSk). It receives abundant sunshine. Summers are warm rather than hot, while winters are cold, although daily high temperatures are typically above freezing. While this is the same BSk classification used to describe the climate of much of the High Plains and intermountain West, Walsenburg's proximity to the Spanish Peaks and Sangre de Cristo Mountains gives it a somewhat different local climate than the flatter and more exposed plains of southeastern Colorado.

Climate data for Walsenburg, Colorado (1991–2020 normals, extremes 1934–present)
Month	Jan	Feb	Mar	Apr	May	Jun	Jul	Aug	Sep	Oct	Nov	Dec	Year
Record high °F (°C)	78 (26)	75 (24)	81 (27)	87 (31)	98 (37)	101 (38)	106 (41)	99 (37)	98 (37)	92 (33)	91 (33)	79 (26)	106 (41)
Mean maximum °F (°C)	65.6 (18.7)	66.1 (18.9)	74.2 (23.4)	79.5 (26.4)	87.0 (30.6)	95.0 (35.0)	96.4 (35.8)	93.7 (34.3)	90.4 (32.4)	83.3 (28.5)	72.9 (22.7)	65.1 (18.4)	97.3 (36.3)
Mean daily maximum °F (°C)	47.3 (8.5)	49.3 (9.6)	57.1 (13.9)	63.4 (17.4)	72.5 (22.5)	83.5 (28.6)	87.4 (30.8)	85.1 (29.5)	79.2 (26.2)	68.4 (20.2)	55.9 (13.3)	46.5 (8.1)	66.3 (19.1)
Daily mean °F (°C)	34.0 (1.1)	35.4 (1.9)	42.1 (5.6)	48.5 (9.2)	57.6 (14.2)	67.7 (19.8)	72.5 (22.5)	70.6 (21.4)	63.6 (17.6)	52.5 (11.4)	41.8 (5.4)	33.4 (0.8)	51.6 (10.9)
Mean daily minimum °F (°C)	20.7 (−6.3)	21.5 (−5.8)	27.2 (−2.7)	33.6 (0.9)	42.7 (5.9)	51.8 (11.0)	57.5 (14.2)	56.2 (13.4)	48.0 (8.9)	36.6 (2.6)	27.7 (−2.4)	20.4 (−6.4)	37.0 (2.8)
Mean minimum °F (°C)	−1.3 (−18.5)	0.1 (−17.7)	9.1 (−12.7)	18.3 (−7.6)	29.6 (−1.3)	41.5 (5.3)	49.8 (9.9)	48.3 (9.1)	34.9 (1.6)	19.7 (−6.8)	9.0 (−12.8)	−2.5 (−19.2)	−7.7 (−22.1)
Record low °F (°C)	−36 (−38)	−25 (−32)	−14 (−26)	−2 (−19)	14 (−10)	30 (−1)	41 (5)	37 (3)	21 (−6)	−2 (−19)	−19 (−28)	−27 (−33)	−36 (−38)
Average precipitation inches (mm)	0.83 (21)	0.82 (21)	1.72 (44)	2.26 (57)	1.82 (46)	1.28 (33)	2.24 (57)	2.15 (55)	0.85 (22)	1.31 (33)	1.00 (25)	1.01 (26)	17.29 (439)
Average snowfall inches (cm)	10.5 (27)	12.8 (33)	17.4 (44)	15.1 (38)	2.0 (5.1)	0.0 (0.0)	0.0 (0.0)	0.0 (0.0)	0.5 (1.3)	7.2 (18)	12.7 (32)	13.4 (34)	91.6 (233)
Average precipitation days (≥ 0.01 in)	4.2	5.1	6.7	6.7	7.7	6.3	9.9	10.5	5.7	4.7	5.1	4.9	77.5
Average snowy days (≥ 0.1 in)	4.2	4.9	5.0	3.6	0.6	0.0	0.0	0.0	0.2	1.4	3.9	5.0	28.8
Source: NOAA

== Local attractions and recreation ==
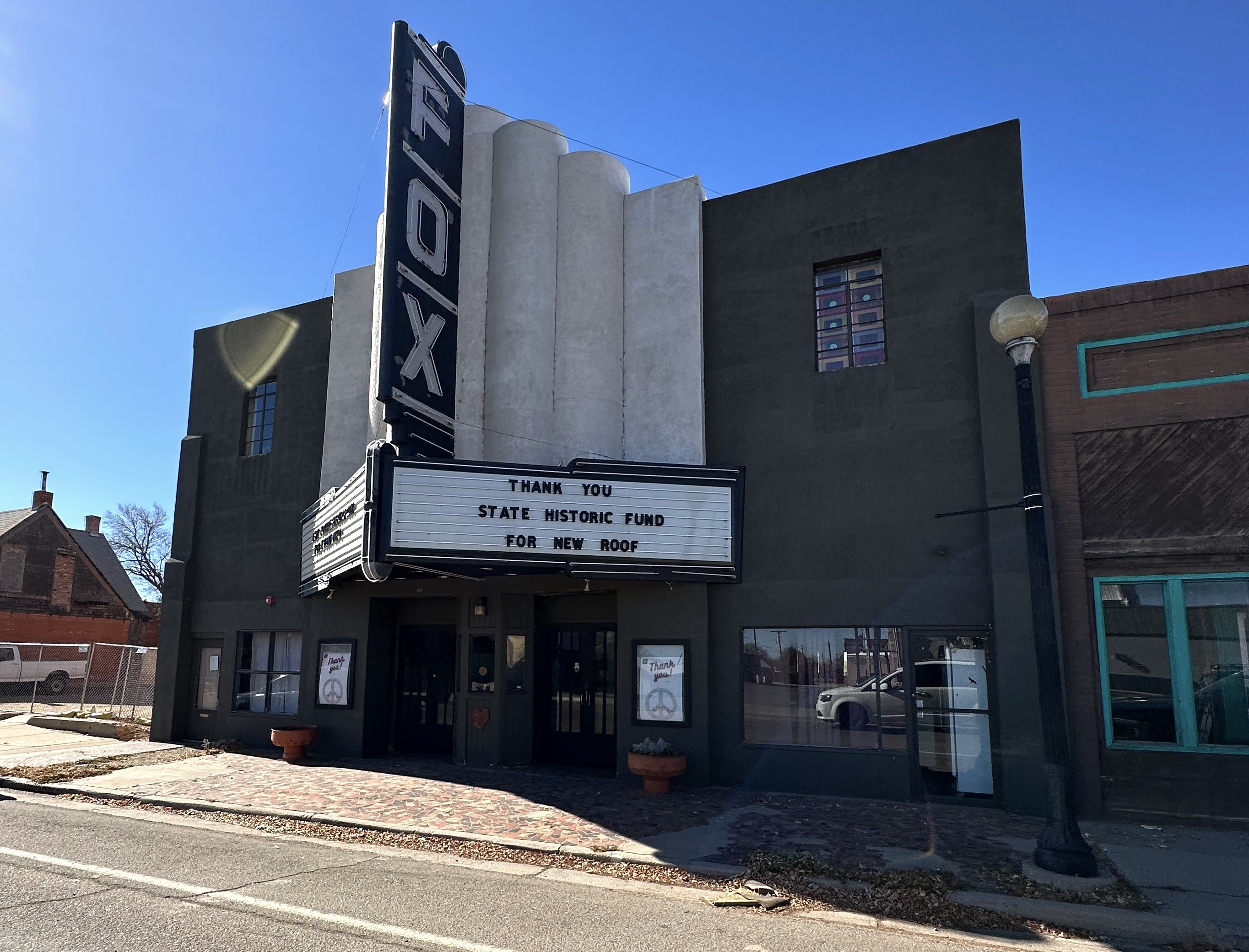
Fox Theatre Walsenburg

Lathrop State Park, located 2 miles (3 km) west of the Walsenburg city limits, is Colorado's first state park and is over 1,600 acres (6.5 km^{2}) in size. Martin Lake and Horseshoe Lake offer fishing stocked by Colorado Parks and Wildlife, water skiing, boating, and jet skiing. Hiking and camping are other activities in the park, and it is the only state park in Colorado with a golf course.

The Spanish Peaks, 10 miles (16 km) southwest of Walsenburg are a national natural landmark and have been named one of "Colorado's Seven Wonders" by The Denver Post. The Highway of Legends, connecting Walsenburg with La Veta, other historic mining towns, and Trinidad, is a National Scenic Byway.

The Walsenburg Golf Course is a 9-hole public golf course open for play year round. The city opened a $2 million water park, "Walsenburg Wild Waters", after efforts by former mayor Maurice Brau and the city council, on May 27, 2007. However, the water park has been closed since about 2020.

== Demographics ==
Historical population
Census	Pop.	Note	%±
1880	377		—
1890	928		146.2%
1900	1,033		11.3%
1910	2,423		134.6%
1920	3,565		47.1%
1930	5,503		54.4%
1940	5,855		6.4%
1950	5,596		−4.4%
1960	5,071		−9.4%
1970	4,329		−14.6%
1980	3,945		−8.9%
1990	3,300		−16.3%
2000	4,182		26.7%
2010	3,068		−26.6%
2020	3,049		−0.6%
U.S. Decennial Census

As of the census of 2000, there were 4,182 people, 1,497 households, and 881 families residing in the city. The population density was 1,795 inhabitants per square mile (693/km^{2}). There were 1,723 housing units at an average density of 740 per square mile (286/km^{2}). The racial makeup of the city was 74.99% White, 4.78% African American, 3.35% Native American, 0.41% Asian, 0.07% Pacific Islander, 12.46% from other races, and 3.95% from two or more races. Hispanic or Latino of any race were 50.96% of the population.

There were 1,497 households, out of which 25.9% had children under the age of 18 living with them, 41.1% were married couples living together, 13.8% had a female householder with no husband present, and 41.1% were non-families. 37.3% of all households were made up of individuals, and 19.4% had someone living alone who was 65 years of age or older. The average household size was 2.25 and the average family size was 2.95.

In the city, the population was spread out, with 20.9% under the age of 18, 9.3% from 18 to 24, 31.1% from 25 to 44, 21.2% from 45 to 64, and 17.5% who were 65 years of age or older. The median age was 38 years. For every 100 females, there were 133.1 males. For every 100 females age 18 and over, there were 141.1 males.

=== 2020 census ===
As of the 2020 census, Walsenburg had a population of 3,049. The median age was 47.1 years. 20.2% of residents were under the age of 18 and 23.5% of residents were 65 years of age or older. For every 100 females there were 100.9 males, and for every 100 females age 18 and over there were 98.0 males age 18 and over.

0.0% of residents lived in urban areas, while 100.0% lived in rural areas.

There were 1,386 households in Walsenburg, of which 24.0% had children under the age of 18 living in them. Of all households, 32.5% were married-couple households, 28.2% were households with a male householder and no spouse or partner present, and 33.0% were households with a female householder and no spouse or partner present. About 39.0% of all households were made up of individuals and 18.4% had someone living alone who was 65 years of age or older.

There were 1,618 housing units, of which 14.3% were vacant. The homeowner vacancy rate was 2.2% and the rental vacancy rate was 2.3%.

Racial composition as of the 2020 census
Race	Number	Percent
White	1,858	60.9%
Black or African American	41	1.3%
American Indian and Alaska Native	115	3.8%
Asian	14	0.5%
Native Hawaiian and Other Pacific Islander	0	0.0%
Some other race	380	12.5%
Two or more races	641	21.0%
Hispanic or Latino (of any race)	1,522	49.9%

== Education ==
Walsenburg lies in Huerfano School District Re-1, one of two school districts in Huerfano County. The district operates two schools in Walsenburg. Peakview School offers Pre-K through sixth grade, and Walsenburg Jr. Sr. High School (formerly John Mall High School) offers seventh through twelfth grades. In the 2024-2025 school year, Walsenburg Jr. Sr. High School had 174 students and a student:teacher ratio of 29:1. Minority enrollment was 66%, with a majority Hispanic.

Walsenburg is also home to a satellite campus of Colorado State University Pueblo, known as CSU Pueblo at Spanish Peaks. The campus opened in August 2024 and offers one degree, a Bachelor of Science in Nursing (BSN).

== Infrastructure ==
=== Transportation ===
Greyhound Lines serves Walsenburg on its route between Denver and Albuquerque. Walsenburg is part of Colorado's Bustang network. It is on the Trinidad-Pueblo Outrider line.

The Colorado Pacific Rio Grande Railroad interchanges in Walsenburg.

== Notable people ==
Notable individuals who were born in or have lived in Walsenburg include:

- Xavier Atencio (1919–2017), animator
- Star Caywood (1915–1968), Colorado state representative
- Robert Ford (1861–1892), murderer, saloon owner
- Debora Greger (born 1949), poet
- Mary Harris "Mother Jones" (1837–1930), labor organizer
- Matthew G. Martínez (1929–2011), U.S. Representative from California
- Frank Olmstead, mayor of Las Vegas, New Mexico, and 18th Auditor of New Mexico
- John R. Petrus (1923–2013), Wisconsin state legislator
- Roy Porter (1923–1998), jazz drummer
- Sam T. Taylor (1903–1977), Colorado state senator
- Albert J. Tomsic (1925–2012), politician, attorney, and judge
- Fred Walsen (1841-1906), city founder and Colorado State Treasurer

== See also ==
- Huerfano County, Colorado
