= Spread Eagle Peak =

Mountain in the state of Colorado

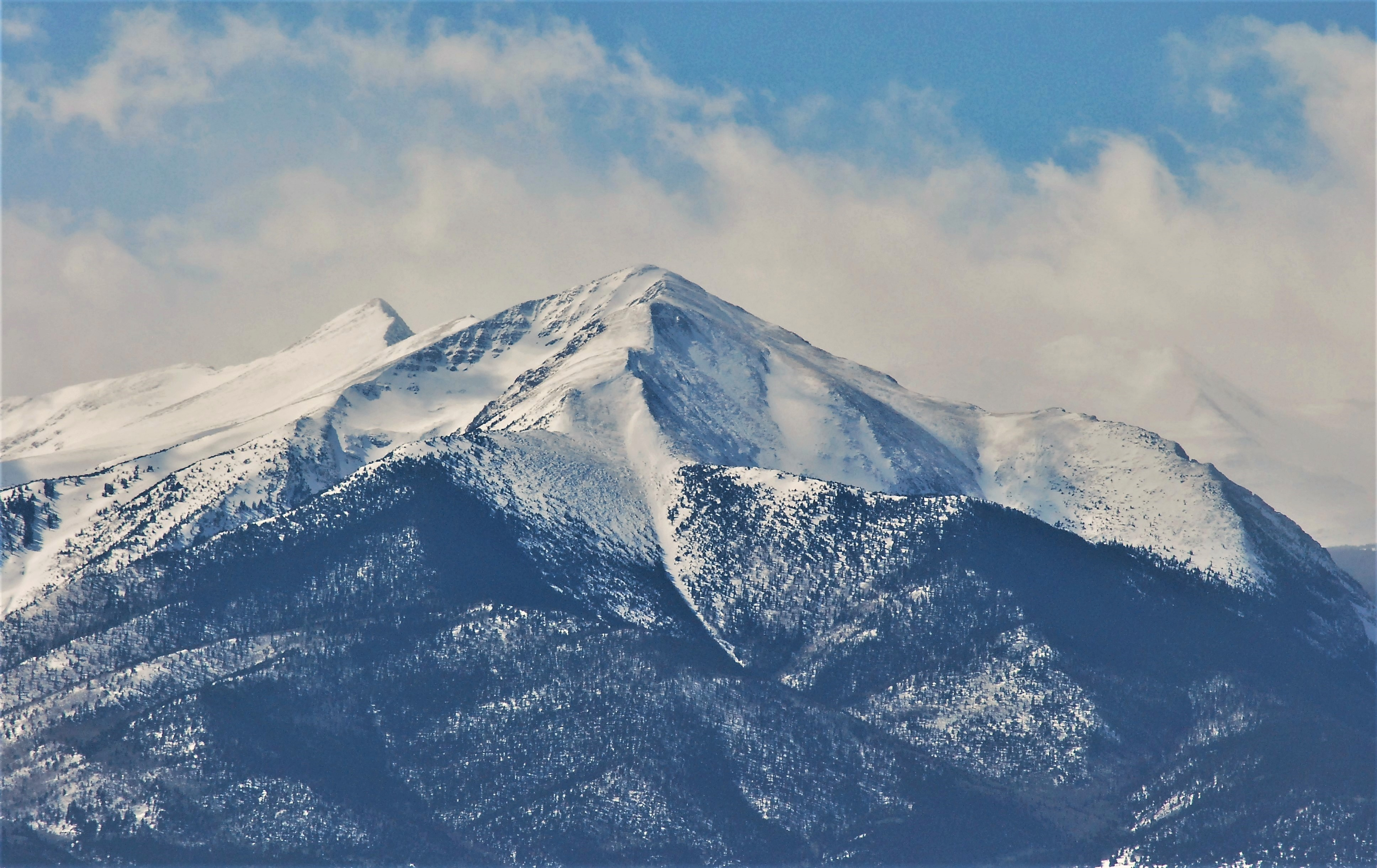
- East aspect

Highest point
- Elevation: 13,423 ft (4,091 m)
- Prominence: 443 ft (135 m)
- Parent peak: Rito Alto Peak (13,803 ft)
- Isolation: 0.93 mi (1.50 km)
- Coordinates: 38°07′31″N 105°38′37″W

Geography
- Location within Colorado Location within the United States
- Country: United States
- State: Colorado
- County: Custer
- Protected area: Sangre de Cristo Wilderness
- Parent range: Rocky Mountains; Sangre de Cristo Range
- Topo map: USGS Electric Peak

Geology
- Mountain type: Fault block

Climbing
- Easiest route: Hiking class 2+

Spread Eagle Peak is a 13,423-foot (4,091 m) mountain summit in Custer County, Colorado, United States.

== Description ==
Spread Eagle Peak is set in the Sangre de Cristo Range which is a subrange of the Rocky Mountains. It is the 15-highest summit in Custer County, and can be seen from Highway 69 and Highway 96 near the town of Westcliffe. The mountain is located in the Sangre de Cristo Wilderness on land managed by San Isabel National Forest. Precipitation runoff from the mountain's slopes drains into tributaries of Grape Creek which in turn is a tributary of the Arkansas River. Topographic relief is significant as the summit rises 1,940 feet (591 m) above Lake of the Clouds in 0.6 mile (1 km) and 3,000 feet (914 m) above North Taylor Creek in one mile (1.6 km). The mountain's toponym has been officially adopted by the United States Board on Geographic Names.

== Climate ==
According to the Köppen climate classification system, Spread Eagle Peak is located in an alpine subarctic climate zone with cold, snowy winters, and cool to warm summers. Due to its altitude, it receives precipitation all year, as snow in winter, and as thunderstorms in summer, with a dry period in late spring.

== Gallery ==
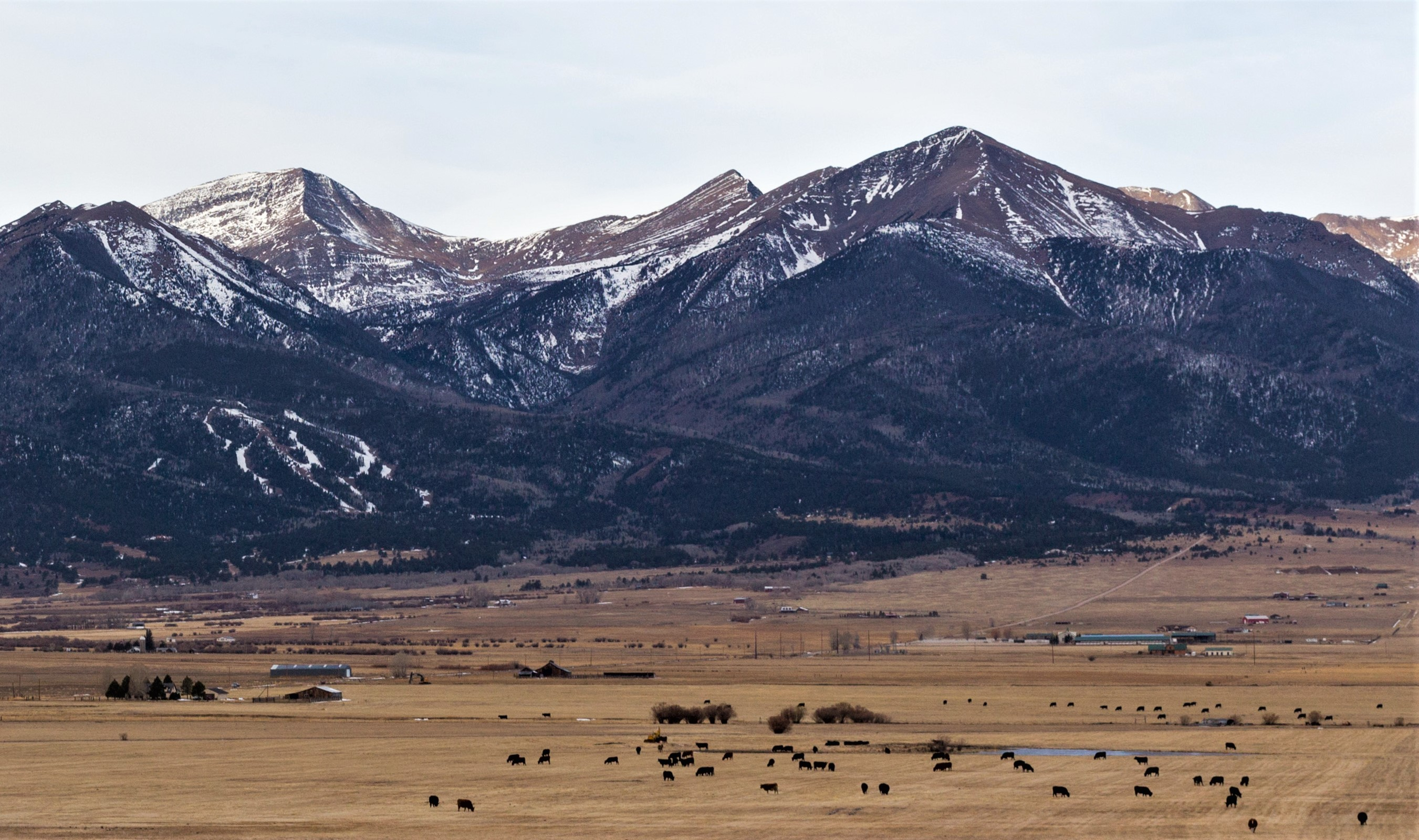
Rito Alto Peak (left) and Spread Eagle Peak (right)

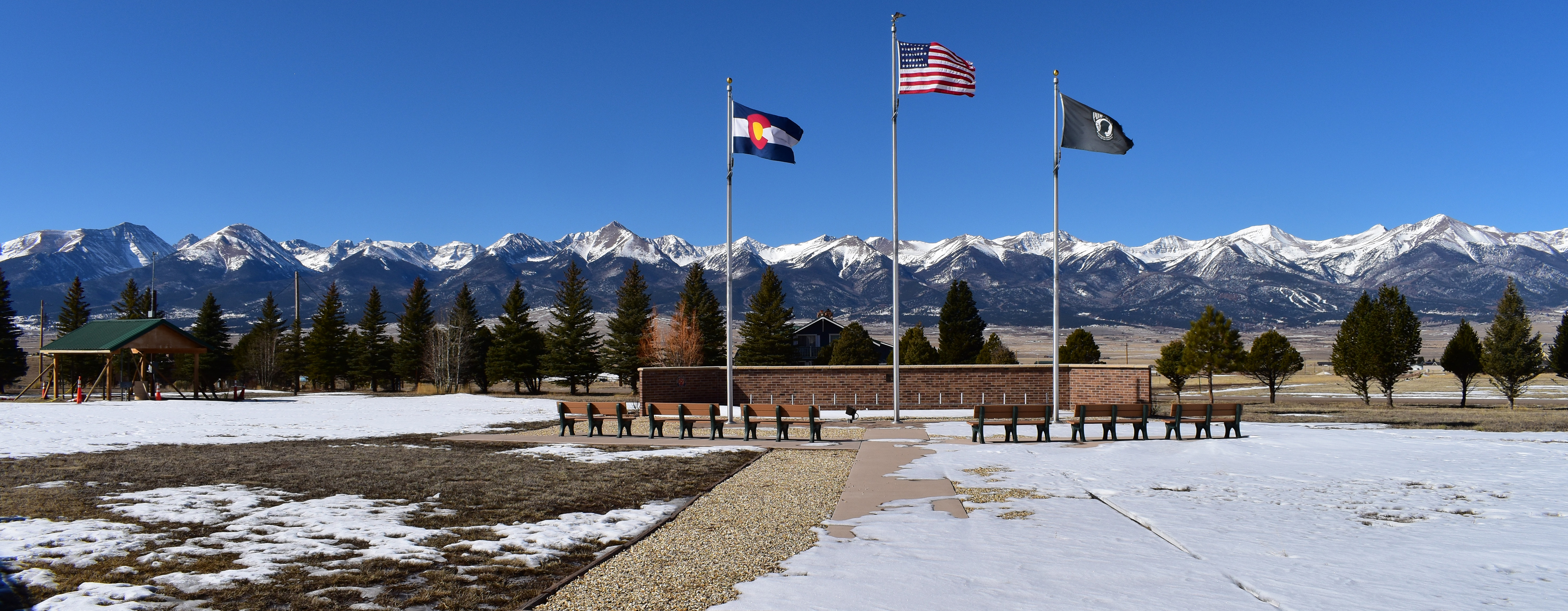
Sangre de Cristos with Spread Eagle Peak furthest to right

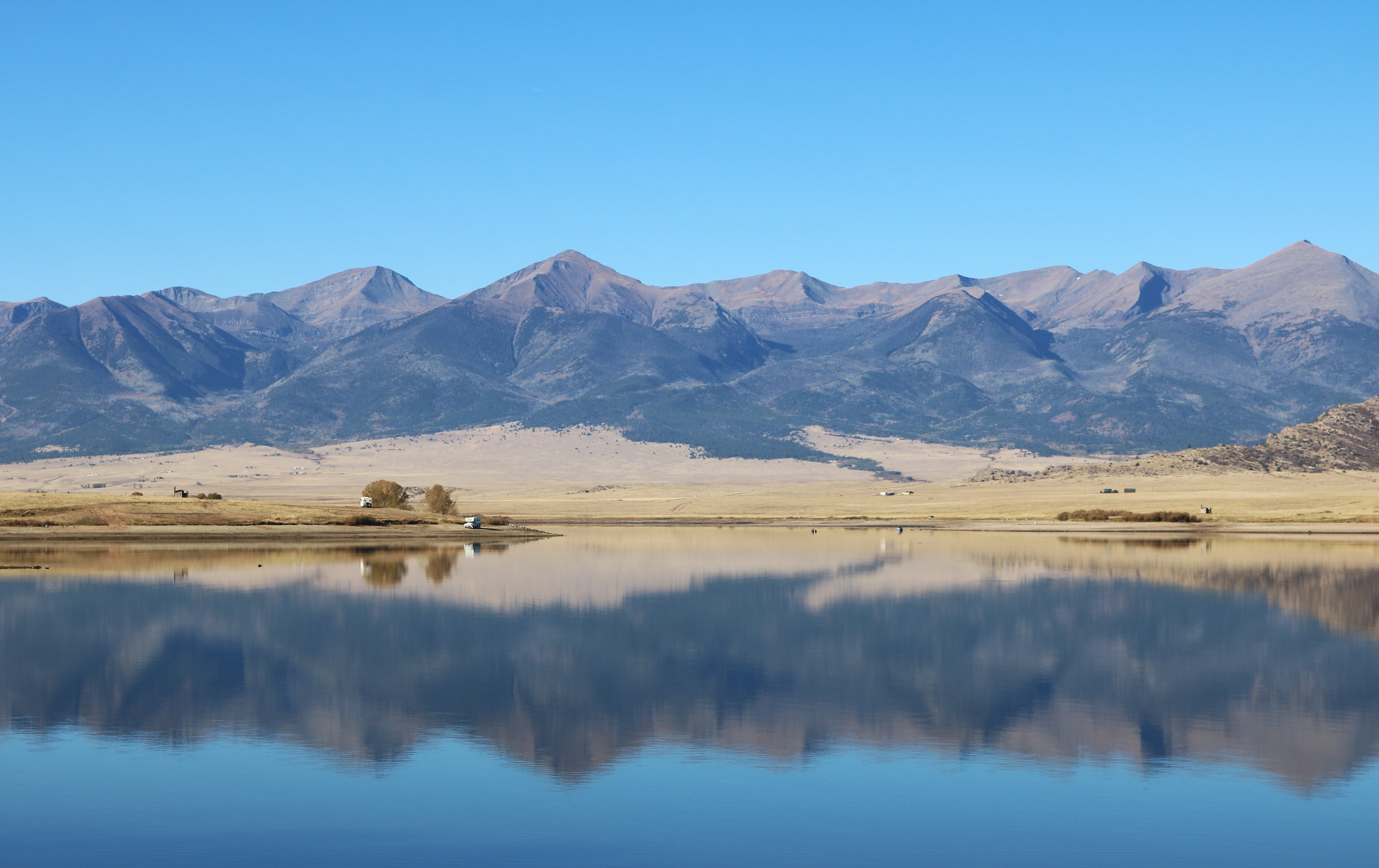
Spread Eagle Peak (left of center) viewed from DeWeese Reservoir

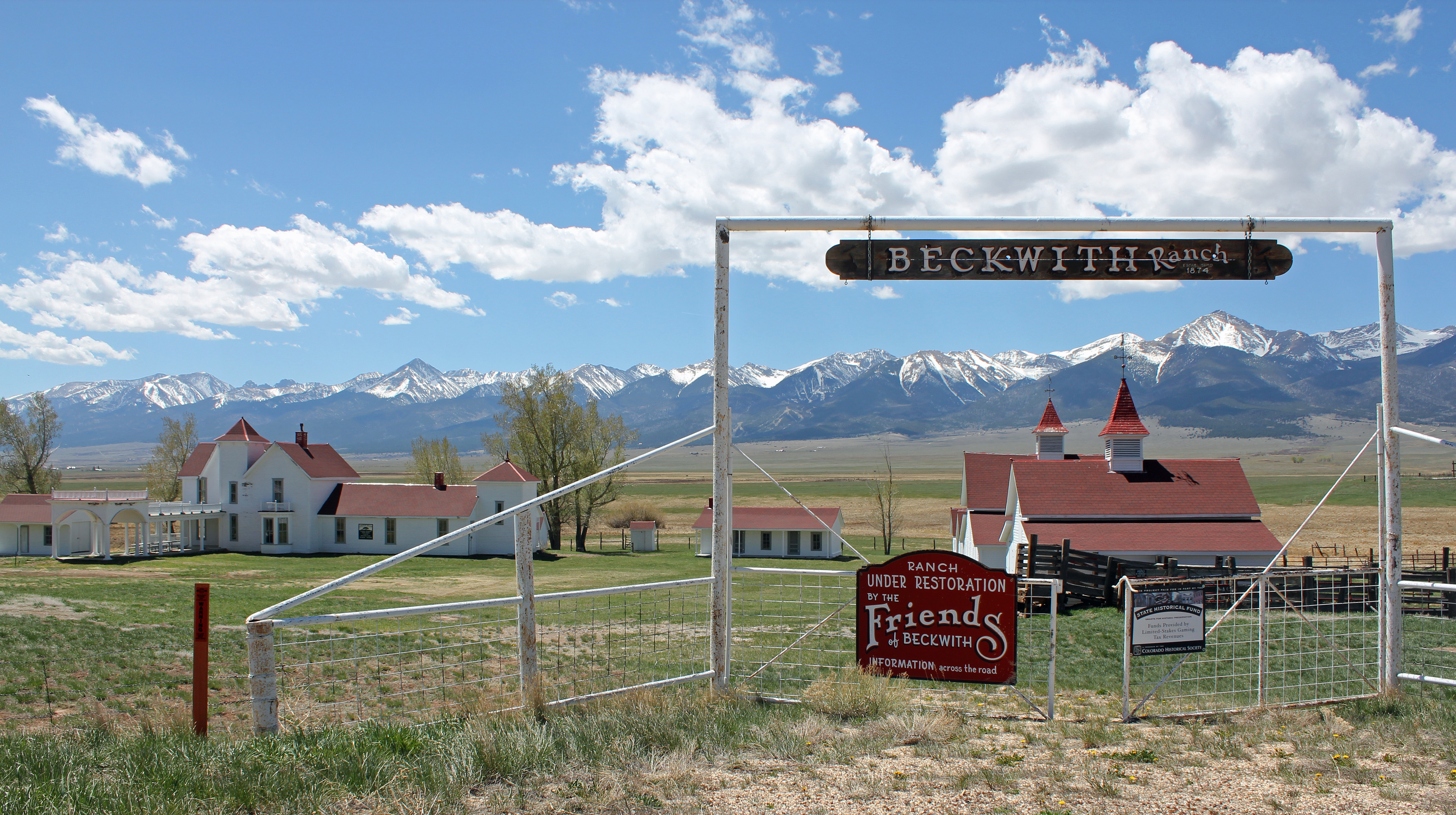
Spread Eagle Peak framed to right under "Ranch"

== See also ==
- Sangre de Cristo Mountains
- Wet Mountain Valley
- Thirteener
