= Eugenia Kennicott =

American photographer

Eugenia Kennicott (1883–1934) recorded her life in Colorado in early 19th century in rare photographic plates. Her sister Anna kept a journal, which was published in 1993, that added to the understanding of life in the American West. Her niece published her aunt's photographs with passages from her mother's diary in the book "Learn to Labor and to Wait". Kennicott suffered with the pain of tuberculosis of the spine throughout her life, and yet kept herself busy with a number of activities, including taking photographs of moments of her life.

== Early life ==
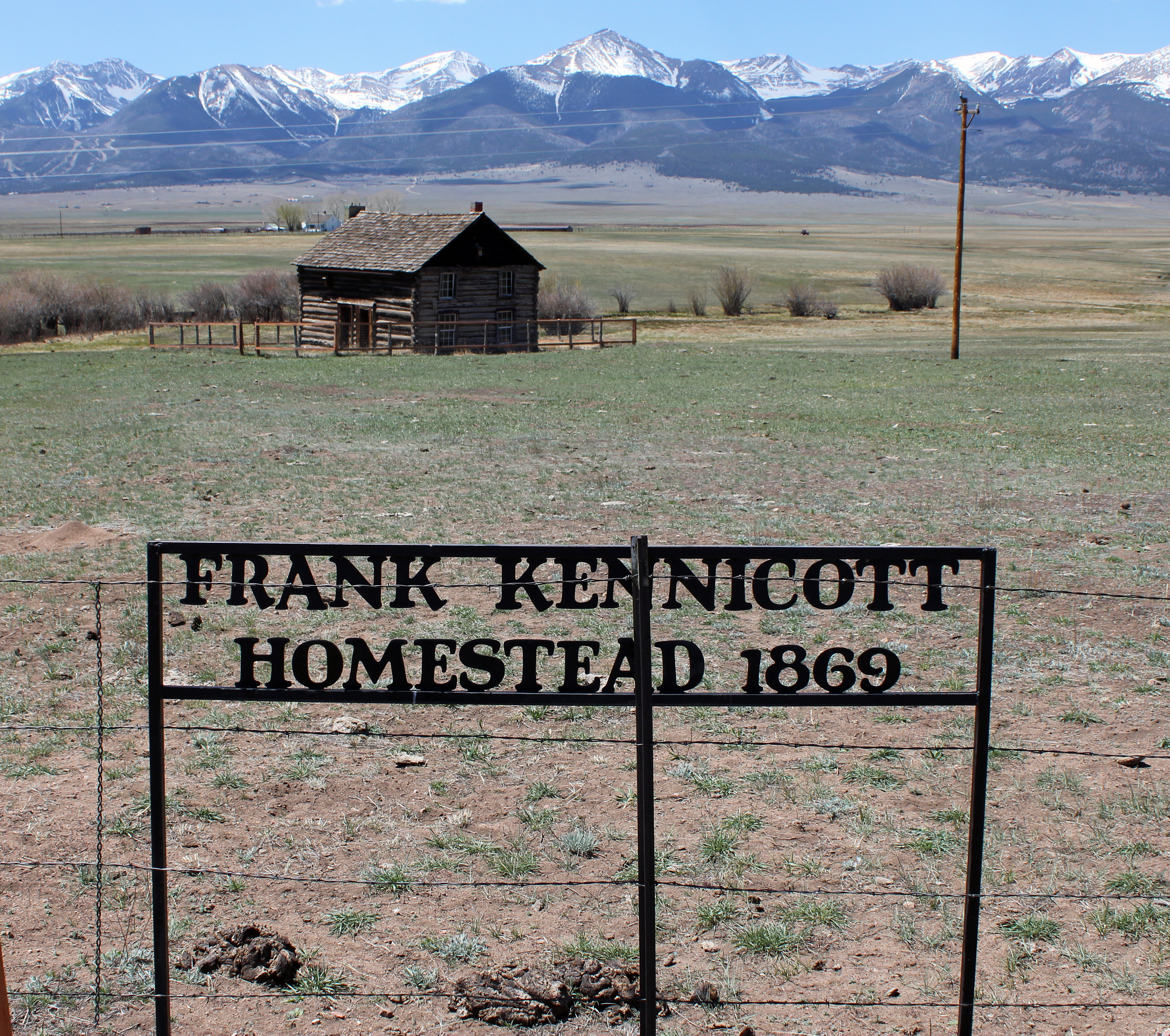
Kennicott Cabin, Westcliffe, Colorado

External image
- Kennicott Cabin at the turn of the 20th century

Eugenia "Gene" Ransom Kennicott was the daughter of Mary Azuba (1854-1939) and Frank Kennicott (1842-1914), who were from Ohio and Illinois. Frank was a Colorado Territory pioneer who settled about five miles north of Westcliffe in the Wet Mountain Valley of the Sangre de Cristo Mountains. He moved from Half Day, Illinois in 1869 seeking better health for his tuberculosis and homesteaded on what would be a 160 acre cattle ranch and hay farm. He built a two-story log house with a one-story addition. Frank had arrived with his brother George, who also had tuberculosis. Their health improved and they prospered. They were amongst several European American men—John Taylor, William Vorhis, and Elisha Horn—who first settled permanently in Wet Mountain Valley in 1869.

He went with his brother to Illinois in 1871 and Frank married Mary Elizabeth Thorp, who was his sister's piano teacher. Mary went with Frank on his return trip to Colorado. Their daughter Mary Thorpe Kennicott was born in 1872, who may have been the first non-Native American born in the Wet Mountain Valley. Three days after her birth, her mother died on childbed fever. Young Mary went to live with her maternal grandmother in Picton, Ontario. By 1880, Lydia J. Thorpe, the maternal grandmother and Mary were living with Frank Kennicott. His parents Eugenie and Hiram Kennicott and six siblings were living on the ranch, too.

Frank married Mary "Minnie" Azuba Smith of Cleveland, Ohio on March 22, 1882. Two of her sisters, Emily and Helen, married two of Frank's brothers. Frank and Mary settled in the house near Westcliffe and had a daughter Eugenia Ransom Kennicott on January 19, 1883 and another Anna Townsend Kennicott born September 14, 1887. Frank's first daughter, Mary Louise Thorpe Kennicott was married and she lived at the Kennicott cabin for a time. Mary's family moved south for her husband's health. After his death, Mary and her children returned to the cabin and operated an apiary for honey.

Frank became a successful farmer, prospering in part due to his degree from a business college in Chicago. He provided a comfortable lifestyle for his family. Frank purchased the adjoining Freer Ranch in 1892 and moved the family there. He had built another house in Cañon City about 25 miles to the northeast. Frank died of cancer in 1914, after which Mary moved to Cañon City. She leased out the house in Westcliffe. Mary died in 1939 following a car accident.

== Life ==
=== Photographer ===
External images
- The photographs of Eugenia Ransom Kennicott, History Colorado
- Eugenia Kennicott photographs, Denver Public Library Digital Collections

Eugenia contracted "tuberculosis of the spine" when she was a two-year-old child, which left her disabled with limited mobility. She had a "humped back". Unable to play with other children, her father purchased a camera and glass negative plates for her in 1899. She took pictures of their farm and local ranches, which she developed with her darkroom equipment. She saved 63 glass negatives taken from 1899 to 1905. Some of the images depict the schoolhouse she attended in Ula, as well as scenic trips the family took across Colorado. Sometimes Anna took pictures of Eugenia, during which she wore braids as a child and then an elegant bun as she grew into womanhood.

Some of the photographs include:

- Eugenia R. Kennicott at age 12, posing in her yard with her dog Penny. She wore loose clothing most of the time in order to hide her back deformities.
- View of the Kennicott ranch in Westcliffe with a girl, possibly Anna Kennicott, posing along the fence.
- Sister Anna cleaning up spilled milk in the Kennicott kitchen
- "Girls Gossiping", with Eugenia and Anna, who was posed as the girl who was gossiping

Over time, Eugenia became proficient in taking photographs by experimenting with composition and lighting.

=== Diary ===
Both Eugenia and Anna kept diaries, but Eugenia's diary was lost over the years. Having returned to Westcliffe at some point, Anna recorded her life as a farm girl in the mountain frontier at the beginning of the late 19th century and early 20th century. The girls took a Denver and Rio Grande Western Railroad train to school in Cañon City. They took care of their pet rabbits and pigs, played cribbage and whist, and embroidered. They took piano lessons and spent Sundays reading the Bible.

=== Adulthood ===
After high school, Anna studied chemistry and classical languages at Stanford University (1904–1909). After she graduated, she married a fellow student, Edwin Rogers at the ranch in 1912. They had four children together. Anne and her husband traveled and had a comfortable life together.

Eugenia lived with pain and depression throughout her life, taking prescribed opiate medicines to manage the pain. She lived with her mother at the ranch and at Cañon City. At times, she stayed at a tuberculosis sanitarium in Colorado Springs or sought treatment in Chicago. She spent her time playing piano, reading books, and weaving baskets. Aside from other crafts, she made clothing for her dolls and dollhouse. She also wrote letters to her cousins. Her father gave her gifts and was demonstrative of his love for Eugenia. Her mother was domineering. She maintained a close relationship with her sister throughout her life. Afraid that she would pass on her illness to others, she had limited affection with her family and her sister's daughters.

== Death ==
Eugenia died at the Westcliffe ranch in 1934. She was buried in Ula Cemetery, as were other Kennicott family members. Frank's first wife was the first settler to be buried there.

Anna lived and taught school in the western United States, Hawaii, and, during her later years, back in Colorado. She became confused, perhaps with Alzheimer's disease, and ripped apart and burned pages from her sister's diary. She died in 1963 in Cañon City. The Kennicott Cabin of the 3,000-acre ranch is on the National Register of Historic Places and designated a Colorado Centennial Farm by the Colorado Historical Society, meaning the property stayed in the family for 100 years or more.

== Learn to Labor and to Wait ==
Anna's daughter Gertrude Schooley compiled Eugenia's photographs with passages from Anna's diaries to create the book Learn to Labor and to Wait. It was published privately in 1993. The glass negatives were donated to the Colorado Historical Society (now History Colorado).

Eugenia's photographs were included in an ongoing exhibit called By Their Hats, Horses and Homes We Shall Know Them at the El Pueblo History Museum in 2016. The exhibit was shown at other locations throughout the state.
