= Rosita, Colorado =

- Town
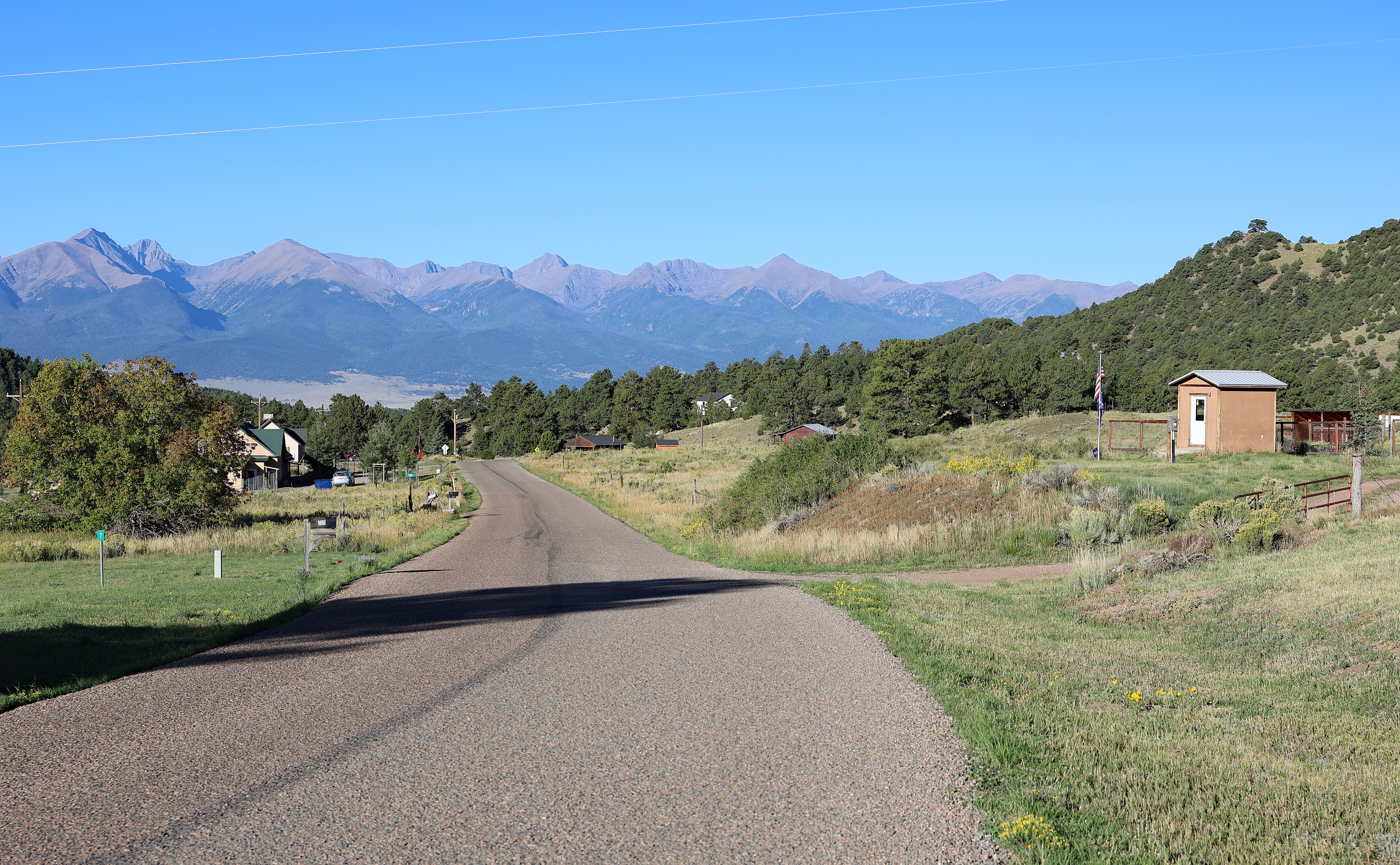
- Rosita in 2025

- Location in Custer County and the state of Colorado Rosita, Colorado (the United States)
- Coordinates: 38°05′50″N 105°20′10″W
- Country: United States
- State: Colorado
- County: Custer County
- Founded: 1872

Government
  - Type: ghost town
- Elevation: 8,809 ft (2,685 m)
- Time zone: UTC-7 (MST)
  - Summer (DST): UTC-6 (MDT)
- ZIP code: Westcliffe 81252
- Area code: 719
- GNIS feature ID: 0192319

Rosita was a silver mining town — now a ghost town — in Custer County, Colorado, United States. Rosita is Spanish for little rose. Although the old town has almost entirely disappeared (the former post office building was for a time a restaurant), the surrounding area has been largely developed into semi-rural home sites.

The town was used in the filming of the 1958 western movie Saddle the Wind.

== History ==
Rosita was founded in late 1872 by prospectors attracted by discoveries of silver. The town was composed of tents and log cabins, but soon had stores, carpenters, a hotel, saloon, blacksmith shop, and an assayer. By 1874 the town had more than a thousand residents and 400 buildings. A U.S. post office opened in 1874, and in September 1874 the Rosita Index began as a weekly newspaper. Rosita took the seat of Custer County away from Ula (now also a ghost town) in 1878.

Despite some rich strikes in the Pocahantas and Humboldt mines, the silver veins around Rosita ran out of ore in a few years. In the early 1880s, Rosita was surpassed by the nearby mining towns of Querida and Silver Cliff. After a bitter four-year fight, Silver Cliff took the county seat from Rosita in the 1886 election, and Rosita declined further. The U.S. post office was closed in 1966. ZIP code 81252 now serves Rosita, but mail must be addressed to Westcliffe.

Rosita gained brief publicity in 1875 when the Pocahontas Mining War occurred in October of that year. Two men from out of state, Walter Stuart and J. R. Boyd, came to Rosita, promising to establish a bank. They soon claimed ownership of the Pocahontas Mine. The mine was taken over and occupied by men hired by Boyd and Stuart, and who were led by a former Civil War officer and ex inmate, Major George W. Graham. Graham came to town vowing revenge on certain townspeople. He had escaped from the Colorado Territorial Prison in 1874 and was recaptured by several men near Rosita. On October 11, 1875, Graham shot Pringle in the foot. Early the next morning a mob of townsmen went to the Pocahontas Mine to confront Graham, who then begged to be let go. The men told Graham to turn and run, and as he did, the mob emptied their guns into his back. That same day a coroner's inquest showed he had taken 36 balls to his body. He was placed in a five dollar coffin and taken by wagon to be buried outside of town. No one was ever charged with his murder.

== Geography ==
Rosita is at an elevation of 8,809 feet (2,685 meters), at 38°05′50″N 105°20′10″W. The ruins of the town are located on the eastern flanks of the Wet Mountain Valley.

== See also ==
List of ghost towns in Colorado
