= Beckwith Ranch =

- U.S. National Register of Historic Places
- U.S. Historic district
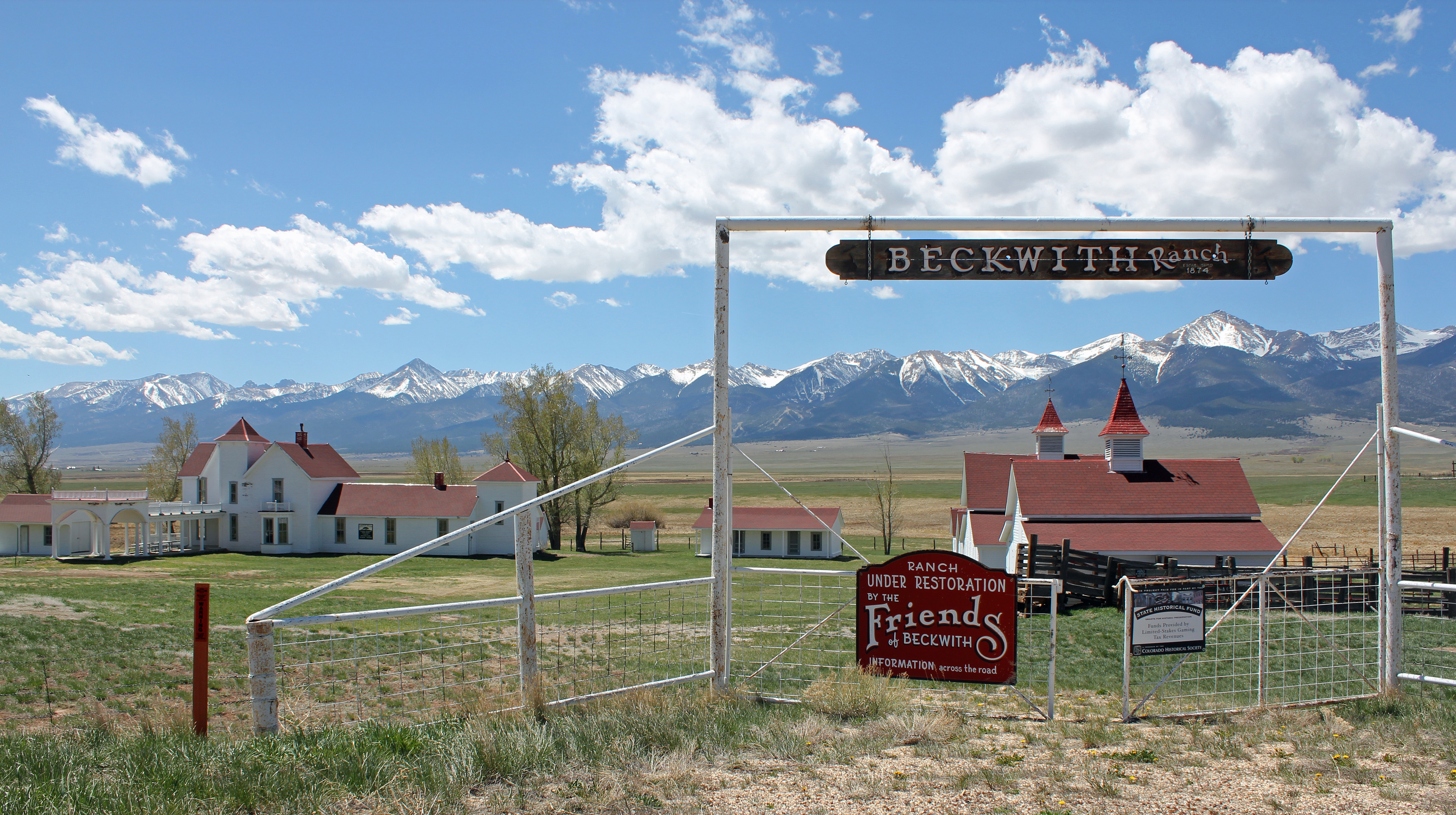
- Beckwith Ranch in 2012

- Location within Colorado Location within the United States
- Nearest city: Westcliffe, Colorado
- Coordinates: 38°11′31″N 105°31′21″W
- Area: 3.3 acres (1.3 ha)
- Architectural style: Late Victorian
- NRHP reference No.: 98000568
- Added to NRHP: May 20, 1998

The Beckwith Ranch is a historic cattle ranch in the Wet Mountain Valley of Custer County, Colorado, USA. The headquarters spread over eleven buildings, ten of which have been listed on the National Register of Historic Places since May 20, 1998. It was established by Elton and Edwin Beckwith, two brothers from Mount Desert Island, Maine.
