= Kennicott Cabin =

Historic house in Colorado, United States

- U.S. National Register of Historic Places
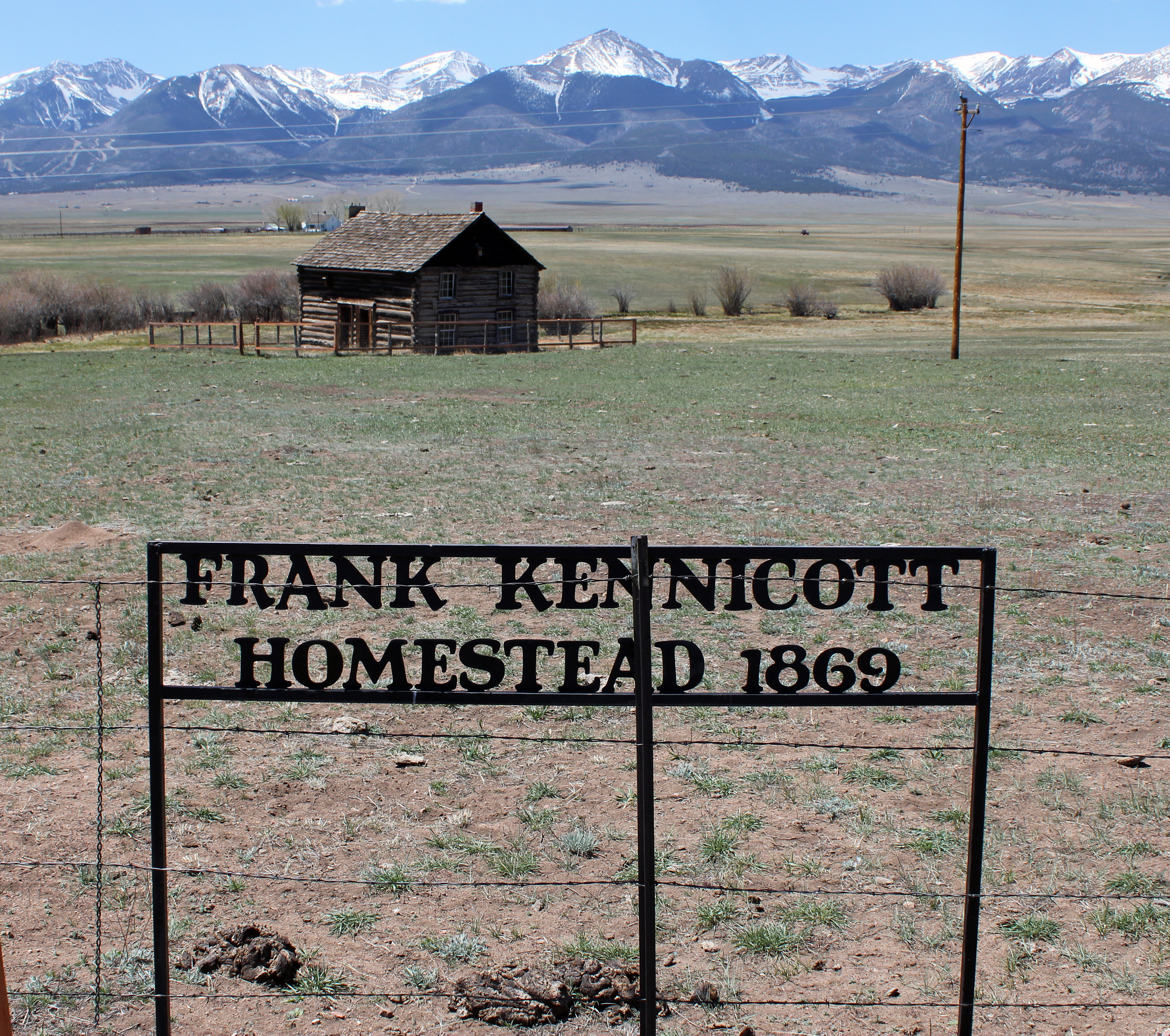

- Location within Colorado Location within the United States
- Nearest city: Westcliffe, Colorado
- Coordinates: 38°10′57″N 105°30′35″W
- Area: 4.4 acres (1.8 ha)
- Built: 1869
- Built by: Kennicott, Frank Langdon
- Architectural style: Log house
- NRHP reference No.: 97000046
- Added to NRHP: February 14, 1997

The Kennicott Cabin is a log house located at State Highway 69, north of Westcliffe, Colorado. The cabin was constructed in 1869 by Frank Kennicott, one of the first settlers in the Wet Mountain Valley. The cabin's design reflects cabin construction methods popular in the Eastern United States rather than common Western designs, possibly because Kennicott was from Illinois. In addition, the cabin is an unusual example of a two-story log cabin.

The cabin was added to the National Register of Historic Places on February 14, 1997.
