= Horn Peak =

Mountain in the state of Colorado

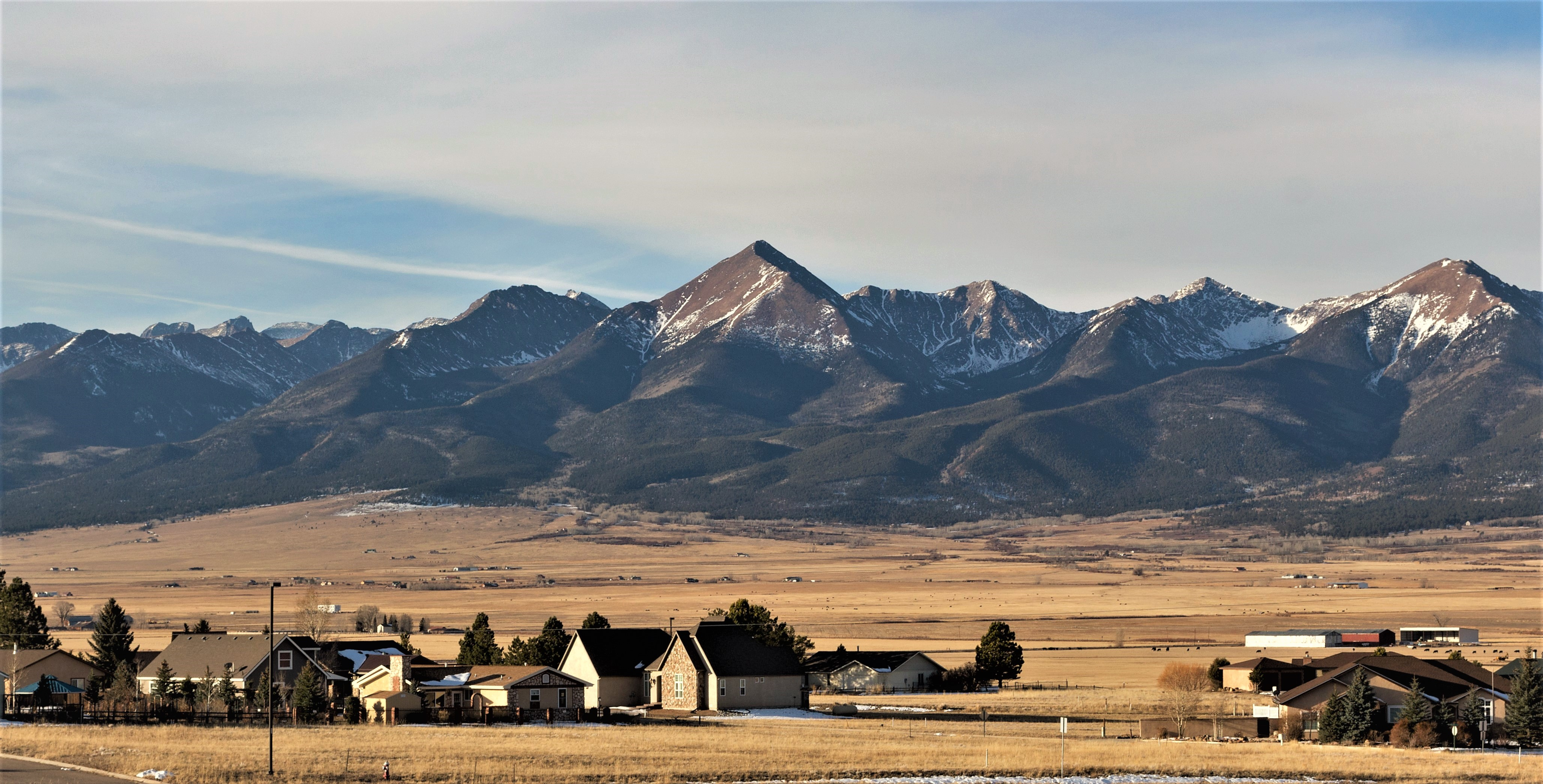
- Northeast aspect, from Westcliffe

Highest point
- Elevation: 13,450 ft (4,100 m)
- Prominence: 747 ft (228 m)
- Parent peak: Fluted Peak (13,554 ft)
- Isolation: 1.28 mi (2.06 km)
- Coordinates: 38°02′19″N 105°35′10″W

Geography
- Location within Colorado Location within the United States
- Country: United States
- State: Colorado
- County: Custer
- Protected area: Sangre de Cristo Wilderness
- Parent range: Rocky Mountains; Sangre de Cristo Range
- Topo map: USGS Horn Peak

Geology
- Mountain type: Fault block

Climbing
- Easiest route: Hiking class 2 Northeast ridge or West ridge

Horn Peak is a 13,450-foot (4,100 m) mountain summit in Custer County, Colorado, United States.

== Description ==
Horn Peak is set in the Sangre de Cristo Range, which is a subrange of the Rocky Mountains. It is the 14-highest summit in Custer County, and can be seen from Highway 69 near the community of Westcliffe. The mountain is located in the Sangre de Cristo Wilderness on land managed by San Isabel National Forest. Precipitation runoff from the mountain's slopes drains into tributaries of Grape Creek which in turn is a tributary of the Arkansas River. Topographic relief is significant as the summit rises 2,250 feet (686 m) above Cottonwood Creek in 0.6 mile (1 km). An ascent of the peak involves nine miles (14 km) of strenuous hiking. The mountain's toponym has been officially adopted by the United States Board on Geographic Names.

== Climate ==
According to the Köppen climate classification system, Horn Peak is located in an alpine subarctic climate zone with cold, snowy winters and cool to warm summers. Due to its altitude, it receives precipitation all year, as snow in winter and thunderstorms in summer, with a dry period in late spring.

== Gallery ==
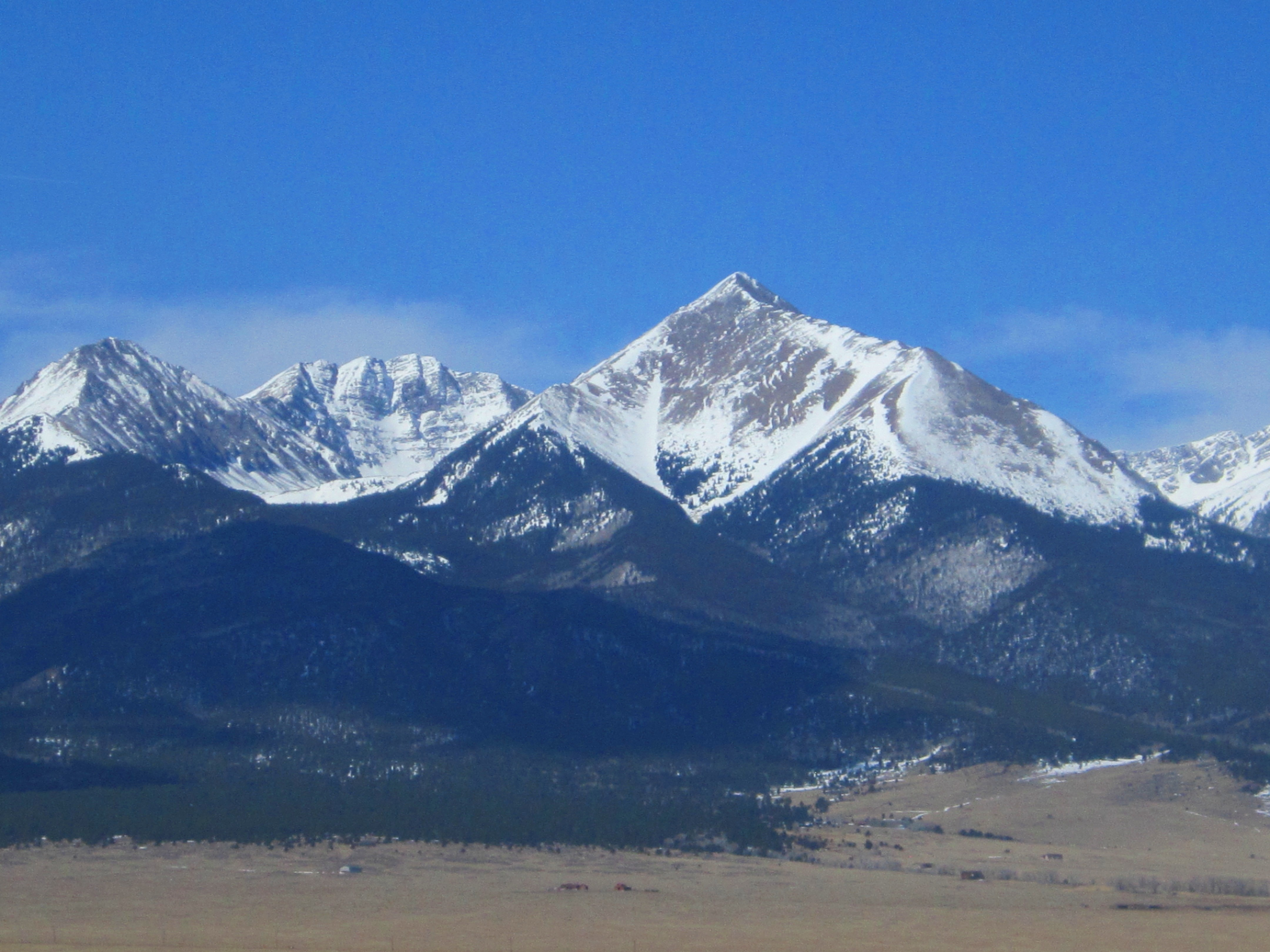
Left to right: Little Horn Peak, Fluted Peak, Horn Peak

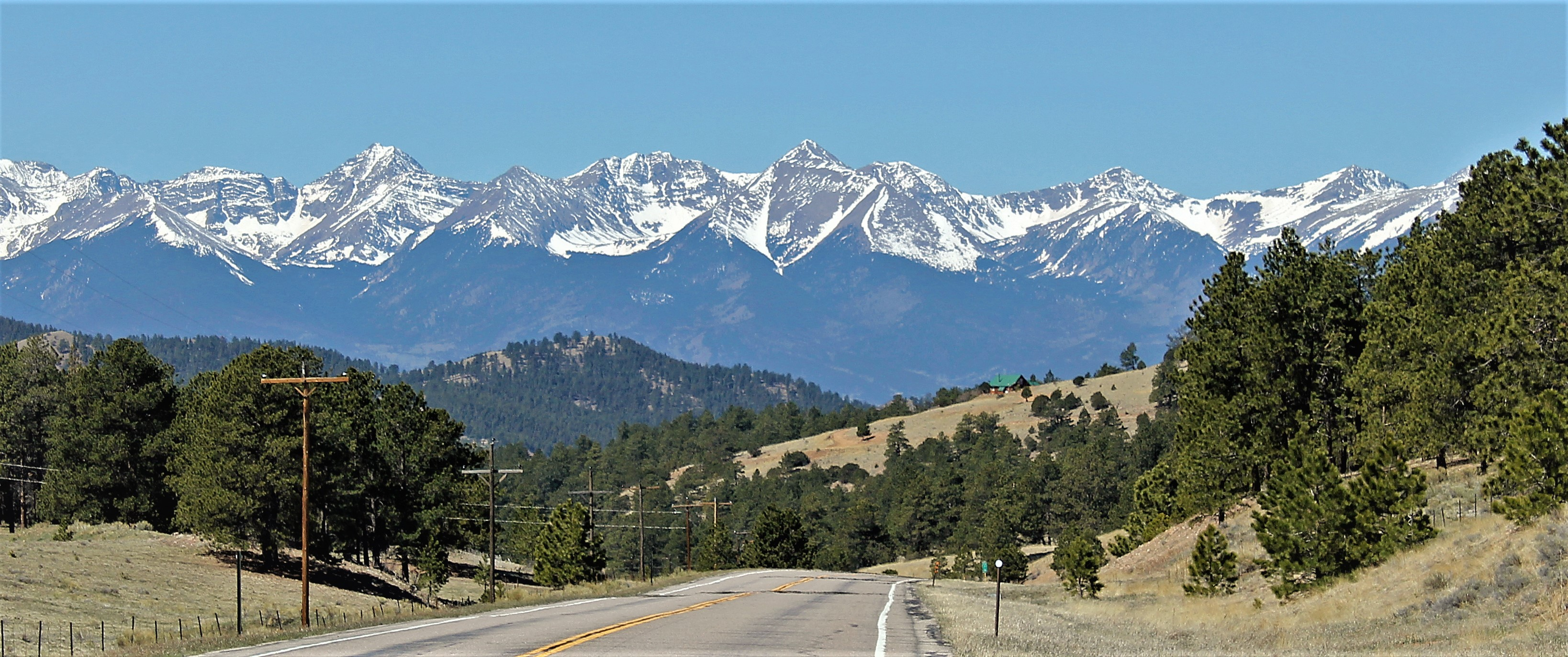
Sangre de Cristo Range viewed from Hardscrabble Pass. Horn Peak is centered, Mount Adams is the highest peak to the left, and Fluted Peak is between those two.

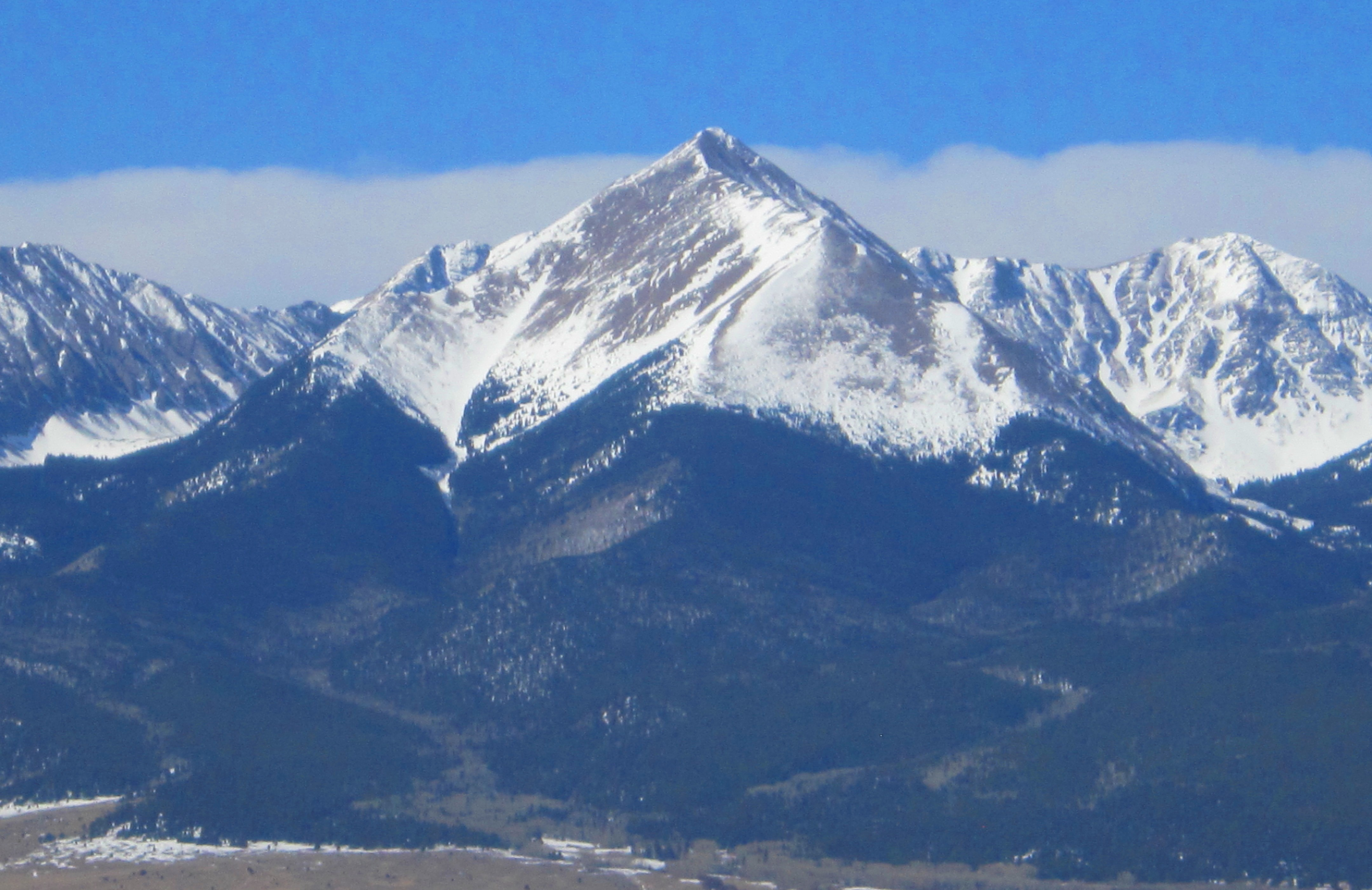
Horn Peak

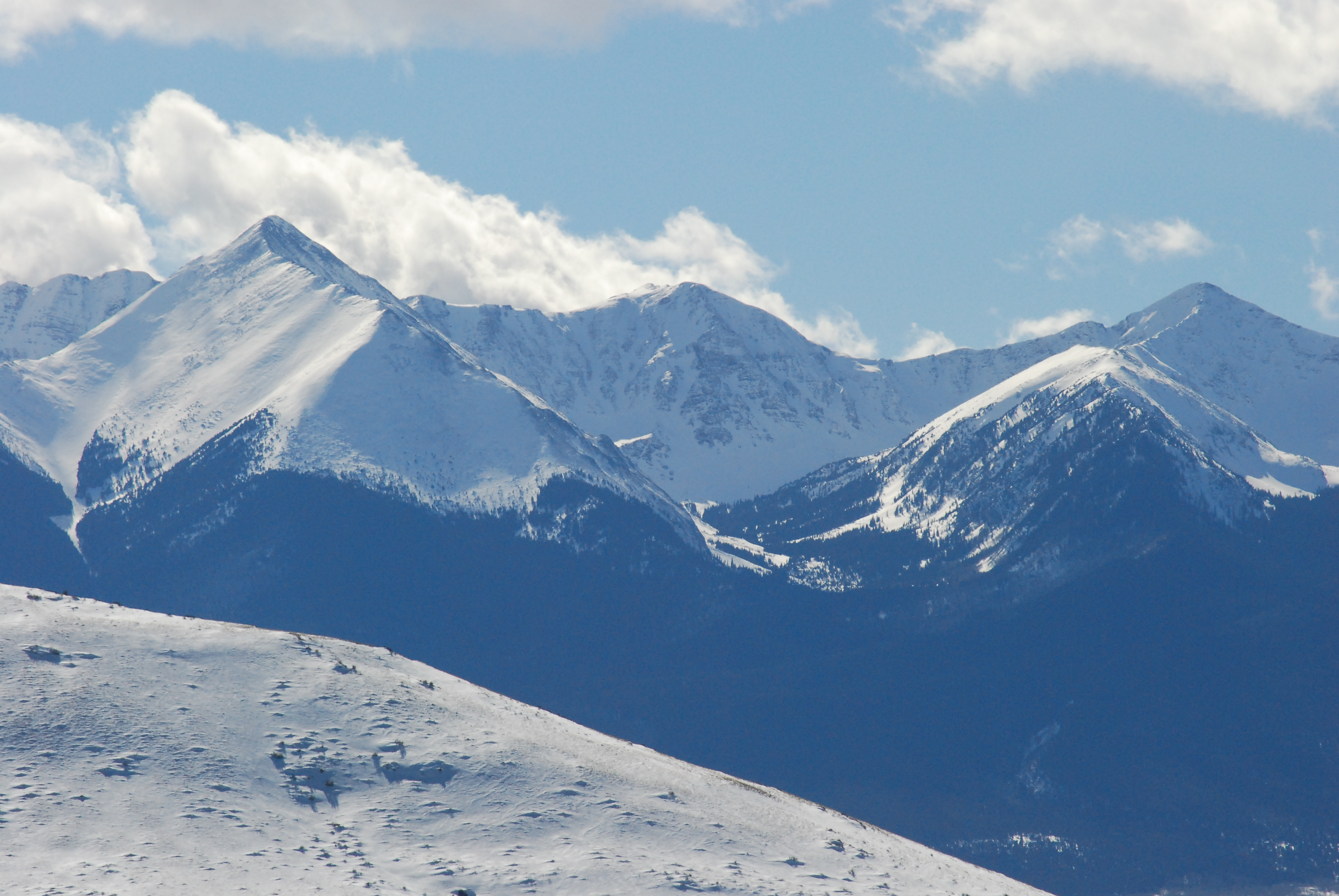
Horn Peak (left) and Comanche Peak (right)

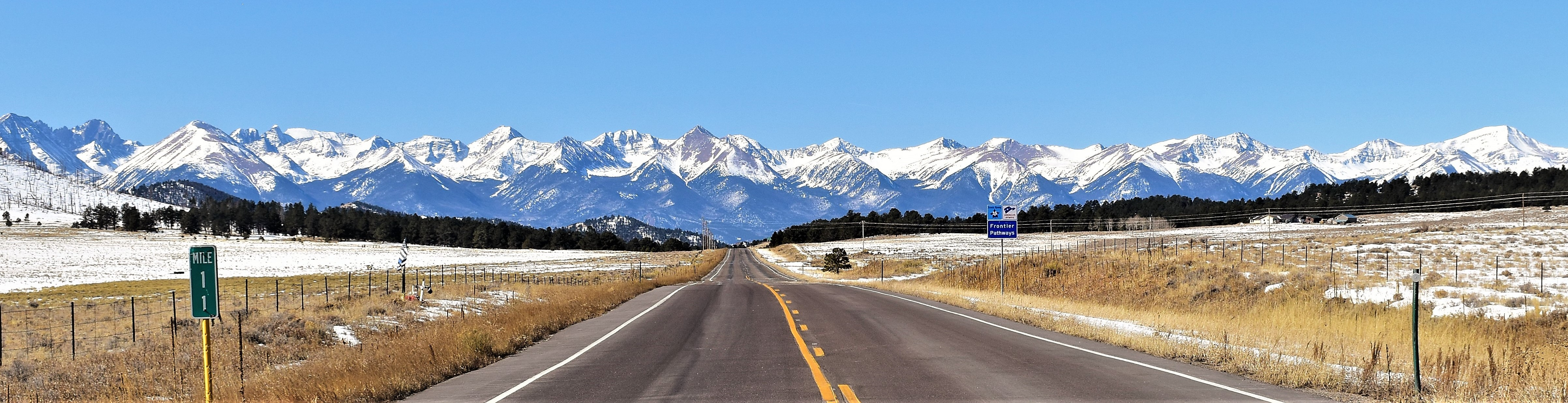
Sangre de Cristo Range with road pointed at Horn Peak

== See also ==
- Sangre de Cristo Mountains
- Thirteener
