= Ula, Colorado =

Ula
- Extinct settlement
- Location within Colorado
- Coordinates: 38°9′0″N 105°30′7″W
- Country: United States
- State: Colorado
- County: Custer
- Nearest town: Westcliffe
- Established: 1871

Ula, Colorado was the temporary county seat of Custer County, Colorado, from 1877 to 1878. Northwest of Westcliffe, the site of the former town is located on Hemenway Road at Colorado Roads 170 and 175. Voters elected Rosita, Colorado, the county seat as the county seat in 1878.

The town of Ula, located near Grape and Taylor Creeks, was founded in 1871. By that time, Joseph Davis homesteaded land near the confluence of the creeks and built a log cabin. Davis built a larger home that was also a general store and hotel. The post office operated from 1871 to 1891. Between 1871 and 1876, the town established a schoolhouse, library, another store and a cemetery, which is located on Country Road 170, .2 miles (0.32 km) west of the town site. The post office was moved to the second store, where church services and dances were held on the second floor. The Protestant Episcopal Church established a mission in the town about 1873. In 1910, the Denver and Rio Grande Western Railroad went through the town. Now, most of the town site is part of a ranch.

Formerly part of Fremont County, Colorado, the town was also known as Britain's Paradise and Ure. It was accidentally named Ula instead of Ure when the town was established.

== Notable people ==
- Moccasin Bill Perkins, William Perkins (1825–1904), hunter and story teller
