= Silver Cliff Cemetery =

Cemetery in Custer County, Colorado

Coordinates: 38°07′21″N 105°26′34″W

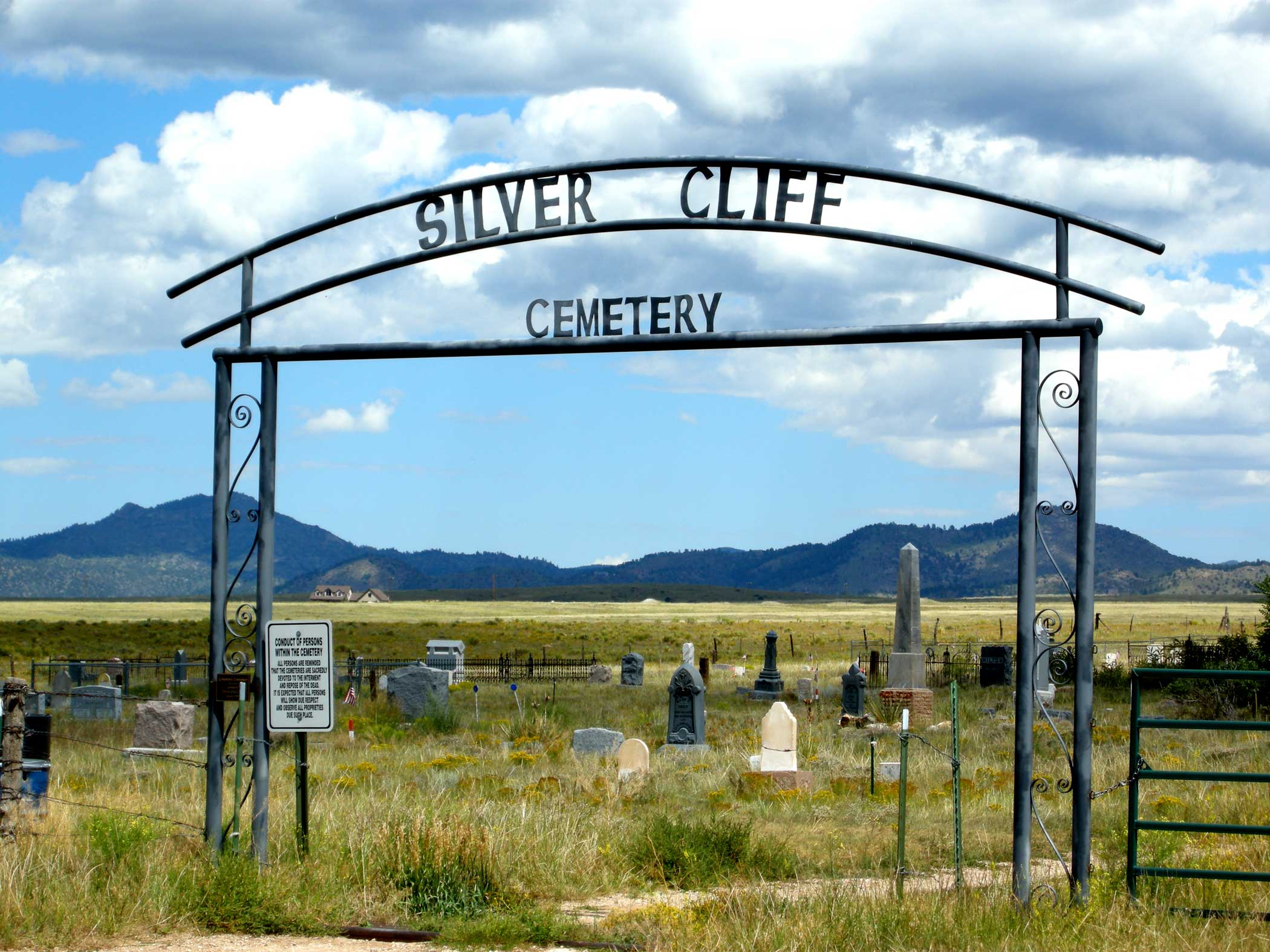
- Silver Cliff Cemetery
- Interactive map of Silver Cliff Cemetery

Details
- Established: 1880s
- Location: Silver Cliff, Colorado

Silver Cliff Cemetery is a cemetery established in the early 1880s outside Silver Cliff, Colorado, about a mile south of State Highway 96 on Mill Street (County Road 340).

== Background ==
Silver Cliff Cemetery is split into two sections, one half for Catholic burials and the other half, known as the Cross of the Assumption Cemetery, for Protestant burials. The cemetery is still in use today and is owned and operated by the Town of Silver Cliff.

== Lights ==
The cemetery is noted for reports of "dancing blue lights" seen on occasion around the cemetery at night. The lights, which according to reports look like blue lantern lights or white spheres, are said to float through the cemetery and bounce on the headstones. These effects have been reported since the 1880s. The lights were featured in the August 1969 National Geographic Magazine, Volume 136, No. 2. These lights were seen for the first time by a group of miners who took the cemetery as a shortcut to get to the town more quickly. But the miners got lost and later saw the lights appearing. Word of the lights spread, and as the lights became famous more people became more interested in the cemetery. Some people say these lights are a normal phenomenon called "Wildfire", which normally appears in swamps and wet places.

Researcher and writer Karen Stollznow investigated the cemetery, and wrote that there were several possible natural explanations for the coloured lights, such as a receptor on the retina of the eye sensitive to the colour blue, or the effect of phosphenes, brief flashes of light perceived by the eye, sometimes induced by eye movements, "which would also explain the lights “dancing”, “floating” or “darting” across the cemetery." Stollznow reports that not all visitors see the lights, supporting her conclusion that "seeing lights during darkness in Silver Cliff Cemetery is a personal experience, likely caused by a person’s eyes and mind after they have spent many hours determined to “see” something."
