= Grape Creek (Colorado) =

Stream in south-central Colorado, US

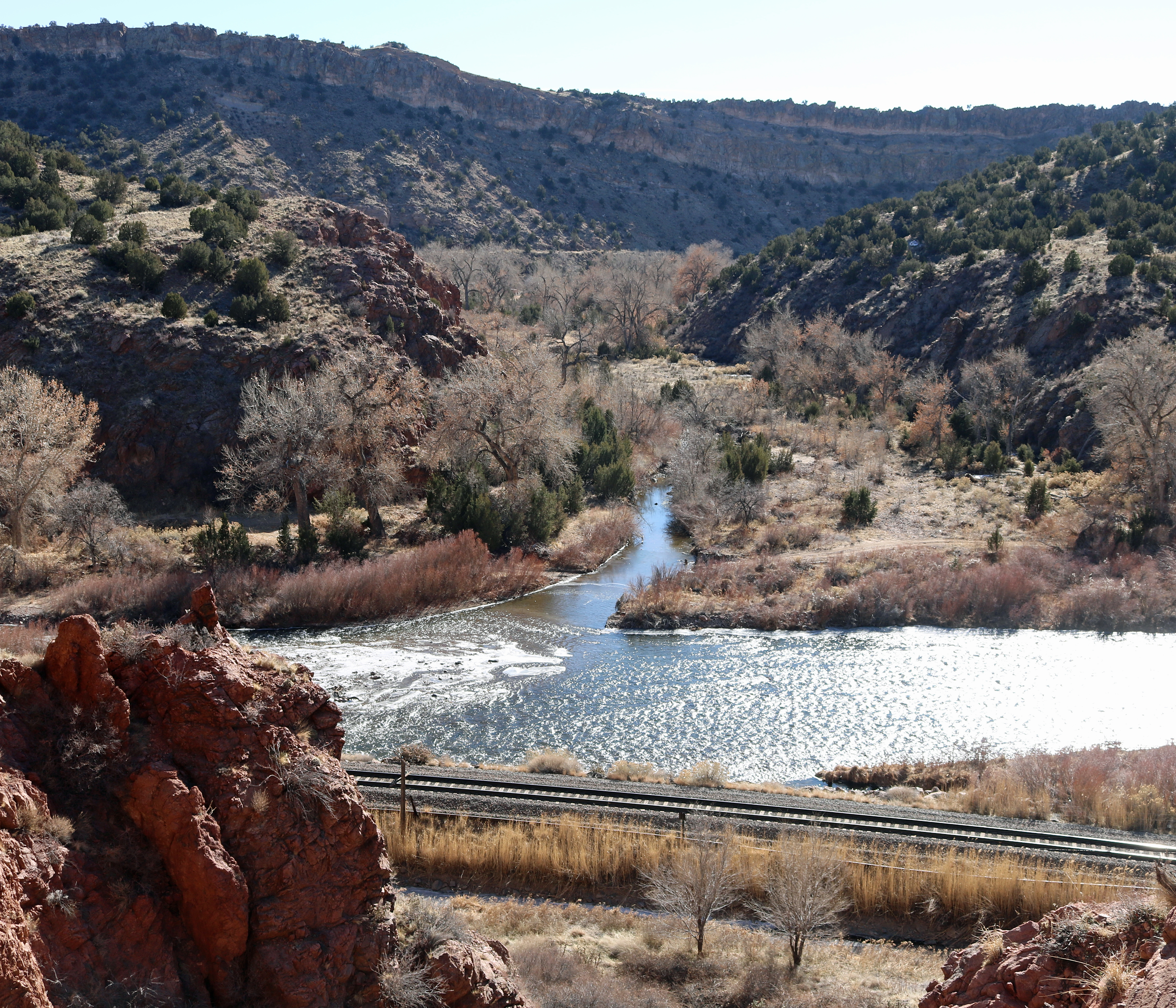
- The mouth of Grape Creek, at its confluence with the Arkansas River near Cañon City, Colorado

Physical characteristics
- Source
  - location: Custer County, Colorado
  - coordinates: 37°54′31″N 105°28′49″W
- Mouth
  - location: Cañon City, Colorado
  - coordinates: 38°25′51″N 105°16′07″W
  - elevation: 5,374 feet (1,638 meters)

Basin features
- Progression: Arkansas River—Mississippi River

Grape Creek is a tributary of the Arkansas River that flows through Custer and Fremont counties in South-Central Colorado. The creek drains much of the Wet Mountain Valley, located between the Sangre de Cristo Mountains and the Wet Mountains in Custer County.

== Course ==
The creek rises in the Sangre de Cristo Mountains near Blueberry Mountain. From there, it descends down the east side of the Sangre de Cristos to the Wet Mountain Valley and then flows northwards towards the town of Westcliffe. North of the town, it crosses under Highway 69 and heads northeast, where it is impounded by DeWeese Reservoir.

Leaving the reservoir, the creek flows generally north down a rocky and remote canyon, eventually emptying into the Arkansas River just west of Cañon City.

== Public lands ==
After it leaves the DeWeese Reservoir, the creek passes through a canyon owned by the BLM, which has classified 16,600 acres (67,000,000 square meters) of the river canyon as an area of critical environmental concern.

The creek also passes through a small portion of the San Isabel National Forest.

Next, the creek passes through two parcels of land (1,280 acres (5,200,000 square meters)) owned by the State of Colorado and managed by Colorado Parks and Wildlife. This State Trust Land is located in Fremont County and offers hunting, fishing, and wildlife viewing.

Finally, the creek is the centerpiece of the 600-acre (2,400,000-square-meter) Temple Canyon Park, owned and managed by the city of Cañon City. The park is located near the river's end, before it merges with the Arkansas.

== See also ==
- List of rivers of Colorado
