= Silver Cliff, Colorado =

Town in Custer County, Colorado, United States

- Town
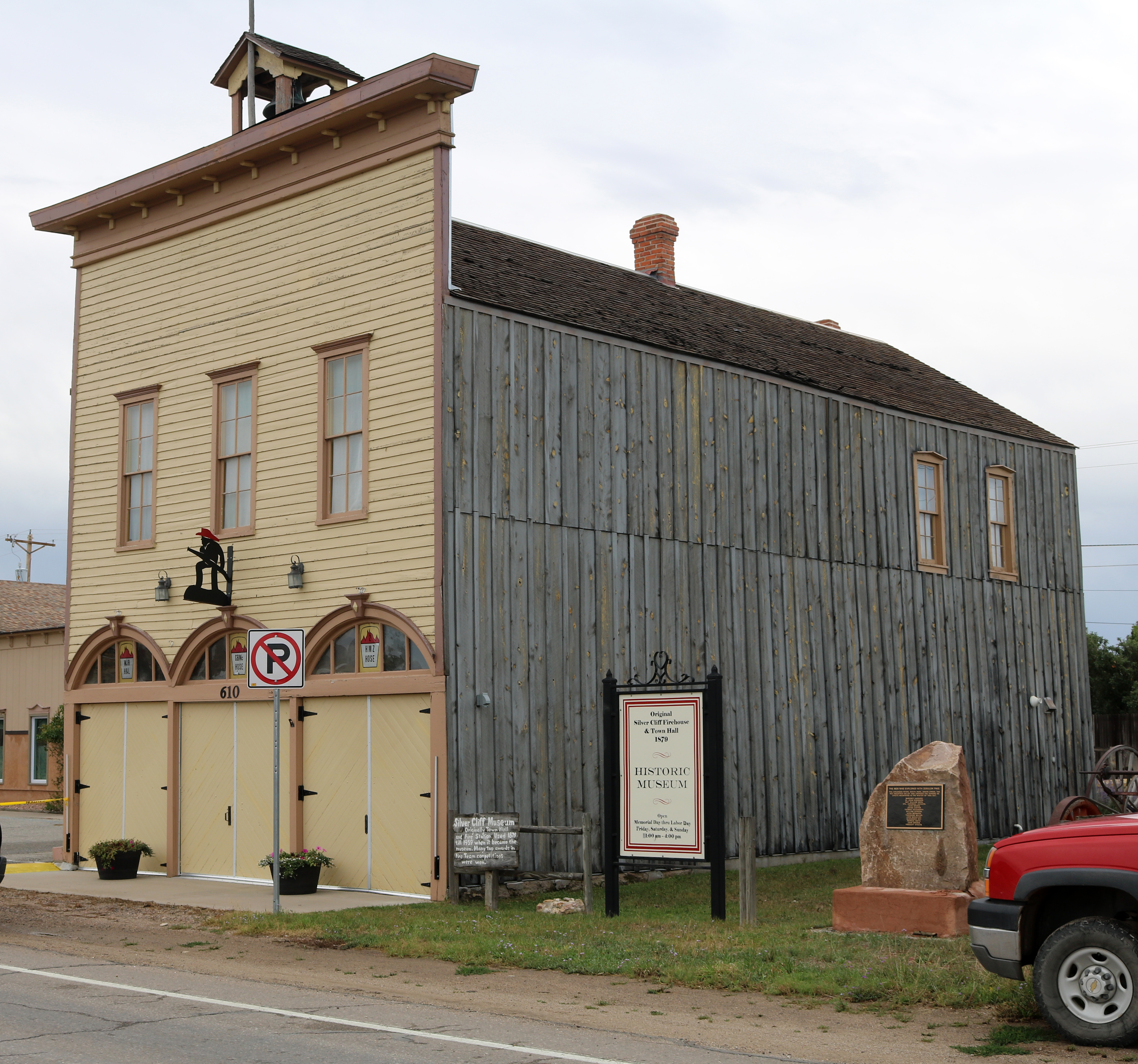
- The original Silver Cliff firehouse & town hall, now a museum, on Main Street, September 2018

- Flag Logo

- Location of Silver Cliff in Custer County, Colorado
- Coordinates: 38°07′45″N 105°24′35″W
- Country: United States
- State: Colorado
- County: Custer
- Incorporated: February 10, 1879

Government
  - Type: Statutory town

Area
  - Total: 15.46 sq mi (40.04 km^{2})
  - Land: 15.46 sq mi (40.03 km^{2})
  - Water: 0 sq mi (0.00 km^{2})
- Elevation: 8,262 ft (2,518 m)

Population (2020)
  - Total: 609
  - Density: 43.1/sq mi (16.66/km^{2})
- Time zone: UTC-7 (Mountain (MST))
  - Summer (DST): UTC-6 (MDT)
- ZIP code: 81252
- Area code: 719
- FIPS code: 08-70250
- GNIS feature ID: 2413286
- Website: silvercliffco.com

The Town of Silver Cliff is the statutory town that is the most populous municipality in Custer County, Colorado, United States. The population was 609 at the 2020 census, up from 587 in 2010.

== History ==
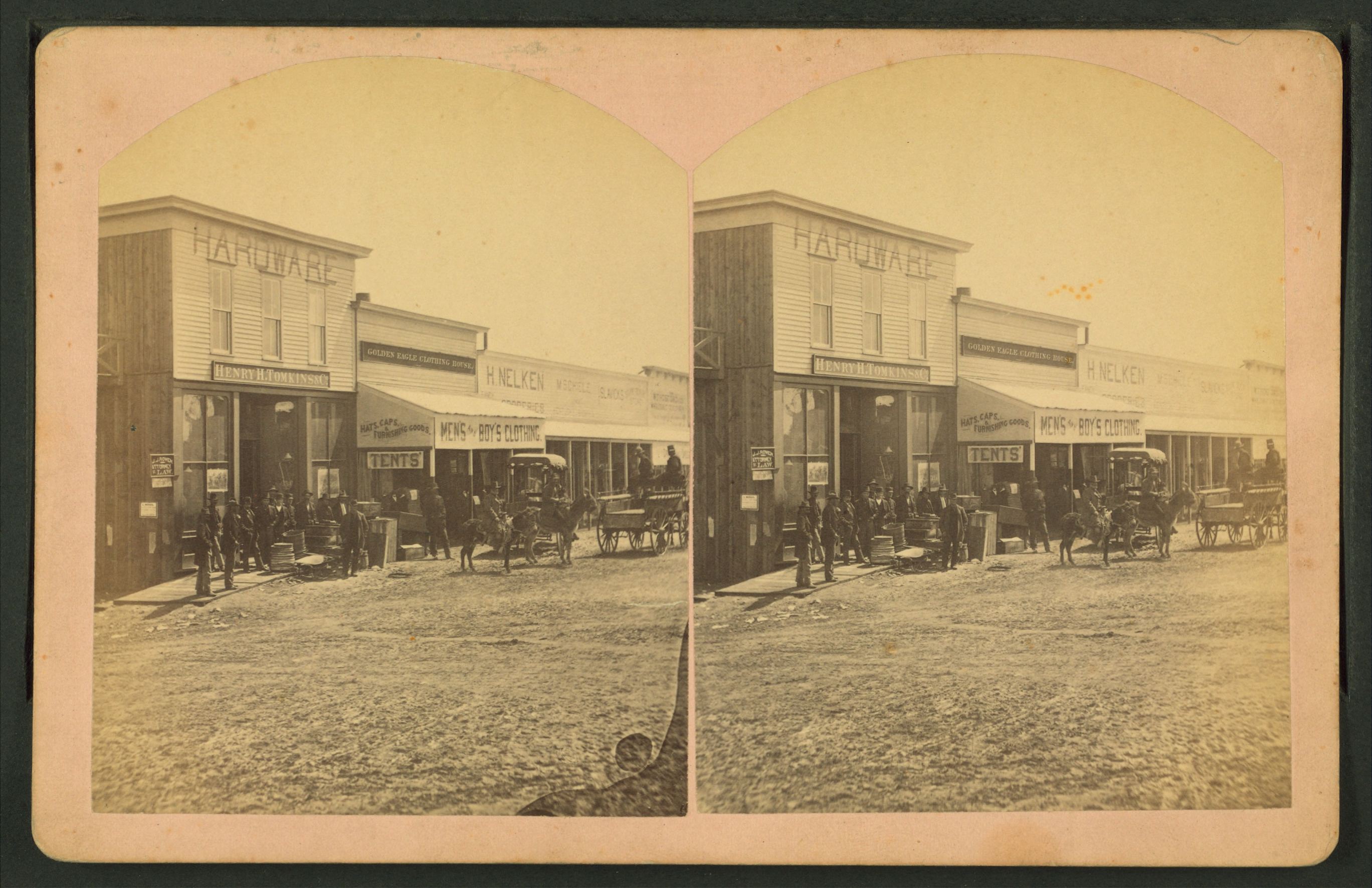
Corner of Main & Mill streets, from Robert N. Dennis collection of stereoscopic views 1870?-1900?

Silver Cliff was formed in the late 1870s to house the miners of its namesake, the Silver Cliff mine, and other silver mines in the neighborhood, such as the Bull-Domingo. The town, incorporated in 1879, had 5,040 residents by the 1880 census, making it the third most populous town in Colorado, after Denver and Leadville.

Silver Cliff was the county seat from 1886 (when the town won the seat from Rosita) to 1928 (when the seat moved to nearby Westcliffe).

The Silver Cliff mine, also known as the Geyser mine, is on the hill immediately north of the town. Although a large operation that employed many residents of Silver Cliff, the mine was the unfortunate object of eastern stock manipulators. Shares in the Silver Cliff mine were promoted in 1879 by James R. Keene, a famous New York stock operator. The company went bankrupt within a few years, and was sold to the Julianna Mining Company, which was run by an even more unscrupulous stock promoter, Dr. Richard C. Flower of Boston. The Julianna company went bankrupt in 1888. The shareholders rescued the company and renamed it the Geyser Mining Company. Although Flower withdrew from the management, the Geyser Mining Company continued to be run by some of Flower's cronies, so it should not be a surprise that the mine never made a profit. At one time the Geyser mine was the deepest mine in Colorado.

== Geography ==
Silver Cliff is located near the geographic center of Custer County. The town of Westcliffe is immediately adjacent to its west. The town is 54 miles (87 km) west of Pueblo, via Colorado State Highway 96.

According to the United States Census Bureau, Silver Cliff has a total area of 15.5 square miles (40.1 km^{2}), all of it land.

== Dark skies ==
Silver Cliff and neighboring Westcliffe, Colorado are recognized as IDA International Dark Sky Communities by The International Dark-Sky Association. Gentle persuasion has resulted in residents and business in the towns and surrounding ranch land reducing the amount of light pollution.

== Demographics ==
Historical population
Census	Pop.	Note	%±
1880	5,040		—
1890	546		−89.2%
1900	576		5.5%
1910	250		−56.6%
1920	241		−3.6%
1930	201		−16.6%
1940	309		53.7%
1950	217		−29.8%
1960	153		−29.5%
1970	126		−17.6%
1980	280		122.2%
1990	322		15.0%
2000	512		59.0%
2010	587		14.6%
2020	609		3.7%
U.S. Decennial Census

As of the census of 2000, there were 512 people, 217 households, and 141 families residing in the town. The population density was 32.8 inhabitants per square mile (12.7/km^{2}). There were 284 housing units at an average density of 18.2 units per square mile (7.0 units/km^{2}). The racial makeup of the town was 95.51% White, 0.20% African American, 2.73% Native American, 0.59% from other races, and 0.98% from two or more races. Hispanic or Latino of any race were 1.95% of the population.

There were 217 households, out of which 33.2% had children under the age of 18 living with them, 48.8% were married couples living together, 12.0% had a female householder with no husband present, and 35.0% were non-families. 31.3% of all households were made up of individuals, and 10.1% had someone living alone who was 65 years of age or older. The average household size was 2.36 and the average family size was 2.94.

In the town, the population was spread out, with 29.7% under the age of 18, 6.3% from 18 to 24, 26.0% from 25 to 44, 24.8% from 45 to 64, and 13.3% who were 65 years of age or older. The median age was 36 years. For every 100 females, there were 96.2 males. For every 100 females age 18 and over, there were 92.5 males.

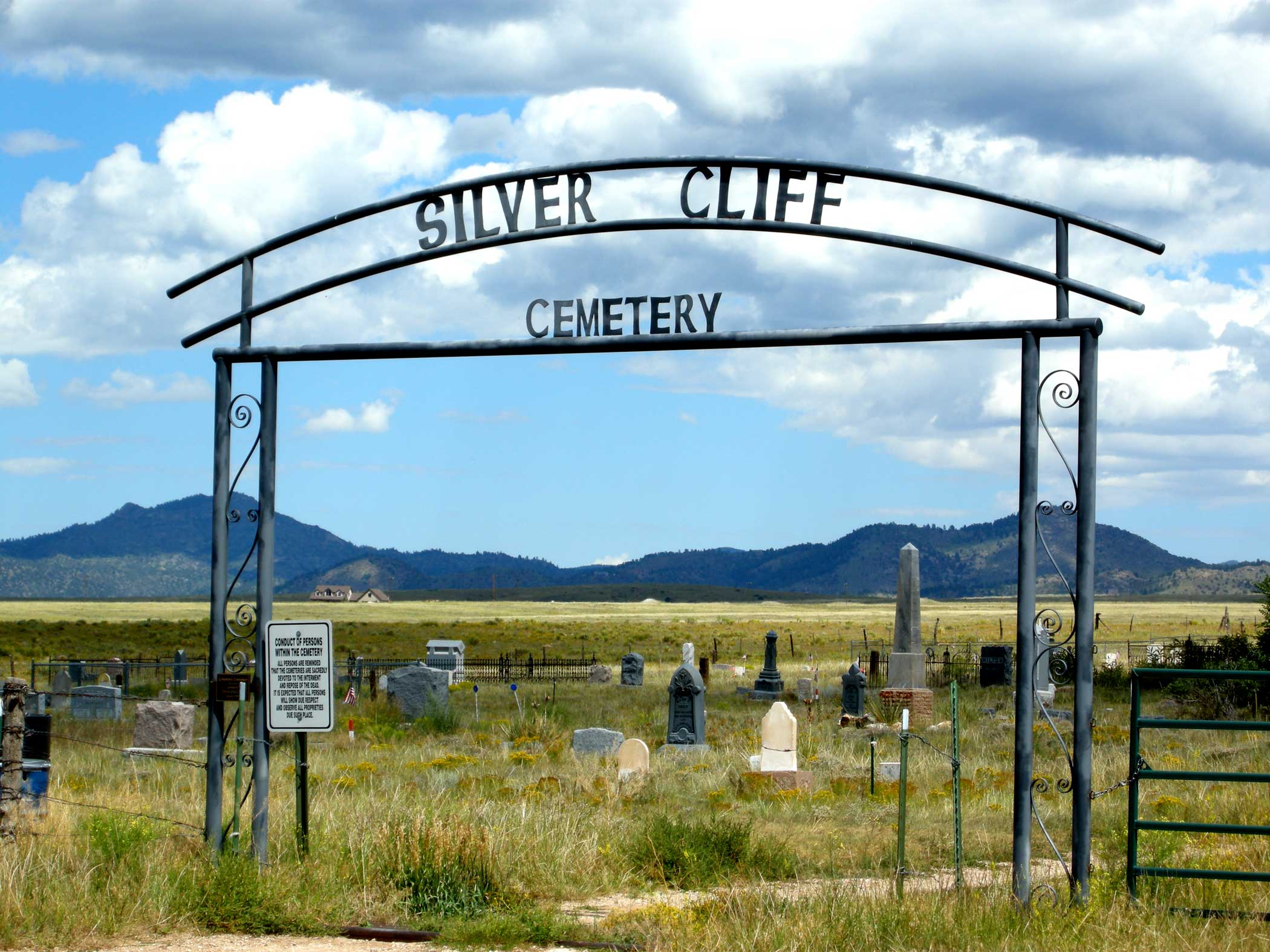
Silver Cliff Cemetery, August 2010

The median income for a household in the town was $25,000, and the median income for a family was $32,917. Males had a median income of $26,389 versus $17,109 for females. The per capita income for the town was $13,899. About 16.7% of families and 20.3% of the population were below the poverty line, including 25.3% of those under age 18 and 15.3% of those age 65 or over.

== Silver Cliff Cemetery ==
Just outside the town of Silver Cliff is Silver Cliff Cemetery, established in the early 1880s. It has been known for the mysterious lights that float around the cemetery at night.

== See also ==
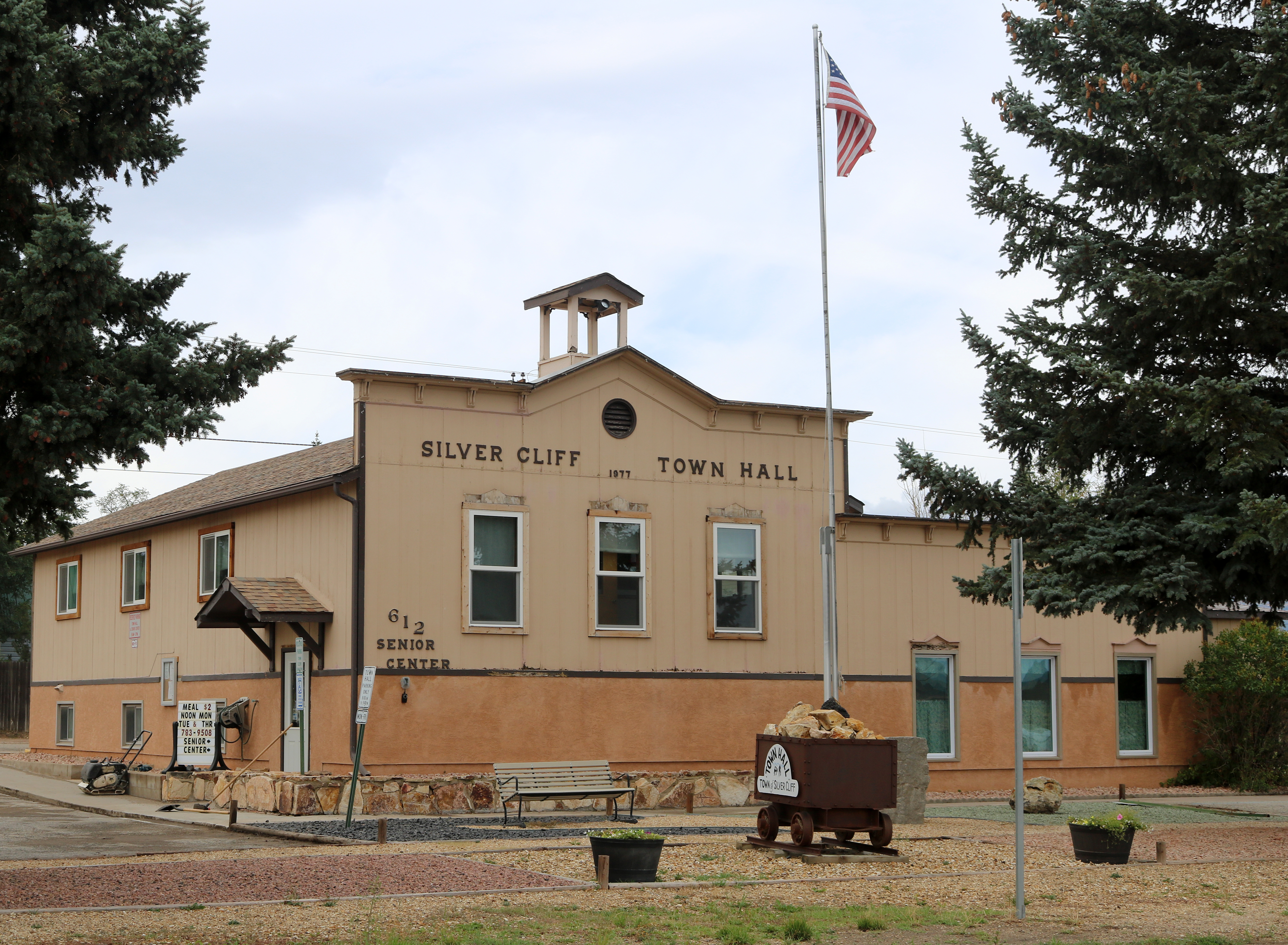
Silver Cliff Town Hall

- List of municipalities in Colorado
