= Wet Mountain Valley =

Valley in Colorado, United States

Coordinates: 38°04′00″N 105°26′32″W

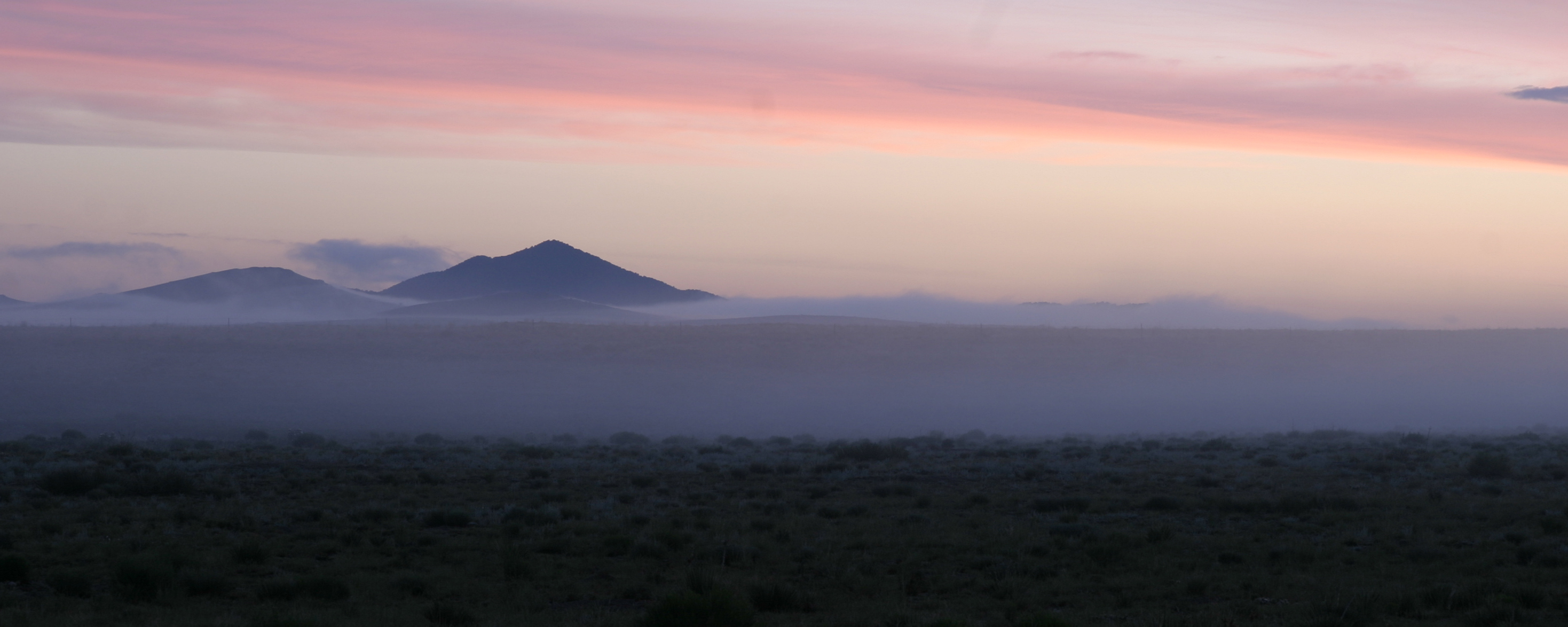
Wet Mountain Valley in a mist

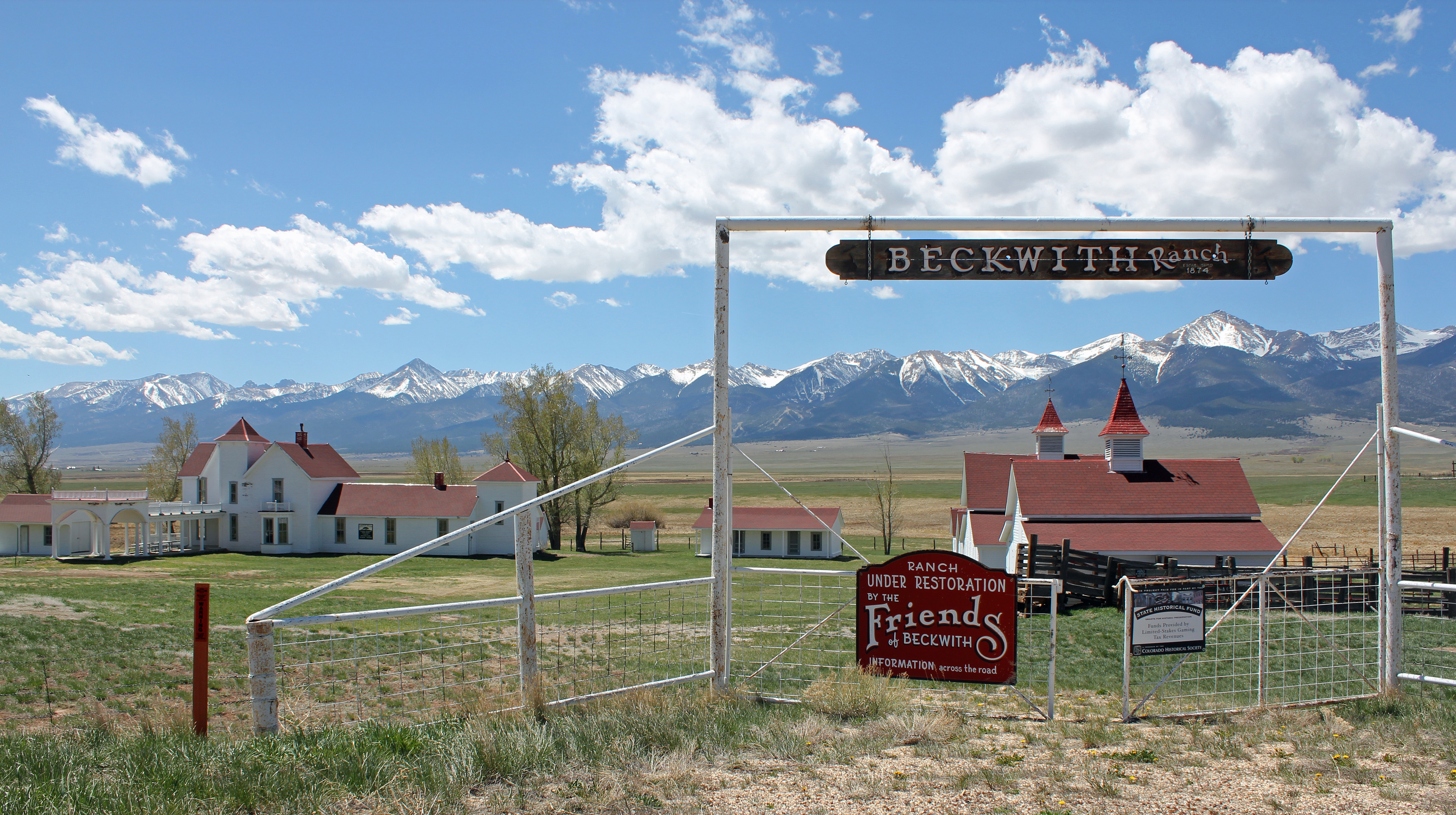
The Beckwith Ranch with the Sangre de Cristos in the background.

The Wet Mountain Valley is a high elevation mountain valley mostly located in Custer County but extending southward into Huerfano County in south-central Colorado. Westcliffe and Silver Cliff are the two towns in the valley which is mostly devoted to cattle ranching.

== Geography ==
The Wet Mountain Valley is nestled beneath the Wet Mountains on the east, and the Sangre de Cristo Range that parallels the valley on the west. Both mountain ranges are in the Sangre de Cristo Mountains system of the Southern Rocky Mountains. The valley is approximately 30 miles (48 km) long from north to south and 12 miles (19 km) wide with elevations of between 7,500 ft (2,300 m) and 9,000 ft (2,700 m).

The two towns in the valley are Westcliffe and Silver Cliff which are located side by side at an elevation of just under 8,000 feet (2,400 m). According to the U.S. census for 2020, Westcliffe has a population of 435 and Silver Cliff has a population of 609. DeWeese Reservoir is near the two towns. The valley is known for its historic ranches. Conservation easements preserve some of the ranches from sub-division and development. Silver mining attracted early settlers. The sparse remains of two former mining towns, Rosita and Querida, are 7 miles (11 km) east of Westcliffe. Both had a population of more than 1,000 people in 1880.

The valley is drained by two major creeks, both of which rise in the Sangre de Cristos. Grape Creek begins in the south of Custer County near Music Pass and flows north into DeWeese Reservoir; from there it enters a narrow gorge before reaching the Arkansas River. Texas Creek begins northwest of Westcliffe and flows to the northeast meeting the Arkansas River at US Highway 50. A small part of the valley drains southward into the Huerfano River.

In 2015, Westcliff and Silver Cliff became an International Dark Sky Community, the first in Colorado, the ninth in the world, and at the highest elevation of all dark sky communities. The designation as a dark sky community requires a local effort to limit light pollution. An observatory in Westcliffe welcomes tourists.

=== Climate ===
The Wet Mountain Valley has a Dfb climate (humid continental with warm summers and cold winters) in the Köppen Classification system and DCblo (humid continental with mild summers and cold winters) in the Trewartha climate classification system. At Westcliffe from 1948 to 2005, the warmest month was July with an average temperature of 62.9 °F (17.2 °C) and the coldest month was January with an average temperature is 23.3 °F (−4.8 °C). Precipitation was 14.44 in (367 mm) annually with the majority in the summer. Snowfall averaged 90.4 in (2,300 mm) annually. The highest elevations of the valley may have a Dfc (continental subarctic) climate. The surrounding mountains have an ET (arctic tundra) climate at elevations above about 11,500 ft (3,500 m) in elevation.
