= Querida, Colorado =

- Town
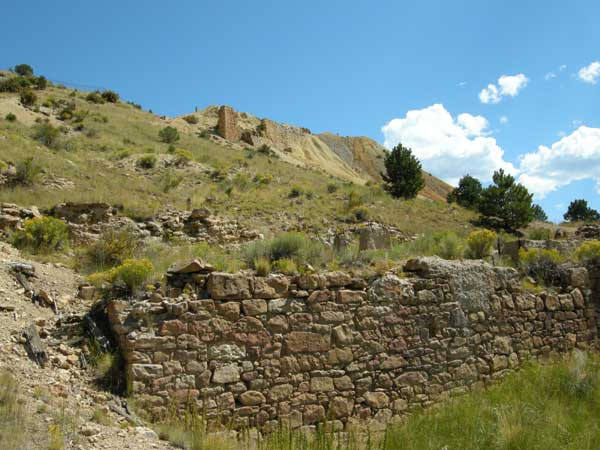
- Remains of the Bassick silver mine, Querida

- Location in Custer County and the state of Colorado Querida, Colorado (the United States)
- Coordinates: 38°07′34″N 105°20′04″W
- Country: United States
- State: Colorado
- County: Custer County

Government
  - Type: ghost town
- Elevation: 8,986 ft (2,739 m)
- Time zone: UTC-7 (MST)
  - Summer (DST): UTC-6 (MDT)
- GNIS feature ID: 0203574

Querida (also known as Bassick, Bassick City, and Bassickville) is a ghost town in Custer County, Colorado, United States. The town was built to serve the surrounding silver mines, the most important of which was the Bassick mine.

== History ==
The Querida, Colorado, post office operated from January 12, 1880, until May 14, 1906. "Querida" is a Spanish language word meaning "beloved." The Bassick, Colorado, post office then operated from May 19, 1917, until December 31, 1920.

== Geography ==
Querida is located at 38°07′34″N 105°20′04″W (38.1261125,-105.3344427). Querida is located on the eastern flanks of the Wet Mountain Valley.

== See also ==
- Bibliography of Colorado
- Geography of Colorado
- History of Colorado
- Index of Colorado-related articles
  - Wet Mountain Valley
- List of Colorado-related lists
  - List of ghost towns in Colorado
  - List of post offices in Colorado
- Outline of Colorado
