= DeWeese Reservoir =

- DeWeese-Dye Reservoir; Lake De Weese
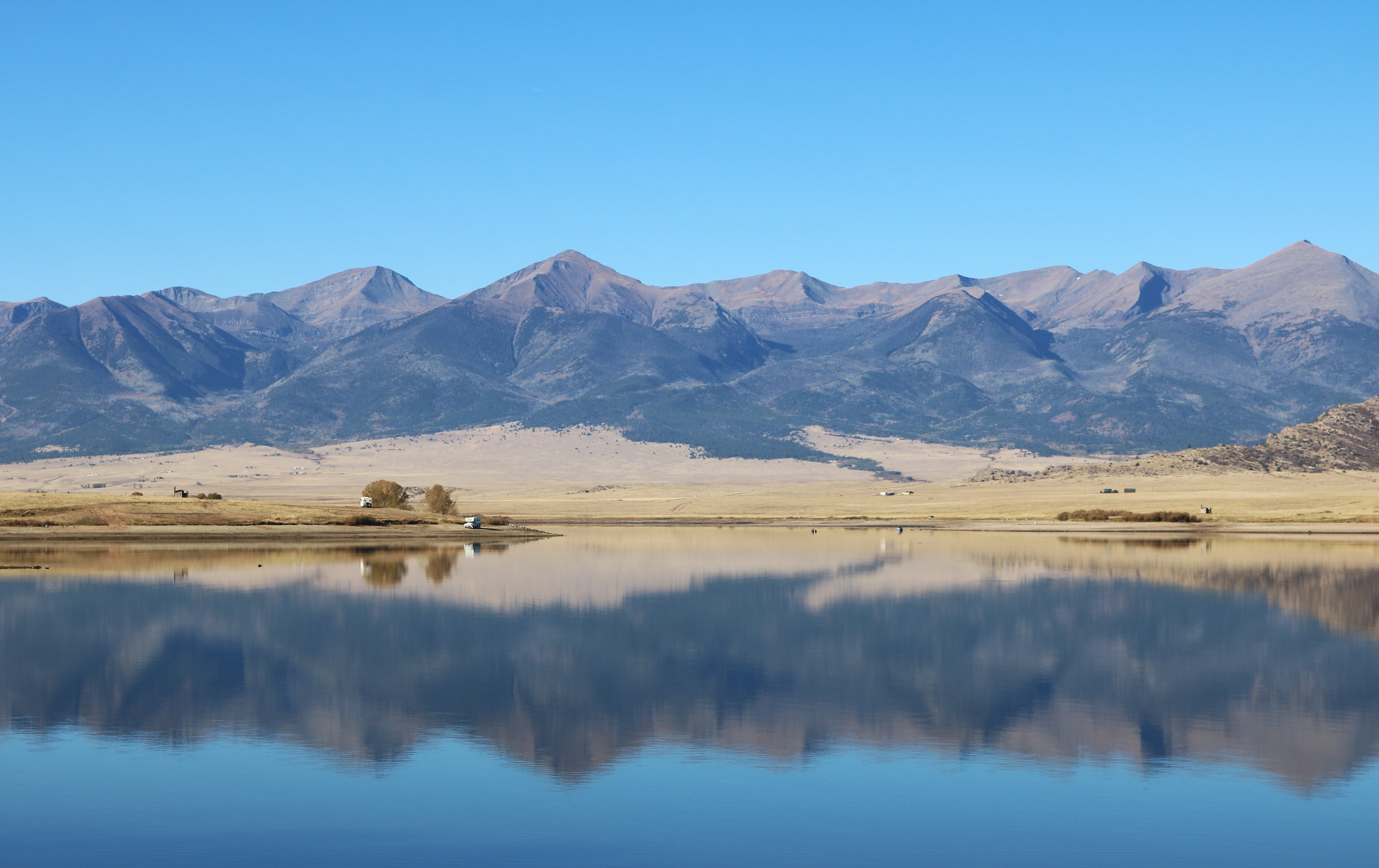
- Looking west across the reservoir towards the Sangre de Cristo Mountains

- Location in Colorado
- Location: Custer County, Colorado
- Coordinates: 38°12′9″N 105°27′48″W
- Type: reservoir
- Etymology: Named for Dall DeWeese, who along with C.R.C. Dye incorporated the DeWeese-Dye Ditch and Reservoir Company
- Primary inflows: Grape Creek
- Primary outflows: Grape Creek
- Designation: DeWeese Reservoir State Wildlife Area
- Built: 1902—1903
- First flooded: 1903
- Water volume: 3,542 acre-feet (4,369,000 cubic meters)
- Surface elevation: 7,671 feet (2,338 meters)
- Frozen: Freezes in winter
- Website: www.deweeseditch.com

DeWeese Reservoir is located in northern Custer County, Colorado between the Sangre de Cristo Mountains and the Wet Mountains. The reservoir is owned by the DeWeese-Dye Ditch and Reservoir Company, which uses the water it stores to irrigate agricultural crops around Lincoln Park and Brookside in Fremont County, Colorado.

The ditch and reservoir company owns the land under the reservoir and most of the land around it. The company has arrangements with other organizations to store water and for the use of the space. For example, it stores 500 acre-feet (620,000 cubic meters) for Colorado Parks and Wildlife, it stores 500 acre-feet (620,000 cubic meters) for the Bureau of Land Management (which also owns some land near the reservoir), and it stores some water for the Upper Arkansas Water Conservancy District and the Round Mountain Water District, a local water company.

== State wildlife area ==
The lake and the land immediately surrounding it are also designated as the DeWeese Reservoir State Wildlife Area. It offers coldwater stream and lake fishing, hunting, and picnicking, hiking, wildlife viewing, and camping.
