= Custer County, Colorado =

County in Colorado, United States

- County
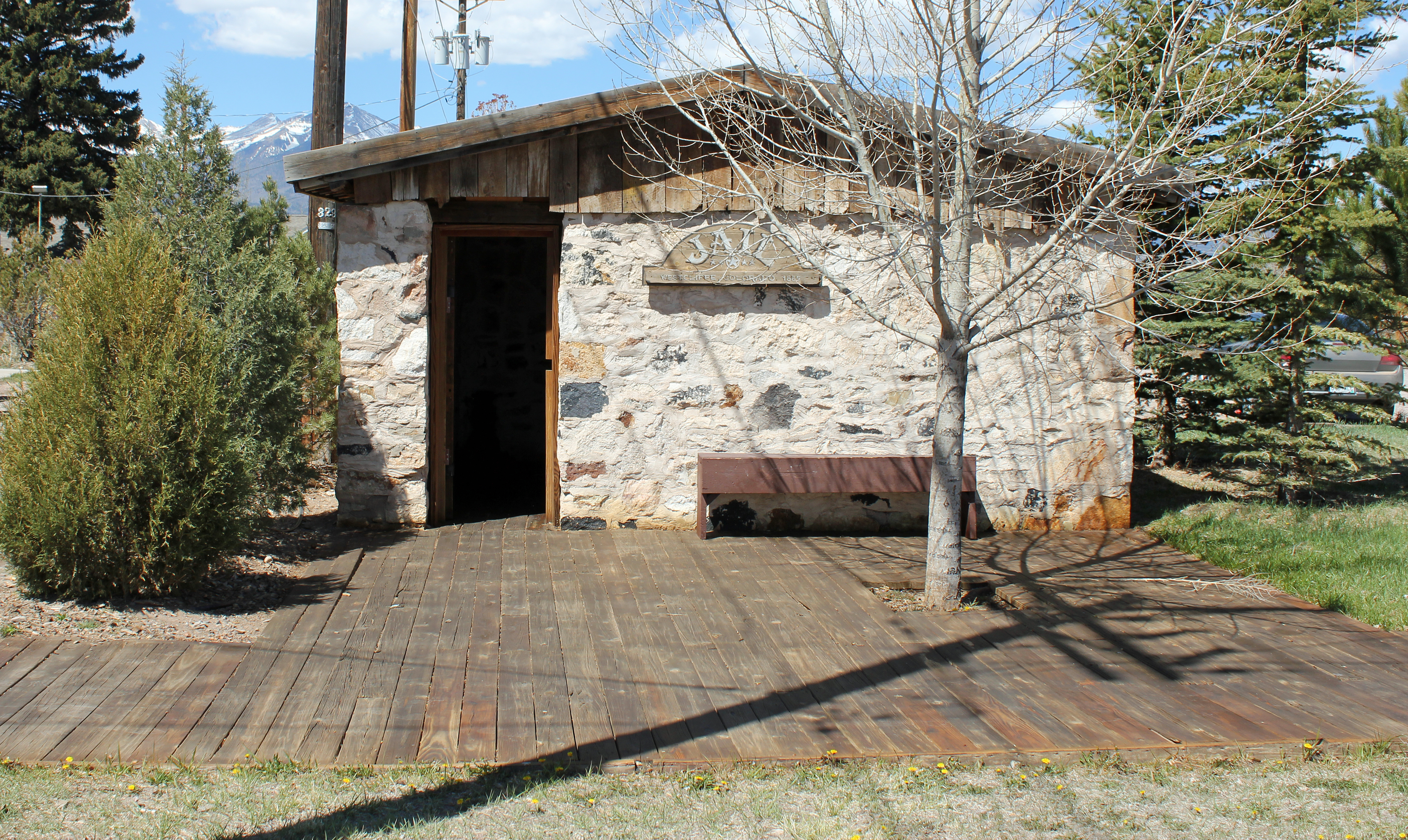
- The Westcliffe Jail is listed on the National Register of Historic Places.

- Seal

- Location within the U.S. state of Colorado
- Coordinates: 38.09°N 105.36°W
- Country: United States
- State: Colorado
- Founded: March 9, 1877
- Named for: George Armstrong Custer
- Seat: Westcliffe
- Largest town: Silver Cliff

Area
  - Total: 740 sq mi (1,900 km^{2})
  - Land: 739 sq mi (1,910 km^{2})
  - Water: 1.3 sq mi (3.4 km^{2}) 0.2%

Population (2020)
  - Total: 4,704
  - Estimate (2025): 5,590 ▲
  - Density: 7.6/sq mi (2.9/km^{2})
- Time zone: UTC−7 (Mountain)
  - Summer (DST): UTC−6 (MDT)
- Congressional district: 7th
- Website: www.custercounty-co.gov

Custer County is a county located in the U.S. state of Colorado. As of the 2020 census, the population was 4,704. The county seat is Westcliffe.

== History ==
Custer County was created by the Colorado legislature on March 9, 1877, out of the southern half of Fremont County. It was named in honor of Lt. Colonel George Armstrong Custer, who had died the previous year. Originally set in Ula, the county seat moved to Rosita in 1878, and to Silver Cliff in 1886 before settling in Westcliffe in 1928.

The county was the site of a silver rush during the 1870s. Thousands of men poured into the county during this time in the hunt for silver. Some of the notable mines include the Geyser Mine (on the north edge of the town of Silver Cliff), the Bassick Mine (near the ghost town of Querida) and the Bull Domingo (north of Silver Cliff).

During the late 19th century a railroad line was connected through the Grape Creek Canyon but was permanently closed after a few disastrous floods. The old rail house has been turned into a historical landmark in the town of Westcliffe.

After the mines were exhausted, the population dropped considerably and was replaced by cattle ranchers. An extensive system of irrigation ditches was built throughout the valley. Ranching in the Wet Mountain Valley continues to this day.

== Geography ==
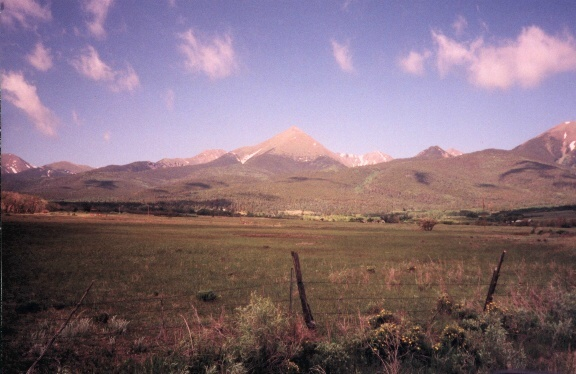
The Wet Mountain Valley of Custer County is nestled beneath the rugged Sangre de Cristo Mountains

According to the U.S. Census Bureau, the county has a total area of 740 square miles (1,900 km^{2}), of which 739 square miles (1,910 km^{2}) is land and 1.3 square miles (3.4 km^{2}) (0.2%) is water.

The county is very rugged and would be virtually inaccessible without roads. The lowest point of the county is around 6,000 feet (1,800 m) in elevation, but most of the county is rugged and mountainous. The county seat of Westcliffe is about 7,800 feet (2,400 m) and along with nearby town Silver Cliff lies in the Wet Mountain Valley which sits at the base of the Sangre de Cristo Mountains. The peaks of the Sangre de Cristo Mountains to the west reach heights in excess of 14,000 feet (4,300 m) with Crestone Peak being the highest at 14,294 feet (4,357 m) and 7th highest fourteener in Colorado.

A large percentage of the county is National Forest land in the Sangre de Cristo Mountains on the west side and in the Wet Mountains on the east. The only lake of size is the DeWeese Reservoir in the north end of the Wet Mountain Valley.

=== Adjacent counties ===
- Fremont County - north
- Pueblo County - east
- Huerfano County - southeast
- Saguache County - west

=== Major highways ===
- State Highway 67
- State Highway 69
- State Highway 78
- State Highway 96
- State Highway 165

=== National protected areas ===
- San Isabel National Forest
- Sangre de Cristo Wilderness
- Frontier Pathways National Scenic and Historic Byway

=== Bicycle trails ===
- TransAmerica Trail Bicycle Route
- Western Express Bicycle Route

== Demographics ==
Historical population
Census	Pop.	Note	%±
1880	8,080		—
1890	2,970		−63.2%
1900	2,937		−1.1%
1910	1,947		−33.7%
1920	2,172		11.6%
1930	2,124		−2.2%
1940	2,270		6.9%
1950	1,573		−30.7%
1960	1,305		−17.0%
1970	1,120		−14.2%
1980	1,528		36.4%
1990	1,926		26.0%
2000	3,503		81.9%
2010	4,255		21.5%
2020	4,704		10.6%
2025 (est.)	5,590	▲	18.8%
U.S. Decennial Census; 1790-1960 1900-90; 1990-2000 2010-20 2025

=== 2020 census ===
As of the 2020 census, the county had a population of 4,704. Of the residents, 15.1% were under the age of 18 and 33.8% were 65 years of age or older; the median age was 58.3 years. For every 100 females there were 100.1 males, and for every 100 females age 18 and over there were 100.2 males. 0.0% of residents lived in urban areas and 100.0% lived in rural areas.

Custer County, Colorado – Racial and ethnic composition Note: the US Census treats Hispanic/Latino as an ethnic category. This table excludes Latinos from the racial categories and assigns them to a separate category. Hispanics/Latinos may be of any race.
Race / Ethnicity (NH = Non-Hispanic)	Pop 2000	Pop 2010	Pop 2020	% 2000	% 2010	% 2020
White alone (NH)	3,299	3,914	4,212	94.18%	91.99%	89.54%
Black or African American alone (NH)	12	41	10	0.34%	0.96%	0.21%
Native American or Alaska Native alone (NH)	37	23	42	1.06%	0.54%	0.89%
Asian alone (NH)	10	16	22	0.29%	0.38%	0.47%
Pacific Islander alone (NH)	0	0	0	0.00%	0.00%	0.00%
Other race alone (NH)	3	5	45	0.09%	0.12%	0.96%
Mixed race or Multiracial (NH)	54	56	195	1.54%	1.32%	4.15%
Hispanic or Latino (any race)	88	200	178	2.51%	4.70%	3.78%
Total	3,503	4,255	4,704	100.00%	100.00%	100.00%

The racial makeup of the county was 91.0% White, 0.2% Black or African American, 1.1% American Indian and Alaska Native, 0.5% Asian, 0.0% Native Hawaiian and Pacific Islander, 1.7% from some other race, and 5.5% from two or more races. Hispanic or Latino residents of any race comprised 3.8% of the population.

There were 2,219 households in the county, of which 16.2% had children under the age of 18 living with them and 19.0% had a female householder with no spouse or partner present. About 29.3% of all households were made up of individuals and 14.1% had someone living alone who was 65 years of age or older.

There were 4,175 housing units, of which 46.9% were vacant. Among occupied housing units, 82.4% were owner-occupied and 17.6% were renter-occupied. The homeowner vacancy rate was 3.9% and the rental vacancy rate was 12.0%.

=== 2000 census ===
As of the 2000 census, there were 3,503 people, 1,480 households, and 1,077 families living in the county. The population density was 5 people per square mile (1.9 people/km^{2}). There were 2,989 housing units at an average density of 4 units per square mile (1.5 units/km^{2}).

The racial makeup of the county was 95.89% White, 0.37% Black or African American, 1.11% Native American, 0.29% Asian, 0.71% from other races, and 1.63% from two or more races. 2.51% of the population were Hispanic or Latino of any race.

There were 1,480 households, out of which 25.50% had children under the age of 18 living with them, 64.60% were married couples living together, 5.40% had a female householder with no husband present, and 27.20% were non-families. 23.80% of all households were made up of individuals, and 7.90% had someone living alone who was 65 years of age or older. The average household size was 2.36 and the average family size was 2.77.

In the county, the population was spread out, with 22.50% under the age of 18, 4.50% from 18 to 24, 23.30% from 25 to 44, 35.00% from 45 to 64, and 14.80% who were 65 years of age or older. The median age was 45 years. For every 100 females there were 104.30 males. For every 100 females age 18 and over, there were 102.00 males.

The median income for a household in the county was $34,731, and the median income for a family was $41,198. Males had a median income of $32,460 versus $20,868 for females. The per capita income for the county was $19,817. About 9.80% of families and 13.30% of the population were below the poverty line, including 20.10% of those under age 18 and 12.60% of those age 65 or over.

=== Income trends ===
Median household income (adjusted for inflation) dropped from $49,184 in 2009 to $32,261 in 2014, which made the county the third worst performing county in this respect in the country.

== Government ==
The county is governed by three county commissioners who are elected to 4-year terms with a term limit of two. In 2023, the county was represented by:

-District 1: Bill Canda (Republican), serving from 2022 to 2026. 2nd term

-District 2: Paul Vogelsong (Republican), serving from 2024 to 2028. 1st term.

-District 3: Lucas Epp (Republican), serving from 2024 to 2028. 1st term.

There are several other public offices including Coroner, Sheriff, County Clerk and others.

== Politics ==
Custer County is overall very conservative and heavily Republican. The most important election is not the general election, but the primary election between members of the Republican Party in August. During the 2004 presidential election, well over 60% of Custer County voters voted for the Republican candidates including George W. Bush and Pete Coors.

United States presidential election results for Custer County, Colorado
Year	Republican		Democratic		Third party(ies)	
Year	No.	%	No.	%	No.	%
1880	1,297	54.18%	1,061	44.32%	36	1.50%
1884	812	58.67%	567	40.97%	5	0.36%
1888	574	60.10%	374	39.16%	7	0.73%
1892	296	43.27%	0	0.00%	388	56.73%
1896	167	14.41%	986	85.07%	6	0.52%
1900	510	36.93%	870	63.00%	1	0.07%
1904	587	48.47%	612	50.54%	12	0.99%
1908	499	46.94%	555	52.21%	9	0.85%
1912	347	34.98%	510	51.41%	135	13.61%
1916	403	41.38%	529	54.31%	42	4.31%
1920	560	63.28%	289	32.66%	36	4.07%
1924	429	44.41%	281	29.09%	256	26.50%
1928	600	58.88%	389	38.17%	30	2.94%
1932	413	34.45%	729	60.80%	57	4.75%
1936	526	43.11%	674	55.25%	20	1.64%
1940	685	57.37%	495	41.46%	14	1.17%
1944	601	63.73%	333	35.31%	9	0.95%
1948	547	58.01%	384	40.72%	12	1.27%
1952	662	73.64%	231	25.70%	6	0.67%
1956	534	66.83%	264	33.04%	1	0.13%
1960	509	61.85%	314	38.15%	0	0.00%
1964	358	46.68%	406	52.93%	3	0.39%
1968	433	60.47%	204	28.49%	79	11.03%
1972	495	71.43%	154	22.22%	44	6.35%
1976	491	62.39%	259	32.91%	37	4.70%
1980	674	66.73%	231	22.87%	105	10.40%
1984	832	76.12%	241	22.05%	20	1.83%
1988	753	69.46%	310	28.60%	21	1.94%
1992	651	47.35%	343	24.95%	381	27.71%
1996	920	58.90%	412	26.38%	230	14.72%
2000	1,451	68.74%	507	24.02%	153	7.25%
2004	1,657	68.25%	739	30.44%	32	1.32%
2008	1,672	63.60%	912	34.69%	45	1.71%
2012	1,788	65.86%	868	31.97%	59	2.17%
2016	2,061	67.22%	797	25.99%	208	6.78%
2020	2,474	68.06%	1,112	30.59%	49	1.35%
2024	2,583	66.80%	1,188	30.72%	96	2.48%

United States Senate election results for Custer County, Colorado2
Year	Republican		Democratic		Third party(ies)	
Year	No.	%	No.	%	No.	%
2020	2,456	68.34%	1,059	29.47%	79	2.20%

United States Senate election results for Custer County, Colorado3
Year	Republican		Democratic		Third party(ies)	
Year	No.	%	No.	%	No.	%
2022	2,112	63.46%	1,061	31.88%	155	4.66%

Colorado Gubernatorial election results for Custer County
Year	Republican		Democratic		Third party(ies)	
Year	No.	%	No.	%	No.	%
2022	2,103	62.95%	1,140	34.12%	98	2.93%

Despite the surface appearance of a homogeneous political culture, there is considerable dispute among residents over planning. One segment of residents (which includes ranchers) would like to see the County preserved in its present state as a mountain paradise with its rural ranching culture, with strict limitation on development. Proponents are sometimes seen as "anti-growth" and "anti-property rights." Another segment of the population would like to see less government and less restrictions on growth and development for the growth of business and the economy. Proponents are seen as "anti-environment" or "anti-agriculture."

== Communities ==
=== Towns ===
- Silver Cliff
- Westcliffe (County seat)

=== Unincorporated communities ===
- Cold Spring
- Fairview
- Greenwood
- McKenzie Junction
- San Isabel
- Tanglewood Acres
- Wetmore

=== Ghost towns ===
- Colfax
- Galena
- Querida
- Rosita
- Ula

== See also ==
- Bibliography of Colorado
- Geography of Colorado
- History of Colorado
  - National Register of Historic Places listings in Custer County, Colorado
- Index of Colorado-related articles
- List of Colorado-related lists
  - List of counties in Colorado
- Outline of Colorado
