= Westcliffe, Colorado =

Town in Colorado, United States

- Town
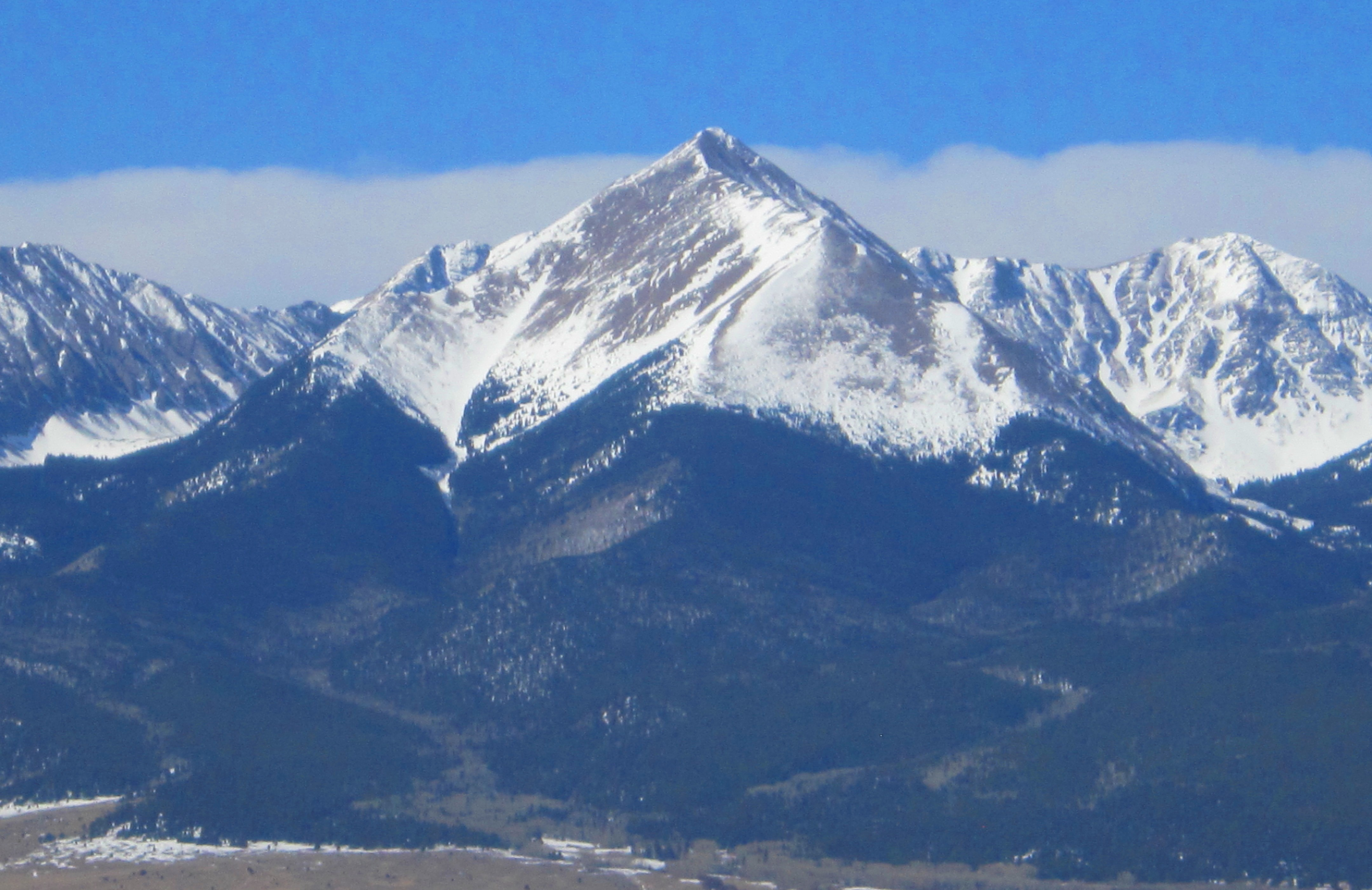
- Horn Peak of the Sangre de Cristo Range viewed from Westcliffe

- Location of Westcliffe in Custer County, Colorado.
- Coordinates: 38°07′48″N 105°27′45″W
- Country: United States
- State: State of Colorado
- County: Custer
- Incorporated: November 21, 1887

Government
  - Type: Statutory town
  - Mayor: Paul Wenke

Area
  - Total: 1.24 sq mi (3.20 km^{2})
  - Land: 1.24 sq mi (3.20 km^{2})
  - Water: 0 sq mi (0.00 km^{2})
- Elevation: 7,871 ft (2,399 m)

Population (2020)
  - Total: 435
  - Density: 352/sq mi (136/km^{2})
- Time zone: UTC-7 (Mountain (MST))
  - Summer (DST): UTC-6 (MDT)
- ZIP code: 81252
- Area code: 719
- FIPS code: 08-83450
- GNIS feature ID: 2413471
- Website: townofwestcliffe.colorado.gov

Westcliffe is a statutory town that is the county seat of Custer County, Colorado, United States. As of the 2020 census, Westcliffe had a population of 435.

== History ==
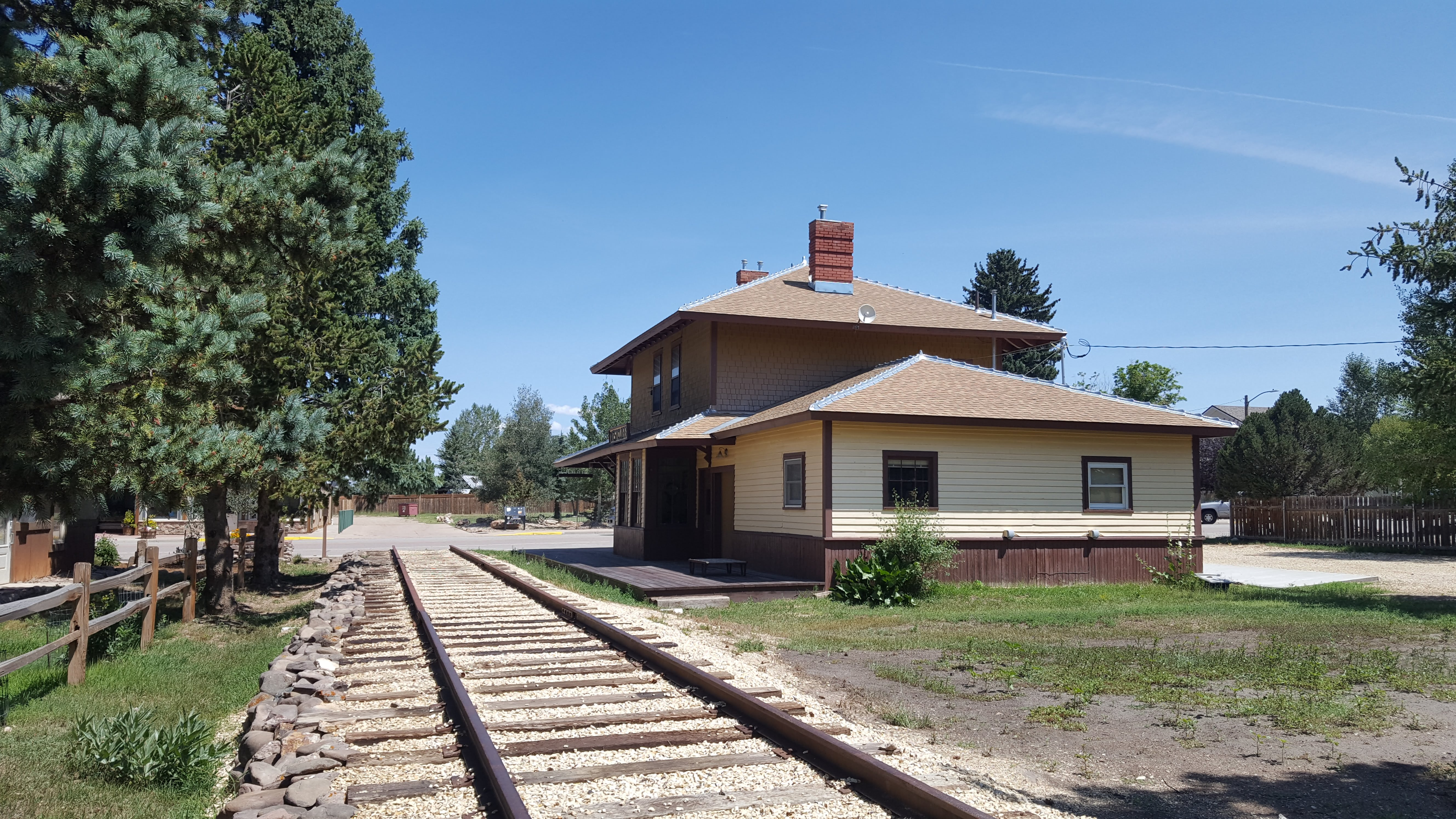
The restored D&RGW depot in August 2022

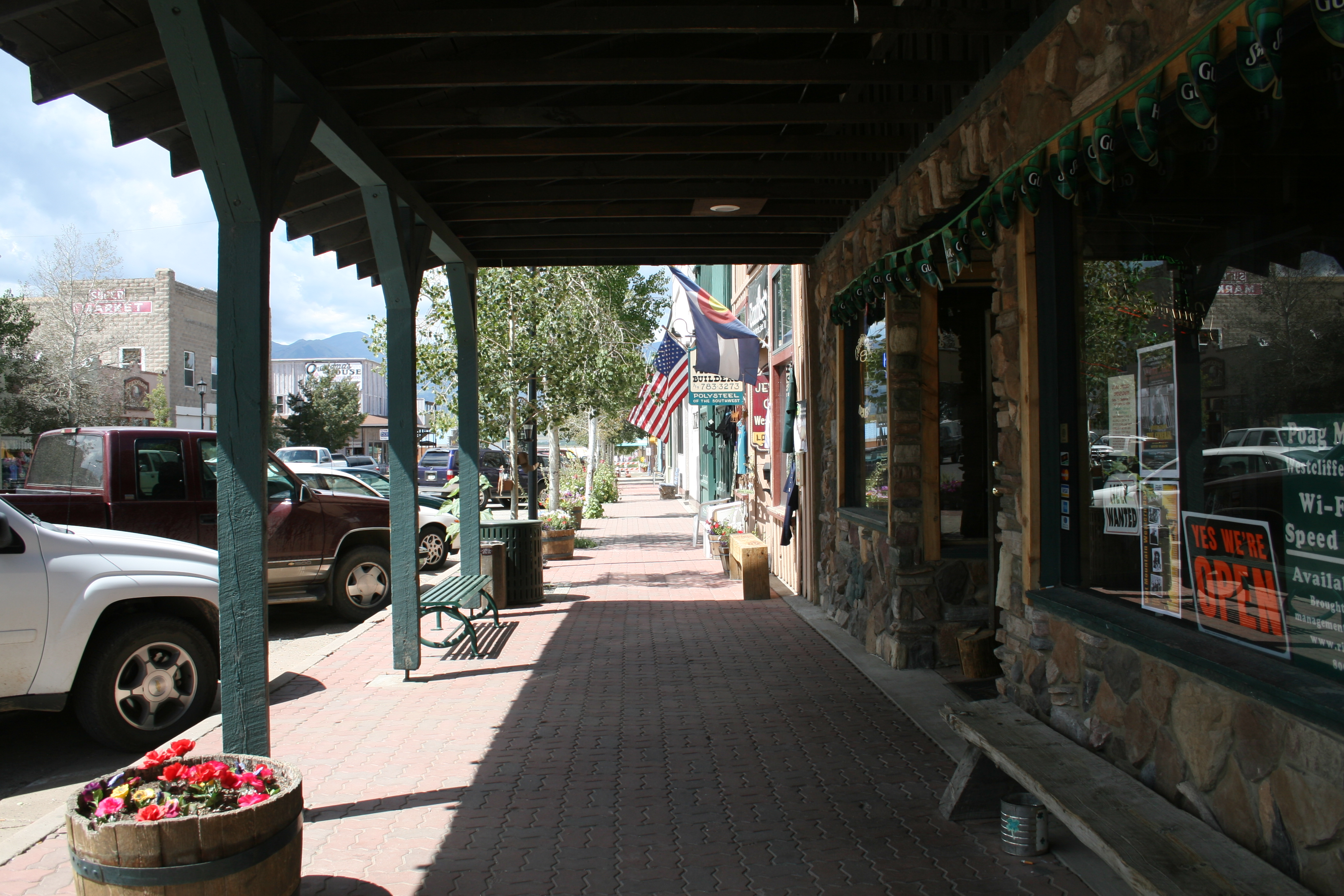
Shopping lane in downtown Westcliffe

Westcliffe had its start in 1881 when the Denver and Rio Grande Western Railroad was extended to that point. The town was originally named Clifton but was later renamed Westcliffe after Westcliffe-on-Sea, England, by William Abraham Bell, a businessman who owned a large amount of land in the area.

== Geography ==
Westcliffe is located west of the geographic center of Custer County in the Wet Mountain Valley, between the Wet Mountains to the east and the Sangre de Cristo Range to the west. The town of Silver Cliff is immediately to the east of Westcliffe.

According to the United States Census Bureau, the town has a total area of 1.2 square miles (3.2 km^{2}), all of it land.

=== Climate ===
Climate data for Westcliffe, Colorado, 1991–2020 normals, extremes 1895–present
Month	Jan	Feb	Mar	Apr	May	Jun	Jul	Aug	Sep	Oct	Nov	Dec	Year
Record high °F (°C)	65 (18)	69 (21)	74 (23)	78 (26)	88 (31)	95 (35)	96 (36)	94 (34)	90 (32)	82 (28)	79 (26)	72 (22)	96 (36)
Mean maximum °F (°C)	55.3 (12.9)	56.5 (13.6)	64.6 (18.1)	70.4 (21.3)	78.4 (25.8)	86.3 (30.2)	88.1 (31.2)	85.1 (29.5)	81.4 (27.4)	74.9 (23.8)	64.4 (18.0)	56.2 (13.4)	88.9 (31.6)
Mean daily maximum °F (°C)	39.6 (4.2)	41.7 (5.4)	49.6 (9.8)	56.4 (13.6)	65.8 (18.8)	76.9 (24.9)	80.6 (27.0)	78.0 (25.6)	72.4 (22.4)	61.3 (16.3)	48.9 (9.4)	39.8 (4.3)	59.2 (15.1)
Daily mean °F (°C)	23.9 (−4.5)	26.9 (−2.8)	34.6 (1.4)	41.0 (5.0)	49.5 (9.7)	58.7 (14.8)	62.8 (17.1)	61.1 (16.2)	54.7 (12.6)	43.7 (6.5)	32.8 (0.4)	23.9 (−4.5)	42.8 (6.0)
Mean daily minimum °F (°C)	8.3 (−13.2)	12.1 (−11.1)	19.6 (−6.9)	25.7 (−3.5)	33.3 (0.7)	40.6 (4.8)	44.9 (7.2)	44.1 (6.7)	37.0 (2.8)	26.1 (−3.3)	16.7 (−8.5)	8.0 (−13.3)	26.4 (−3.1)
Mean minimum °F (°C)	−13.7 (−25.4)	−12.6 (−24.8)	−3.1 (−19.5)	5.2 (−14.9)	19.8 (−6.8)	30.3 (−0.9)	37.9 (3.3)	35.8 (2.1)	23.9 (−4.5)	5.6 (−14.7)	−7.6 (−22.0)	−15.9 (−26.6)	−19.8 (−28.8)
Record low °F (°C)	−41 (−41)	−46 (−43)	−31 (−35)	−25 (−32)	−2 (−19)	17 (−8)	25 (−4)	20 (−7)	4 (−16)	−12 (−24)	−29 (−34)	−39 (−39)	−46 (−43)
Average precipitation inches (mm)	0.48 (12)	0.58 (15)	1.06 (27)	1.56 (40)	1.41 (36)	0.79 (20)	2.66 (68)	1.98 (50)	0.90 (23)	0.95 (24)	0.69 (18)	0.53 (13)	13.59 (346)
Average snowfall inches (cm)	8.4 (21)	10.4 (26)	15.0 (38)	19.6 (50)	4.3 (11)	0.0 (0.0)	0.0 (0.0)	0.0 (0.0)	0.9 (2.3)	8.4 (21)	8.5 (22)	8.8 (22)	84.3 (213.3)
Average precipitation days (≥ 0.01 in)	3.7	4.7	6.6	6.8	6.9	5.8	11.6	11.6	5.9	5.1	4.1	4.3	77.1
Average snowy days (≥ 0.1 in)	3.7	4.6	5.7	4.4	1.2	0.0	0.0	0.0	0.3	1.8	3.4	4.1	29.2
Source 1: NOAA
Source 2: National Weather Service

=== Dark skies ===
Westcliffe, and neighboring Silver Cliff, Colorado, are recognized as IDA International Dark Sky Communities by The International Dark-Sky Association. Gentle persuasion has resulted in residents and business in the towns and surrounding ranch land reducing the amount of light pollution.

Locals have set up a free observatory in an old period building with a "roll-off" roof to open up the 14-inch Schmidt-Cassegrain telescope with computer-guided pointing and tracking to the skies overhead. Named the Smokey Jack Observatory, it was built in 2015.

== Demographics ==
Historical population
Census	Pop.	Note	%±
1890	192		—
1900	256		33.3%
1910	232		−9.4%
1920	338		45.7%
1930	335		−0.9%
1940	429		28.1%
1950	390		−9.1%
1960	306		−21.5%
1970	243		−20.6%
1980	324		33.3%
1990	312		−3.7%
2000	417		33.7%
2010	568		36.2%
2020	435		−23.4%

== Notable people ==
- Gordon Clark (1902–1985), philosopher and theologian, buried near Westcliffe
- Anne Kimbell (1932–2017), actress and founder of the Westcliffe Center for the Performing Arts
- Adolph Treidler (1886–1981), artist, born in Westcliffe

== See also ==
- Custer County, Colorado
