= National Register of Historic Places listings in Colorado =

Colorado counties

There are more than 1,500 properties and historic districts in the U.S. State of Colorado listed on the National Register of Historic Places. They are distributed over 63 of Colorado's 64 counties; only the City and County of Broomfield currently has none.

Contents: Counties in Colorado (links in italic lead to a new page)
Adams - Alamosa - Arapahoe - Archuleta - Baca - Bent - Boulder - Broomfield - Chaffee - Cheyenne - Clear Creek - Conejos - Costilla - Crowley - Custer - Delta - Denver - Dolores - Douglas - Eagle - El Paso - Elbert - Fremont - Garfield - Gilpin - Grand - Gunnison - Hinsdale - Huerfano - Jackson - Jefferson - Kiowa - Kit Carson - La Plata - Lake - Larimer - Las Animas - Lincoln - Logan - Mesa - Mineral - Moffat - Montezuma - Montrose - Morgan - Otero - Ouray - Park - Phillips - Pitkin - Prowers - Pueblo - Rio Blanco - Rio Grande - Routt - Saguache - San Juan - San Miguel - Sedgwick - Summit - Teller - Washington - Weld - Yuma

This National Park Service list is complete through NPS recent listings posted October 30, 2026.

== Current listings by county ==
The following are approximate tallies of current listings by county. These counts are based on entries in the National Register Information Database as of April 24, 2008 and new weekly listings posted since then on the National Register of Historic Places web site. There are frequent additions to the listings and occasional delistings and the counts here are approximate and not official. New entries are added to the official Register on a weekly basis. Also, the counts in this table exclude boundary increase and decrease listings which modify the area covered by an existing property or district and which carry a separate National Register reference number. The numbers of NRHP listings in each county are documented by tables in each of the individual county list-articles.

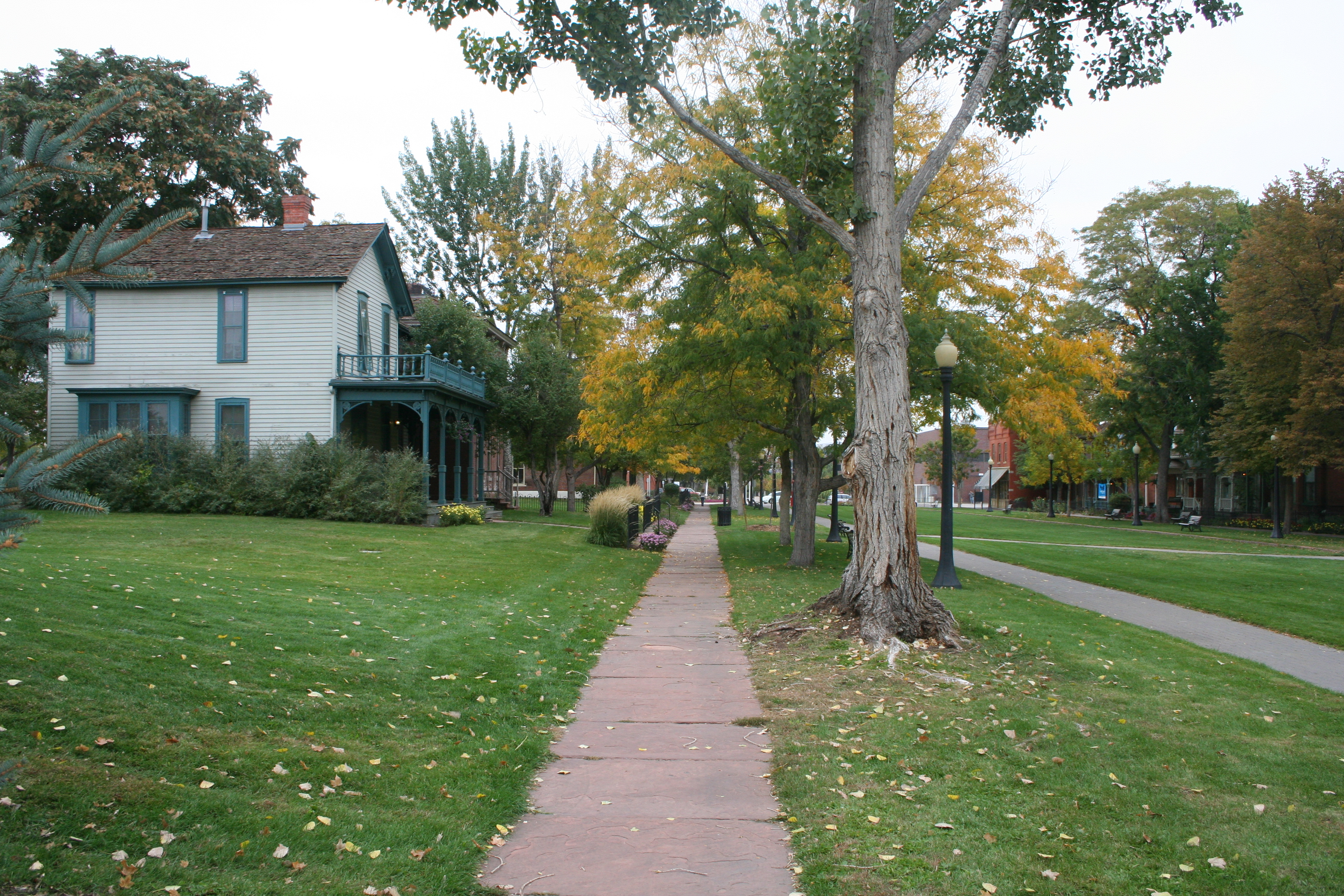
Auraria 9th Street Historic District in Denver County

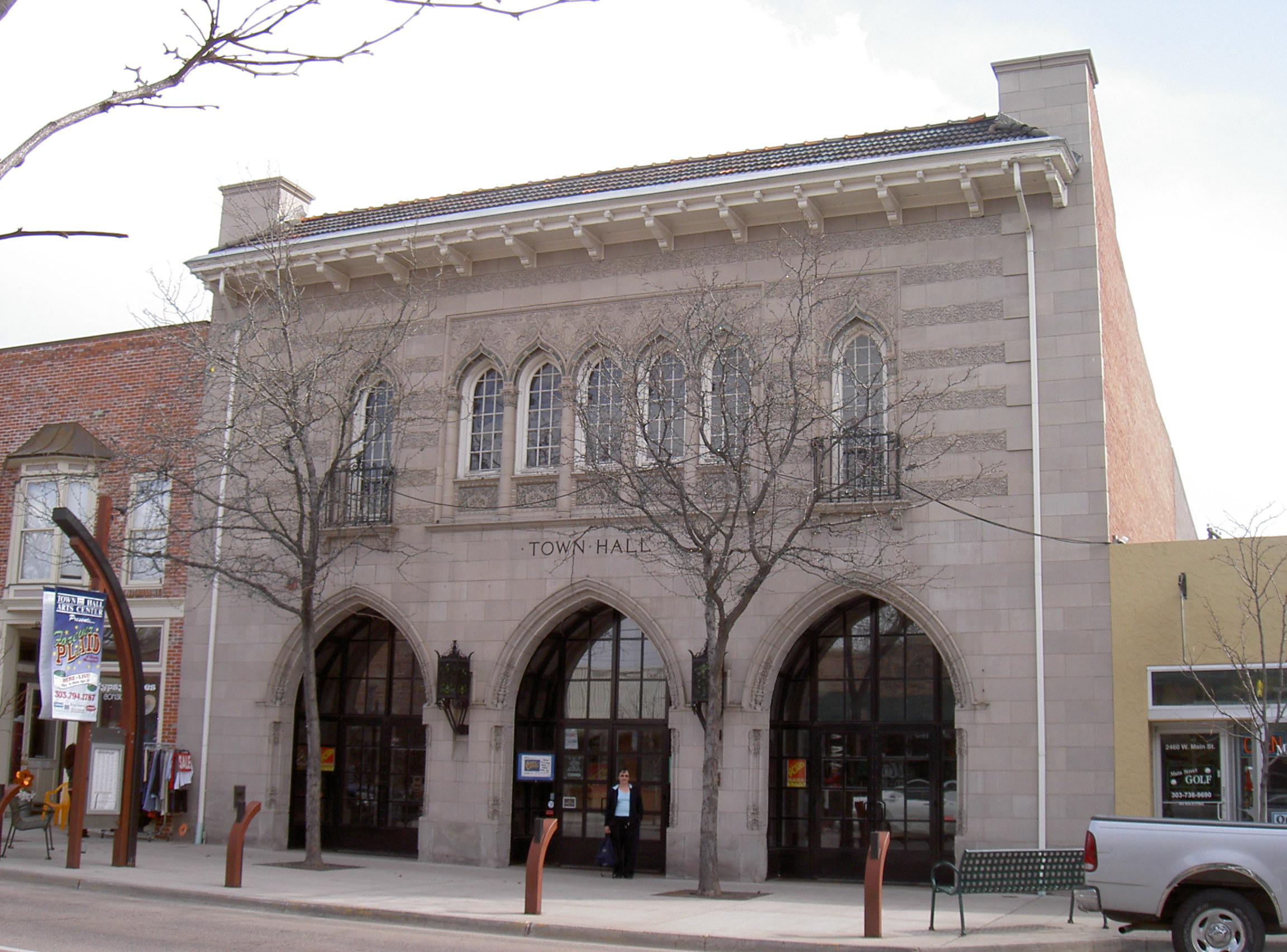
Littleton Town Hall, Arapahoe County

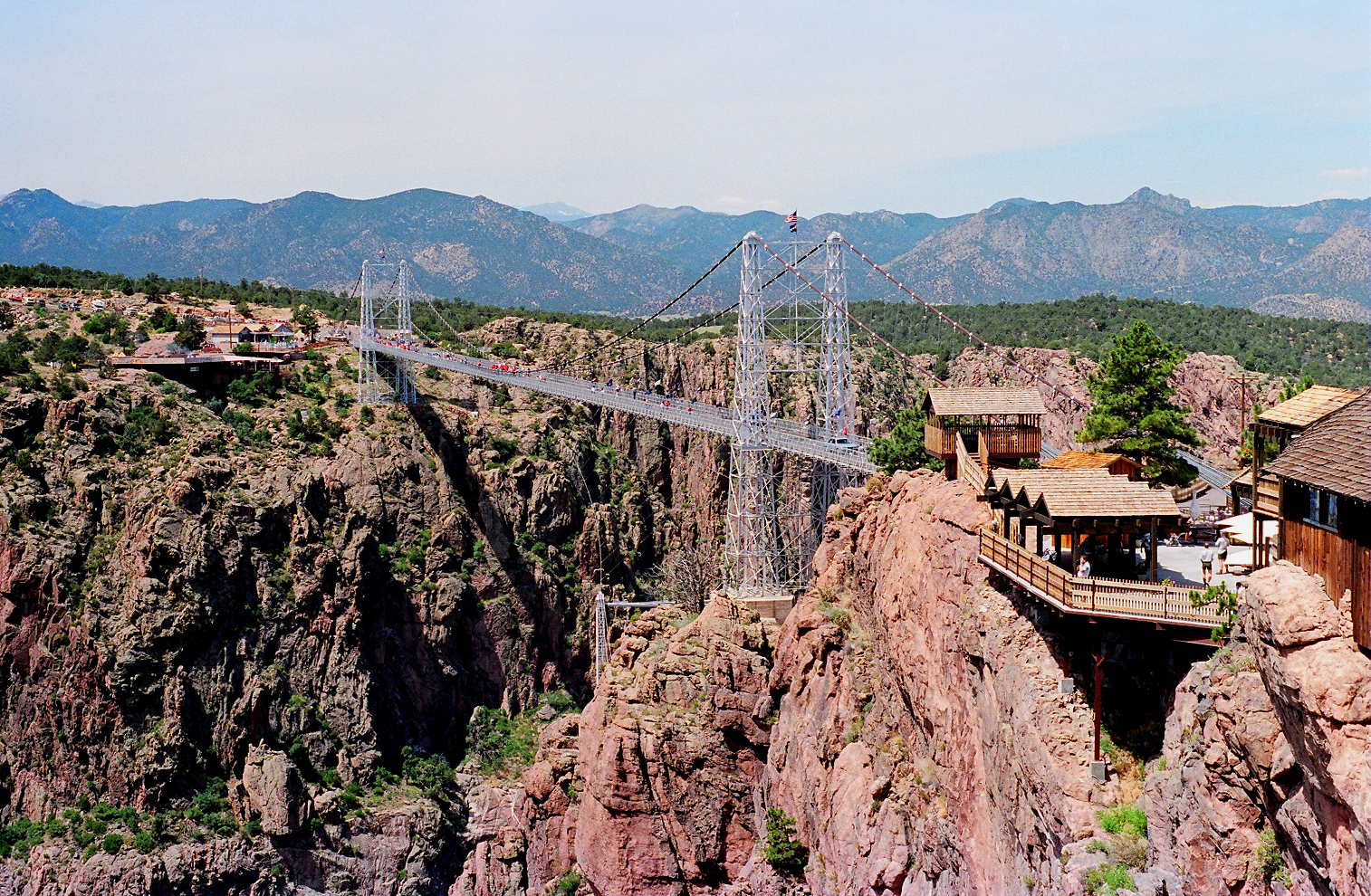
Royal Gorge Bridge, Fremont County

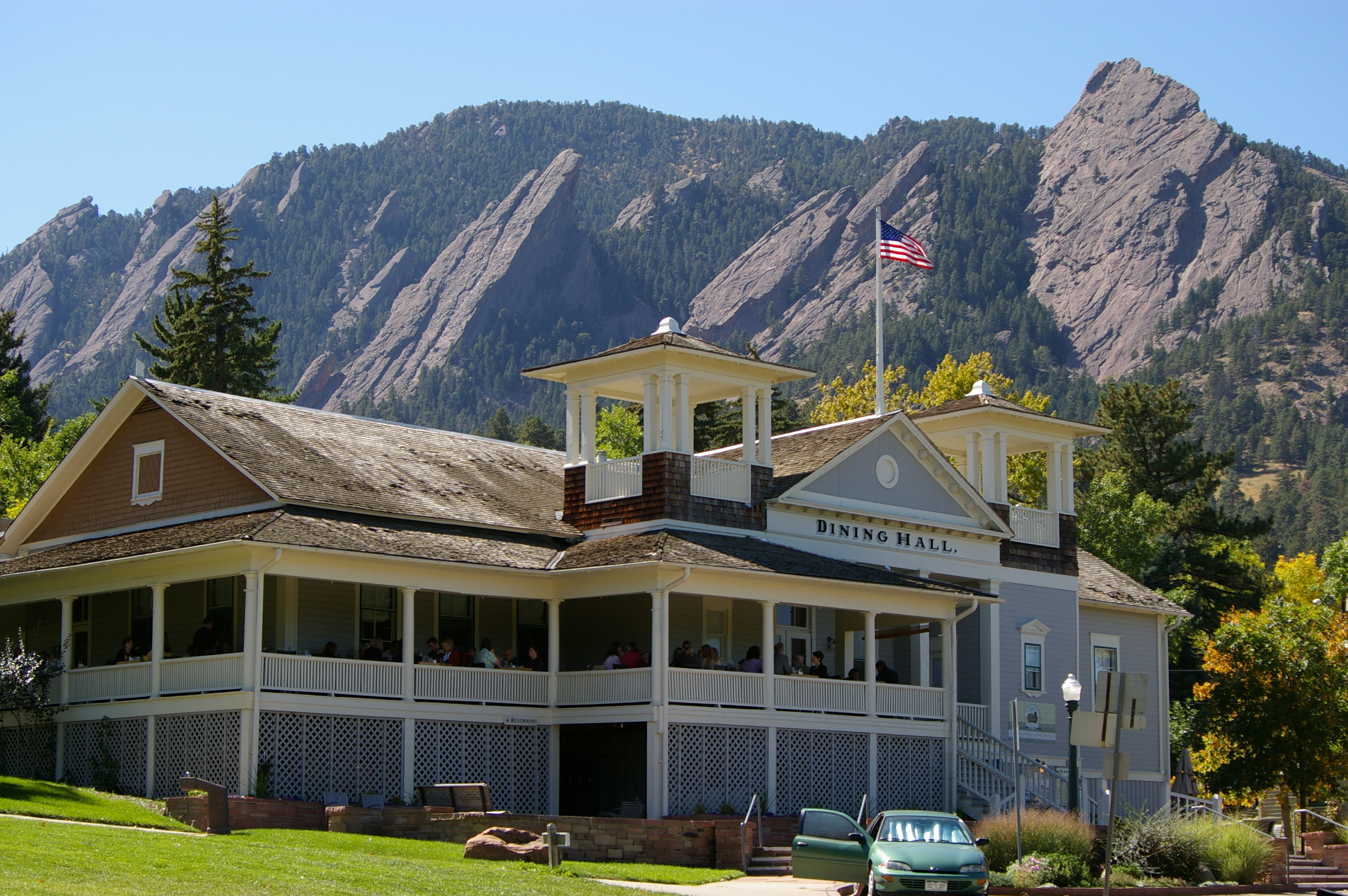
Colorado Chautauqua, Boulder County

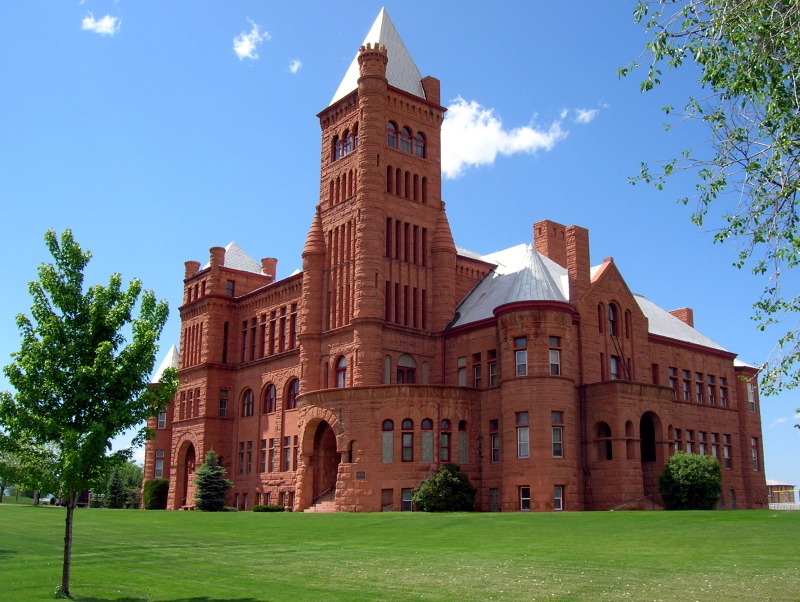
Westminster University, Adams County

	County	# of Sites
1	Adams	20
2	Alamosa	16
3	Arapahoe	26
4	Archuleta	3
5	Baca	4
6	Bent	8
7	Boulder	90
8	Broomfield	0
9	Chaffee	48
10	Cheyenne	2
11	Clear Creek	25
12	Conejos	15
13	Costilla	14
14	Crowley	1
15	Custer	10
16	Delta	17
17.1	Denver: Downtown	159
17.2	Denver: Northeast	76
17.3	Denver: Southeast	49
17.4	Denver: West	50
17.5	Denver: Duplicates	(6)
17.6	Denver: Total	328
18	Dolores	5
19	Douglas	29
20	Eagle	12
21	El Paso	97
22	Elbert	2
23	Fremont	23
24	Garfield	20
25	Gilpin	8
26	Grand	26
27	Gunnison	22
28	Hinsdale	12
29	Huerfano	11
30	Jackson	3
31	Jefferson	87
32	Kiowa	6
33	Kit Carson	6
34	La Plata	15
35	Lake	11
36	Larimer	111
37	Las Animas	38
38	Lincoln	3
39	Logan	12
40	Mesa	37
41	Mineral	6
42	Moffat	15
43	Montezuma	41
44	Montrose	30
45	Morgan	16
46	Otero	22
47	Ouray	5
48	Park	29
49	Phillips	10
50	Pitkin	38
51	Prowers	17
52	Pueblo	69
53	Rio Blanco	13
54	Rio Grande	13
55	Routt	27
56	Saguache	10
57	San Juan	12
58	San Miguel	9
59	Sedgwick	3
60	Summit	10
61	Teller	11
62	Washington	4
63	Weld	41
64	Yuma	5
(duplicates)		(15)
Total:		1,664

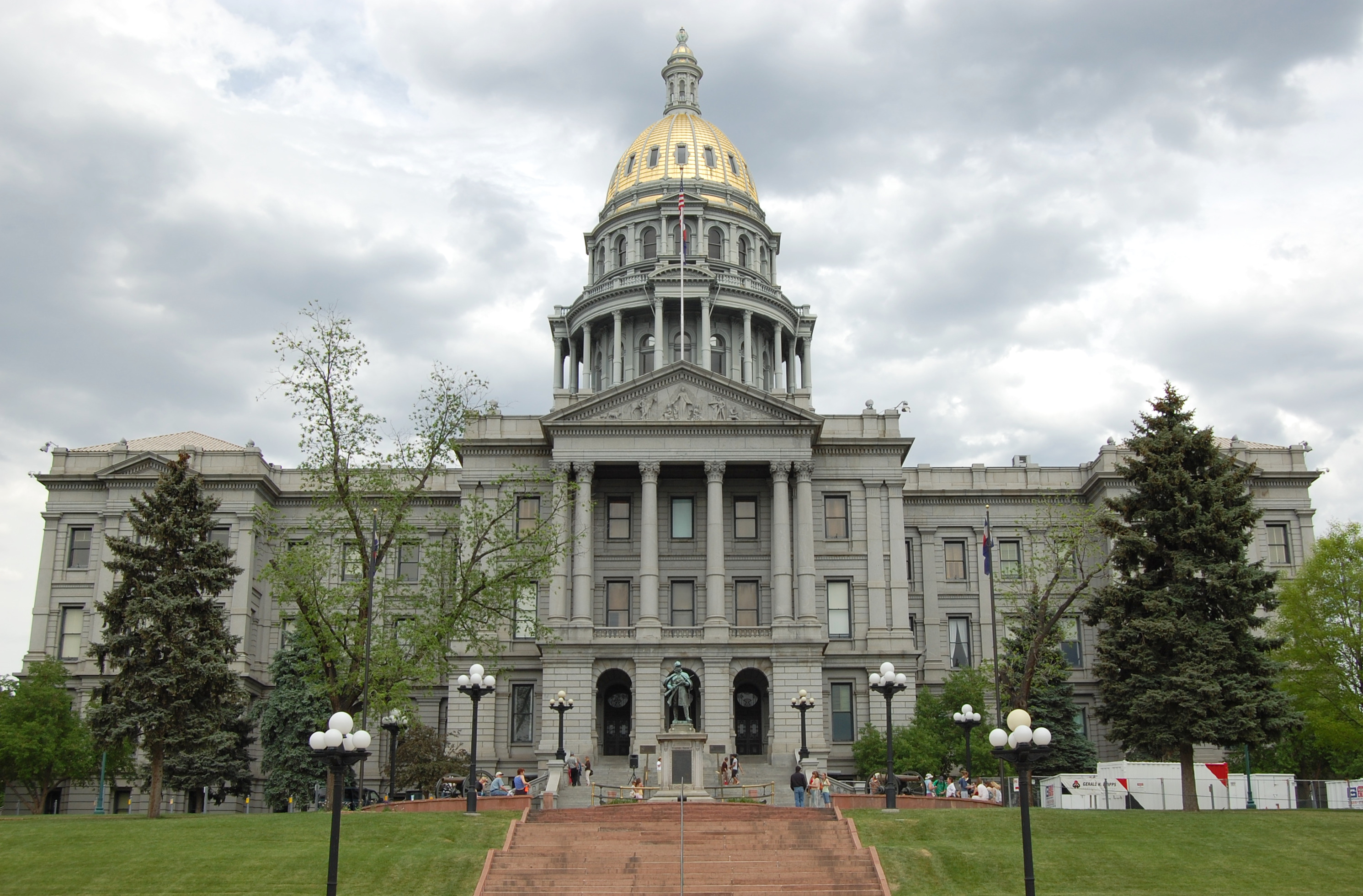
Colorado State Capitol Annex Building and Boiler Plant, Denver

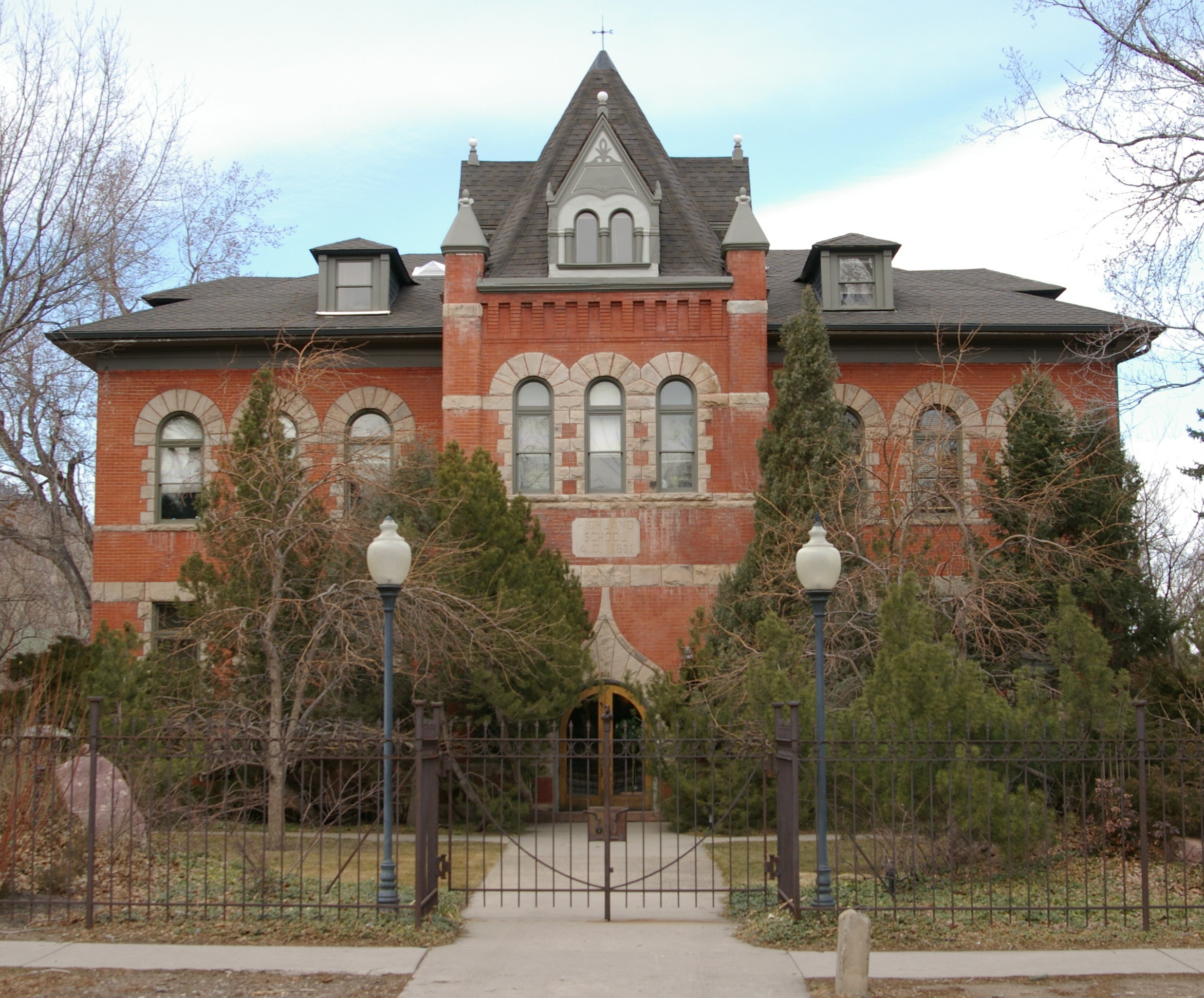
Highland School, Boulder County

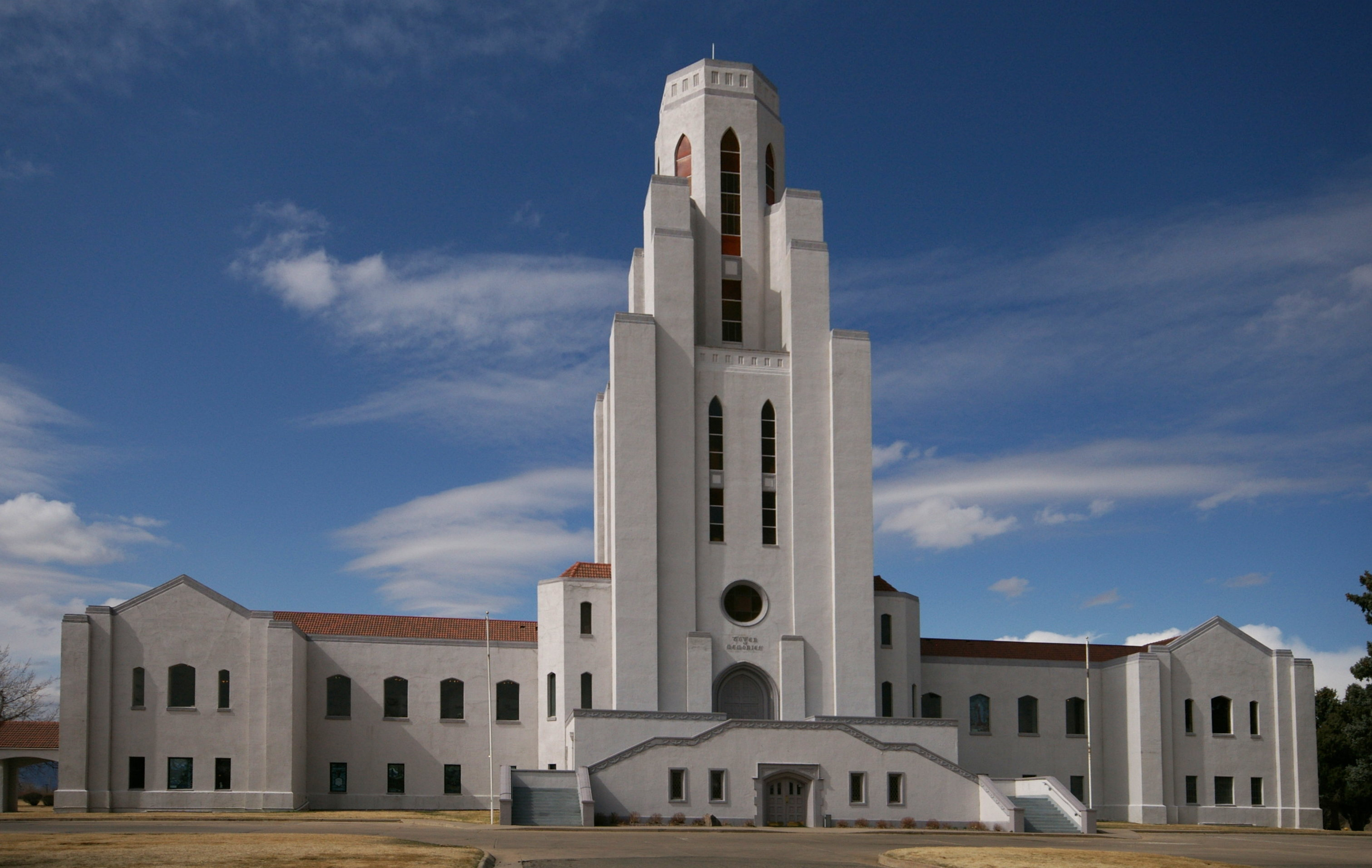
Tower of Memories, Jefferson County

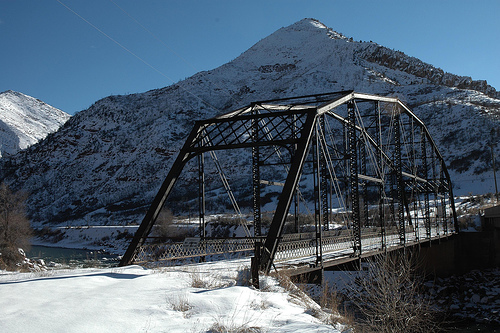
South Canon Bridge, Garfield County

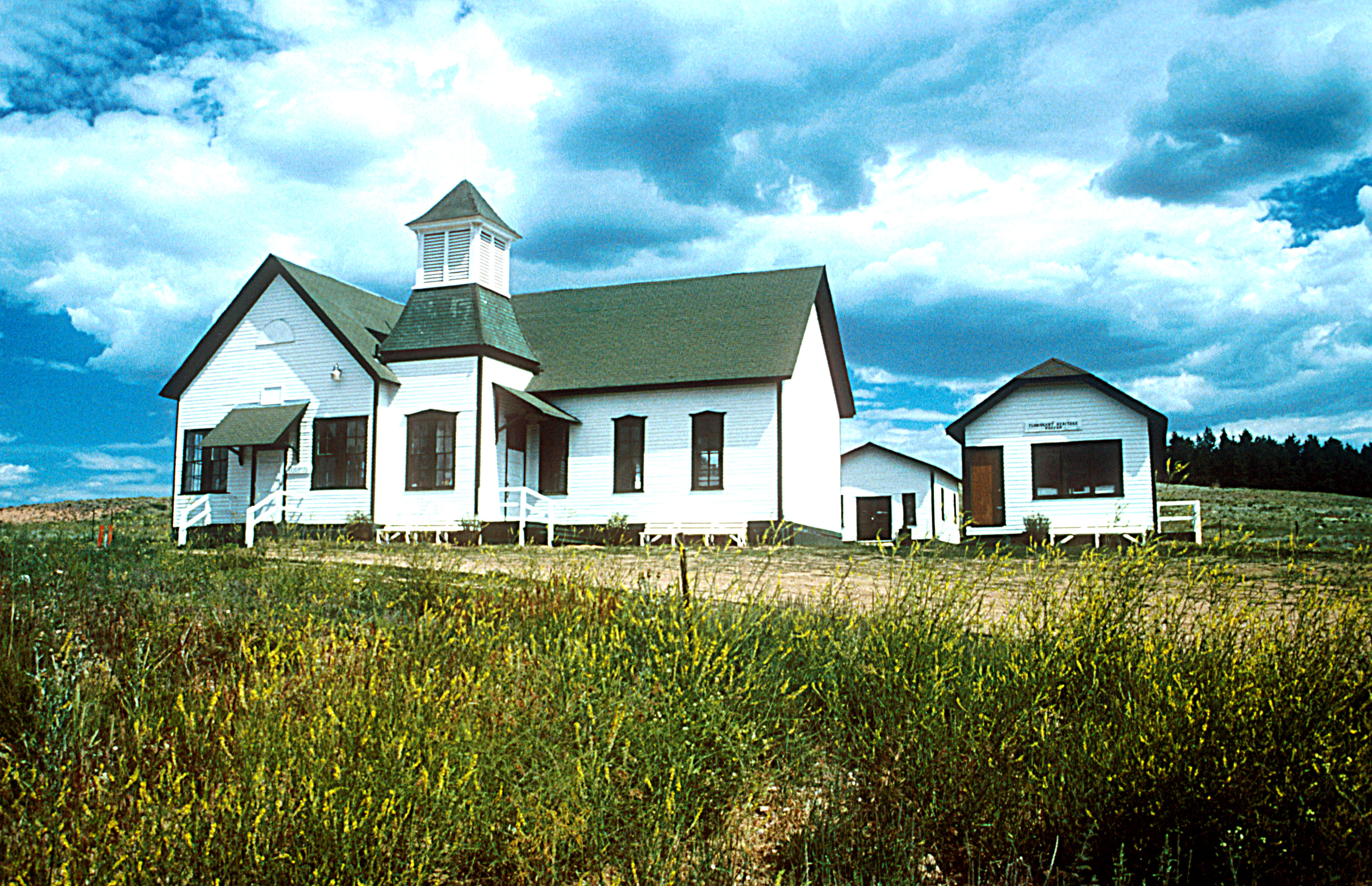
Florissant School, Teller County

== Archuleta County ==
	Name on the Register	Image	Date listed	Location	City or town	Description
1	Chimney Rock Archeological Site	Chimney Rock Archeological Site	August 25, 1970 (#70000153)	Off U.S. Highway 160, southeast of the community of Chimney Rock; 37°11′40″N 107°18′04″W	Chimney Rock	
2	Denver & Rio Grande Railroad San Juan Extension	Denver & Rio Grande Railroad San Juan Extension	February 16, 1973 (#73000462)	Between Antonito and Chama, New Mexico via Cumbres Pass; 36°51′56″N 106°23′56″W	Antonito	Now a scenic railway, the Cumbres and Toltec Scenic Railroad; extends into Conejos County; National Historic Landmark designation October 16, 2012
3	Labo Del Rio Bridge	Labo Del Rio Bridge	June 24, 1985 (#85001399)	County Road F40 over the Piedra River; 37°04′33″N 107°24′17″W	Arboles	

== Baca County ==
	Name on the Register	Image	Date listed	Location	City or town	Description
1	Colorado Millennial Site		April 8, 1980 (#80000877)	At the source of Rule Creek, 2 miles (3.2 km) south of the junction of Baca, Bent, and Las Animas counties 37°37′01″N 103°04′43″W	Ruxton	Extends into Las Animas County
2	Springfield Schoolhouse	Springfield Schoolhouse	October 5, 1977 (#77000363)	281 W. 7th Ave. 37°24′26″N 102°37′08″W	Springfield	
3	Stonington First Methodist-Episcopal Church	Stonington First Methodist-Episcopal Church	March 14, 1996 (#96000272)	48854 County Road X 37°17′40″N 102°11′19″W	Stonington	
4	Two Buttes Gymnasium	Two Buttes Gymnasium	December 22, 2009 (#09001119)	5th and C Sts. 37°33′35″N 102°23′55″W	Two Buttes	

== Bent County ==
	Name on the Register	Image	Date listed	Location	City or town	Description
1	Bent County Courthouse and Jail	Bent County Courthouse and Jail	January 2, 1976 (#76000546)	725 Carson Ave. 38°03′51″N 103°13′12″W	Las Animas	
2	Bent County High School	Bent County High School	July 30, 2010 (#10000505)	1214 Ambassador Thompson Blvd. 38°03′54″N 103°13′56″W	Las Animas	
3	Boggsville	Boggsville	October 24, 1986 (#86002841)	South of Las Animas on State Highway 101; 38°02′39″N 103°12′29″W	Las Animas	Boundary increase approved May 23, 2022.
4	Fort Lyon	Fort Lyon	May 5, 2004 (#04000388)	Junction of County Road 15 and Fort Lyon Gate Rd. 38°04′38″N 103°07′58″W	Las Animas	
5	Fort Lyon National Cemetery	Fort Lyon National Cemetery	January 17, 2017 (#100000472)	15700 County Road HH; 38°05′03″N 103°07′46″W	Las Animas	
6	Las Animas Post Office	Las Animas Post Office	January 16, 2008 (#07001392)	513 6th St. 38°03′58″N 103°13′23″W	Las Animas	
7	Prowers Bridge	Prowers Bridge	February 4, 1985 (#85000189)	County Road 34; 38°05′37″N 102°46′03″W	Prowers	
8	Santa Fe Trail Mountain Route--Bent's New Fort	Santa Fe Trail Mountain Route--Bent's New Fort	September 26, 2016 (#16000666)	Address Restricted	Lamar	

=== Former listing ===
	Name on the Register	Image	Date listed	Date removed	Location	City or town	Description
1	Columbian Elementary School	Columbian Elementary School	July 9, 2004 (#04000665)	July 26, 2006	1026 W. 6th St.	Las Animas	Demolished in 2006

== City and County of Broomfield ==
There are no places in the City and County of Broomfield currently listed on the National Register of Historic Places.

== Cheyenne County ==
	Name on the Register	Image	Date listed	Location	City or town	Description
1	Cheyenne County Courthouse	Cheyenne County Courthouse	July 27, 1989 (#89000997)	51 S. 1st St. 38°49′15″N 102°20′55″W	Cheyenne Wells	
2	Cheyenne County Jail	Cheyenne County Jail	June 16, 1988 (#88000758)	85 W. 2nd St. 38°49′14″N 102°21′03″W	Cheyenne Wells	

== Crowley County ==
	Name on the Register	Image	Date listed	Location	City or town	Description
1	Crowley School	Crowley School	July 28, 1999 (#99000897)	301 Main St. 38°11′41″N 103°51′12″W	Crowley	Now the Crowley County Heritage Center.

=== Former listing ===
	Name on the Register	Image	Date listed	Date removed	Location	City or town	Description
1	Manzanola Bridge	Manzanola Bridge	June 24, 1985 (#85001400)	July 22, 1994	Colorado Highway 207	Manzanola vicinity	Demolished in 1985

== Custer County ==
	Name on the Register	Image	Date listed	Location	City or town	Description
1	Beckwith Ranch	Beckwith Ranch	May 20, 1998 (#98000568)	64159 State Highway 69; 38°11′31″N 105°31′21″W	Westcliffe	
2	Holdsworth House-Aspenholme-Pines Lodge	Holdsworth House-Aspenholme-Pines Lodge	October 15, 2021 (#100006742)	379 Chalice Dr. 38°10′05″N 105°35′13″W	Westcliffe vicinity	
3	Hope Lutheran Church	Hope Lutheran Church	January 31, 1978 (#78000838)	310 S. 3rd St. 38°07′57″N 105°28′02″W	Westcliffe	
4	Kennicott Cabin	Kennicott Cabin	February 14, 1997 (#97000046)	63161 State Highway 69; 38°10′57″N 105°30′35″W	Westcliffe	
5	Mingus Homestead	Mingus Homestead	December 4, 1990 (#90001791)	Off State Highway 165 north of its junction with Ophir Creek Rd. in the San Isabel National Forest; 38°05′55″N 105°06′37″W	Beulah	
6	National Hotel-Wolff Building	National Hotel-Wolff Building	November 5, 1987 (#87001288)	201 2nd St. 38°08′04″N 105°28′05″W	Westcliffe	
7	Westcliff School	Westcliff School	July 27, 1989 (#89000999)	304 4th St. 38°07′57″N 105°27′57″W	Westcliffe	
8	Westcliffe Jail	Westcliffe Jail	February 3, 1993 (#92001846)	116 2nd St. 38°08′12″N 105°28′05″W	Westcliffe	
9	Wetmore Post Office	Wetmore Post Office	September 12, 2008 (#08000860)	682 County Road 395; 38°13′47″N 105°05′24″W	Wetmore	
10	Willows School	Willows School	May 14, 1993 (#93000413)	Willows Ln. (County Road 141) between Muddy Ln. (County Road 155) and Schoolfield Rd. (County Road 328); 38°06′39″N 105°32′15″W	Westcliffe	

== Dolores County ==
	Name on the Register	Image	Date listed	Location	City or town	Description
1	Ansel Hall Ruin	Ansel Hall Ruin	November 25, 1997 (#97001418)	Address Restricted	Cahone	
2	Beaver Creek Massacre Site	Beaver Creek Massacre Site	October 2, 1986 (#86002670)	Address Restricted	Dolores	
3	Dey Building	Dey Building	April 15, 1999 (#99000448)	3 N. Glasgow; 37°41′33″N 108°01′53″W	Rico	
4	William Kauffman House	William Kauffman House	October 29, 1982 (#82001014)	Silver St. 37°41′35″N 108°01′45″W	Rico	
5	Rico City Hall	Rico City Hall	December 31, 1974 (#74000574)	Northeastern corner of Commercial and Mantz Sts. 37°41′33″N 108°01′48″W	Rico	

== Elbert County ==
	Name on the Register	Image	Date listed	Location	City or town	Description
1	First National Bank of Elizabeth	First National Bank of Elizabeth	March 10, 2023 (#100008713)	188 South Main St. 39°21′39″N 104°35′43″W	Elizabeth	
2	St. Mark United Presbyterian Church	St. Mark United Presbyterian Church	September 18, 1980 (#80000899)	225 Main St. 39°13′13″N 104°32′14″W	Elbert	

== Gilpin County ==
	Name on the Register	Image	Date listed	Location	City or town	Description
1	Bain Cabin		April 6, 2018 (#100002289)	501 Shoshoni Camp Rd. 39°55′35″N 105°29′33″W	Rollinsville vicinity	
2	Central City Opera House	Central City Opera House	January 18, 1973 (#73000474)	Eureka St. 39°48′04″N 105°30′47″W	Central City	
3	Central City-Black Hawk Historic District	Central City-Black Hawk Historic District	October 15, 1966 (#66000246)	On State Highway 119; 39°48′04″N 105°30′27″W	Central City	
4	Denver, Northwestern and Pacific Railway Historic District	Denver, Northwestern and Pacific Railway Historic District	September 30, 1980 (#80000881)	Southwest of Eldora; 39°54′52″N 105°41′10″W	East Portal	Historic railroad route over Rollins Pass; extends into Grand and Boulder counties.
5	Frontenac and Aduddell Mine Complex		December 31, 2020 (#100005981)	0.25 mi. southwest of jct. of Church Placer and Pewabic Mountain Rds. 39°46′17″N 105°30′58″W	Russell Gulch vicinity	
6	Russell Gulch I.O.O.F. Hall No. 47–Wagner and Askew	Russell Gulch I.O.O.F. Hall No. 47–Wagner and Askew	December 15, 2011 (#11000903)	81 Russell Gulch Rd. 39°46′48″N 105°32′06″W	Russell Gulch	
7	Teller House	Teller House	January 18, 1973 (#73000475)	Eureka St. 39°48′03″N 105°30′46″W	Central City	
8	Winks Panorama	Winks Panorama	March 28, 1980 (#80000901)	Southwest of Pinecliffe; 39°55′16″N 105°27′25″W	Pinecliffe	Designated a National Historic Landmark in 2023.

== Huerfano County ==
	Name on the Register	Image	Date listed	Location	City or town	Description
1	Francisco Plaza	Francisco Plaza	October 23, 1986 (#86002950)	312 S. Main St. 37°30′27″N 105°00′33″W	La Veta	
2	Huerfano County Courthouse and Jail	Huerfano County Courthouse and Jail	April 23, 1973 (#73000476)	400 Main St. 37°37′29″N 104°46′53″W	Walsenburg	
3	Huerfano County High School	Huerfano County High School	November 2, 2005 (#05001200)	415 Walsen Ave. 37°37′51″N 104°47′10″W	Walsenburg	
4	La Veta Pass Narrow Gauge Railroad Depot	La Veta Pass Narrow Gauge Railroad Depot	June 6, 1980 (#80000902)	Off U.S. Highway 160; 37°35′35″N 105°12′12″W	La Veta	
5	Lamme Hospital	Lamme Hospital	December 10, 1993 (#93001376)	314 S. Main St. 37°30′26″N 105°00′31″W	La Veta	
6	Maitland Arroyo Bridge	Maitland Arroyo Bridge	October 15, 2002 (#02001134)	State Highway 69 at Milepost 3.0; 37°39′57″N 104°50′00″W	Walsenburg	
7	Montoya Ranch	Montoya Ranch	July 3, 2012 (#12000377)	19176 State Highway 69; 37°44′41″N 105°04′17″W	Farisita	
8	Oxford Hotel	Oxford Hotel	November 4, 2024 (#100011000)	118 W. 6th Street; 37°37′25″N 104°46′54″W	Walsenburg	
9	Edwin L. Smith Building	Edwin L. Smith Building	August 17, 2020 (#100005435)	300 South Main St. 37°30′28″N 105°00′33″W	La Veta	
10	Veta Pass	Veta Pass	August 31, 2011 (#11000607)	3652, 3665, 3688 County Road 443; 37°35′35″N 105°12′12″W	La Veta	
11	Walsenburg Mercantile	Walsenburg Mercantile	March 10, 2025 (#100011507)	408 Russell Avenue; 37°37′33″N 104°46′48″W	Walsenburg	

== Jackson County ==
	Name on the Register	Image	Date listed	Location	City or town	Description
1	Colorado State Forest Building Complex	Colorado State Forest Building Complex	January 17, 2017 (#100000474)	Near State Highway 14; 40°30′05″N 105°57′56″W	Gould	
2	Hog Park Guard Station		September 25, 2003 (#03000960)	Routt National Forest; 40°59′56″N 106°48′52″W	Cowdrey	Log cabin built in 1910-12
3	Lake Agnes Cabin	Lake Agnes Cabin	September 26, 2007 (#07000998)	2.5 miles from State Highway 14 near Cameron Pass; 40°29′24″N 105°54′08″W	Gould	

== Kiowa County ==
	Name on the Register	Image	Date listed	Location	City or town	Description
1	American Legion Hall	American Legion Hall	December 11, 2007 (#07001248)	U.S. Highway 287 north of Eads; 38°29′06″N 102°47′17″W	Eads	
2	Crow–Hightower House	Crow–Hightower House	August 20, 2013 (#13000605)	909 Maine St. 38°29′00″N 102°46′53″W	Eads	
3	Eads Community Church	Eads Community Church	August 20, 2013 (#13000606)	110 E. 11th St. 38°28′56″N 102°46′51″W	Eads	
4	Eads School Gymnasium	Eads School Gymnasium	August 20, 2013 (#13000607)	W. 10th and Slater Sts. 38°28′59″N 102°46′58″W	Eads	
5	Hotel Holly–Haswell Hotel	Hotel Holly–Haswell Hotel	August 20, 2013 (#13000608)	200 4th St. 38°27′11″N 103°09′48″W	Haswell	Historic district containing a two-story hotel, filling station, bunkhouse, chicken coop, and non-contributing garage.
6	Sand Creek Massacre Site	Sand Creek Massacre Site	September 28, 2001 (#01001055)	Near the junction of County Roads 54 and W 38°34′13″N 102°30′11″W	Eads	Boundary increase approved, September 19, 2016

== Kit Carson County ==
	Name on the Register	Image	Date listed	Location	City or town	Description
1	Burlington Gymnasium	Burlington Gymnasium	December 11, 2007 (#07001249)	450 11th St. 39°18′17″N 102°15′46″W	Burlington	
2	Burlington State Armory	Burlington State Armory	September 20, 1984 (#84000859)	191 14th St. 39°18′08″N 102°16′05″W	Burlington	
3	Elitch Gardens Carousel	Elitch Gardens Carousel	December 19, 1978 (#78000861)	Kit Carson County Fairgrounds; 39°18′32″N 102°16′13″W	Burlington vicinity	
4	Flagler Hospital	Flagler Hospital	January 30, 1991 (#90001421)	311 Main Ave., P.O. Box 126; 39°17′36″N 103°04′45″W	Flagler	
5	Sim Hudson Motor Company Building	Sim Hudson Motor Company Building	November 7, 2007 (#07001149)	1332 Senter Ave. 39°18′17″N 102°16′00″W	Burlington	
6	Spring Creek Bridge	Spring Creek Bridge	October 15, 2002 (#02001143)	U.S. Highway 24 at milepost 430.32; 39°18′01″N 102°43′41″W	Vona	

=== Former listing ===
	Name on the Register	Image	Date listed	Date removed	Location	City or town	Description
1	Winegar Building		May 22, 1986 (#86001123)	November 9, 2015	494-498 14th St. 39°18′21″N 102°16′03″W	Burlington	Apparently demolished in or before 2013

== Lincoln County ==
	Name on the Register	Image	Date listed	Location	City or town	Description
1	Limon Railroad Depot	Limon Railroad Depot	February 20, 2003 (#03000038)	897 1st St. 39°15′37″N 103°41′14″W	Limon	
2	Hugo Municipal Pool	Hugo Municipal Pool	July 24, 2008 (#08000692)	Junction of US 287 and 6th Ave. 39°08′00″N 103°27′57″W	Hugo	part of the New Deal Resources on Colorado's Eastern Plains Multiple Property Submission
3	Rock Island Snow Plow No. 95580	Rock Island Snow Plow No. 95580	July 23, 2018 (#100002680)	899 1st St. 39°15′39″N 103°41′12″W	Limon	

== Mineral County ==
	Name on the Register	Image	Date listed	Location	City or town	Description
1	Bachelor-Commodore Mine Complex		July 29, 2021 (#100006753)	Cty. Rd. 503; 37°52′15″N 106°55′45″W	Creede vicinity	
2	Sevenmile Bridge	Sevenmile Bridge	July 11, 1985 (#85001552)	County road 6 miles southwest of Creede; 37°47′33″N 106°58′51″W	Creede	
3	Wagon Wheel Gap Fluorspar Mine and Mill	Wagon Wheel Gap Fluorspar Mine and Mill	April 22, 2019 (#100003643)	1 Goose Creek Rd. 37°44′54″N 106°49′54″W	Creede vicinity	
4	Wagon Wheel Gap Hot Springs Resort		September 26, 2019 (#100004210)	1 Goose Creek Rd. 37°44′57″N 106°49′56″W	Creede vicinity	Now the 4UR Ranch.
5	Wagon Wheel Gap Railroad Station	Wagon Wheel Gap Railroad Station	September 27, 1976 (#76000563)	Southeast of Creede at Wagon Wheel Gap off State Highway 149; 37°45′54″N 106°49′32″W	Creede	
6	Zang's Hotel and Annex	Zang's Hotel and Annex	November 25, 2022 (#100008397)	120 North Main St. 37°51′13″N 106°55′37″W	Creede	

== Ouray County ==
	Name on the Register	Image	Date listed	Location	City or town	Description
1	The Bank Building		September 30, 2026 (#100012931)	523 W. Clinton St. 38°09′09″N 107°45′24″W	Ridgway	
2	Beaumont Hotel	Beaumont Hotel	October 30, 1973 (#73000483)	505 Main St. 38°01′19″N 107°40′17″W	Ouray	
3	George Jackson House	George Jackson House	January 11, 1996 (#95001508)	129 Citadel Dr., off U.S. Highway 550; 38°05′13″N 107°42′12″W	Ridgway vicinity	Historic farmhouse visible from highway between Ridgway and Ouray, about midway
4	Ouray City Hall and Walsh Library	Ouray City Hall and Walsh Library	April 16, 1975 (#75000528)	6th Ave. between 3rd and 4th Sts. 38°01′23″N 107°40′12″W	Ouray	
5	Ouray Historic District	Ouray Historic District	October 6, 1983 (#83003537)	U.S. Highway 550; 38°01′22″N 107°40′24″W	Ouray	

== Phillips County ==
	Name on the Register	Image	Date listed	Location	City or town	Description
1	Evergreen Corner Rural Historic District		December 24, 2013 (#13000960)	Junction of County Roads 17 and 30; 40°38′37″N 102°30′43″W	Haxtun	
2	First National Bank of Haxtun	First National Bank of Haxtun	July 1, 1986 (#86001454)	145 S. Colorado Ave. 40°38′30″N 102°37′42″W	Haxtun	
3	Hargreaves Homestead Rural Historic District		December 3, 2013 (#13000873)	U.S. Route 385 between County Roads 10 and 12; 40°30′19″N 102°17′53″W	Holyoke	
4	Harms Farm		February 2, 2016 (#15001010)	County Road 21 between County Roads 30 and 32; 40°38′51″N 102°28′29″W	Haxtun	
5	W.E. Heginbotham House	W.E. Heginbotham House	March 8, 1988 (#88000170)	539 S. Baxter; 40°34′50″N 102°18′10″W	Holyoke	Now called the Heginbotham Library and serves as Holyoke's public library.
6	Millage Farm Rural Historic District	Millage Farm Rural Historic District	December 3, 2013 (#13000874)	County Road 18 between U.S. Route 385 and County Road 37; 40°33′20″N 102°18′23″W	Holyoke	
7	Oltjenbruns Farm		February 2, 2016 (#15001011)	County Road 49 between Colorado Highway 23 and County Road 34; 40°39′46″N 102°12′14″W	Amherst	
8	Phillips County Courthouse	Phillips County Courthouse	December 28, 2007 (#07001306)	221 Interocean Ave. 40°35′02″N 102°18′04″W	Holyoke	
9	Reimer-Smith Oil Station		April 21, 2000 (#00000323)	109 S. Campbell Ave. 40°35′06″N 102°18′02″W	Holyoke	
10	Shirley Hotel	Shirley Hotel	March 28, 2002 (#02000263)	101 S. Colorado Ave. 40°38′32″N 102°37′42″W	Haxtun	

== San Miguel County ==
	Name on the Register	Image	Date listed	Location	City or town	Description
1	Bachelor Mine		September 8, 2023 (#100009310)	Cty. Rd. Z13 southwest of Naturita; 38°08′59″N 108°50′33″W	Naturita vicinity	
2	Burro Mine Complex		April 28, 2025 (#100011728)	Northern slope of Burro Canyon in rural western San Miguel County. Located off of San Miguel County Road 10S, north of the abandoned town of Slick Rock; 38°02′39″N 108°53′19″W	Egnar vicinity	
3	Fort Peabody	Fort Peabody	March 30, 2005 (#05000214)	Uncompahgre National Forest; 37°55′49″N 107°43′57″W	Telluride	
4	Lewis Mill	Lewis Mill	May 6, 2009 (#09000267)	3.5 miles southeast of Telluride at the head of Bridal Veil Basin; 37°52′44″N 107°46′30″W	Telluride	
5	Rio Grande Southern Railroad Trout Lake Water Tank	Rio Grande Southern Railroad Trout Lake Water Tank	August 21, 2003 (#03000777)	Along North Trout Lake Rd. 37°49′23″N 107°52′45″W	Ophir	
6	Ruble-Orendorf Mercantile	Ruble-Orendorf Mercantile	November 27, 2023 (#100009563)	1635 Grand Ave; 38°07′51″N 108°17′21″W	Norwood	
7	Smuggler-Union Hydroelectric Power Plant	Smuggler-Union Hydroelectric Power Plant	December 27, 1979 (#79000621)	Southeast of Telluride at Bridal Veil Falls; 37°55′09″N 107°46′08″W	Telluride	
8	Telluride Historic District	Telluride Historic District	October 15, 1966 (#66000256)	State Highway 145; 37°56′14″N 107°48′29″W	Telluride	
9	Valley View Leasing and Mining Company Mill	Valley View Leasing and Mining Company Mill	February 24, 2010 (#10000035)	Off State Highway 145, 2.8 miles south of Ophir; 37°50′57″N 107°53′05″W	Ophir	Mining flotation mill building constructed in 1920.

== Sedgwick County ==
	Name on the Register	Image	Date listed	Location	City or town	Description
1	Gibello's Caves		June 16, 2025 (#100011624)	20000 Co Rd 28; 40°57′33″N 102°15′49″W	Julesburg vicinity	
2	Sedgwick County Courthouse	Sedgwick County Courthouse	April 24, 2007 (#07000345)	315 Cedar St. 40°59′18″N 102°15′52″W	Julesburg	
3	Union Pacific Railroad Julesburg Depot	Union Pacific Railroad Julesburg Depot	February 11, 2004 (#04000019)	210 W. 1st St. 40°59′08″N 102°15′48″W	Julesburg	

== Washington County ==
	Name on the Register	Image	Date listed	Location	City or town	Description
1	Akron Gymnasium	Akron Gymnasium	January 16, 2008 (#07001397)	W. 4th St. and Custer Ave. 40°09′43″N 103°13′02″W	Akron	
2	Farmers State Bank of Cope	Farmers State Bank of Cope	May 8, 2017 (#100000952)	45450 Washington Ave. 39°39′49″N 102°51′04″W	Cope	
3	Plum Bush Creek Bridge	Plum Bush Creek Bridge	October 15, 2002 (#02001135)	U.S. Highway 36 at milepost 138.16; 39°44′24″N 103°32′46″W	Last Chance	
4	West Plum Bush Creek Bridge	West Plum Bush Creek Bridge	October 15, 2002 (#02001136)	U.S. Highway 36 at milepost 134.59; 39°44′24″N 103°36′43″W	Last Chance	

== Yuma County ==
	Name on the Register	Image	Date listed	Location	City or town	Description
1	Beecher Island Battleground	Beecher Island Battleground	October 29, 1976 (#76000569)	16.5 miles southeast of Wray on Beecher Rd. 39°52′13″N 102°11′13″W	Wray	
2	Boggs Lumber and Hardware Building	Boggs Lumber and Hardware Building	January 18, 1985 (#85000086)	125 N. Main St. 40°06′48″N 102°29′18″W	Eckley	
3	Cliff Theater	Cliff Theater	August 6, 2013 (#13000577)	420 Main St. 40°04′39″N 102°13′19″W	Wray	
4	Lett Hotel	Lett Hotel	January 25, 1990 (#89002378)	204 S. Ash; 40°07′27″N 102°43′30″W	Yuma	
5	Walter and Anna Zion Homestead		July 6, 2005 (#05000652)	Off County Road 15; 39°46′59″N 102°23′15″W	Idalia	

== See also ==
- Bibliography of Colorado
- Geography of Colorado
- List of historical societies in Colorado
- History of Colorado
- Index of Colorado-related articles
- List of Colorado-related lists
- Outline of Colorado
