= Kauffman House =

Kauffman House may refer to:

- Kauffman House (Grand Lake, Colorado), listed on the National Register of Historic Places (NRHP)
- William Kauffman House, in Rico, Colorado, listed on the NRHP in Colorado
- Linus B. Kauffman House, in Columbus, Ohio, listed on the NRHP in Columbus, Ohio

== See also ==
- Kaufman House (disambiguation)
