= National Register of Historic Places listings in Summit County, Colorado =

Location of Summit County in Colorado

This is a list of the National Register of Historic Places listings in Summit County, Colorado.

This is intended to be a complete list of the properties and districts on the National Register of Historic Places in Summit County, Colorado, United States. The locations of National Register properties and districts for which the latitude and longitude coordinates are included below, may be seen in a map.

There are 10 properties and districts listed on the National Register in the county.

This National Park Service list is complete through NPS recent listings posted August 28, 2026.

== Current listings ==
	Name on the Register	Image	Date listed	Location	City or town	Description
1	Boreas Railroad Station Site	Boreas Railroad Station Site	October 28, 1993 (#93001108)	Boreas Pass Rd. northwest of Como in the Pike National Forest; 39°24′40″N 105°58′05″W	Como	
2	Breckenridge Historic District	Breckenridge Historic District	April 9, 1980 (#80000927)	Roughly bounded by Jefferson Ave., Wellington Rd., and High and Main Sts. 39°28′55″N 106°02′38″W	Breckenridge	
3	The Bunk House Lodge		June 5, 2025 (#100011589)	13203 CO-9; 39°31′33″N 106°02′46″W	Breckenridge	
4	Frisco Schoolhouse	Frisco Schoolhouse	September 15, 1983 (#83001333)	120 Main St. 39°34′30″N 106°06′00″W	Frisco	
5	Masonic Placer Cemetery-Valley Brook Cemetery	Masonic Placer Cemetery-Valley Brook Cemetery	July 18, 2014 (#14000422)	905 Airport Rd. 39°29′52″N 106°03′03″W	Breckenridge	
6	Montezuma Schoolhouse	Montezuma Schoolhouse	January 9, 2007 (#06001239)	5375 Webster St. 39°34′54″N 105°51′59″W	Montezuma	
7	Porcupine Peak Site		August 1, 1980 (#80000928)	Address Restricted	Dillon	
8	Slate Creek Bridge	Slate Creek Bridge	June 24, 1985 (#85001402)	County Road 1450 over the Blue River; 39°47′00″N 106°09′43″W	Slate Creek	
9	Soda Creek Ranch		March 1, 2010 (#10000036)	Off Keystone Ranch Rd. and County Road 351; 39°33′39″N 105°59′36″W	Keystone	
10	Wildhack's Grocery Store-Post Office	Wildhack's Grocery Store-Post Office	May 16, 1985 (#85001059)	510 Main St. 39°34′34″N 106°05′46″W	Frisco	

== See also ==
- List of National Historic Landmarks in Colorado
- List of National Register of Historic Places in Colorado
- Bibliography of Colorado
- Geography of Colorado
- History of Colorado
- Index of Colorado-related articles
- List of Colorado-related lists
- Outline of Colorado
