= Millage (disambiguation) =

Millage may refer to:

- Millage tax
- Curtis Millage (born 1980), American basketball player
- David Millage (1953–2026), American politician
- Nichole Millage (born 1977), American Paralympic volleyball player
- Millage Farm Rural Historic District, Colorado
