= First National Bank of Haxtun =

- U.S. National Register of Historic Places
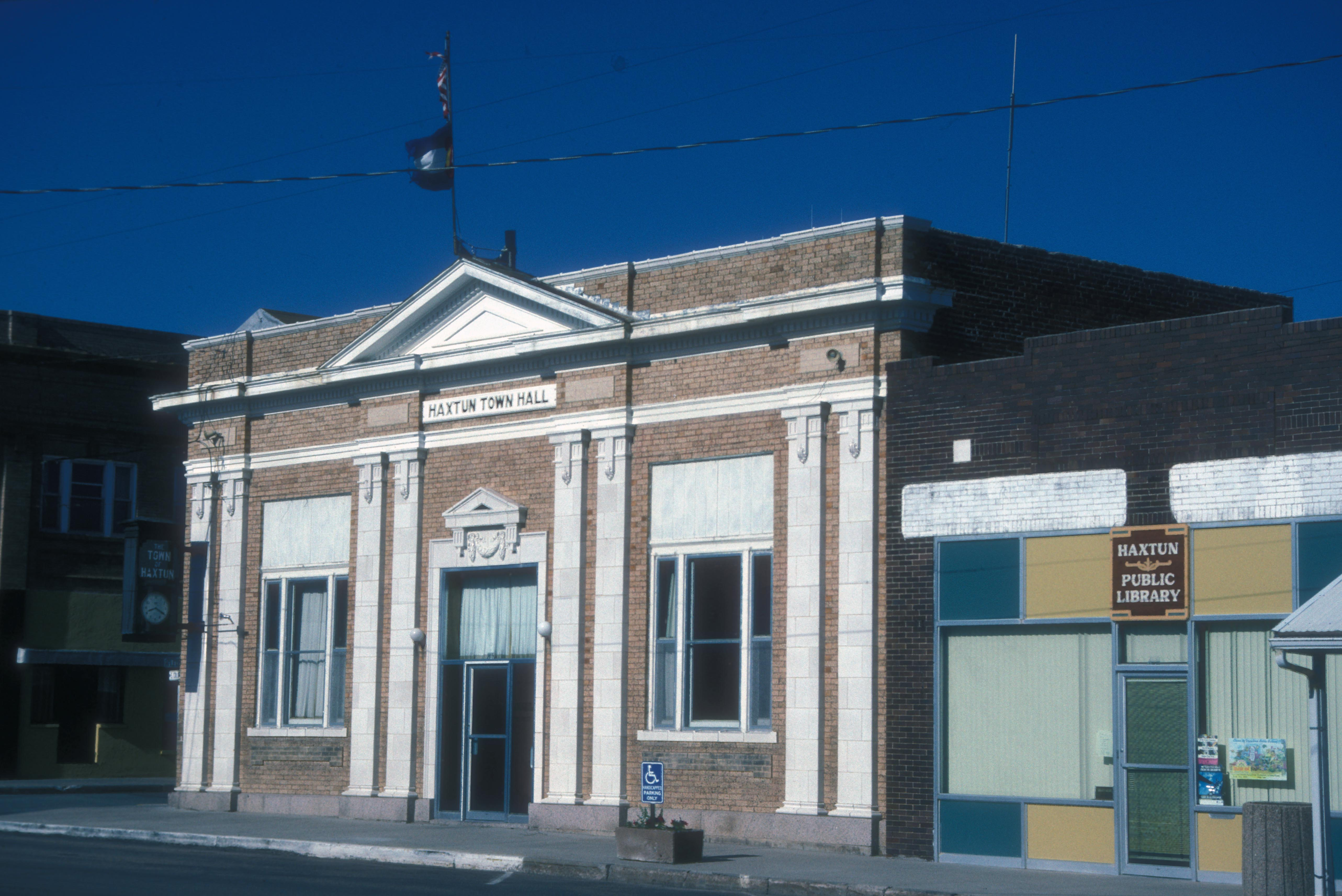

- Location within Colorado Location within the United States
- Location: 145 S. Colorado Ave., Haxtun, Colorado
- Coordinates: 40°38′30″N 102°37′42″W
- Area: 0.3 acres (0.12 ha)
- Built: 1917
- Architectural style: Colonial Revival, Georgian Revival
- NRHP reference No.: 86001454
- Added to NRHP: July 1, 1986

The First National Bank of Haxtun building, at 145 S. Colorado Ave. in Haxtun, Colorado was built in 1917. It is designed in Georgian Revival style. It served as a bank until closing, during the Great Depression, in 1932. It was bought by the town in 1939 for use as the Haxtun Town Hall, and was so used at least until the time of National Register of Historic Places (NRHP) listing in 1986.

According to its NRHP nomination, the building "is the most significant historic property in terms of physical integrity and architectural styling" in Haxtun.
