= Harms Farm =

- U.S. National Register of Historic Places
- U.S. Historic district
- Location within Colorado Location within the United States
- Location: County Road 21 between County Roads 30 and 32, Haxtun, Colorado
- Coordinates: 40°38′51″N 102°28′29″W
- Area: 160 acres (0.65 km^{2})
- NRHP reference No.: 15001010
- Added to NRHP: February 2, 2016

The Harms Farm in Phillips County, Colorado near Haxtun, Colorado, also known as Gansemer Farm, is a 160 acres (0.65 km^{2}) farm which was listed on the National Register of Historic Places in 2016.

It is located about 2.5 miles (4.0 km) north of Paoli, Colorado.

The farmland was claimed by John A. Nelson under the Timber Culture Act in 1894. It was purchased by William Gansemer in 1917 and it has been in continuous operation since. William eventually sold to his brother Fred. In 2015 it was operated by Duane Harms, Fred Gansemer's great-grandson.
