= Huerfano County Courthouse and Jail =

- U.S. National Register of Historic Places
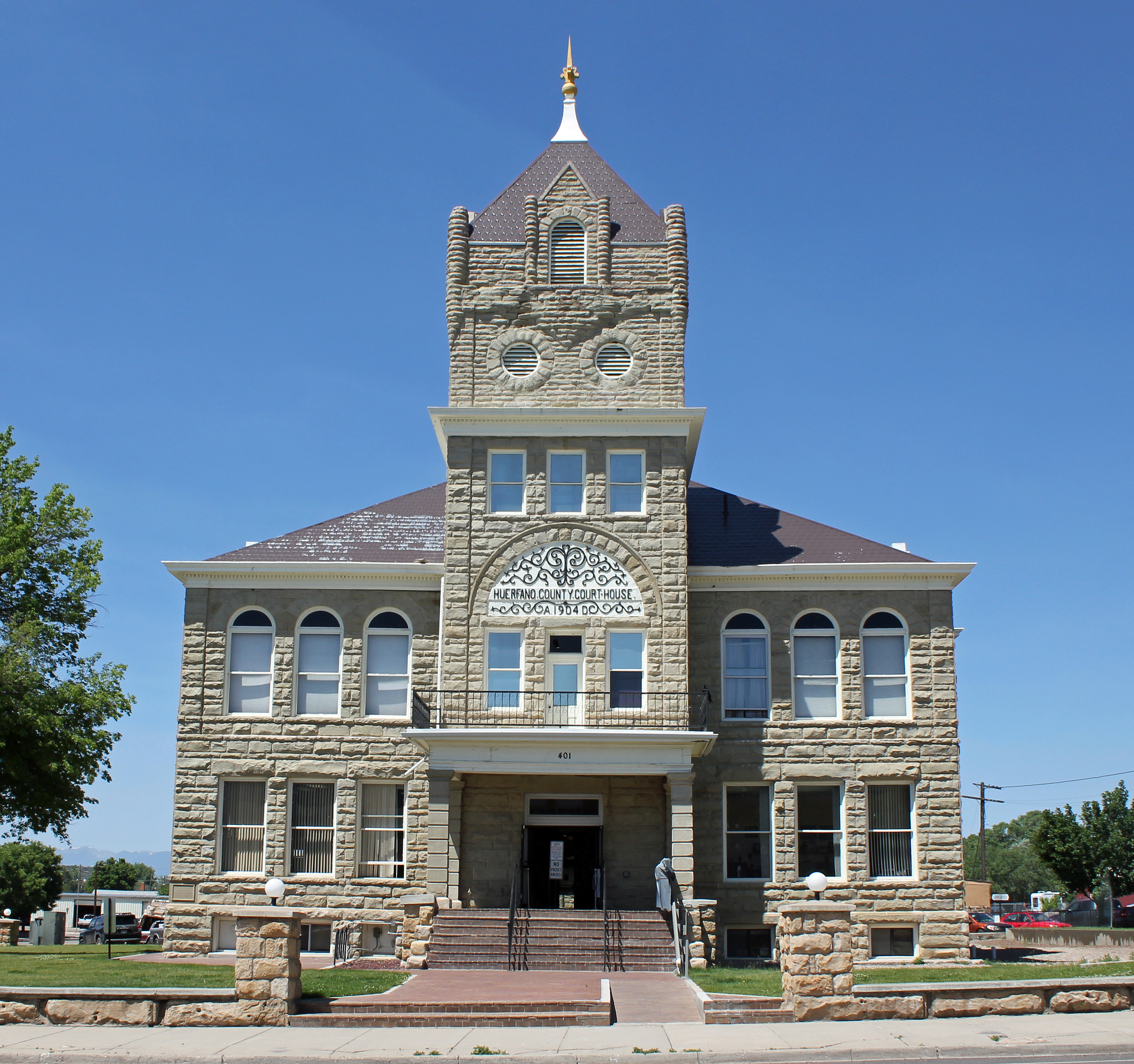

- Location within Colorado Location within the United States
- Interactive map showing the location of Huerfano County Courthouse
- Location: 400 Main St., Walsenburg, Colorado
- Coordinates: 37°37′29″N 104°46′53″W
- Area: 1.9 acres (0.77 ha)
- Built: 1904
- Architect: Henderson, C. A.
- Architectural style: Romanesque
- NRHP reference No.: 73000476
- Added to NRHP: April 23, 1973

The Huerfano County Courthouse and Old Walsenburg Jail now the Walsenburg Mining Museum, are historic buildings in Walsenburg, Colorado in Huerfano County. The courthouse was built in 1904. The jail was built in 1896. The buildings were added to the National Register of Historic Places on April 23, 1973. The courthouse is located at 400 Main Street. The jail is located at 112 West Fifth Street. The jail held Bob Ford, who killed Jesse James, and labor leader Mary "Mother" Jones.

== See also ==
- National Register of Historic Places listings in Colorado
