= Shirley Hotel =

- U.S. National Register of Historic Places
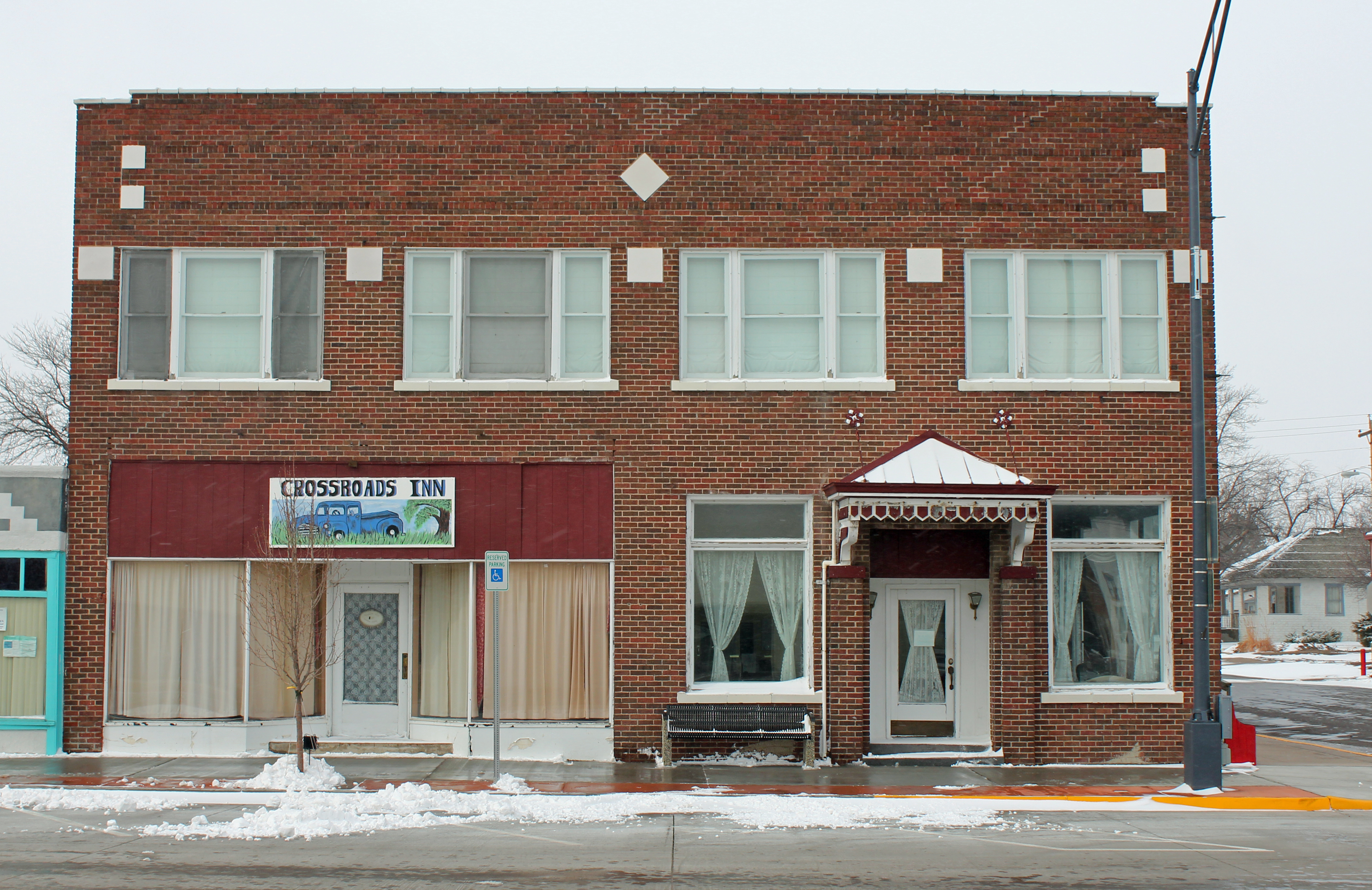
- Photo in February, 2013

- Location within Colorado Location within the United States
- Location: 101 S. Colorado Ave., Haxtun, Colorado
- Coordinates: 40°38′32″N 102°37′42″W
- Area: less than one acre
- Built: 1921
- Architectural style: Early Commercial
- NRHP reference No.: 02000263
- Added to NRHP: March 28, 2002

The Shirley Hotel, located at 101 S. Colorado Ave. in Haxtun, Colorado is a historic building that is listed on the National Register of Historic Places. It is a two-story brick building with terra cotta details and Early Commercial style. Built in 1921, it has also been known as Hotel Shirley, as Johnson Meat Company, as Haxtun Inn.

It operated as a hotel from 1921 to 1971, longer than any other hotel in Haxtun. It was deemed significant for association with the commercial history of Haxtun. It was deemed important architecturally, also, as "good intact example of an early 1920s commercial building built to accommodate a small town hotel and various related commercial enterprises."

It was listed on the National Register of Historic Places in 2002.
