= Oltjenbruns Farm =

- U.S. National Register of Historic Places
- U.S. Historic district
- Colorado State Register of Historic Properties No. 5PL.163
- Location within Colorado Location within the United States
- Location: County Road 49 between Colorado Highway 23 and County Road 34, near Holyoke, Colorado
- Coordinates: 40°39′46″N 102°12′14″W
- Area: 320 acres (1.3 km^{2})
- NRHP reference No.: 15001011
- CSRHP No.: 5PL.163

Significant dates
- Added to NRHP: February 2, 2016
- Designated CSRHP: 2016

The Oltjenbruns Farm in Phillips County, Colorado near Amherst, Colorado, also known as Welper Farm, is a 160 acres (0.65 km^{2}) farm which was listed on the National Register of Historic Places in 2016.

The district includes nine contributing buildings, three contributing structures, one contributing site, and one contributing object, as well as two non-contributing buildings. The two-story farm house was built in 1915 and is 33 by 35 feet (10 m × 11 m) in plan. It was built by Robert Buchholz and is in a simplified Dutch Colonial Revival style. August Welper, a farmer from Nebraska, raised chickens, cows, and horses and grew alfalfa and wheat. From the dairy, he sold milk, cream, and butter.
