= Evergreen Corner Rural Historic District =

Historic district in Colorado, United States

- U.S. National Register of Historic Places
- U.S. Historic district
- Location within Colorado Location within the United States
- Location: Junction of County Roads 17 and 30, Haxtun, Colorado
- Coordinates: 40.643551°N 102.512067°W
- Area: 160 acres (0.65 km^{2})
- NRHP reference No.: 13000960
- Added to NRHP: December 12, 2013

The Evergreen Corner Rural Historic District in Haxtun, Colorado, is a 160-acre (0.65 km^{2}) farm property, a historic district that was listed on the National Register of Historic Places in 2013.

== History ==
Swedish immigrant Gustav Lindholm homesteaded the property in March 1887 but died in July 1887. Henry A. Flaker, of Nebraska, bought the land in 1917 and built a barn, a house, and a tankhouse, and planted evergreens to shelter it, naming it Evergreen Corner. Flaker's farm produced winter wheat and hogs. Lawrence Heermann bought the farm in 1946 and farmed wheat and beef cattle.

According to the NRHP nomination, the district "is an excellent example of a Phillips County farmstead; a working landscape that illustrates the development of agriculture from the 1910s through the 1960s."

As of 2013, the district included four contributing buildings, 11 contributing structures, one contributing site, and two contributing objects, as well as eight non-contributing resources.
