= Eads School Gymnasium =

Historic gymnasium in Colorado, United States

- U.S. National Register of Historic Places
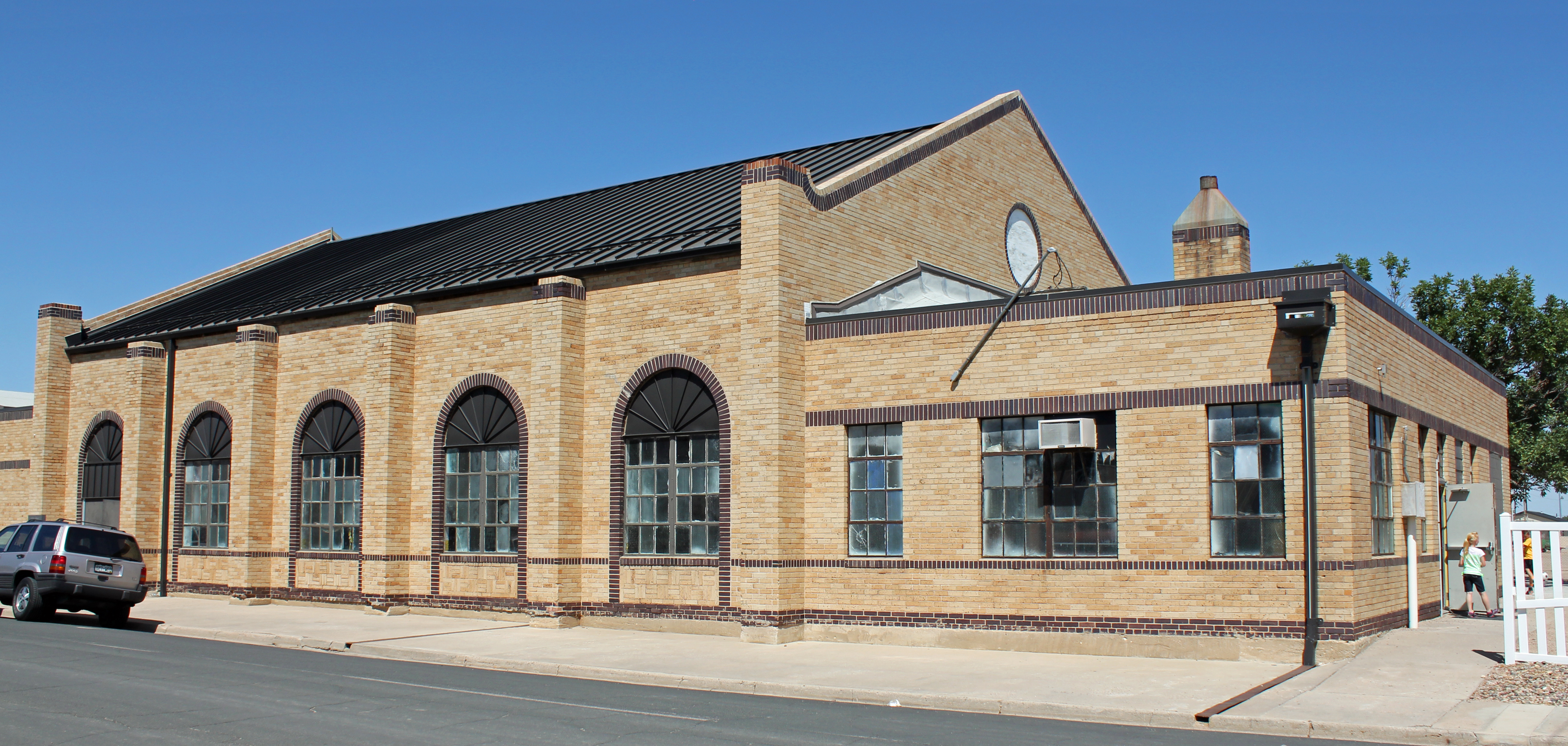
- The gym in 2013.

- Location within Colorado Location within the United States
- Location: W. 10th and Slater Sts. (northeast corner), Eads, Colorado
- Coordinates: 38°28′59″N 102°46′58″W
- Built: 1929
- Architectural style: Mission Revival
- NRHP reference No.: 13000607
- Added to NRHP: August 20, 2013

The Eads School Gymnasium is a historic Mission Revival-style school gymnasium in Eads, Colorado. It was built in 1929 and listed on the National Register of Historic Places in 2013.

The gymnasium was important in Eads for providing an alternative to the basement of the 1923-built Eads Community Church (also NRHP-listed) for indoor basketball and other community events. The construction of this building reflected the increasingly common opinion of the time that a complete education included physical education. It is credited with providing advantages that contributed to the success of the basketball team during the 1930s and 1940s. It also supported women's basketball and other sports.
