= Kaufman House =

Kaufman House may refer to:

- Kaufmann Desert House, Palm Springs, California, designed by Richard Neutra
- Frank J. Kaufman House in Columbus, Ohio, listed on the NRHP in Columbus, Ohio
- H. L. Kaufman House, in Enid, Oklahoma, listed on the NRHP in Garfield County, Oklahoma
- E. C. Kaufman House, in Victoria, Texas, listed on the NRHP in Victoria County, Texas
- Fallingwater, Mill Run, Pennsylvania, also known as the Edgar J. Kaufmann Sr. Residence, designed by Frank Lloyd Wright
