= National Hotel (Westcliffe, Colorado) =

- National Hotel (Wolff Building)
- U.S. National Register of Historic Places
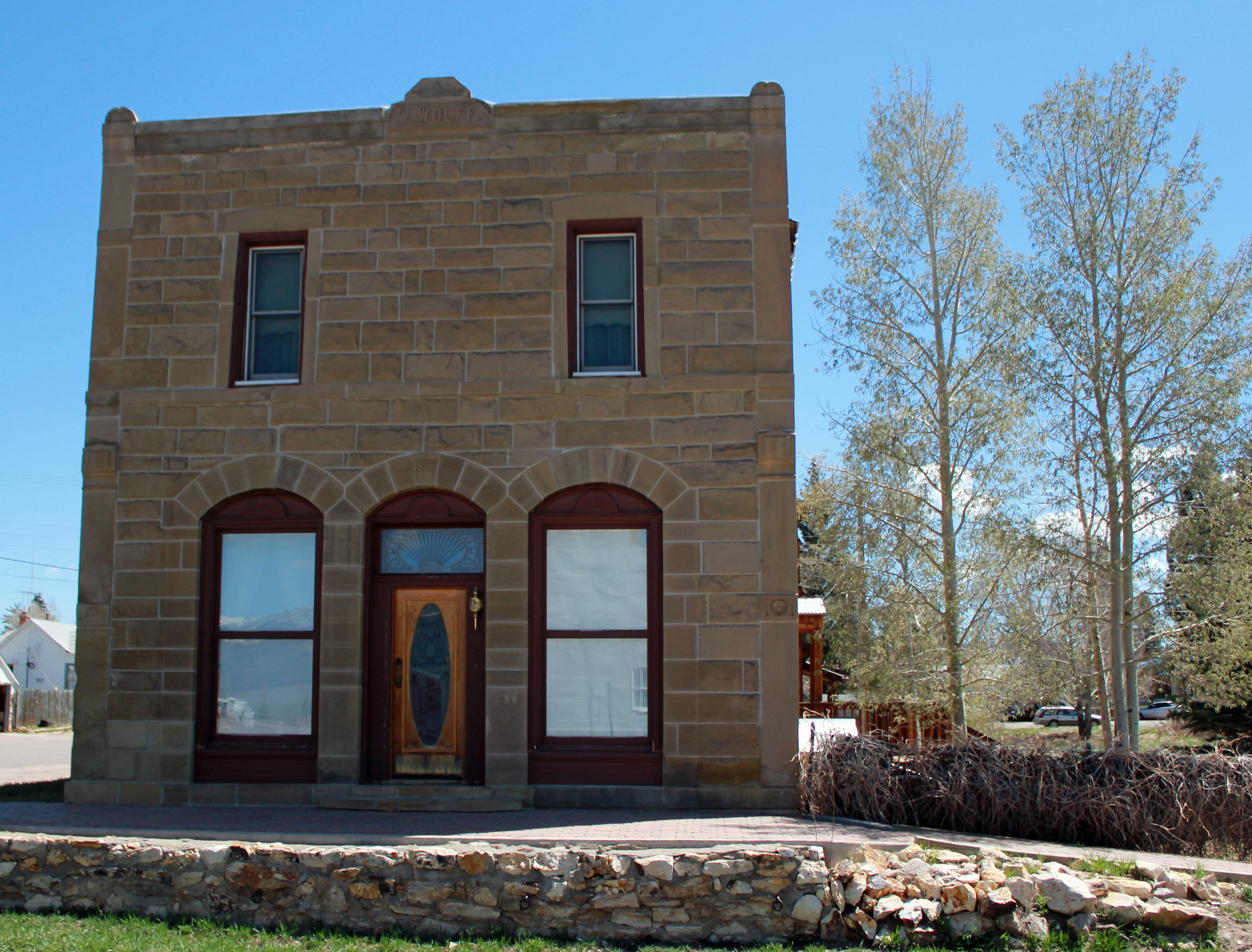

- Location within Colorado
- Location: 201 Second St., Westcliffe, Colorado
- Coordinates: 38°08′04″N 105°28′05″W
- Area: less than one acre
- Built: 1887
- Built by: William Wolff
- Architectural style: Romanesque, Vernacular Romanesque
- NRHP reference No.: 87001288
- Added to NRHP: November 5, 1987

The National Hotel, also known as the Wolff Building or Hard Time Hotel, is a historic hotel in Westcliffe, Colorado. It was built in 1887 and listed on the National Register of Historic Places in 1987.

It is a two-story brick building, designed in a Romanesque Vernacular style. It has a rusticated stone front and a high front parapet, and it is the only commercial building on its block.
