= Two Buttes Gymnasium =

United States historic place in Colorado

- U.S. National Register of Historic Places
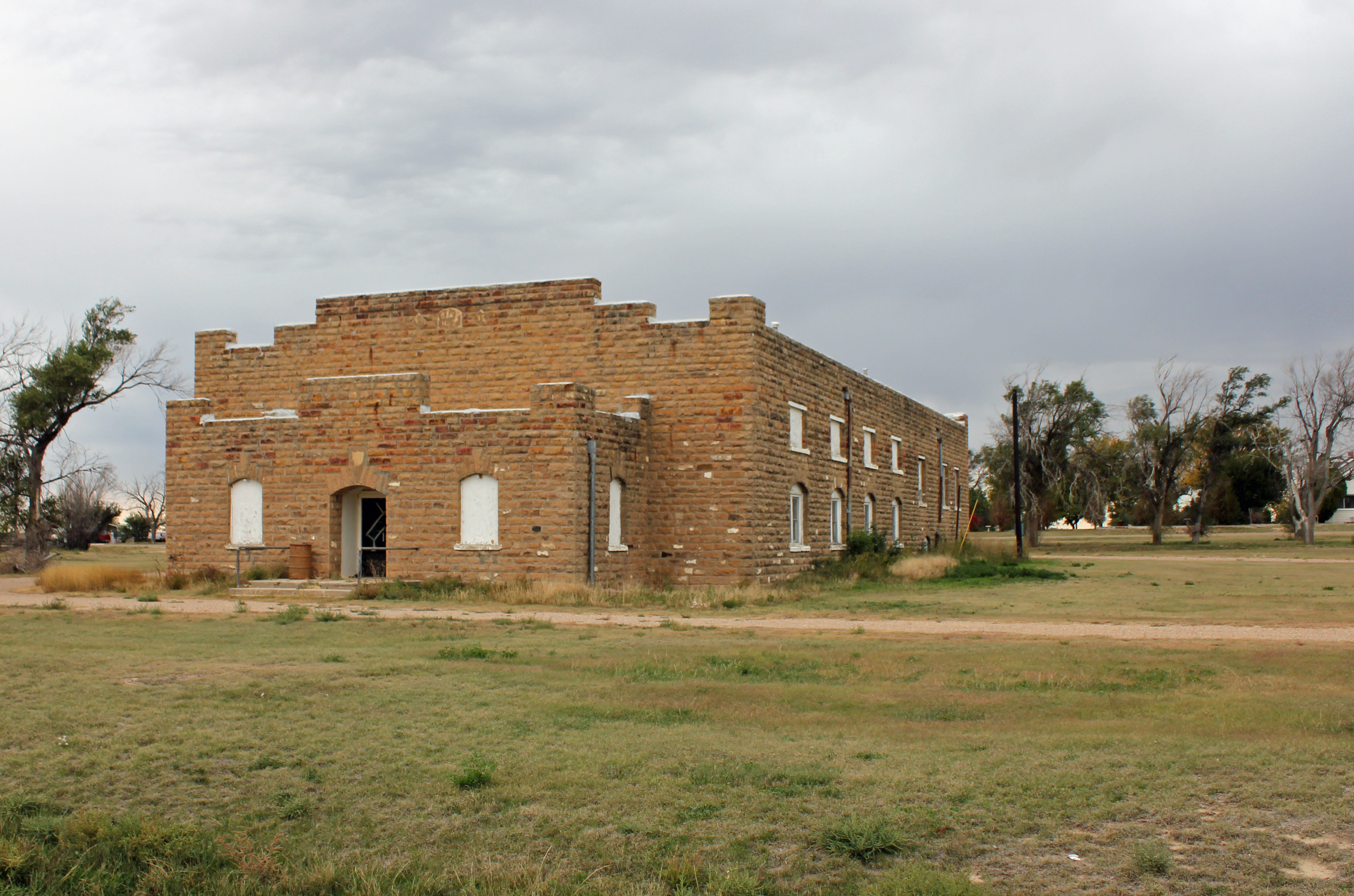
- The property in 2015.

- Location within Colorado Location within the United States
- Location: 5th and C Sts., Two Buttes, Colorado
- Coordinates: 37°33′36″N 102°23′55″W
- Area: 1.7 acres (0.69 ha)
- Built: 1935-37
- Built by: Works Progress Administration
- Architectural style: Late 19th and Early 20th Century American Movements, WPA Rustic
- MPS: New Deal Resources on Colorado's Eastern Plains MPS
- NRHP reference No.: 09001119
- Added to NRHP: December 22, 2009

The Two Buttes Gymnasium is an ashlar sandstone-walled 60-by-130-foot (18 m × 40 m) single-story gym building located at 5th and C Sts. in Two Buttes, Colorado. It was built during 1935–37 as a Works Progress Administration (WPA) project in style that has been termed WPA Rustic architecture.

The building has served as a sports facility and as a meeting hall. It was listed on the National Register of Historic Places in 2009.

Its construction employed 36 persons, and used stone from eight separate local quarries.
