= Walter and Anna Zion Homestead =

- U.S. National Register of Historic Places
- U.S. Historic district
- Location within Colorado Location within the United States
- Nearest city: Idalia, Colorado
- Coordinates: 39°46′59″N 102°23′15″W
- Area: 1.3 acres (0.53 ha)
- Built: 1910
- Built by: Zion, Walter A.; Zion, Joseph A.
- Architectural style: sod
- NRHP reference No.: 05000652
- Added to NRHP: July 6, 2005

The Walter and Anna Zion Homestead near Idalia, Colorado dates from 1910. It includes sod house architecture. The main house, a "soddy," was built in 1910 by Walter Zion and others. The homestead was listed on the National Register of Historic Places in 2005. The listing included eight contributing buildings, two other contributing structures, and one contributing site in an 1.27-acre (0.51 ha) area.
