= Hotel Holly–Haswell Hotel =

- U.S. National Register of Historic Places
- U.S. Historic district
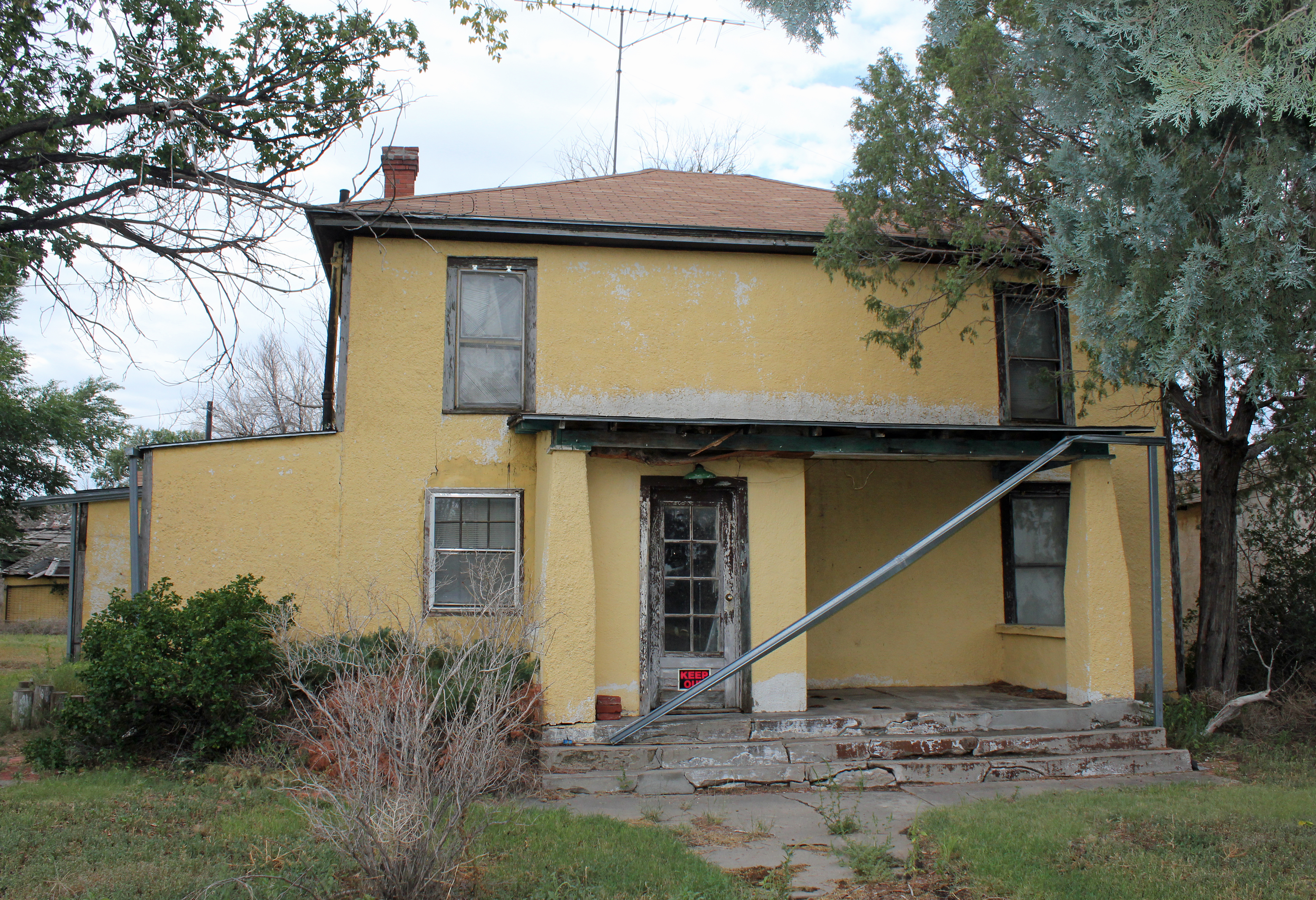

- Location within Colorado Location within the United States
- Location: 200 4th St. (State Highway 96 and Main Street, southeast corner), Haswell, Colorado
- Coordinates: 38°27′11″N 103°09′48″W
- Area: .4 acres (0.16 ha)
- Built: 1907
- Built by: Acquilla Hollingsworth
- NRHP reference No.: 13000608
- Added to NRHP: August 20, 2013

The Hotel Holly–Haswell Hotel is a historic district in Haswell, Colorado, containing a two-story hotel, a filling station, a bunkhouse, and a chicken coop. It was deemed locally significant as one of the first business buildings in Haswell, and was run as a hostelry for 60 years, until it was closed in the 1990's. It is also significant for association with the Hollingsworth and Rebel and Covalt families, each of which operated the hotel. The hotel is one example of foursquare architecture, also known as a "prairie cube", a complete kit home which could be purchased thru the major mail order catalogs of the time. It is well remembered by long time Haswell residents for its well tended landscaping. The hotel and property were purchased in November, 2023, and rebranded 'The Historic'. It is currently under restoration and is now a private residence. The current owners are working to preserve its history as well as the property, and have plans to open the former gas station as a gift shop and comfort station for the Transamerica Bike Trail, and the former hotel as a model for sustained affordable housing. The project is expected to utilize renewable food resources as part of the landscaping, natural energy sources, and an onsite recreation area, open to use by local residents and the general public. The project will take several years to complete.

It was listed on the National Register of Historic Places in 2013.
