= Hog Park Guard Station =

- U.S. National Register of Historic Places
- Location within Colorado
- Location: Routt National Forest, Jackson County, Colorado near Cowdrey, Colorado
- Coordinates: 40.998971°N 106.814401°W
- Area: less than one acre
- Built: 1910-12
- Architectural style: Log cabin
- NRHP reference No.: 03000960
- Added to NRHP: September 25, 2003

The Hog Park Guard Station, in Routt National Forest in Jackson County, Colorado about 35 miles (56 km) west of Cowdrey, Colorado, was built during 1910 to 1912. It was listed on the National Register of Historic Places in 2003.

The station is a two-room log cabin, built of round logs. It is 14 by 28 feet (4.3 m × 8.5 m) in plan, with an 8 feet (2.4 m) high ceiling, fairly high for a United States Forest Service administrative building, and includes an attic crawl space under the gable.

Besides the cabin, the listing included two other contributing buildings: a log storage shed and a privy.

It is located on the west bank of the Encampment River, in an area that was logged for railroad ties during 1900 to 1907.

The Ellis Trail goes through the complex.
