= Stonington First Methodist-Episcopal Church =

Historic church in Colorado, United States

- U.S. National Register of Historic Places
- Colorado State Register of Historic Properties
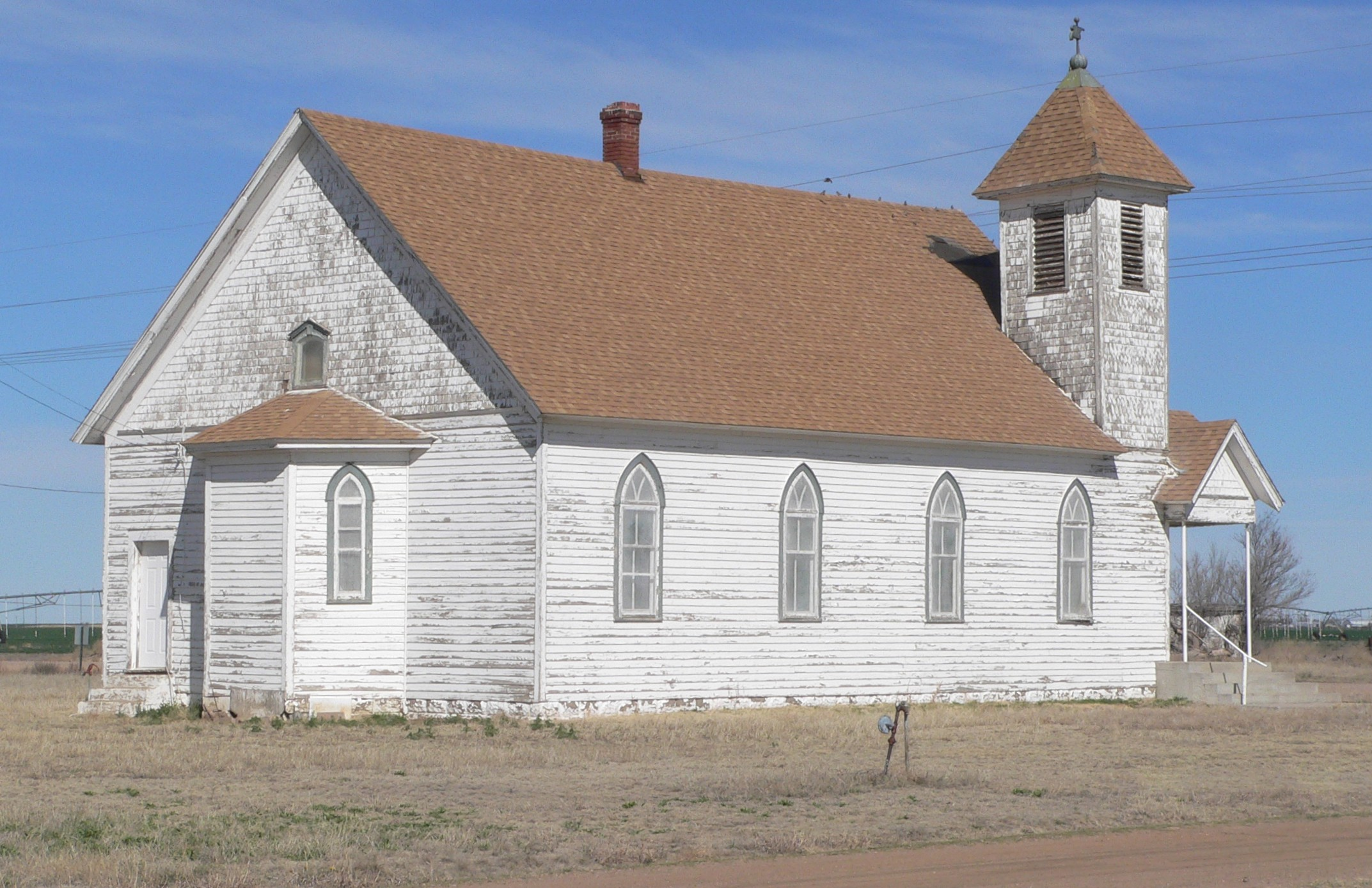

- Location within Colorado Location within the United States
- Location: 48854 Co. Rd. X, Walsh, Colorado
- Coordinates: 37.294423°N 102.188674°W
- Area: 1.1 acres (0.45 ha)
- Built: 1917
- Built by: Murray, W.S.
- Architectural style: Late Gothic Revival
- NRHP reference No.: 96000272
- CSRHP No.: 5BA.555
- Added to NRHP: March 14, 1996

The Stonington First Methodist Episcopal Church is a church at 48854 County Road X in Walsh, Colorado. It was built in 1917 and was added to the National Register of Historic Places in 1996.

It is a one-story, front-gabled, wood-frame structure with elements of Gothic Revival style. It has pointed-arched windows and a bell tower. It is built on a concrete block foundation and has clapboard siding. It is approximately 32 by 52 feet (9.8 m × 15.8 m) in plan.
