= Creede station =

- Wagon Wheel Gap Railroad Station
- U.S. National Register of Historic Places
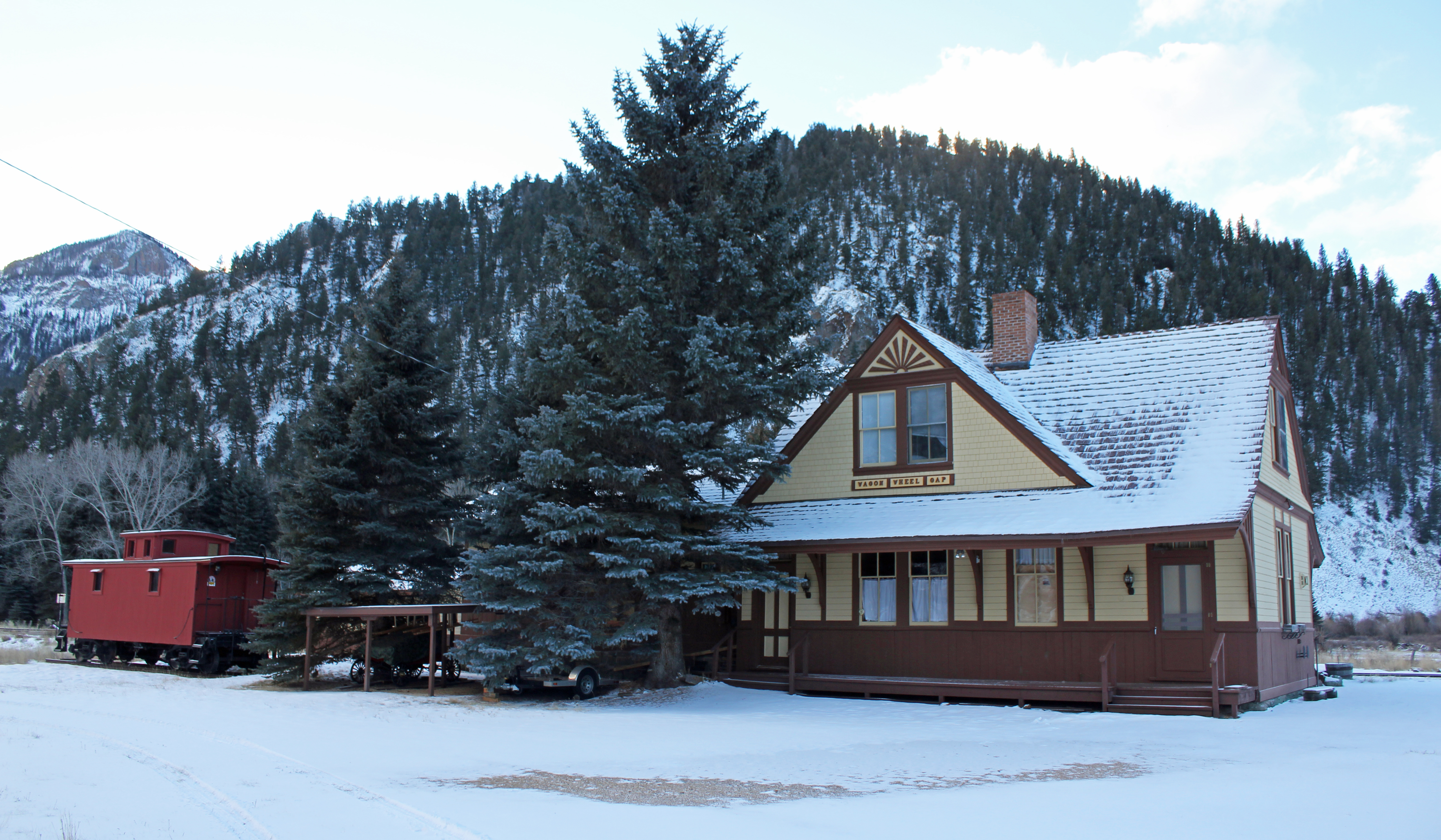
- The station in late 2014.

- Location within Colorado Location within the United States
- Location: Southeast of Creede at Wagon Wheel Gap off State Highway 149
- Nearest city: Creede, Colorado
- Coordinates: 37°45′54″N 106°49′32″W
- Area: less than one acre
- Built: 1883
- NRHP reference No.: 76000563
- Added to NRHP: September 27, 1976

The Wagon Wheel Gap Railroad Station, in Creede, Colorado, was built in 1883. It was listed on the National Register of Historic Places in 1976. It was a station on a narrow-gauge railroad line that opened in July, 1883.
