= Millage Farm Rural Historic District =

Historic district in Colorado, United States

- U.S. National Register of Historic Places
- U.S. Historic district
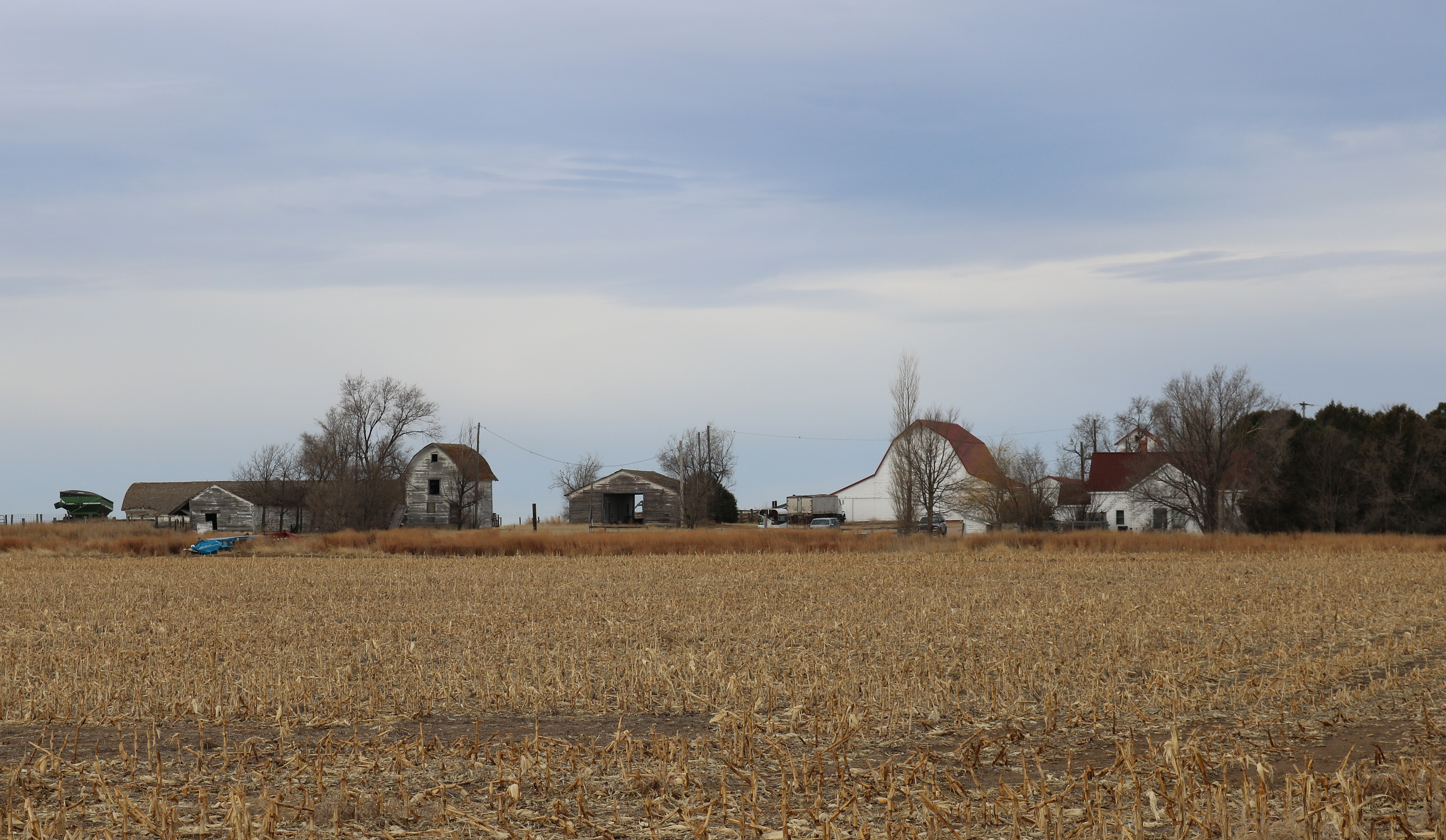

- Location within Colorado Location within the United States
- Location: County Road 18 between U.S. Route 385 and County Road 37, near Holyoke, Colorado
- Coordinates: 40.555466°N 102.306429°W
- Area: 160 acres (0.65 km^{2})
- NRHP reference No.: 13000874
- Added to NRHP: December 3, 2013

The Millage Farm Rural Historic District in Phillips County, Colorado near Haxtun, Colorado, is a 160 acres (0.65 km^{2}) farm which was listed on the National Register of Historic Places in 2013.

The district includes nine contributing buildings, ten contributing structures, one contributing site, and two contributing objects.
