= Eads Community Church =

Historic church in Colorado, United States

- U.S. National Register of Historic Places
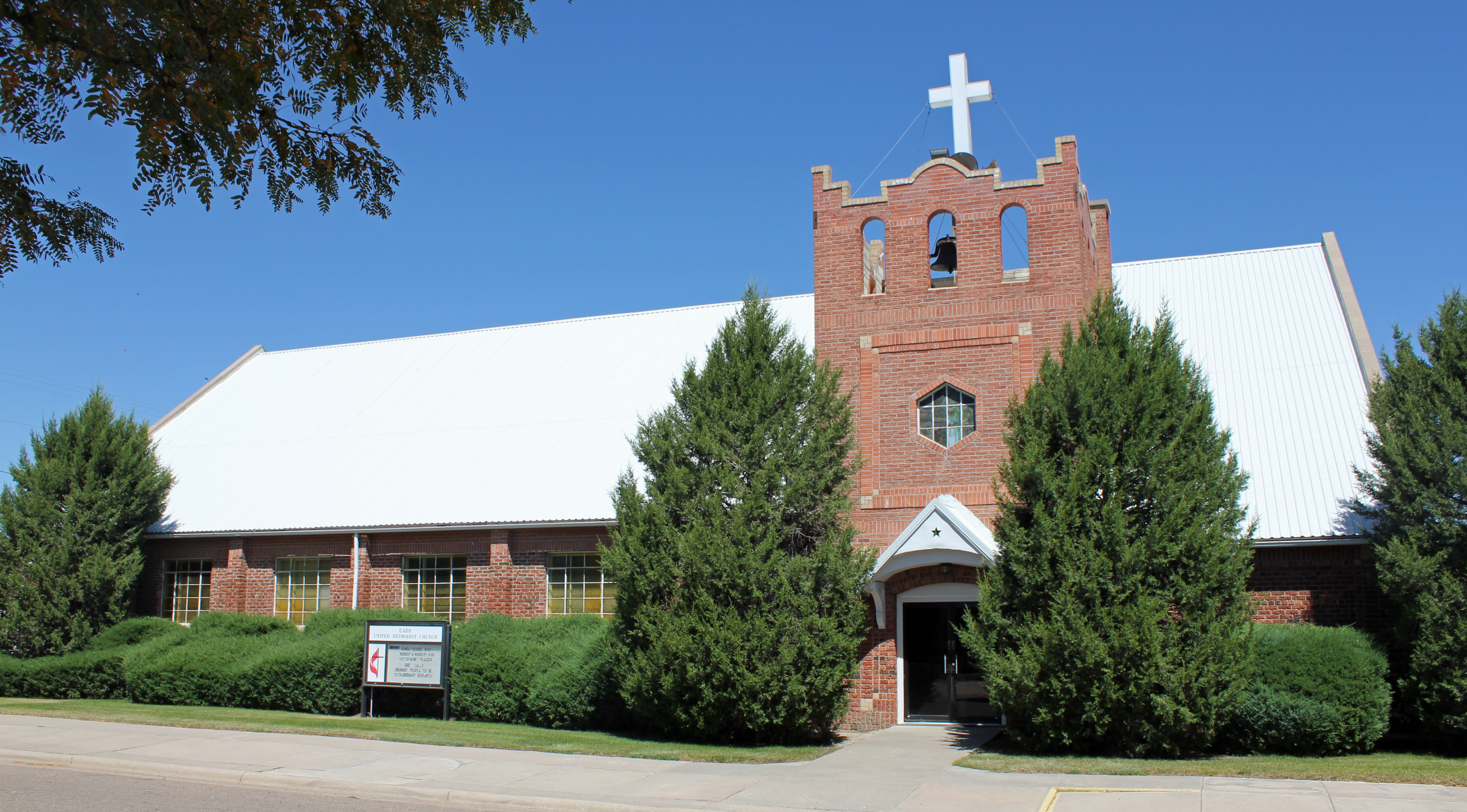
- The church in 2013.

- Location within Colorado Location within the United States
- Location: 110 E. 11th St., Eads, Colorado
- Coordinates: 38.4821°N 102.7807°W
- Architectural style: Jacobean Revival
- NRHP reference No.: 13000606
- Added to NRHP: August 20, 2013

The Eads Community Church is a historic church in Eads, Colorado. It was deemed significant for its Jacobean Revival architecture and as Kiowa County, Colorado's "oldest, largest, and best-preserved religious building."

It was listed on the National Register of Historic Places in 2013.

== History ==
By 1920, Eads was one of only four towns in Kiowa County to have a church. Eads residents determined that they needed a larger church building in 1920, one that could also serve as a community center to host sporting events. Pueblo, Colorado architect William White Stickney submitted designs for the structure in 1920. Projected to cost $35,000, Eads struggled to raise the necessary funds during construction. The town was only about to collect 24% of the promised $30,754 in cash, labor, and materials from residents. Community officials decided that construction would finish on the church basement, which extended to the first floor. Amid the Dust Bowl and Great Depression plans to complete the building were put on hold for decades.

In 1949, resident William T. Holland presented cost-effective plans to complete the church. In January 1951, the project resumes. Pueblo architect John James Wallace, Jr. was tasked with designing the rest of the church. The first services in the completed church were held on October 28, 1951. The building extension provided seating for 220 people. In 1969, the congregation became affiliated with the United Methodist Church, which continues to worship in this building.

== See also ==
- National Register of Historic Places listings in Kiowa County, Colorado
