= Montezuma Schoolhouse =

- U.S. National Register of Historic Places
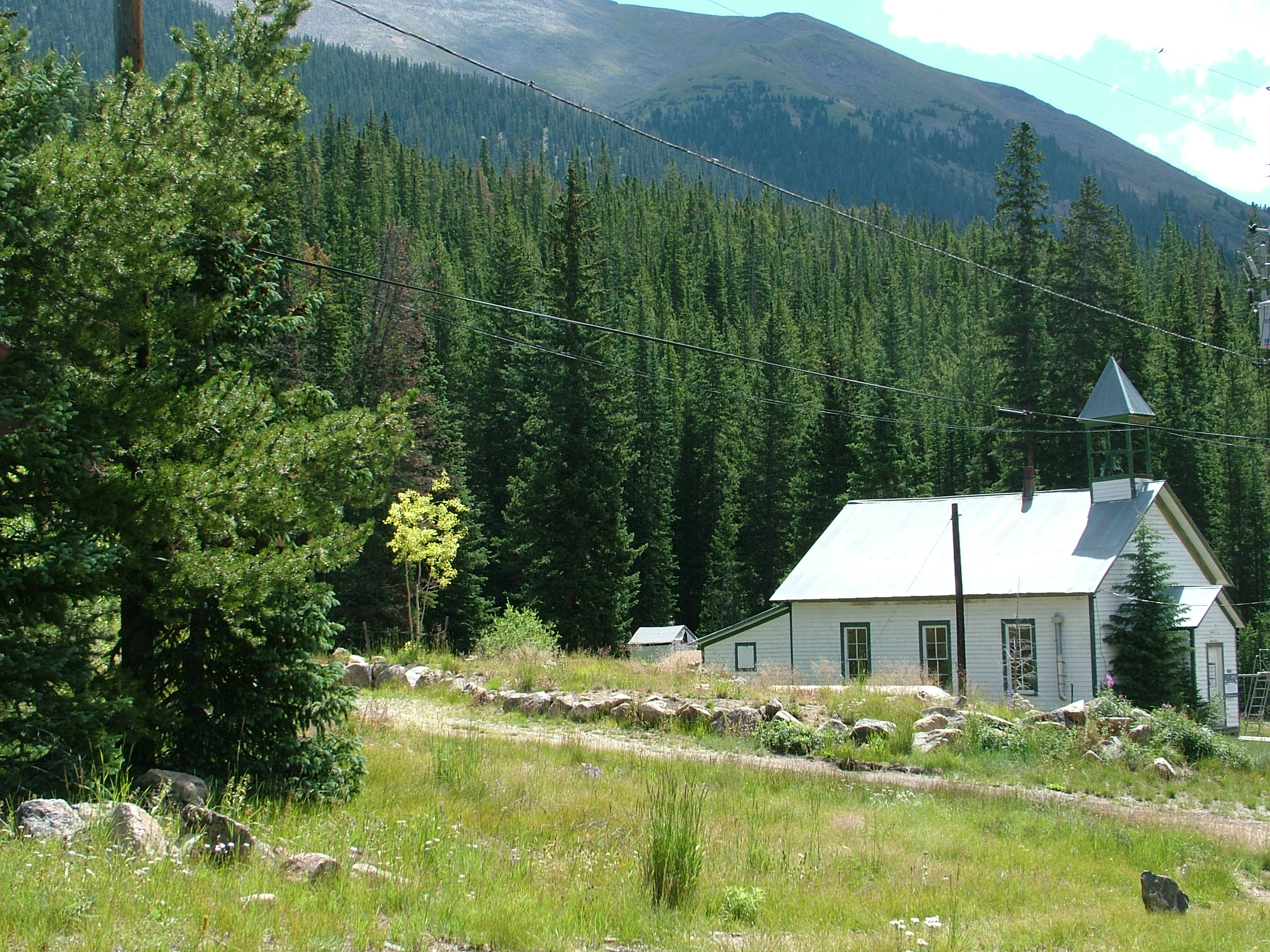

- Location within Colorado
- Location: 5375 Webster St., Montezuma, Colorado
- Coordinates: 39°34′54″N 105°51′59″W
- Area: less than one acre
- Built: 1884
- Built by: Robinson, Dick; Blaisdell, T.C.
- Architectural style: rural school house
- MPS: Rural School Buildings in Colorado MPS
- NRHP reference No.: 06001239
- Added to NRHP: January 9, 2007

The Montezuma Schoolhouse, at 5375 Webster St. in Montezuma, Colorado, was built as a rural schoolhouse in 1884. It was listed on the National Register of Historic Places in 2007.

It is a 24 by 30 feet (7.3 m × 9.1 m) one-room schoolhouse, funded by three bond issues which, combined, raised $1,300 in 1883.
