= Lake Agnes Cabin =

Historic house in Colorado, United States

- U.S. National Register of Historic Places
- Location within Colorado Location within the United States
- Location: 2.5 miles from State Highway 14 near Cameron Pass
- Nearest city: Gould, Colorado
- Coordinates: 40°29′23.4″N 105°54′12″W
- Area: less than one acre
- Built: 1925
- Architect: Poley, Frank
- Architectural style: Late 19th and Early 20th Century American Movements, Rustic
- NRHP reference No.: 07000998
- Added to NRHP: September 26, 2007

The Lake Agnes Cabin, located 2.5 miles from State Highway 14 near Cameron Pass, near Gould, Colorado, was built in 1925. It was listed on the National Register of Historic Places in 2007.

It is a 22-by-18.5-foot (6.7 m × 5.6 m) log cabin built of peeled lodgepole pine logs, located about .8 miles (1.3 km) below Lake Agnes, which is in a cirque. It was used seasonally by park rangers during 1925–2000, and also as a rental cabin years leading up to 2000, and since has been closed.

It was deemed significant "as a good local example of Rustic style architecture. Rustic style architecture is characterized by its natural setting and its use of native materials, most often log and stone. Designed to blend in with the natural environment, these structures are usually vacation homes, hunting lodges, dude ranches, tourism-related buildings or administrative facilities in national and state parks. The Lake Agnes Cabin reflects the design characteristics with its simple form, log walls, rubble foundation, gently pitched roof with wood shingles, and its exposed log interior."
