= Lett Hotel =

- U.S. National Register of Historic Places
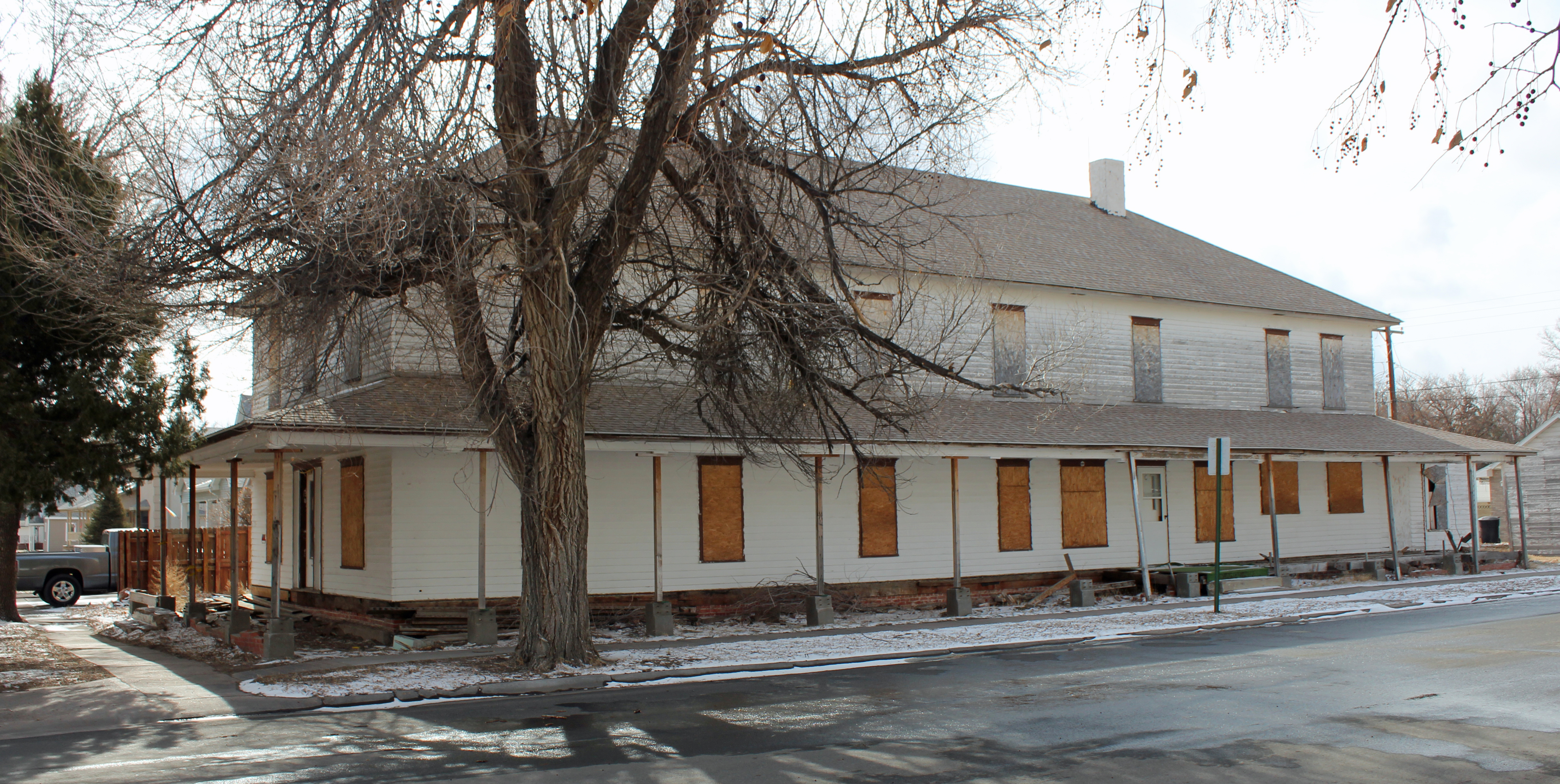
- Photo in February, 2013

- Location within Colorado Location within the United States
- Location: 204 S. Ash, Yuma, Colorado
- Coordinates: 40°7′27″N 102°43′30″W
- Area: less than one acre
- Built: 1916
- Built by: Lett, John A.
- NRHP reference No.: 89002378
- Added to NRHP: January 25, 1990

The Lett Hotel at 204 S. Ash in Yuma, Colorado, now known as the Tumbleweed Hotel, is a historic building, built in 1916, that is listed on the National Register of Historic Places. It was the longest operating hotel in Yuma, and had served 73 years at the time of its NRHP listing in 1990.

It was deemed significant as "one of the most prominent buildings in Yuma", a building that has been photographed and painted, and having been "among the first of its kind in northeastern Colorado with modern conveniences of steam heat and hot and cold running water." At the time of NRHP listing, it was largely the same as when built by John Andrew Lett.
