= Westcliff School =

- U.S. National Register of Historic Places
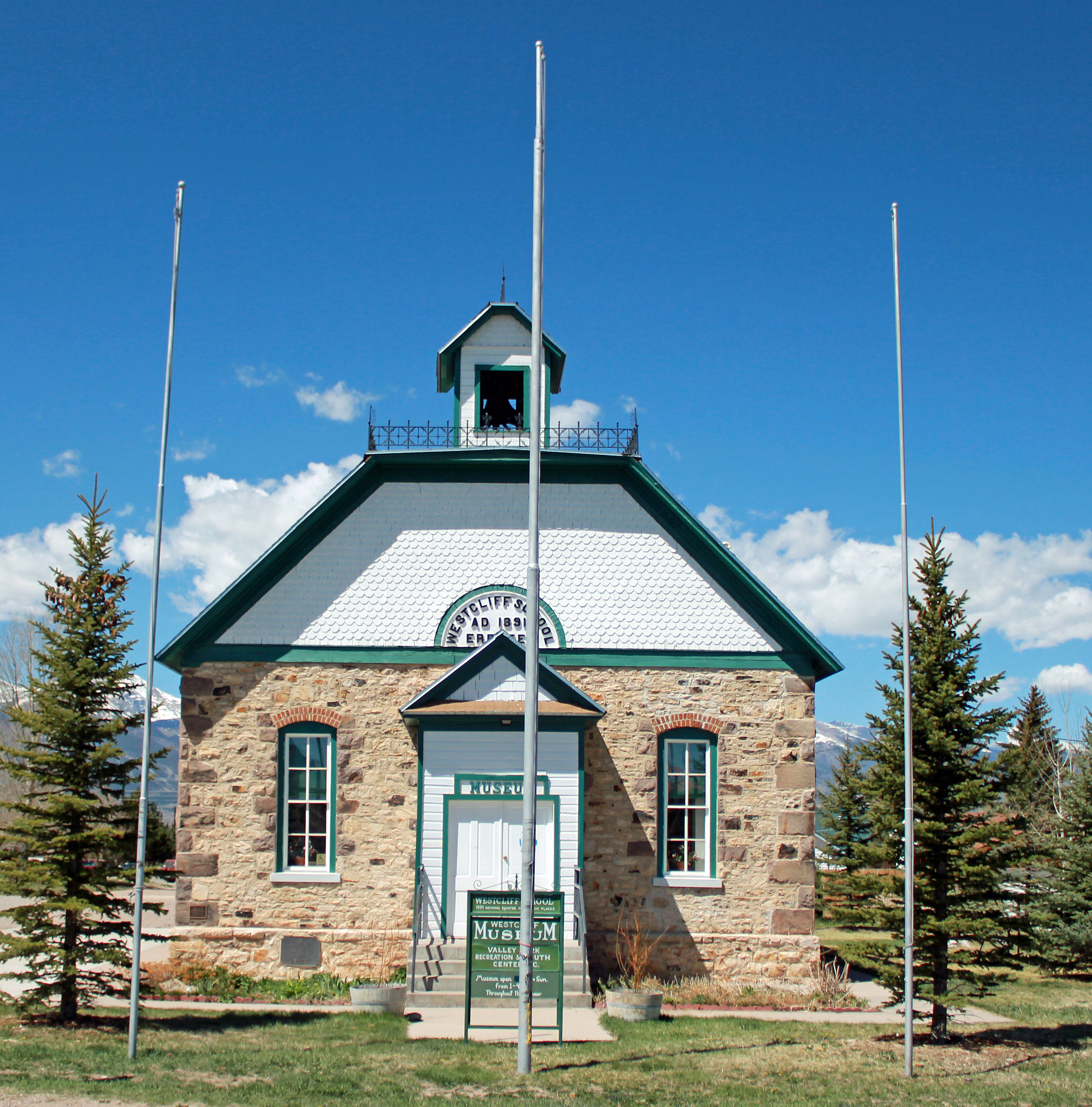

- Location within Colorado
- Location: 304 4th St., Westcliffe, Colorado
- Coordinates: 38°07′57″N 105°27′57″W
- Area: less than one acre
- Built: 1891
- Built by: Archie Scherer
- MPS: Rural School Buildings in Colorado MPS
- NRHP reference No.: 89000999
- Added to NRHP: July 27, 1989

The Westcliff School, at 304 4th St. in Westcliffe, Colorado, was built in 1891. It was listed on the National Register of Historic Places in 1989.

It has also been known as the Old Westcliffe School House. It was built of local field stone by stonemason, Archie Scherer, and is notable for his workmanship in the quoins and placement of dark field stones amongst the lighter ones.

The listing included three contributing buildings.

It was named as consistent with the standards for historic listing set by a 1999 study, "Rural School Buildings in Colorado MPS", but had already been listed.
