= Hargreaves Homestead Rural Historic District =

Historic district in Colorado, United States

- U.S. National Register of Historic Places
- U.S. Historic district
- Location within Colorado Location within the United States
- Location: U.S. Route 385 between County Roads 10 and 12, about 5 miles south of Holyoke, Colorado
- Coordinates: 40°30′19″N 102°17′53″W
- Area: 320 acres (1.3 km^{2})
- NRHP reference No.: 13000873
- Added to NRHP: December 3, 2013

The Hargreaves Homestead Rural Historic District, about five miles south of Holyoke, Colorado, is a 320-acre (1.3 km^{2}) farm property, a historic district that was listed on the National Register of Historic Places in 2013.

In 2013, it included seven contributing buildings, 9 contributing structures, one contributing site, and two contributing objects, as well as 4 non-contributing resources.
