= William Kauffman House =

Historic house in Colorado, United States

- U.S. National Register of Historic Places
- Colorado State Register of Historic Properties
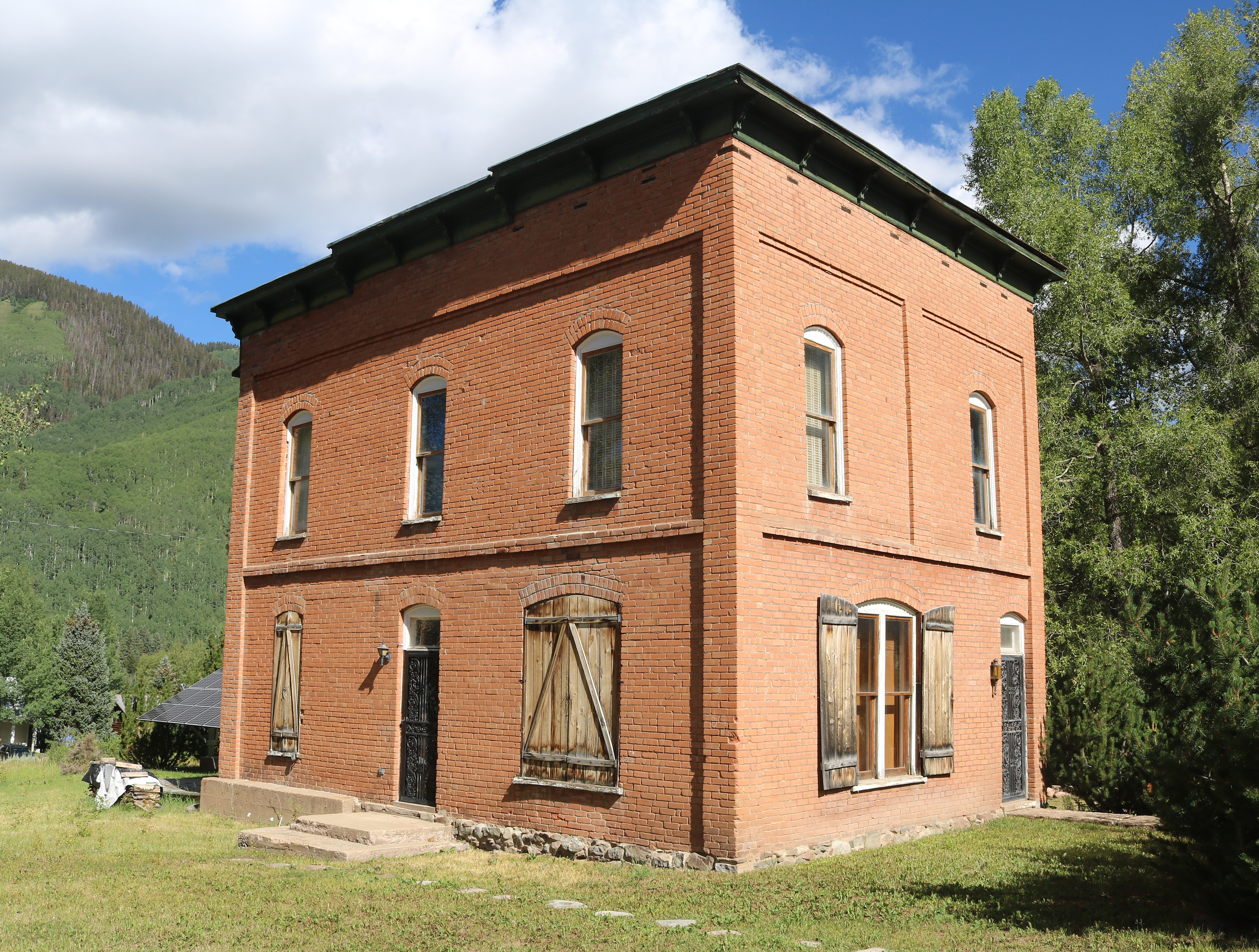
- The property in 2019.

- Location within Colorado Location within the United States
- Location: Silver St., Rico, Colorado
- Coordinates: 37°41′35″N 108°1′45″W
- Area: 0.1 acres (0.040 ha)
- Built: 1891
- Architect: Hill, Frank L.
- Architectural style: Late Victorian
- NRHP reference No.: 82001014
- CSRHP No.: 5DL.227
- Added to NRHP: October 29, 1982

The William Kauffman House is the only historic brick or masonry house in Rico, Colorado. Built in 1891 during the mining boom that drove Rico's population to 4,000, the house was the residence of the Kauffman family until 1915. In the 1940s it was acquired by the Rico Argentine Mining Company and used for worker housing until the mine closed in 1971. Vacant during the 1970s, it was restored in the early 1980s.

The rectangular two-story house has plain detailing with a shallow-pitched roof sloping to the rear. The brick facade is detailed with recessed bays and a wood cornice on the south and east sides. There was once a porch on the west and south sides. The tall windows and doors have segmental-arched tops.

The Kauffman House was placed on the National Register of Historic Places on October 29, 1982.

== See also ==
- National Register of Historic Places listings in Dolores County, Colorado
