= Amherst, Colorado =

Census-designated place in Phillips County, Colorado, United States

- census-designated place
- Location within Phillips County and Colorado
- Coordinates: 40°40′59″N 102°10′21″W
- Country: United Statesa
- State: Colorado
- County: Phillips
- Founded: About 1887

Government
  - Type: unincorporated community
  - Body: Phillips County

Area
  - Total: 0.454 sq mi (1.176 km^{2})
  - Land: 0.454 sq mi (1.176 km^{2})
  - Water: 0 sq mi (0.000 km^{2})
- Elevation: 3,691 ft (1,125 m)

Population (2020)
  - Total: 46
  - Density: 100/sq mi (39/km^{2})
- Time zone: UTC−07:00 (MST)
  - Summer (DST): UTC−06:00 (MDT)
- ZIP Code: 80721
- Area code: 970
- GNIS CDP ID: 2583209
- FIPS code: 08-01915

Amherst is a census-designated place (CDP) and a post office located in Phillips County, Colorado, United States. As of the United States Census 2020, the population of the Amherst CDP was 46.

== History ==
The town of Amherst was established about 1887. The community was named after Amherst, Massachusetts, the native home of a local businessman.

The Amherst Post Office opened on February 18, 1888. Currently, it's ZIP Code is 80721.

Phillips County was founded in 1889, and before that, Amherst was in Weld County.

== Geography ==
The Amherst CDP has an area of 291 acres (1.176 km^{2}), all land.

== Demographics ==
Amherst CDP, Colorado
Year	Pop.	±%
2010	58	—
2020	47	−19.0%
Source: United States Census Bureau

The United States Census Bureau initially defined the Amherst CDP for the United States Census 2010.
