= Haxtun, Colorado =

Town in Phillips County, Colorado, United States

- Town
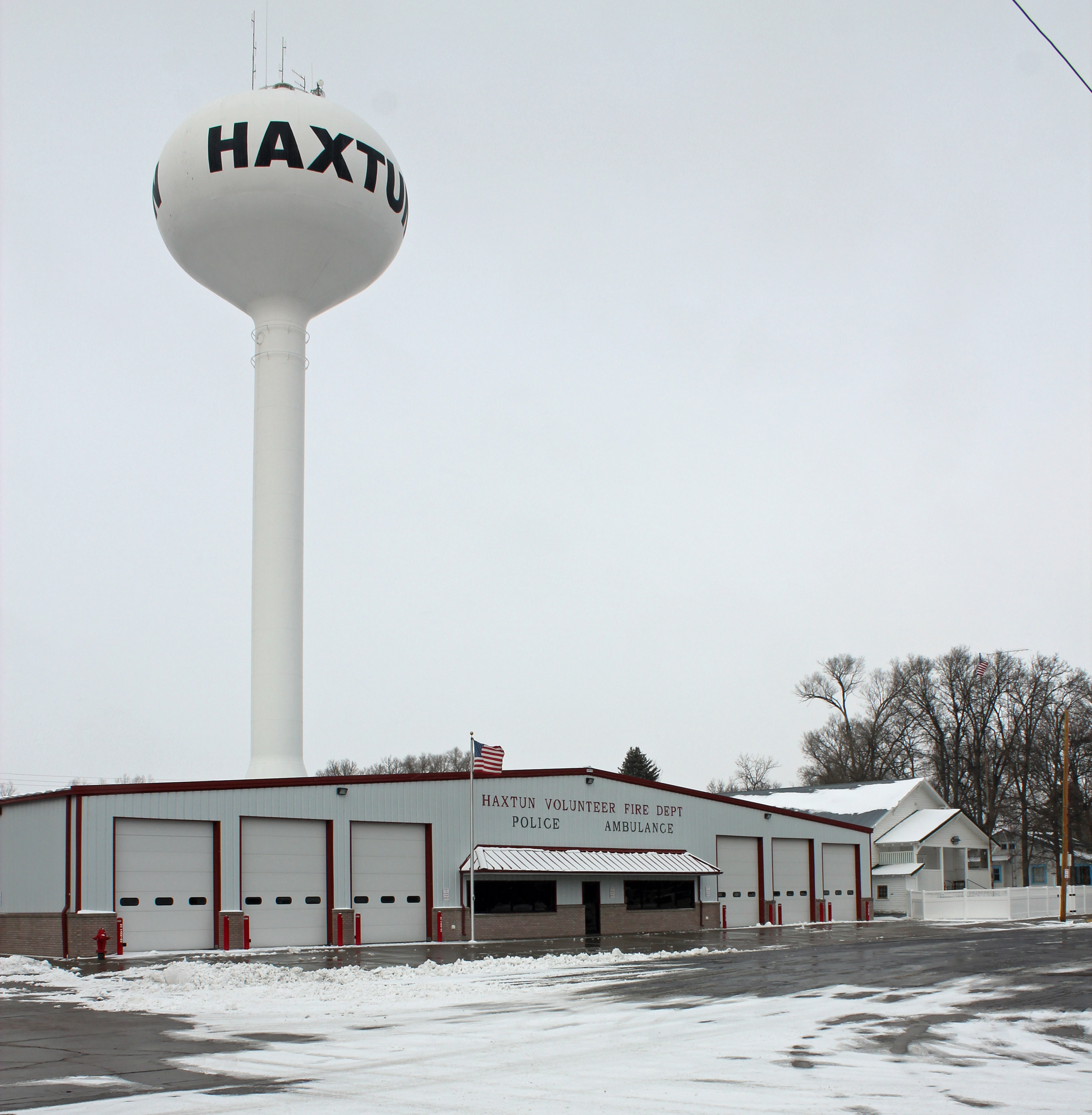
- Fire department & police station (2013)

- Location within Phillips County and Colorado
- Coordinates: 40°38′31″N 102°37′35″W
- Country: United States
- State: Colorado
- County: Phillips
- Incorporated: July 30, 1909

Area
  - Total: 0.595 sq mi (1.542 km^{2})
  - Land: 0.595 sq mi (1.542 km^{2})
  - Water: 0 sq mi (0.000 km^{2})
- Elevation: 4,032 ft (1,229 m)

Population (2020)
  - Total: 981
  - Density: 1,650/sq mi (636/km^{2})
- Time zone: UTC−7 (MST)
  - Summer (DST): UTC−6 (MDT)
- ZIP Code: 80731
- Area code: 970
- FIPS code: 08-34960
- GNIS ID: 2412738
- Website: Town website

Haxtun is a statutory town in Phillips County, Colorado, United States As of the 2020 United States census, its population was 981.

== Geography ==
At the 2020 United States census, the town had a total area of 381 acres (1.542 km^{2}), all of it land.

== Demographics ==
Historical population
Census	Pop.	Note	%±
1910	341		—
1920	1,118		227.9%
1930	1,027		−8.1%
1940	985		−4.1%
1950	1,006		2.1%
1960	990		−1.6%
1970	899		−9.2%
1980	1,014		12.8%
1990	952		−6.1%
2000	982		3.2%
2010	946		−3.7%
2020	981		3.7%
U.S. Decennial Census

As of the census of 2010, there were 946 people, 405 households, and 257 families residing in the town. The racial makeup of the town was 96.4% White, 0.10% African American, 0.7% Native American, 0.2% Asian, 0.10% Pacific Islander, 1.0% from other races, and 1.50% from two or more races. Hispanic or Latino of any race were 3.8% of the population.

There were 405 households, out of which 26.7% had children under the age of 18 living with them, 52.8% were married couples living together, 7.9% had a female householder with no husband present, and 36.5% were non-families. 34.1% of all households were made up of individuals, and 34.1% had someone living alone who was 65 years of age or older. The average household size was 2.26 and the average family size was 2.93.

In the town, the population was spread out, with 26.6% under the age of 18, and 73.4% were 18 years of age or older. The median age was 39.9 years. For every 100 females, there were 112.3 males. For every 100 females age 18 and over, there were 111.4 males.

== See also ==
- List of municipalities in Colorado
