= Crowley, Colorado =

Town in Colorado, US

- Statutory town
- Town of Crowley
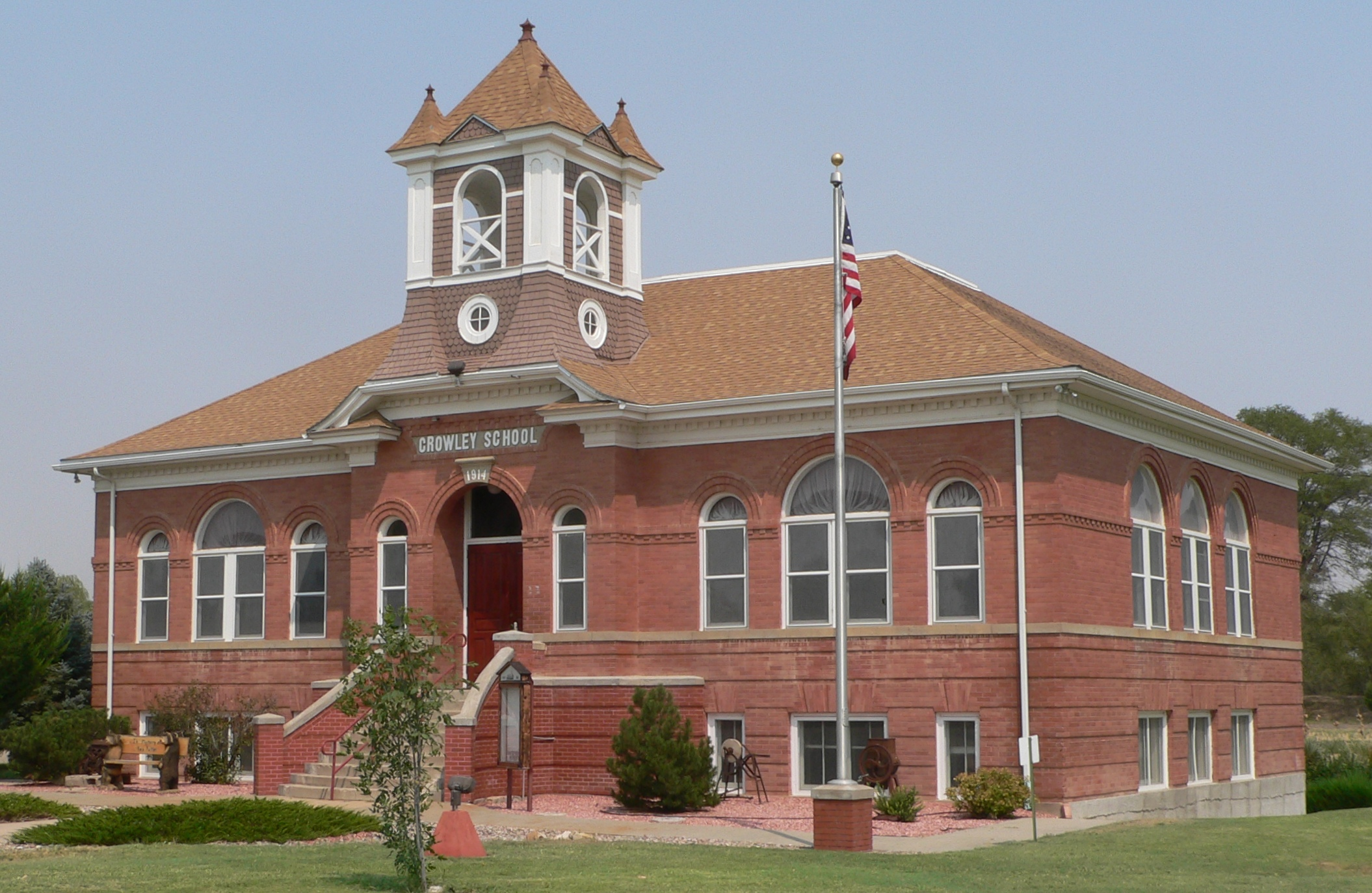
- Crowley County Heritage Center, formerly the Crowley School, listed in National Register of Historic Places (2012)

- Location within Crowley County and Colorado
- Coordinates: 38°11′37″N 103°51′35″W
- Country: United States
- State: Colorado
- County: Crowley
- Incorporated: October 10, 1921

Government
  - Type: statutory town

Area
  - Total: 0.225 sq mi (0.584 km^{2})
  - Land: 0.225 sq mi (0.584 km^{2})
  - Water: 0 sq mi (0.000 km^{2})
- Elevation: 4,354 ft (1,327 m)

Population (2020)
  - Total: 166
  - Density: 736/sq mi (284/km^{2})
- Time zone: UTC−07:00 (MST)
  - Summer (DST): UTC−06:00 (MDT)
- ZIP code: 81033-81034
- Area codes: 719
- GNIS town ID: 2412394
- Website: Town of Crowley

Crowley is a statutory town located in Crowley County, Colorado, United States. The town population was 166 at the 2020 United States census.

== History ==
The Crowley, Colorado, post office opened on December 18, 1914, and the Town of Crowley was incorporated on October 10, 1921.

== Geography ==
Crowley is located in southern Crowley County. Colorado State Highway 96 leads east 6 miles (10 km) to Ordway, the county seat, and west 43 miles (69 km) to Pueblo. Highway 207 leads south 6 miles (10 km) to Manzanola and U.S. Route 50.

At the 2020 United States census, the town had a total area of 144 acres (0.584 km^{2}), all of it land.

== Demographics ==
Historical population
Census	Pop.	Note	%±
1920	224		—
1930	323		44.2%
1940	318		−1.5%
1950	379		19.2%
1960	265		−30.1%
1970	216		−18.5%
1980	192		−11.1%
1990	225		17.2%
2000	187		−16.9%
2010	176		−5.9%
2020	166		−5.7%
U.S. Decennial Census

== Notable person ==
Jonathan Almanzar - founder of Chick'nCone.

== See also ==
- List of populated places in Colorado
