= Colorado State Highway 209 =

State highway in Colorado, United States

State Highway 209
- South Higgins Avenue
- SH 209 highlighted in red

Route information
- Maintained by CDOT
- Length: 1.528 mi (2.459 km)

Major junctions
- South end: US 50 south of Boone
- North end: SH 96 in Boone

Location
- Country: United States
- State: Colorado
- Counties: Pueblo

Highway system
- Colorado State Highway System; Interstate; US; State; Scenic
← SH 207	→ SH 224

State Highway 209 (SH 209) is a state highway in Pueblo County, Colorado. SH 209's southern terminus is at U.S. Route 50 (US 50) south of Boone, and the northern terminus is at SH 96 in Boone.

== Route description ==
SH 209 runs 1.5 miles (2.4 km), beginning heading perpendicular away from US 50 south of Boone. South Higgins Avenue, what the highway is named at this point, turns slightly from northeast to north as it heads through farmland terrain. The route crosses the Arkansas River as well as another one of its tributaries before entering Boone. Meeting First Street, the roadway comes to an end without continuation at SH 96, Main Street.

== Major intersections ==
The entire route is in Pueblo County.

Location	mi	km	Destinations	Notes
	0.000	0.000	US 50 – Pueblo, Fowler	Southern terminus
Boone	1.528	2.459	SH 96 – Pueblo, Ordway	Northern terminus
1.000 mi = 1.609 km; 1.000 km = 0.621 mi

== See also ==
- List of state highways in Colorado
