= Manzanola station =

Manzanola
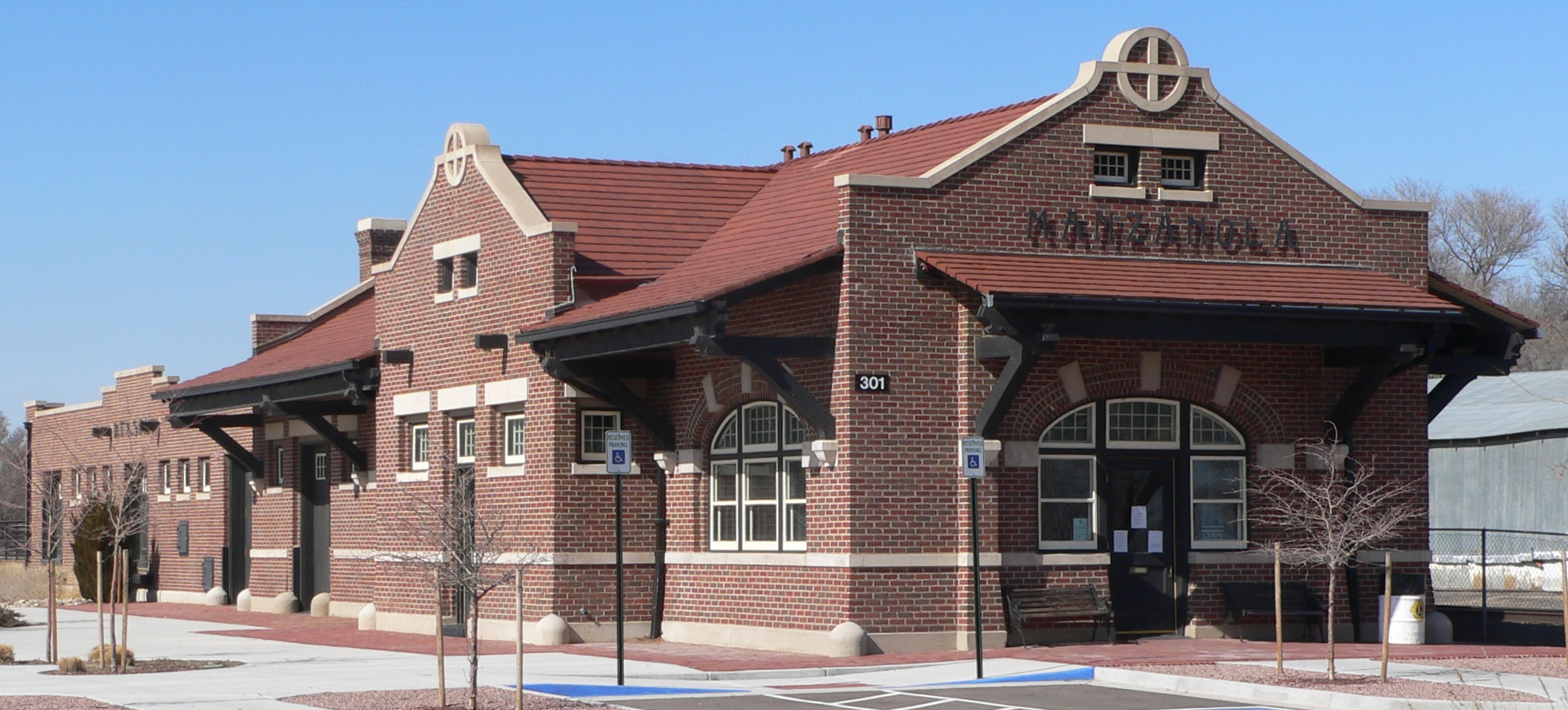
- Manzanola depot, seen from the southeast; the railroad tracks are behind the building

General information
- Location: 212 North Grand Avenue; Manzanola, Colorado
- Coordinates: 38°6′35.2″N 103°52′0.4″W
- System: Former ATSF passenger rail station
- Owner: Building: City of Manzanola; Track: BNSF Railway
- Platforms: 1 side platform
- Tracks: 1

Construction
- Structure type: at-grade

History
- Opened: 1913
- Closed: 1973

Former services
Preceding station	Atchison, Topeka and Santa Fe Railway	Following station
Fowler toward Denver	Denver Branch	Rocky Ford toward La Junta
- Santa Fe Railway Manzanola Depot
- U.S. National Register of Historic Places
- Location within Colorado Location within the United States
- Location: 212 North Grand Ave., Manzanola, Colorado
- Coordinates: 38°6′35.2″N 103°52′0.4″W
- Area: 2.27 acres (0.92 ha)
- Built: 1913
- Architect: Atchison, Topeka and Santa Fe Railway
- Architectural style: Mission Revival
- MPS: Railroads in Colorado, 1858-1948 MPS
- NRHP reference No.: 04000363
- Added to NRHP: April 28, 2004
Location

The Santa Fe Railway Monzanola Depot, also known as Manzanola station, was an Atchison, Topeka and Santa Fe Railway in Manzanola, Colorado. Now used as a town hall, the property has been on the National Register of Historic Places since April 28, 2004.

== History ==
The single track railroad line to Pueblo, Colorado was completed by the Santa Fe Railway in 1876. Although the track existed, the depot wasn't built until 1913. The station first opened with both freight and passenger services. The depot was finally closed by the railroad in 1973. The station remained vacant until, in 1976, it was donated to the city of Manzanola. In 1991, a senior center opened in the former waiting room area.

== Restoration ==
Most of the building has been in a steady decline since the donation to the town in 1976. Until 2007, the only part of the station in use was the east side, with a small senior center. With the grand opening in November 2007, the new depot houses the town hall and police department. The construction was done by White Construction Group.
