= Rocky Ford =

Rocky Ford or Rockyford may refer to:

Canada

- Rocky Ford, Alberta, a locality
- Rockyford, Alberta, a village

United States

- Rocky Ford, Colorado, a city
  - Rocky Ford Station
- Rocky Ford, Georgia, a town
- Rocky Ford, Indiana, an extinct town
- Rocky Ford, North Carolina, a community
- Rocky Ford, Oklahoma, census-designated place
- Rockyford, South Dakota, a community
- Rocky Ford Township, Mellette County, South Dakota

== People ==
- Robert "Rocky" Ford Jr. (1949–2020), American journalist and record producer
