= Manzanola Bridge =

Demolished historical bridge

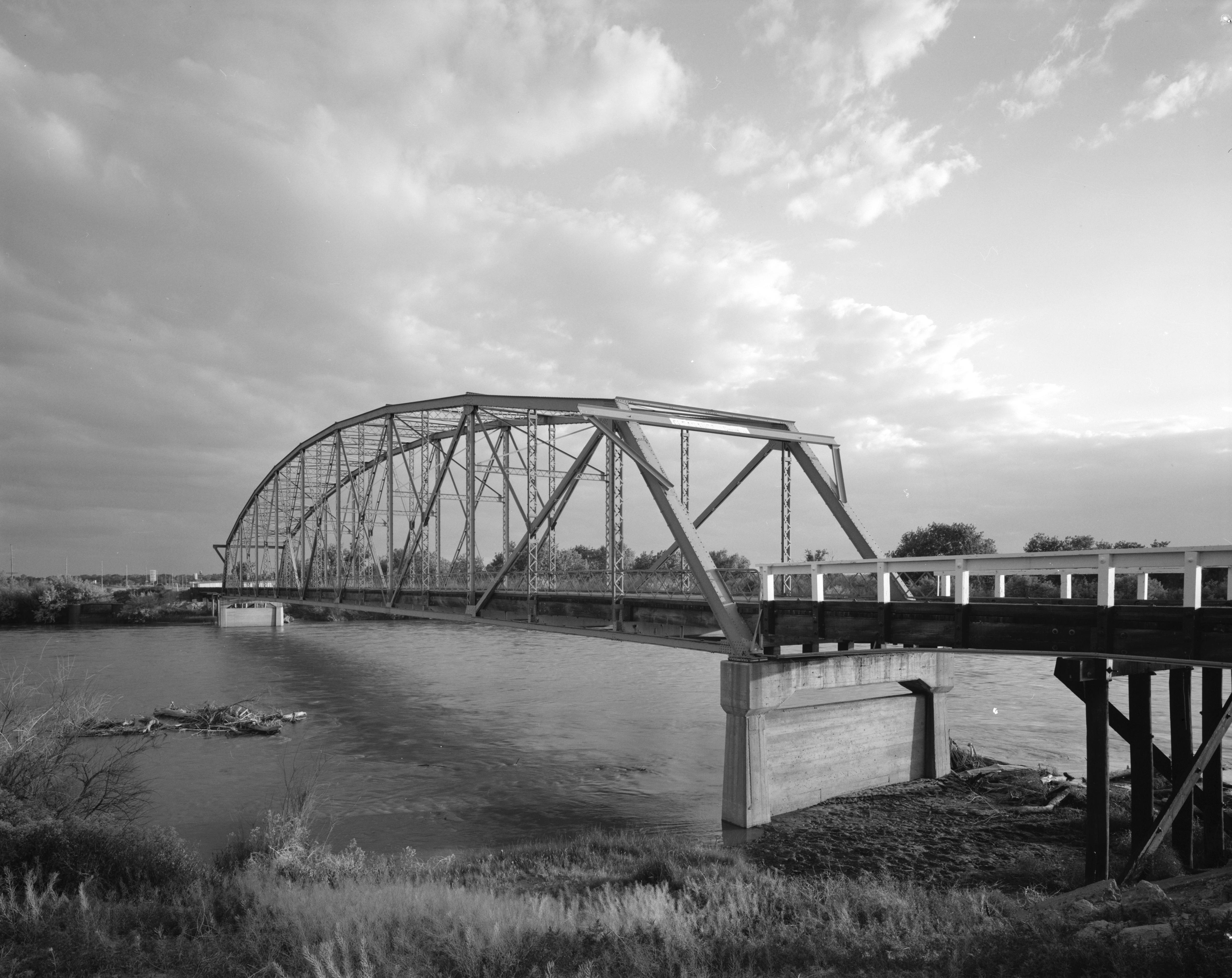
- Manzanola Bridge on Colorado State Highway 207 over Arkansas River, Manzanola, Otero County, Colorado, June 1984
- Coordinates: 38.12713°N 103.86156°W
- Crosses: Arkansas River
- Locale: Crowley County, Colorado
- Other name: Clifton Bridge

Characteristics
- Design: 18-panel Pennsylvania through truss bridge
- Total length: 300.0 ft (91.4 m)
- Width: 19.3 ft (5.9 m)
- Longest span: 440.0 ft (134.1 m)
- Manzanola Bridge
- U.S. National Register of Historic Places
- Nearest city: Manzanola, Colorado
- Built: 1911 (First Manzanola Bridge); 1950 (Second Manzanola Bridge - moved to new location)
- Built by: Patterson-Burghardt Bridge Company
- Architectural style: Truss bridge
- MPS: Vehicular Bridges in Colorado TR
- NRHP reference No.: 85001400
- Added to NRHP: June 24, 1985

Location
- Interactive map of Manzanola Bridge

Manzanola Bridge was a truss bridge which was originally built in 1911 by the Patterson-Burghardt Bridge Company over the Colorado River and later moved over the Arkansas River (on Colorado State Highway 207) in the year 1950. The bridge used to connect the town of Manzanola, Otero County, with Crowley County in Colorado.

== History ==
The first Manzanola Bridge was built in 1908, near Clifton in Mesa County over the Colorado River. It was replaced by a new design in 1950 and moved to a new location over the Arkansas River connecting Manzanola, Colorado with Crowley County, Colorado. At the new location, the new bridge replaced a "three-span pinned truss" which was built in 1908.

On June 24, 1985, the bridge was added to the National Register of Historic Places. In 1994, it was demolished and a more modern structure was constructed to handle the traffic of Colorado State Highway 207.

The 1950s structure was considered one of the earliest rigid-connected vehicular trusses in Colorado and one of seven riveted Pennsylvania through-truss bridges. At the time of its existence, it was recorded as the longest span roadway truss in the state.

On July 7, 1994, the bridge's name was removed from the National Register of Historic Places.

== Gallery ==
This gallery consists of the photographs taken for the Historic American Engineering Record, dated August 18, 1983.

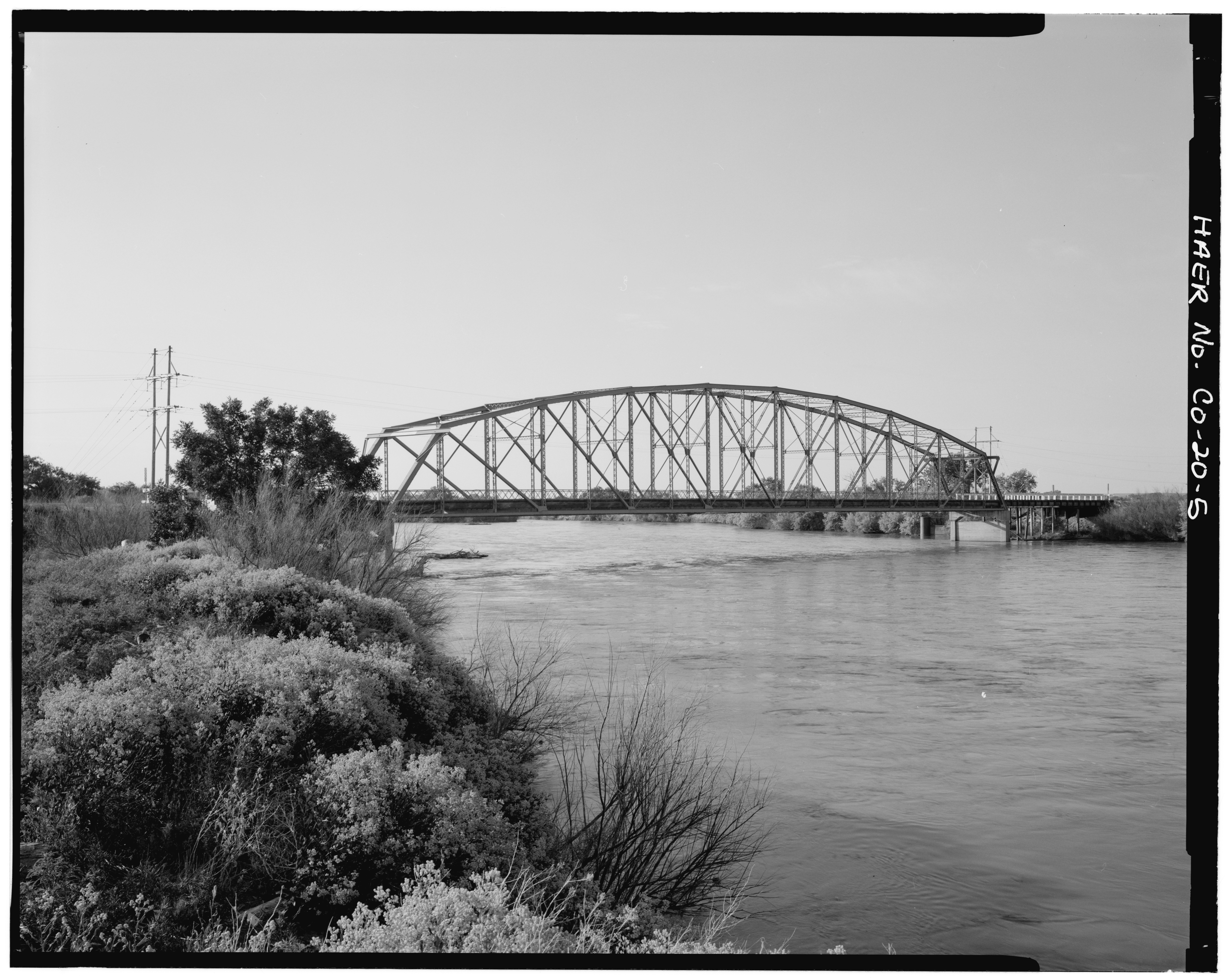
View: Looking east, showing west web

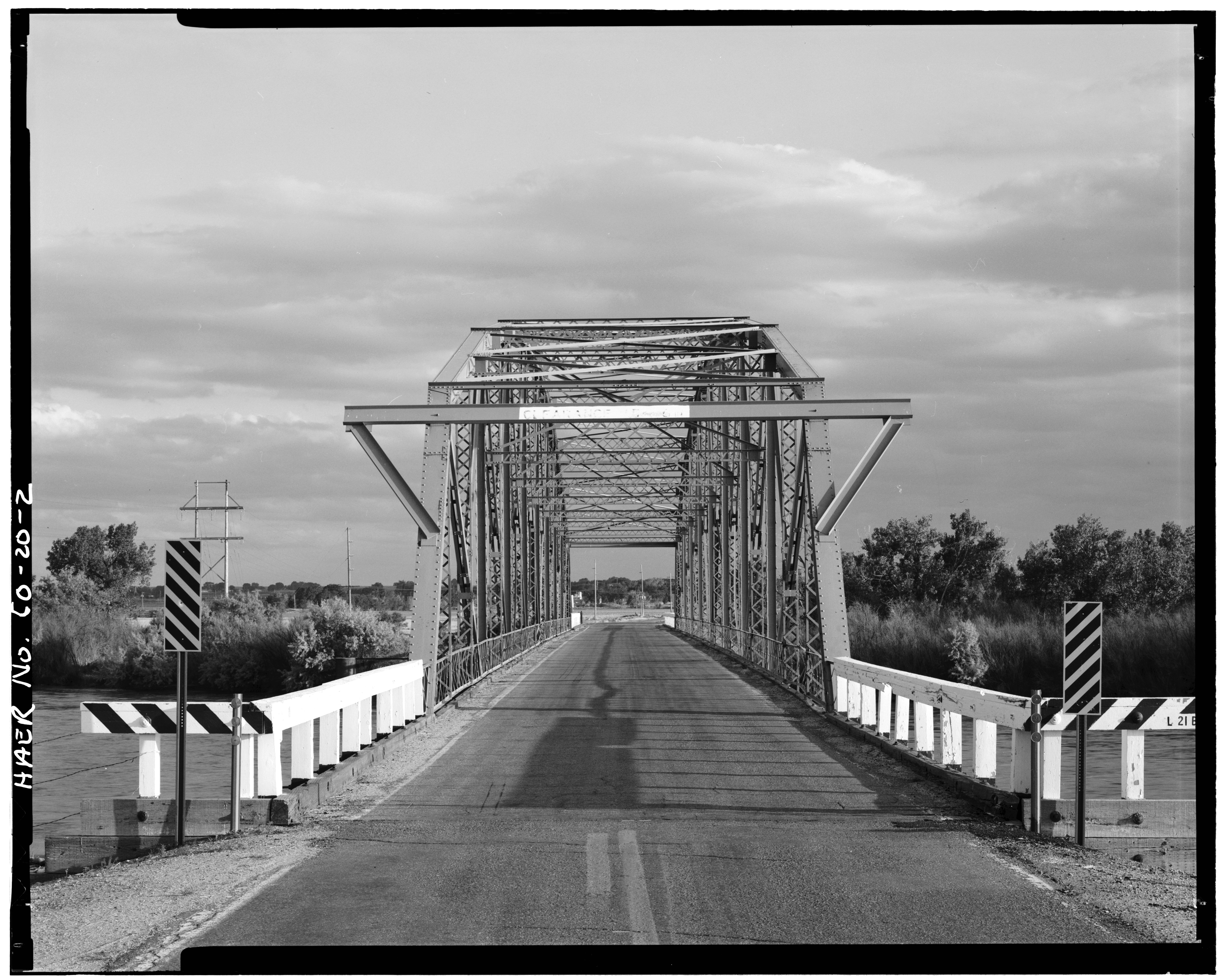
View: Looking south, showing portal

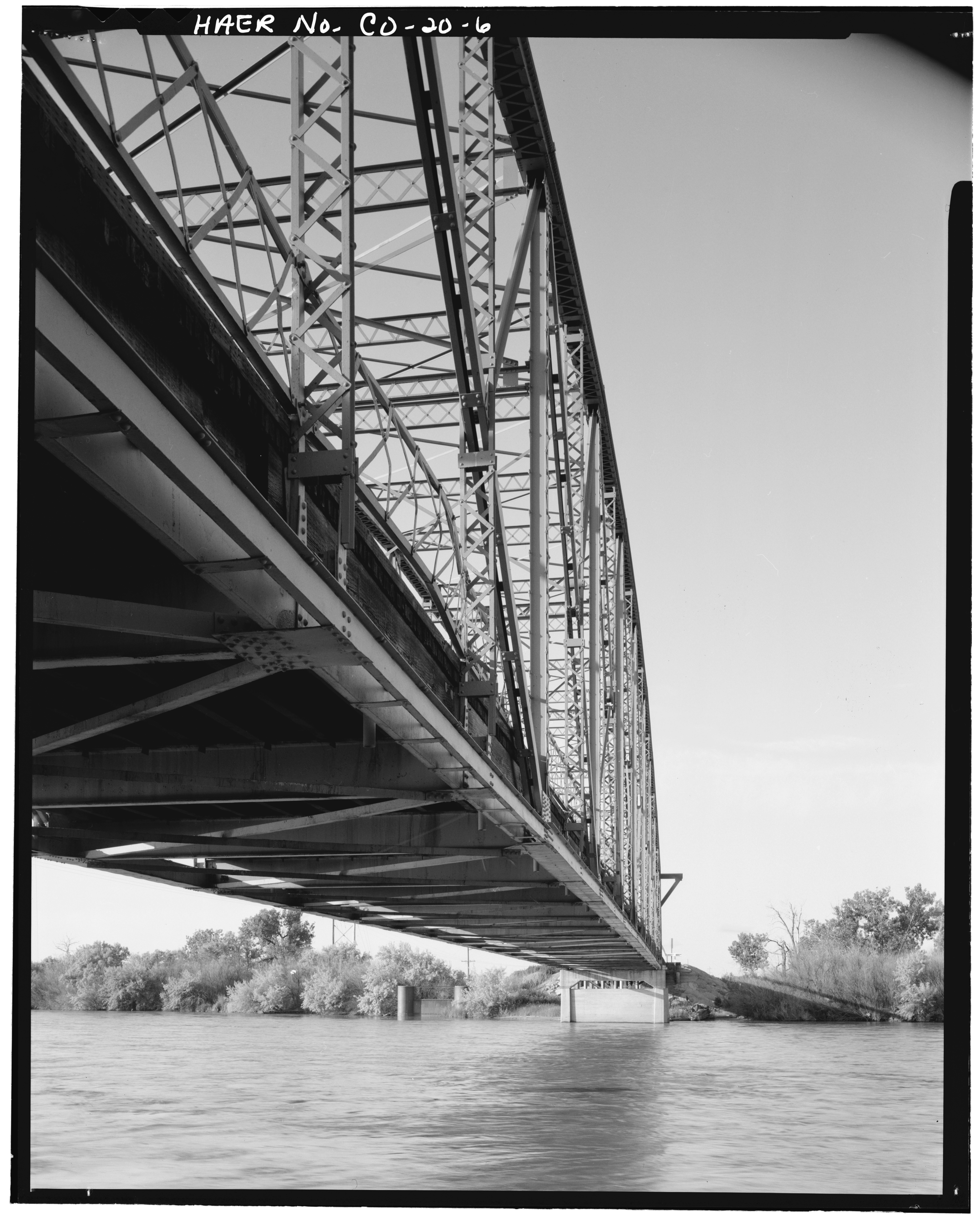
View: Looking southeast, showing bottom chord, floor structure, and west web detail

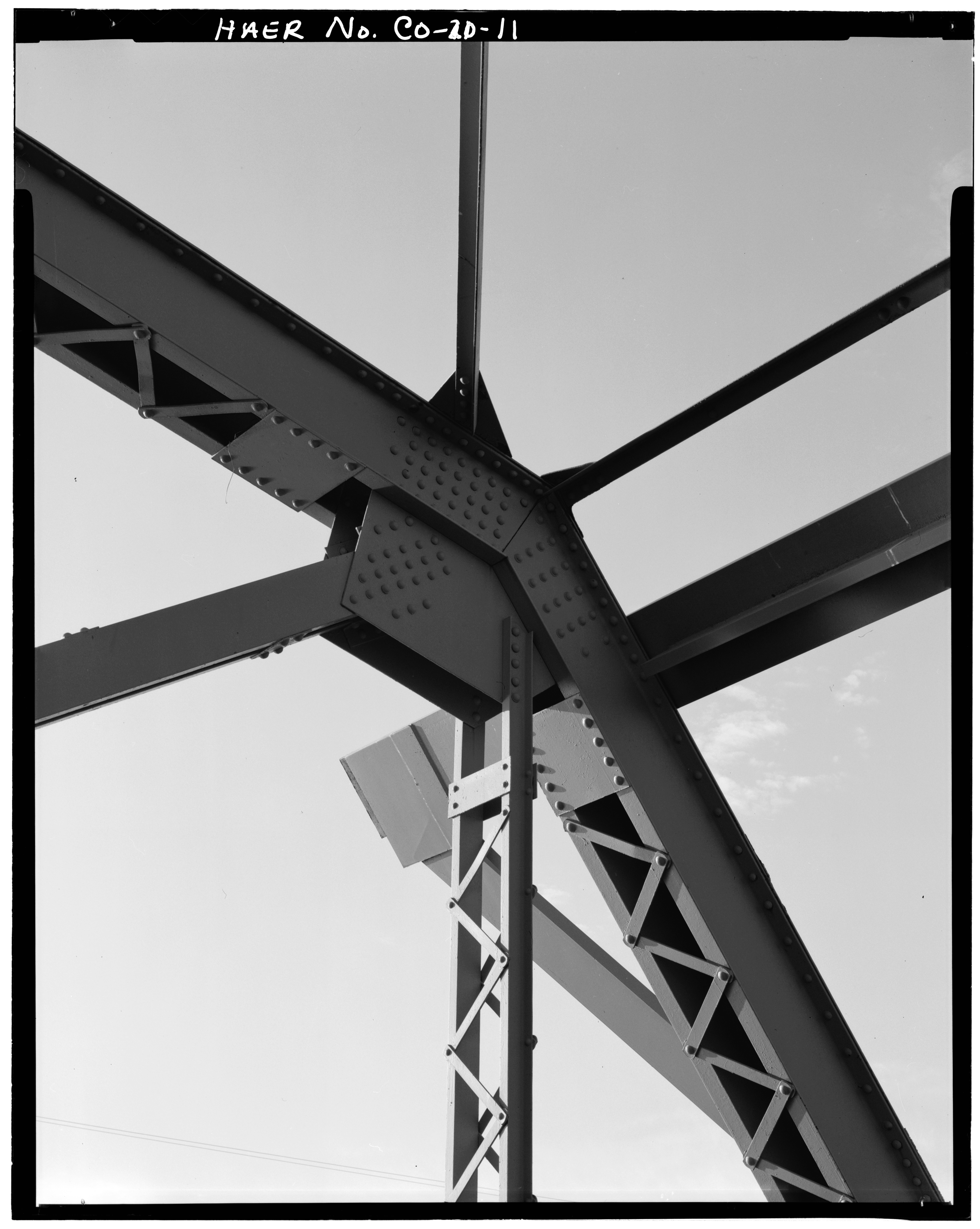
View: Looking southeast, showing upper chord and portal bracing detail

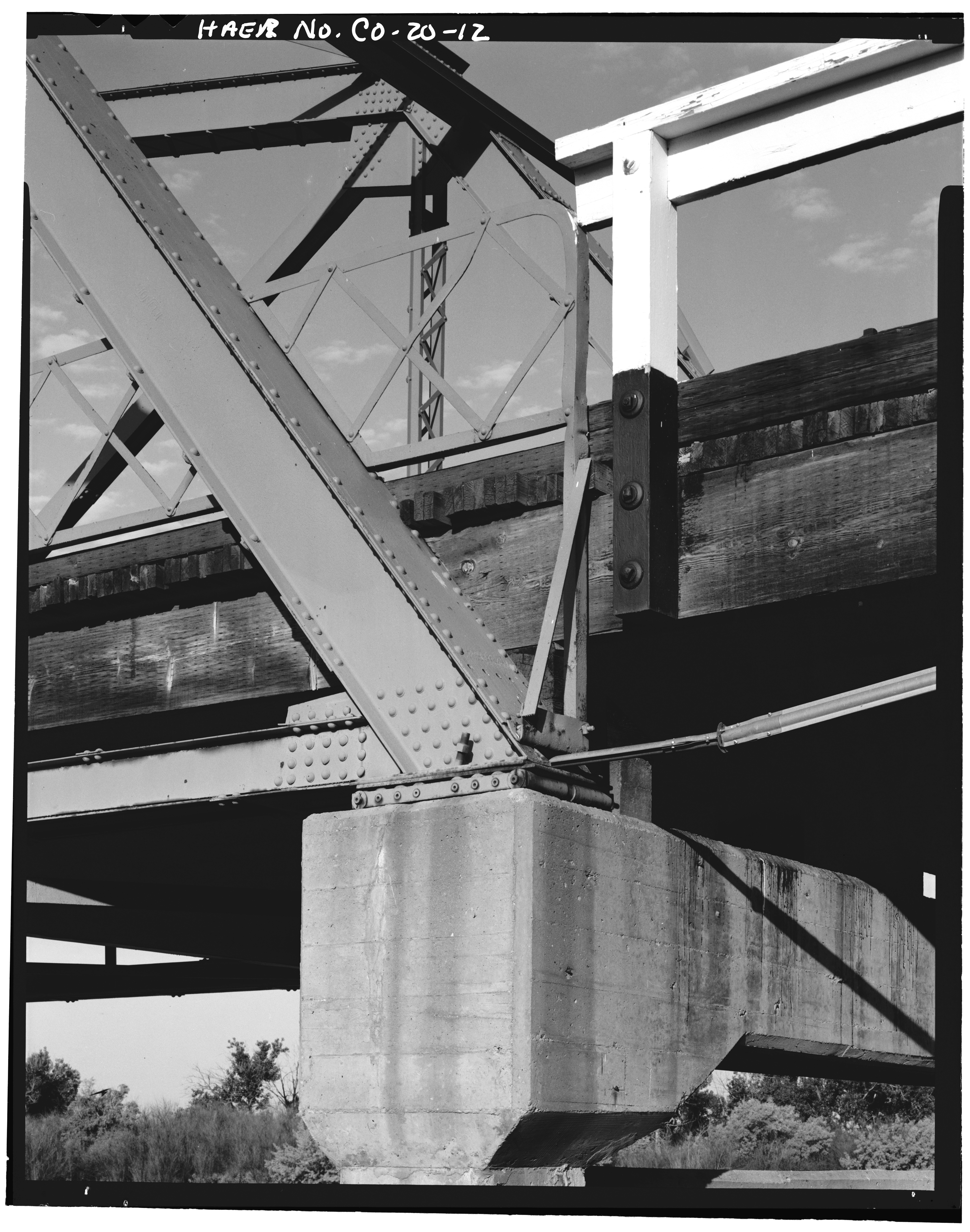
View: Looking southwest, showing pier and roller bearing shoe detail

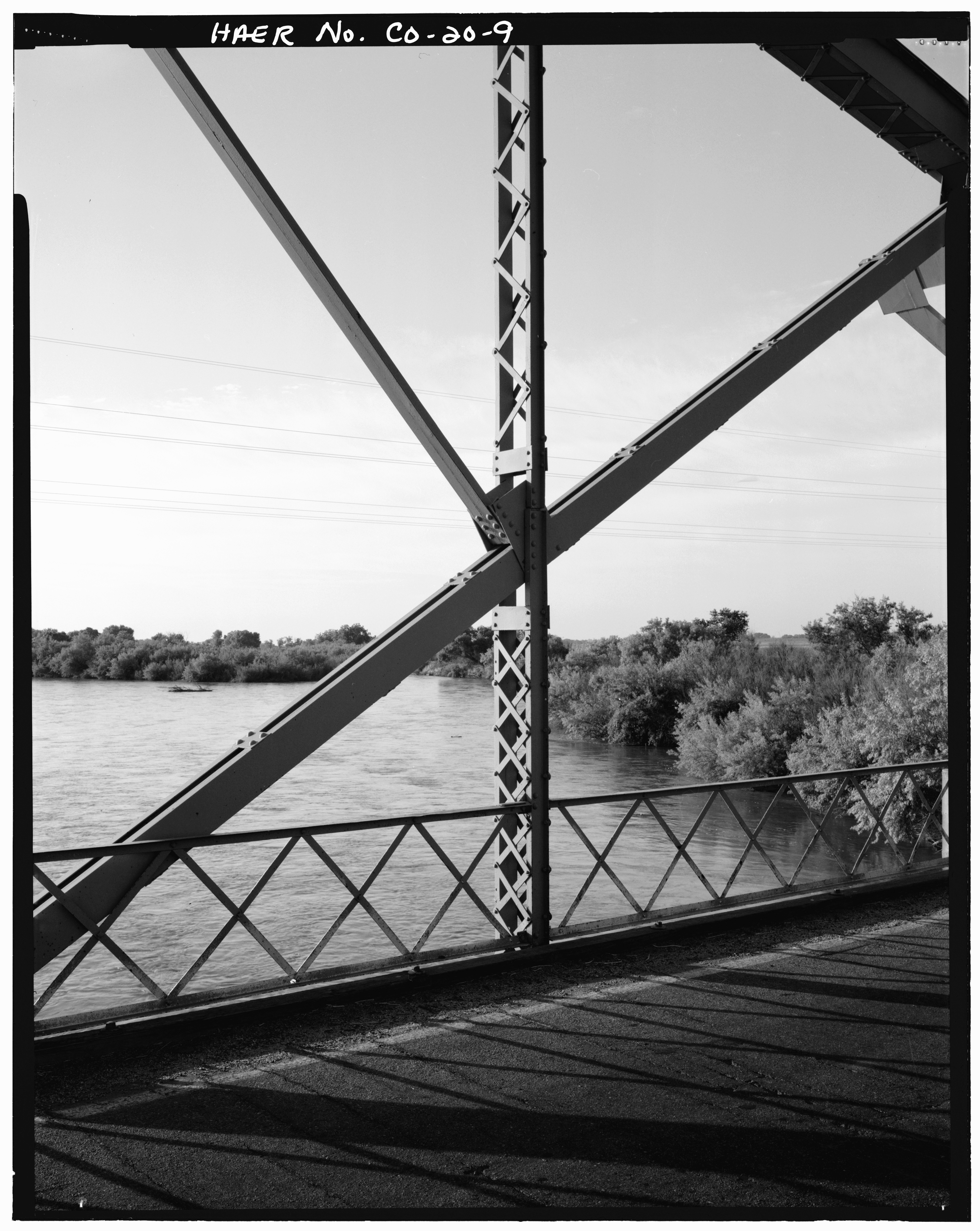
View: Looking southwest, showing vertical, diagonal, and guardrail detail

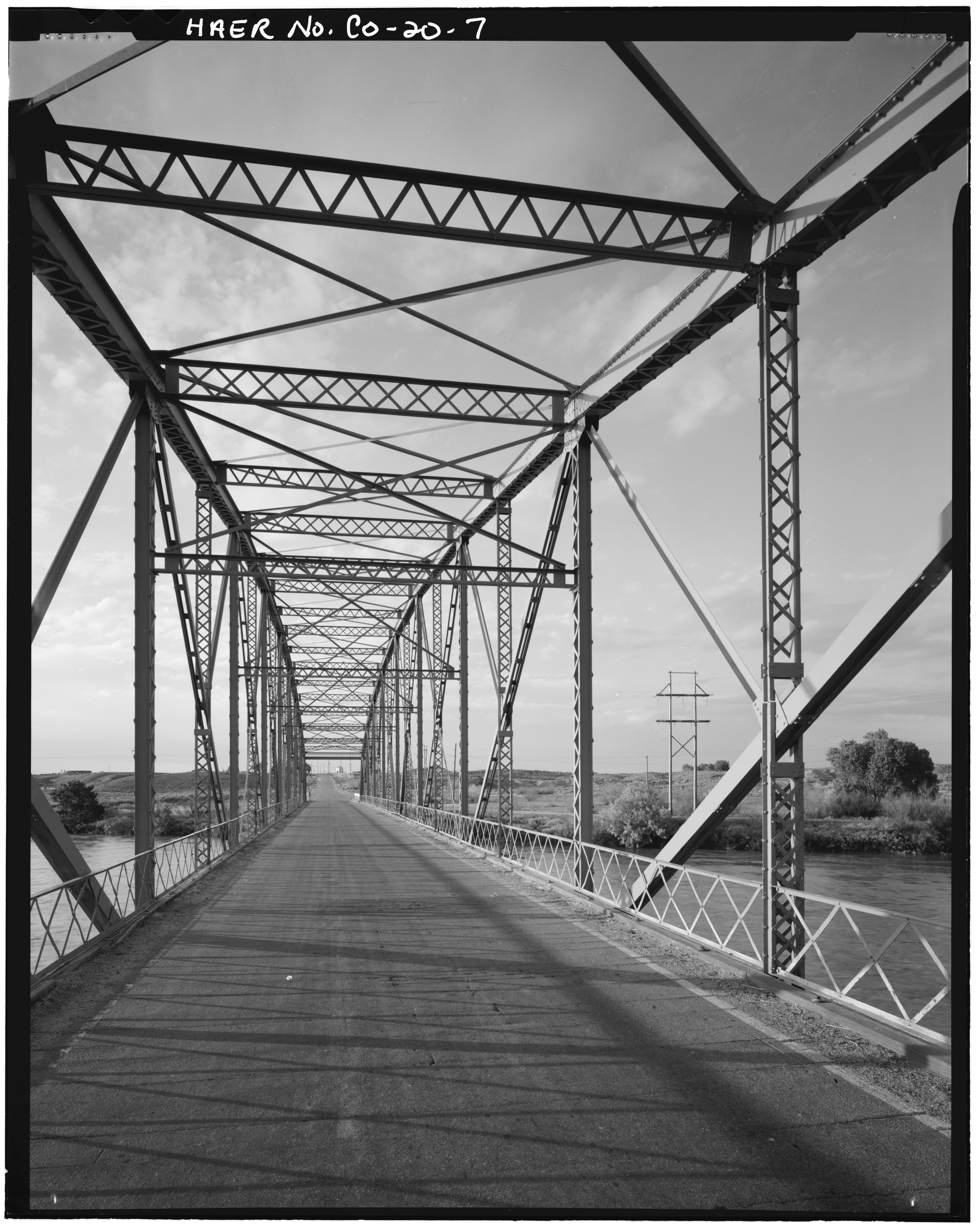
View: Looking south, showing deck, vertical, upper strut and bracing detail

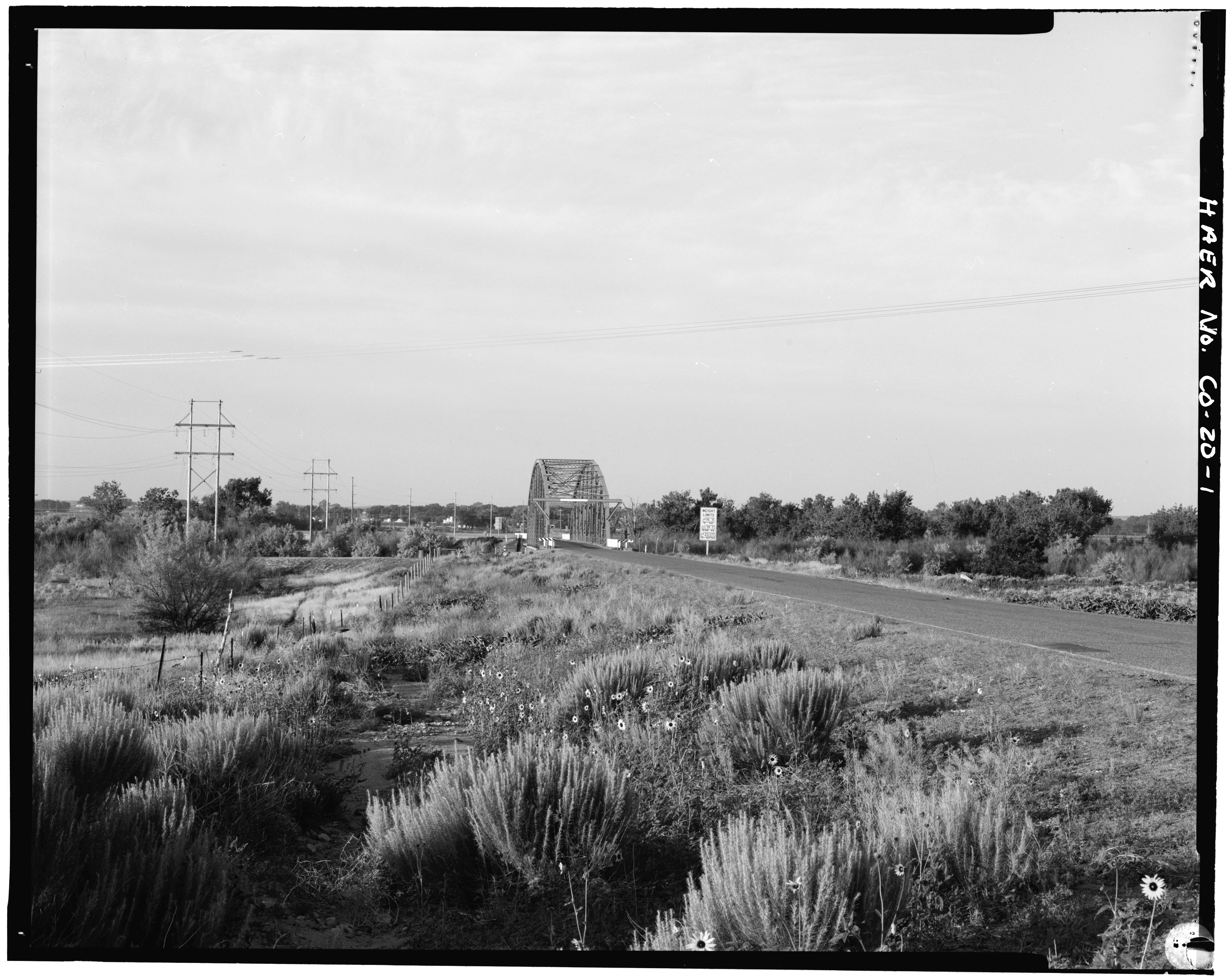
Overall view of Manzanola Bridge, State Highway 202 and Arkansas River, looking southwest

== See also ==
- List of bridges documented by the Historic American Engineering Record in Colorado
