= Colorado State Highway 207 =

State highway in Colorado, United States

State Highway 207
- SH 207 highlighted in red

Route information
- Maintained by CDOT
- Length: 5.935 mi (9.551 km)

Major junctions
- South end: US 50 in Manzanola
- North end: SH 96 in Crowley

Location
- Country: United States
- State: Colorado
- Counties: Crowley, Otero

Highway system
- Colorado State Highway System; Interstate; US; State; Scenic
← SH 202	→ SH 209

State Highway 207 (SH 207) is a state highway in the U.S. state of Colorado connecting Manzanola and Crowley. SH 207's southern terminus is at U.S. Route 50 (US 50) in Manzanola, and the eastern terminus is at SH 96 in Crowley.

== Route description ==
SH 207 runs 5.9 miles (9.5 km), starting at a junction with US 50 in Manzanola, heading north across the Arkansas River and ending at a junction with SH 96 in Crowley.

== Sgt. Mary Ricard Memorial Highway ==
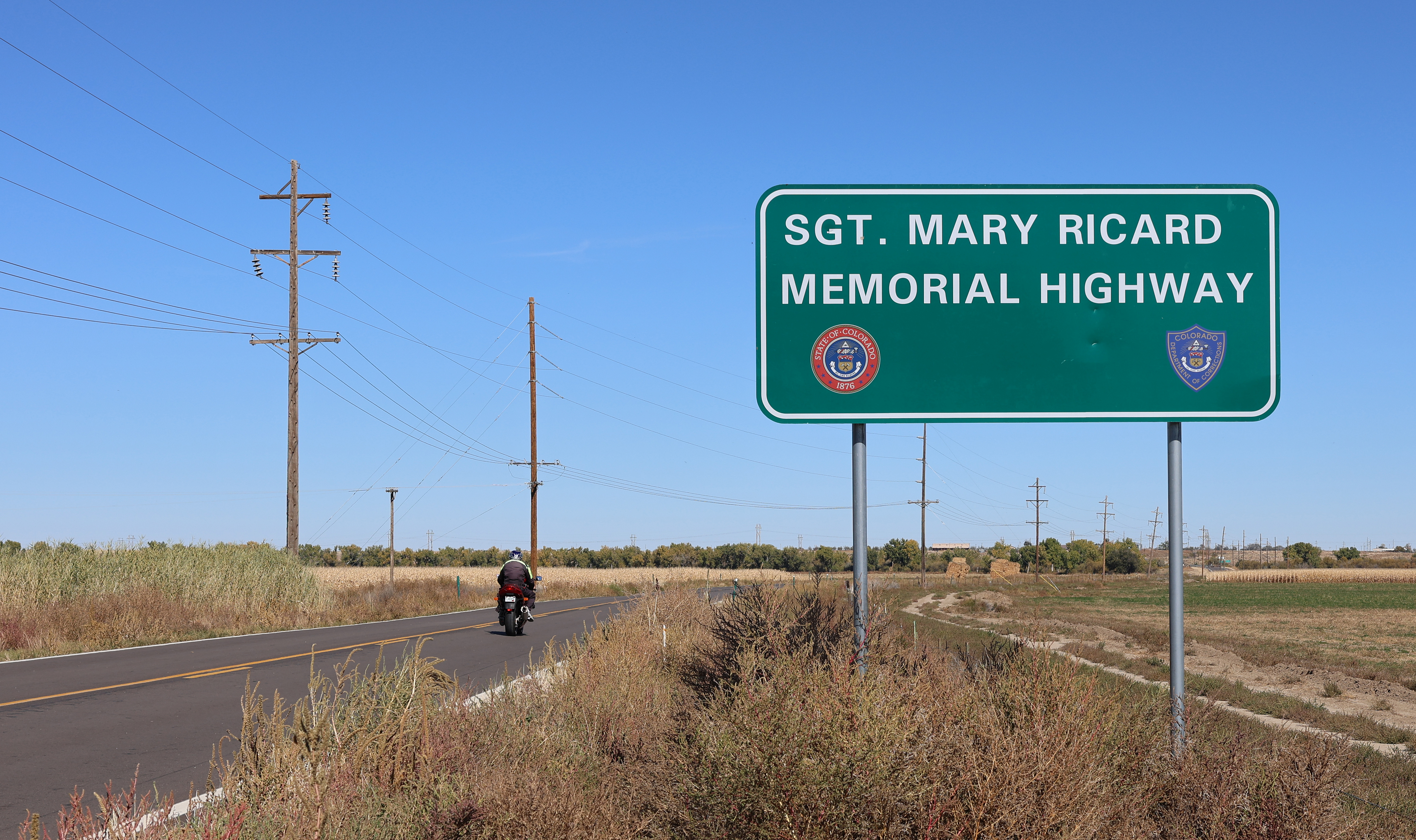
Sign north of Manzanola

In May 2018, the Colorado General Assembly designated the highway between Manzanola and Ordway as the "Sgt. Mary Ricard Memorial Highway." Ricard was a corrections officer who worked at the Arkansas Valley Correctional Facility in Crowley, near the highway's northern terminus. In September 2012, an inmate attacked her and one other corrections officer. Ricard later died from her wounds. Signs indicating the highway's new name were placed at each end of the highway in May 2019, followed by a dedication ceremony with a reception held at the prison where Ricard worked.

== Major intersections ==
County	Location	mi	km	Destinations	Notes
Otero	Manzanola	0.000	0.000	US 50	Southern terminus
Crowley	Crowley	5.935	9.551	SH 96 – Pueblo, Ordway	Northern terminus
1.000 mi = 1.609 km; 1.000 km = 0.621 mi
