= Ella Mae Gallavan =

American pathologist (1903–1996)

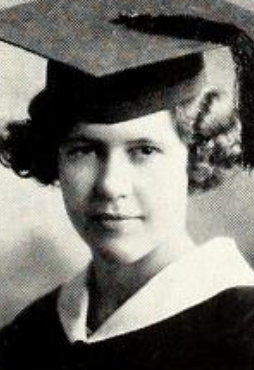
- Ella Mae Gallavan, from the 1923 yearbook of Colorado College
- Born: July 20, 1903; Ordway, Colorado, U.S.
- Died: August 1, 1966 (age 63)
- Other names: Mae Gallavan
- Occupations: Pathologist, physician

Ella Mae Gallavan (July 20, 1903 – August 1, 1966) was an American pathologist who was head of the pathology department at Colorado State Hospital, and did research on diseases including tuberculosis, whooping cough, meningitis, and schizophrenia.

== Early life and education ==
Gallavan was born in Ordway, Colorado, the daughter of Thomas Gallavan Jr. and Gertrude A. Gilligan Gallavan. Her parents died in 1923 and 1926. She graduated from Colorado College in 1924; while she was an undergraduate she was a competitive athlete. She was a member of Phi Beta Kappa. She earned her medical degree at Johns Hopkins Medical School in 1933. She became a research fellow in pathology at Vanderbilt University, and pursued further specialized training at Queens Square National Hospital in England.

== Career ==
Gallavan served an internship at Baltimore City Hospital, and was a medical resident at Cleveland City Hospital. She taught bacteriology at Vanderbilt University from 1936 to 1938. By 1940 she was a researcher at the Colorado State Hospital. In 1945, she became head of the pathology department there. She worked towards establishing board-certified residencies for pathologists at the hospital. In the 1950s she was director of the hospital's School of Medical Technology.

== Publications ==
Gallavan's work was published in scientific journals including Archives of Pathology, The American Journal of Pathology, Archives of Internal Medicine, American Journal of Psychiatry, and Diseases of the Nervous System.

- "Acquired Resistance to Tuberculosis with Investigations into the Validity of Ranke's Classification" (1936, with H. S. Reichle)
- "Infection of Chick Embryos with H. Pertussis Reproducing Pulmonary Lesions of Whooping Cough" (1937, with Ernest W. Goodpasture)
- "Encephalitis and Meningitis in the Chick Embryo Following Inoculation of the Chorio-Allantoic Membrane with H. Influenzae" (1937)
- "Simmonds' Disease (Anterior Hypophysial Insufficiency): Report of Two Cases with Autopsy" (1937, with Albert T. Steegmann)
- "Reactivation of a Primary Tuberculous Complex as a Source of Tuberculous Reinfection" (1937, with H. S. Reichle)
- "The Cephalin-Cholesterol Flocculation Test in Schizophrenia" (1948, with Frank H. Zimmerman and Merrill Thomas Eaton Jr.)
- "Brain tumors in mental patients; a statistical study" (1950, with Newell T. Braatelien)

== Personal life ==
Gallavan survived a serious highway accident in 1962. She died in 1966, at the age of 63.
