= La Junta station =

Train station in La Junta, Colorado, United States

La Junta, CO
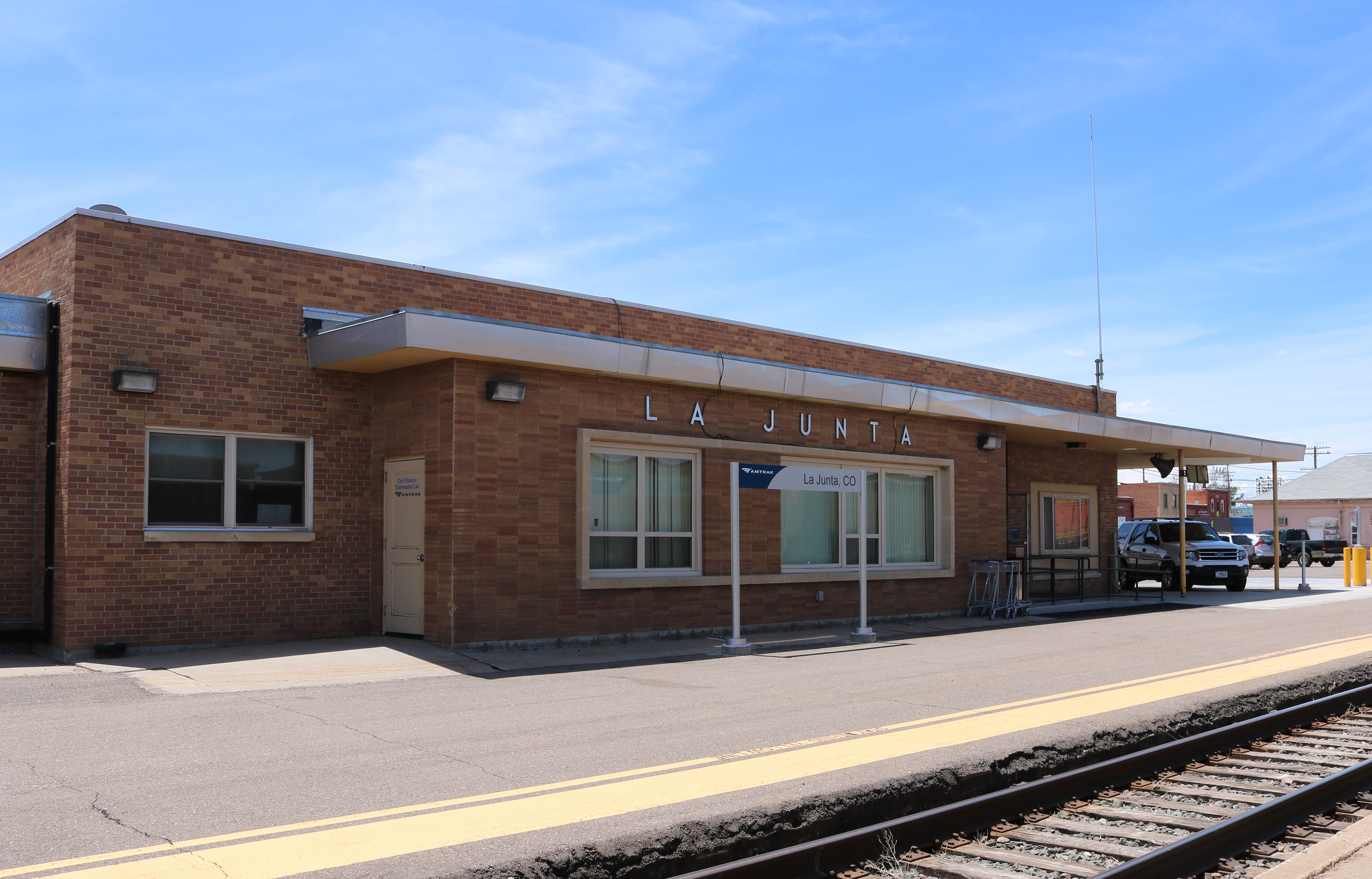
- The station viewed from trackside.

General information
- Location: 1 West First Street; La Junta, Colorado
- Coordinates: 37.9883°N 103.5443°W
- Line: BNSF Boise City / Raton Subdivisions
- Platforms: 1 side platform, 1 island platform
- Tracks: 2

Other information
- Station code: Amtrak: LAJ

History
- Rebuilt: 1955

Key dates
- July 25, 1894: Station depot burned

Passengers
- FY 2025: 6,247 (Amtrak)

Services
Preceding station	Amtrak	Following station
Trinidad toward Los Angeles	Southwest Chief	Lamar toward Chicago
Former services
Preceding station	Atchison, Topeka and Santa Fe Railway	Following station
Timpas toward Los Angeles	Main Line	Las Animas toward Chicago
Rocky Ford toward Denver	Denver Branch	Terminus
Location

La Junta station is a train station in La Junta, Colorado served by Amtrak. Amtrak's Southwest Chief trains 3 & 4 stop here for 10–15 minutes. Westbound trains are scheduled to arrive at 8:15 AM and depart at 8:30 AM, while the eastbound trains arrive at 7:30 PM and depart at 7:41 PM (all times Mountain Time Zone). There are no facilities at the station itself beyond a toilet and beverage vending machine. La Junta was a major point along the Atchison, Topeka and Santa Fe Railway, as a branch line to Pueblo and Denver started from here.

La Junta station was originally built in 1955 as a replacement for the former Harvey House. The freight house, which was part of the previous station was spared from being demolished and now serves as a Purina feed mill.

== See also ==
- List of Amtrak stations
