= Rocky Ford station =

Railway station in Rocky Ford, Colorado, U.S.

Rocky Ford
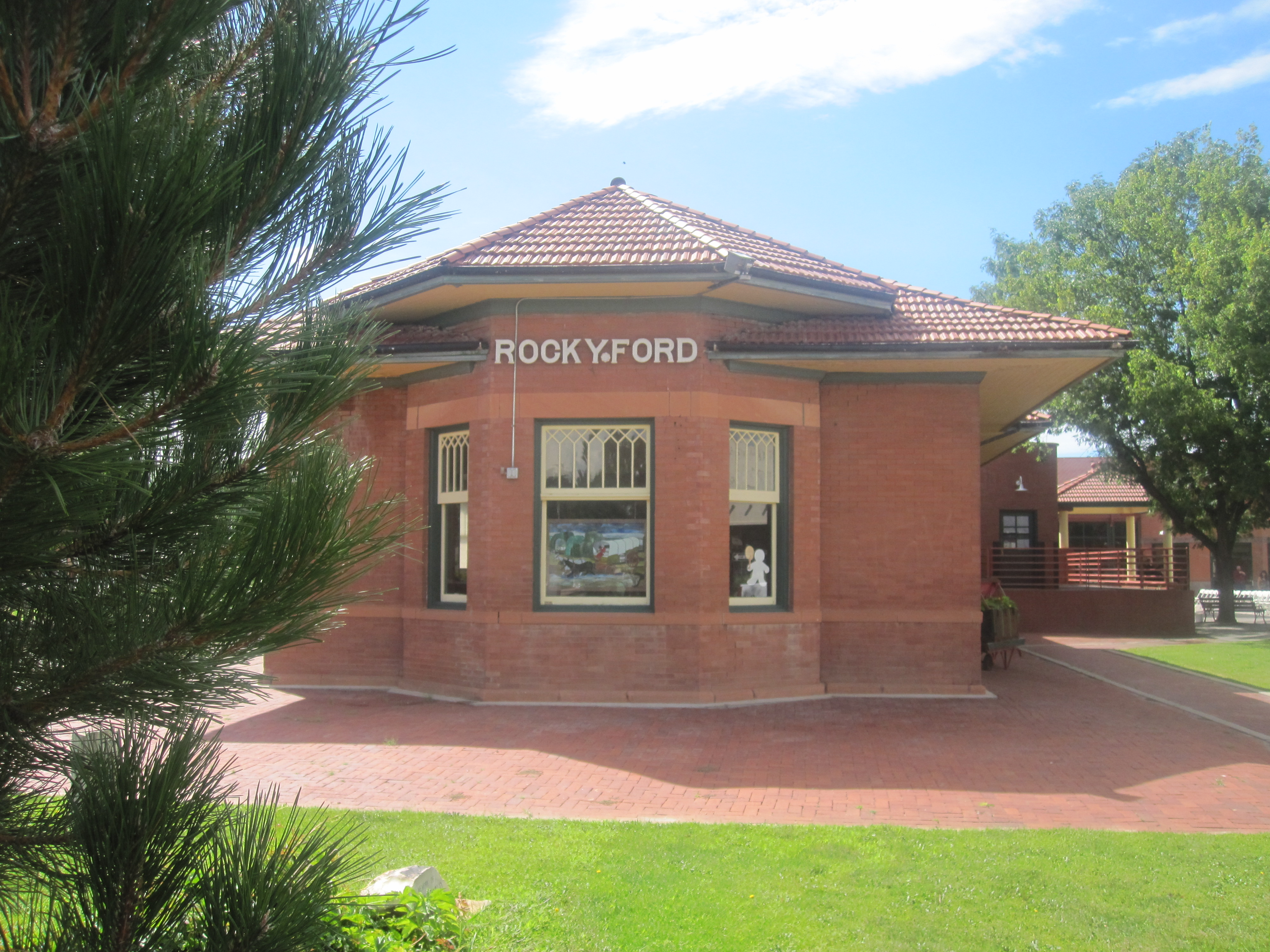
- The station's bay window

General information
- Location: North Main Street at Railroad right-of-way
- Coordinates: 38°03′11″N 103°43′13″W
- System: Former ATSF passenger rail station
- Owner: Rocky Ford Chamber of Commerce
- Line: track owned by BNSF Railway
- Platforms: 1 side platform
- Tracks: 1

Construction
- Structure type: at-grade

History
- Opened: 1876 (tracks built); 1903 (current depot built)
- Closed: 1979

Former services
Preceding station	Atchison, Topeka and Santa Fe Railway	Following station
Manzanola toward Denver	Denver Branch	La Junta Terminus
Location

Rocky Ford station was an Atchison, Topeka and Santa Fe Railway station in Rocky Ford, Colorado. The station is located two blocks south of U.S. Highway 50 and State Highway 71. The station has been restored and is now used by the Rocky Ford Chamber of Commerce. It was on the Denver Branch, connecting La Junta and Denver. The line is now owned by BNSF.
