= Manzanola, Colorado =

Town in Otero County, Colorado, United States

- Statutory town
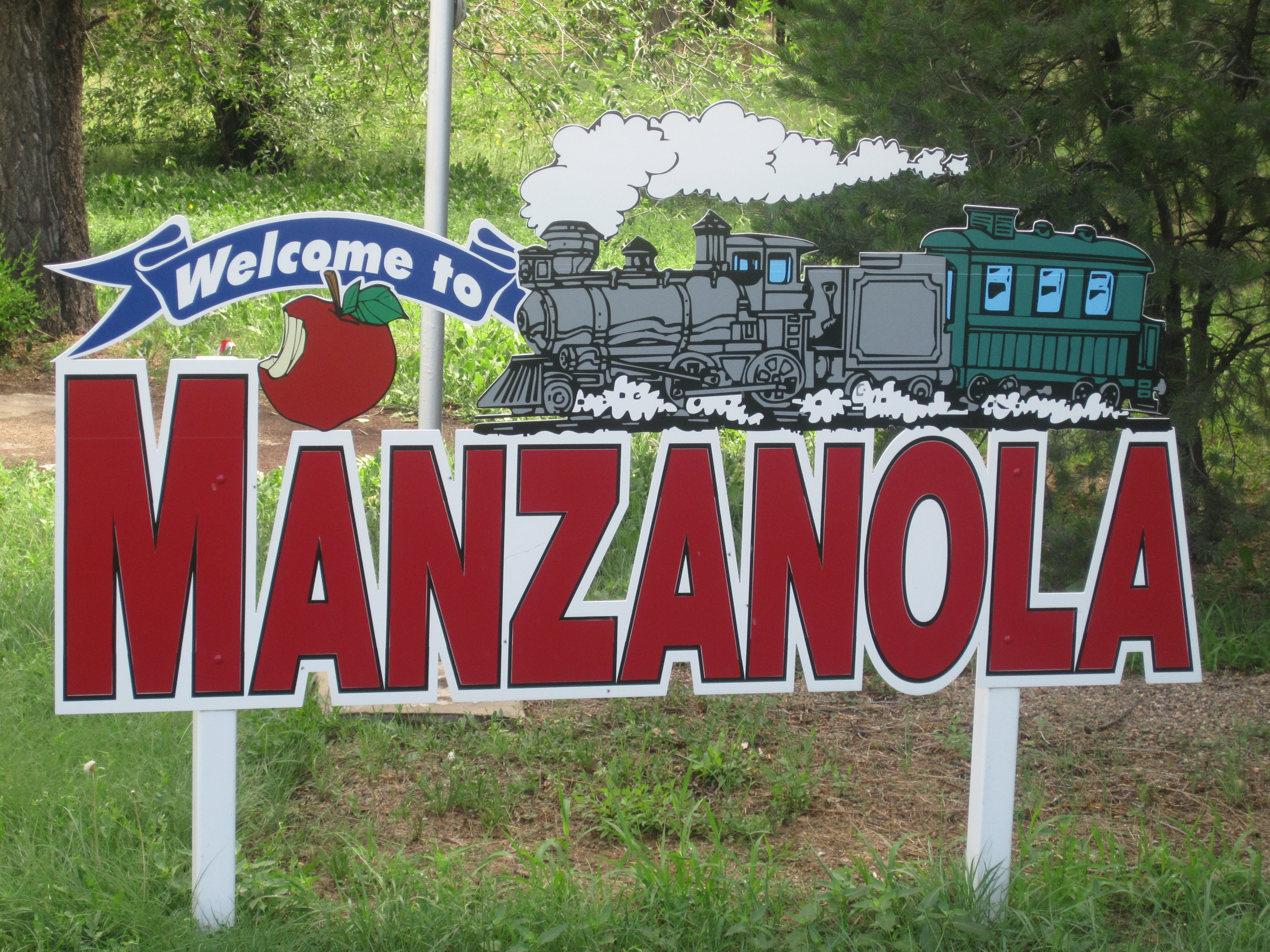
- Welcome Sign (2010)

- Location of Manzanola in Otero County, Colorado.
- Coordinates: 38°06′32″N 103°52′0.5″W
- Country: United States
- State: Colorado
- County: Otero
- Incorporated (town): July 9, 1900

Government
  - Type: Statutory town

Area
  - Total: 0.29 sq mi (0.74 km^{2})
  - Land: 0.29 sq mi (0.74 km^{2})
  - Water: 0 sq mi (0.00 km^{2})
- Elevation: 4,255 ft (1,297 m)

Population (2020)
  - Total: 341
  - Density: 1,200/sq mi (460/km^{2})
- Time zone: UTC-7 (Mountain (MST))
  - Summer (DST): UTC-6 (MDT)
- ZIP code: 81050
- Area code: 719
- FIPS code: 08-48500
- GNIS feature ID: 2412949
- Website: townofmanzanola.colorado.gov

Manzanola is a statutory town in Otero County, Colorado, United States. The town population was 341 at the 2020 United States census.

== History ==
A post office called Manzanola has been in operation since 1895. The town was named for an orchard near the original town site, Manzanola being a name derived from Spanish meaning "red apple".

Manzanola was previously known as Town of Grams Ranch, Town of Apishipa, and the Town of Catlin, in consecutive order.

== Geography ==
According to the United States Census Bureau, the town has a total area of 0.3 square miles (0.78 km^{2}), all of it land.

== Demographics ==
Historical population
Census	Pop.	Note	%±
1910	428		—
1920	562		31.3%
1930	578		2.8%
1940	531		−8.1%
1950	543		2.3%
1960	562		3.5%
1970	451		−19.8%
1980	459		1.8%
1990	437		−4.8%
2000	525		20.1%
2010	434		−17.3%
2020	341		−21.4%
U.S. Decennial Census

As of the census of 2000, there were 525 people, 189 households, and 120 families residing in the town. The population density was 2,018.2 inhabitants per square mile (779.2/km^{2}). There were 209 housing units at an average density of 803.4 per square mile (310.2/km^{2}). The racial makeup of the town was 74.48% White, 0.57% African American, 1.14% Native American, 0.57% Asian, 20.76% from other races, and 2.48% from two or more races. Hispanic or Latino of any race were 45.14% of the population.

There were 189 households, out of which 30.2% had children under the age of 18 living with them, 45.0% were married couples living together, 12.7% had a female householder with no husband present, and 36.5% were non-families. 31.2% of all households were made up of individuals, and 16.9% had someone living alone who was 65 years of age or older. The average household size was 2.74 and the average family size was 3.57.

In the town, the population was spread out, with 30.7% under the age of 18, 11.6% from 18 to 24, 24.0% from 25 to 44, 18.9% from 45 to 64, and 14.9% who were 65 years of age or older. The median age was 33 years. For every 100 females, there were 89.5 males. For every 100 females age 18 and over, there were 88.6 males.

The median income for a household in the town was $19,196, and the median income for a family was $26,250. Males had a median income of $24,688 versus $15,250 for females. The per capita income for the town was $9,598. About 23.2% of families and 30.3% of the population were below the poverty line, including 45.4% of those under age 18 and 15.8% of those age 65 or over.

== Infrastructure ==
=== Water ===
Due to the groundwater being contaminated with salt and naturally occurring radiation, the water system performs tests regularly. The Arkansas Valley Conduit would bring clean water to the community.

=== Transportation ===
Manzanola is part of Colorado's Bustang network. Is it along the Lamar-Pueblo-Colorado Springs Outrider line.

== See also ==
- Santa Fe Railway Manzanola Depot
- Manzanola Bridge
