= Ordway, Colorado =

Town in and county seat of Crowley County, Colorado, United States

- Town
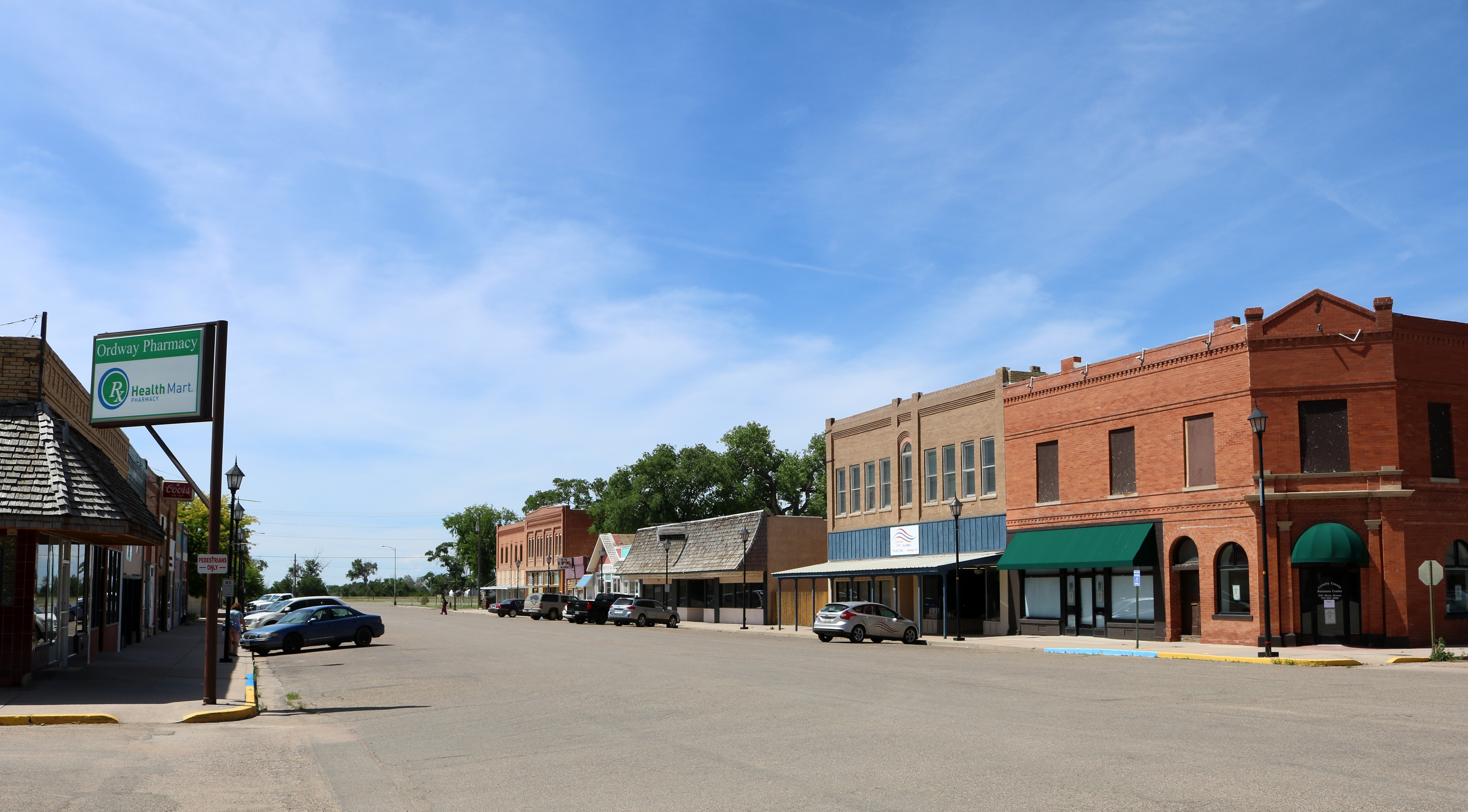
- Main Street in Ordway (2017)

- Location within Crowley County and Colorado
- Coordinates: 38°13′11″N 103°45′26″W
- Country: United States
- State: Colorado
- County: Crowley
- Incorporated: September 4, 1900

Area
  - Total: 0.77 sq mi (2.00 km^{2})
  - Land: 0.77 sq mi (2.00 km^{2})
  - Water: 0 sq mi (0.00 km^{2})
- Elevation: 4,311 ft (1,314 m)

Population (2020)
  - Total: 1,066
  - Density: 1,380/sq mi (533/km^{2})
- Time zone: UTC−7 (MST)
  - Summer (DST): UTC−6 (MDT)
- ZIP Code: 81063
- Area code: 719
- FIPS code: 08-56145
- GNIS ID: 2413090
- Website: Town of Ordway

Ordway is a statutory town in and the county seat of Crowley County, Colorado, United States. The population was 1,066 at the 2020 census, making it the most populous community in the county.

== History ==
A post office called Ordway has been in operation since 1890. The community was named after George N. Ordway, a Denver politician.

== Geography ==
Ordway is located in south-central Crowley County. State Highway 96 runs along the southern edge of the town, leading west 49 miles (79 km) to Pueblo and east 60 miles (97 km) to Eads. Highway 71 runs along the eastern edge of the town and leads south 11 miles (18 km) to U.S. Route 50 near Rocky Ford and north 75 miles (121 km) to Interstate 70 at Limon.

According to the United States Census Bureau, Ordway has a total area of 0.8 square miles (2.1 km^{2}), all of it land.

=== Climate ===
According to the Köppen Climate Classification system, Ordway has a cold semi-arid climate, abbreviated "BSk" on climate maps. The hottest temperature recorded in Ordway was 111 °F (43.9 °C) on July 14, 2003 and July 20, 2005, while the coldest temperature recorded was −29 °F (−33.9 °C) on February 15, 2021.

Climate data for Ordway, Colorado, 1991–2020 normals, extremes 1980–present
Month	Jan	Feb	Mar	Apr	May	Jun	Jul	Aug	Sep	Oct	Nov	Dec	Year
Record high °F (°C)	77 (25)	82 (28)	93 (34)	95 (35)	107 (42)	110 (43)	111 (44)	108 (42)	105 (41)	98 (37)	87 (31)	80 (27)	111 (44)
Mean maximum °F (°C)	68.5 (20.3)	71.0 (21.7)	80.7 (27.1)	87.4 (30.8)	95.7 (35.4)	103.5 (39.7)	105.4 (40.8)	102.7 (39.3)	98.9 (37.2)	90.0 (32.2)	77.3 (25.2)	67.7 (19.8)	106.5 (41.4)
Mean daily maximum °F (°C)	44.8 (7.1)	48.3 (9.1)	59.6 (15.3)	67.1 (19.5)	77.1 (25.1)	88.9 (31.6)	94.2 (34.6)	91.1 (32.8)	83.3 (28.5)	69.6 (20.9)	55.9 (13.3)	45.1 (7.3)	68.7 (20.4)
Daily mean °F (°C)	28.6 (−1.9)	32.4 (0.2)	42.4 (5.8)	50.3 (10.2)	61.0 (16.1)	72.0 (22.2)	77.5 (25.3)	75.1 (23.9)	66.0 (18.9)	52.0 (11.1)	38.8 (3.8)	29.1 (−1.6)	52.1 (11.2)
Mean daily minimum °F (°C)	12.3 (−10.9)	16.6 (−8.6)	25.2 (−3.8)	33.5 (0.8)	45.0 (7.2)	55.1 (12.8)	60.7 (15.9)	59.0 (15.0)	48.7 (9.3)	34.3 (1.3)	21.8 (−5.7)	13.0 (−10.6)	35.4 (1.9)
Mean minimum °F (°C)	−3.6 (−19.8)	−1.8 (−18.8)	9.7 (−12.4)	19.3 (−7.1)	30.4 (−0.9)	44.0 (6.7)	53.0 (11.7)	50.9 (10.5)	35.7 (2.1)	17.3 (−8.2)	5.1 (−14.9)	−4.5 (−20.3)	−10.3 (−23.5)
Record low °F (°C)	−24 (−31)	−29 (−34)	−3 (−19)	5 (−15)	20 (−7)	32 (0)	44 (7)	34 (1)	20 (−7)	−12 (−24)	−15 (−26)	−23 (−31)	−29 (−34)
Average precipitation inches (mm)	0.24 (6.1)	0.21 (5.3)	0.50 (13)	1.12 (28)	1.51 (38)	1.52 (39)	2.18 (55)	1.92 (49)	0.70 (18)	0.78 (20)	0.31 (7.9)	0.24 (6.1)	11.23 (285.4)
Average snowfall inches (cm)	2.4 (6.1)	3.0 (7.6)	2.7 (6.9)	0.8 (2.0)	0.0 (0.0)	0.0 (0.0)	0.0 (0.0)	0.0 (0.0)	0.1 (0.25)	0.7 (1.8)	1.1 (2.8)	3.3 (8.4)	14.1 (35.85)
Average precipitation days (≥ 0.01 in)	1.4	1.7	3.0	3.7	4.2	4.5	5.1	5.1	2.7	2.4	1.6	1.6	37.0
Average snowy days (≥ 0.1 in)	1.2	1.1	0.8	0.3	0.0	0.0	0.0	0.0	0.0	0.2	0.7	1.2	5.5
Source 1: NOAA
Source 2: National Weather Service

== Demographics ==
Historical population
Census	Pop.	Note	%±
1900	138		—
1910	705		410.9%
1920	1,186		68.2%
1930	1,139		−4.0%
1940	1,150		1.0%
1950	1,290		12.2%
1960	1,254		−2.8%
1970	1,017		−18.9%
1980	1,135		11.6%
1990	1,025		−9.7%
2000	1,248		21.8%
2010	1,080		−13.5%
2020	1,066		−1.3%
U.S. Decennial Census

=== 2020 census ===
As of the 2020 census, Ordway had a population of 1,066. The median age was 45.7 years. 20.1% of residents were under the age of 18 and 24.3% of residents were 65 years of age or older. For every 100 females there were 97.8 males, and for every 100 females age 18 and over there were 98.1 males age 18 and over.

0.0% of residents lived in urban areas, while 100.0% lived in rural areas.

There were 456 households in Ordway, of which 24.1% had children under the age of 18 living in them. Of all households, 34.4% were married-couple households, 28.1% were households with a male householder and no spouse or partner present, and 29.8% were households with a female householder and no spouse or partner present. About 38.6% of all households were made up of individuals and 18.4% had someone living alone who was 65 years of age or older.

There were 518 housing units, of which 12.0% were vacant. The homeowner vacancy rate was 3.9% and the rental vacancy rate was 9.2%.

Racial composition as of the 2020 census
Race	Number	Percent
White	821	77.0%
Black or African American	7	0.7%
American Indian and Alaska Native	21	2.0%
Asian	9	0.8%
Native Hawaiian and Other Pacific Islander	0	0.0%
Some other race	66	6.2%
Two or more races	142	13.3%
Hispanic or Latino (of any race)	326	30.6%

== Notable people ==
- Ella Mae Gallavan (1903–1966), pathologist

== See also ==
- List of municipalities in Colorado
